= List of properties with 999-year leases in Hong Kong =

== List of properties ==
The below tables are not exhaustive.

=== Sub-999-year leases ===
The following table lists properties in all districts that have sub-999-year leases.

Table of Properties with sub-999-year leases
District	Building	Lease Expiration	Primary Lots	Notes	Ref
Central and Western	28 Aberdeen St; 28 Aberdeen Street	2843	I.L. 98	981 years from 25 December 1862	
Central and Western	King Ho Building; 41-49 Aberdeen Street	2854	I.L. 94	994 Years Commencing From 26 October 1860	
Central and Western	Caine Tower; 55 Aberdeen Street	2854	I.L. 94	994 Years Commencing From 26 October 1860	
Central and Western	Hoi Ming Court; 4 Babington Path	2859	I.L. 609B	997 Years Commencing From 25 June 1862	
Central and Western	Cheery Garden; 6A Babington Path	2859	I.L. 609C	997 Years Commencing From 25 June 1862	
Central and Western	Bonham Court; 12 Bonham Road	2858	I.L. 605	995 Years Commencing From 25 June 1863	
Central and Western	Bonham Terrace; 24-26 Bonham Road	2858	I.L. 605	995 Years Commencing From 25 June 1863	
Central and Western	Ning Yeung Terrace; 78 Bonham Road	2859	I.L. 3398 I.L. 609A I.L. 609D	997 Years Commencing From 25 June 1862	
Central and Western	Rhine Court; 80-82 Bonham Road	2859	I.L. 609D	997 Years Commencing From 25 June 1862	
Central and Western	On Wing Building 51-59 Bonham Strand 79-83 Wing Lok Street	2841	M.L. 166 M.L. 167 M.L. 168 M.L. 169 M.L. 170	981 Years Commencing From 26 December 1860	
Central and Western	Ying Piu Mansion; 1 Breezy Path	2858	I.L. 605	995 Years Commencing From 25 June 1863	
Central and Western	New Henry House 8A-8C Des Voeux Road Central 10-10G Ice House Street	2842	M.L. 2A	981 years from 25 June 1861	
Central and Western	Graceful Court; 27-37 Hill Road	2850	I.L. 834	986 Years Commencing From 26 December 1864	
Central and Western	Fu Yin Court; 39 Hill Road	2850	I.L. 834	986 Years Commencing From 26 December 1864	
Central and Western	No. 2 Park Road; 2 Park Road	2858	I.L. 605	995 years commencing from 25 June 1863	
Central and Western	Novum West; 460 Queen's Road West	2850	I.L. 834	986 Years commencing from 26 December 1864	
Central and Western	Ihong Mansion; 7 St. Stephen's Lane	2859	I.L. 609B	997 Years Commencing From 25 June 1862	
Central and Western	Centre Point; 72 Staunton Street	2854	I.L. 94 I.L. 3011 I.L. 3012 I.L. 3013 I.L. 3014	994 Years commencing From 26 October 1860	
Central and Western	Dawning Height; 80 Staunton Street	2854	I.L. 2990 I.L. 2991 I.L. 2992 I.L. 3094 I.L. 2993 I.L. 7753 I.L. 2989 I.L. 7183 I.L. 2987 I.L. 2986 I.L. 2985 I.L. 2997 I.L. 2996	IL 2989 R.P.: 994 Years Commencing From 26 October 1860 IL 7183: 75 Years + 75 Years Renewal Commencing From 19 July 1954 IL 7753: 75 Years + 75 Years Renewal Commencing From 1 May 1961	
Central and Western	235 Wing Lok Street Trade Centre; 235 Wing Lok Street	2842	M.L. 37A	Marine Lot No. 37A: 979 years commencing from 26 December 1863	
Central and Western	Kin Wang House; 21 Wing Wo Street	2842	M.L. 63A	981 years commencing from 26 June 1861	
Wan Chai	Po Ngai Garden; 30 Amoy Street	2842	I.L. 4348 I.L. 4349 I.L. 4350	979 Years Commencing From 25 June 1863	
Wan Chai	Po Wing Building 61-73 Lee Garden Road 108-120 Percival Street	2842	I.L. 29	982 years from 25 June 1860	
Wan Chai	Lippo Leighton Tower; 103 Leighton Road	2842	I.L. 29	982 years from 25 June 1860	
Wan Chai	Hennessy Apartments; 48-52 Percival Street	2842	M.L. 365	982 years from 25 June 1860	
Wan Chai	54-60 Percival Street; 5-11 Lee Garden Road	2842	M.L. 365; I.L. 29	Two leases each for a term of 982 years from 25 June 1860	
Wan Chai	Shun Feng International Centre; 182 Queen's Road East	2842	I.L. 7693 I.L. 4359 I.L. 4360 I.L. 4361	Conditions of Exchange No. 6407: 75 years and renewable for 75 years commencing from 16 June 1960, And under Government Leases for terms of 979 years commencing from 25 June 1863	
Wan Chai	QRE Plaza; 202 Queen's Road East	2841	I.L. 7781	978 years commencing on 25 June 1863	
Wan Chai	China Taiping Tower Phase 1 and 2; 8 Sunning Road	2842	I.L. 29	IL 29: 982 years from 25 June 1860	

=== Central and Western District ===
The following table lists properties in the Central and Western District that have 999-year leases.

Table of Properties with 999-year leases in Central and Western District
Street	Building	Lease Expiration	Primary Lots	Notes	Ref
Arbuthnot Road	Shiu King Court; 4-8 Arbuthnot Road	2843	I.L. 4084 I.L. 4085 I.L. 4086	999 Years Commencing From 22 January 1844	
Babington Path	Shing Kai Mansion; 13-15 Babington Path	2861	I.L. 1216	999 Years Commencing From 25 June 1862	
Babington Path	Kingsford Height; 17 Babington Path	2861	I.L. 1216	999 Years Commencing From 25 June 1862	
Babington Path	Shiu Chung Court; 21 Babington Path	2861	I.L. 1216	999 Years Commencing From 25 June 1862	
Babington Path	Babington Hill; 23 Babington Path	2861	I.L. 1216	The lease term granted under the Government Lease of Inland Lot No. 1216 dated 14 December 1889 is 999 years from 25 June 1862	
Babington Path	Rowen Court; 25 Babington Path	2861	I.L. 1216	999 Years Commencing From 25 June 1862	
Burd Street	Kam Fai House; 11-13 Burd Street	2841	M.L. 175	999 Years Commencing From 1842	
Belcher's Street	Pearl Court; 13 Belcher's Street	2880	M.L. 268	999 Years Commencing From 11 October 1881	
Belcher's Street	Kennedy 38; 38 Belcher's Street	2891	I.L. 953	999 years commencing from 24 June 1892	
Belcher's Street	Houston Court; 40 Belcher's Street	2891	I.L. 953	999 Years Commencing From 24 June 1892	
Belcher's Street	Lexington Hill; 44A-46 Belcher's Street	2891	I.L. 953	Inland Lot No 953: 999 years commencing from 24 June 1892	
Belcher's Street	Lungga Mansion; 46A Belcher's Street	2891	I.L. 953	999 Years Commencing From 24 June 1892	
Belcher's Street	Imperial Kennedy; 68-84 Belcher's Street	2891	I.L. 954; I.L. 5924	999 Years commencing from 24 June 1892	
Belcher's Street	100 Belcher's Street	2882	I.L. 906	Inland Lot No 906: 999 years commencing from 24 June 1883	
Belcher's Street	Luen Yau Apartments; 102-114 Belcher's Street	2882	I.L. 906	Inland Lot No 906: 999 years commencing from 24 June 1883	
Belcher's Street	Luen Hong Apartments; 116-122A Belcher's Street	2882	I.L. 906	Inland Lot No 906: 999 years commencing from 24 June 1883	
Belcher's Street	Luen Gay Apartments; 124-134A Belcher's Street	2882	I.L. 906	Inland Lot No 906: 999 years commencing from 24 June 1883	
Belcher's Street	Luen Wai Apartments; 136-142 Belcher's Street	2882	I.L. 906	Inland Lot No 906: 999 years commencing from 24 June 1883	
Belcher's Street	Kam Tong Building; 139-153 Belcher's Street	2891	I.L. 1297	999 Years Commencing From 24 June 1892	
Belcher's Street	Kam Ho Court; 144-148 Belcher's Street	2882	I.L. 905	999 Years commencing from 24 September 1883	
Belcher's Street	Westview Height; 163 Belcher's Street	2891	I.L. 1297	999 Years Commencing From 24 June 1892	
Belcher's Street	Kennedy Mansion; 165-175 Belcher's Street	2891	I.L. 1298	999 Years Commencing From 24 June 1892	
Belcher's Street	Sai Wan New Apartments; 179 Belcher's Street	2891	I.L. 1298	999 Years Commencing From 24 June 1892	
Bonham Road	Bonham Ville; 5 Bonham Road	2888	I.L. 1217	999 Years Commencing From 27 May 1889	
Bonham Road	Golden Lodge; 9 Bonham Road	2888	I.L. 1217; I.L. 7542	IL 1217: 999 Years Commencing From 27 May 1889; IL 7542: 75 Years + 75 Years Renewal Commencing From 9 December 1957	
Bonham Road	Kam Ning Mansion; 13-15 Bonham Road	2860	I.L. 689	999 Years Commencing From 25 June 1861	
Bonham Road	Ka Fu Building; 19-27 Bonham Road	2860	I.L. 6512 I.L. 6511 I.L. 6510 I.L. 6509 I.L. 6508	999 Years Commencing From 25 June 1861	]
Bonham Road	the MVP; 28 Bonham Road	2858	I.L. 605	995 Years Commencing From 25 June 1863	
Bonham Road	Wing Cheung Court; 37-47 Bonham Road	2860	I.L. 692; I.L. 693	999 Years Commencing From 25 June 1861	
Bonham Road	Good View Court; 51-53 Bonham Road	2860	I.L. 693	999 Years Commencing From 25 June 1861	
Bonham Road	Bonham Crest; 52 Bonham Road	2861	I.L. 2037	999 Years Commencing From 7 January 1862	
Bonham Road	Kam Fung Mansion; 59-61 Bonham Road	2860	I.L. 694	999 Years Commencing From 25 June 1861	
Bonham Road	Yee Ga Court; 62 Bonham Road	2861	I.L. 2032; I.L. 2031	999 Years Commencing From 7 January 1862	
Bonham Road	The Bonham Mansion; 63 Bonham Road	2860	I.L. 694	IL 694: 999 years commencing from 25 June 1861	
Bonham Road	Skylight Tower; 64 Bonham Road	2861	I.L. 2030; I.L. 2029	999 Years Commencing From 7 January 1862	
Bonham Road	Smiling Court; 65 Bonham Road	2861	I.L. 757	999 Years Commencing From 7 January 1862	
Bonham Road	Park Height 66 Bonham Road 12A Park Road	2861	I.L. 760	999 Years Commencing From 7 January 1862	
Bonham Road	Kingsland Court; 66B Bonham Road	2861	I.L. 760	999 Years Commencing From 7 January 1862	
Bonham Road	University of Hong Kong Main Campus 90 Bonham Road 70-74 Pok Fu Lam Road		I.L. 8482	The freehold was surrendered in the 1920s in exchange for the grant of further land and re-grant of the original estate, both for 999 years	
Bonham Strand	The Pemberton; 22-26 Bonham Strand	2842	I.L. 7667	IL 7667 is held under Conditions of Exchange No. 6383 for a term of 999 years commencing from 26 June 1843	
Bonham Strand	Bonham Trade Centre; 50 Bonham Strand	2859	M.L. 142 M.L. 144 I.L. 15	Inland Lot No. 15: 999 years commencing from 26 December 1860; Marine Lot Nos. 142 and 144: 981 years commencing from 26 December 1860	
Bonham Strand	Hing Lung Commercial Building; 68-74 Bonham Strand	2842	I.L. 1410 I.L. 855 I.L. 856 I.L. 857	999 years commencing on 26 June 1843	
Bonham Strand	Shun Loong Building; 84-90 Bonham Strand	2842/2851	M.L. 34; I.L. 863	ML 34: 999 Years Commencing From 26 June 1843; IL 863: 999 Years Commencing From 1 January 1852	
Bonham Strand	135 Bonham Strand Trade Centre; 135 Bonham Strand	2859	I.L. 6896; M.L. 173	Marine Lot No. 173: 999 years commencing from 26 December 1860; Inland Lot No. 6896: 75 years commencing from 14 November 1952 renewable for a further term of 75 years.	
Bonham Strand	iclub Sheung Wan Hotel; 138 Bonham Strand	2851/2867	M.L. 67A M.L. 67 I.L. 66	Marine Lot No. 67 and Marine Lot No. 67A: 999 years commencing from 7 February 1852; Inland Lot No. 66: 999 years commencing from 26 March 1868	
Bonham Strand West	iclub Shueng Wan II Hotel 5 Bonham Strand West 169-171 Wing Lok Street	2841	I.L. 1072	IL 1072 RP, IL 1072 sAss1 RP and IL 1072 sA RP: 999 years from 26 September 1842	
Bonham Strand West	Man King Building; 9-11 Bonham Strand West	2853	I.L. 1073	999 years commencing from 27 September 1854	
Bonham Strand West	Ka Fung Building; 23-25 Bonham Strand West	2853	I.L. 870	999 years commencing from 27 September 1854	
Bonham Strand West	Wing Tuck Commercial Centre 13-17 Bonham Strand West 177-183 Wing Lok Street	2853	I.L. 1073 I.L. 1728 I.L. 1761 I.L. 1760	999 years commencing from 27 September 1854	
Cadogan Street	Cadogan 37A-37B Cadogan Street 150 Belcher's Street	2882	I.L. 905	999 Years commencing from 24 September 1883	
Cadogan Street	Cado Building; 39-41 Cadogan Street	2882	I.L. 905	999 Years commencing from 24 September 1883	
Cadogan Street	Han Yu Building; 45-55 Cadogan Street	2882	I.L. 905	999 Years commencing from 24 September 1883	
Caine Road	Botanical Court 5 Caine Road 19-21 Arbuthnot Road	2854	I.L. 141	999 Years Commencing From 1 February 1855	
Caine Road	Caine Building; 22 Caine Road	2842	I.L. 1487	999 Years Commencing From 26 June 1843	
Caine Road	Gramercy; 38 Caine Road	2854	I.L. 150	999 Years commencing From 1 February 1855	
Caine Road	Tim Po Court; 43-45 Caine Road	2854	I.L. 4424; I.L. 4423	999 Years Commencing From 1 February 1855	
Caine Road	Scenic Rise; 46 Caine Road	2854	I.L. 150	999 Years Commencing From 1 February 1855	
Caine Road	Cheong Ngar Court; 57 Caine Road	2854	I.L. 126	999 Years Commencing From 1 February 1855	
Caine Road	Midland Court; 58-62 Caine Road	2843/2848	I.L. 151; I.L. 152A	IL 151: 999 Years Commencing From 22 January 1844; IL 152A: 999 Years Commencing From 25 June 1849	
Caine Road	Cameo Court; 63-69 Caine Road	2848	I.L. 123	999 Years Commencing From 27 November 1849	
Caine Road	Golden Pavilion; 66 Caine Road	2896	I.L. 1405	999 Years Commencing From 30 March 1897	
Caine Road	Caine Hill; 73 Caine Road	2843/2848	I.L. 120; I.L. 122	IL 120: 999 Years Commencing From 25 June 1849; IL 122: 75 Years Commencing From 22 January 1844, extended for a further term of 924 years	
Caine Road	Honor Villa; 75 Caine Road	2843/2848	I.L. 120; I.L. 122	IL 120 S.B R.P.: 999 Years Commencing From 25 June 1849; IL 122 S.B R.P.: 75 Years Commencing From 22 January 1844, extended for a further term of 924 years	
Caine Road	Corona Tower; 93 Caine Road	2843/2853	I.L. 1086; I.L. 100	IL 1086: 999 Years Commencing From 22 January 1844; IL 100: 999 Years Commencing From 27 September 1854	
Caine Road	Alassio; 100 Caine Road	2854	I.L. 425	999 Years commencing From 28 May 1855	
Caine Road	On Fung Building; 110-118 Caine Road	2854	I.L. 424	Inland Lot No. 424: 999 years commencing from 28 May 1855	
Caine Road	Sussex Court; 120 Caine Road	2854	I.L. 424	999 Years Commencing From 28 May 1855	
Caine Road	Chatswood Villa; 126 Caine Road	2854	I.L. 424	999 Years Commencing From 28 May 1855	
Caine Road	Jadestone Court 138 Caine Road 49 Seymour Road	2856	I.L. 522	999 Years Commencing From 1 September 1857	
Castle Road	Castle One by V; 1 Castle Road	2854	I.L. 503	999 Years Commencing From 28 May 1855	
Castle Road	Windsor Court; 6 Castle Road	2854	I.L. 425	999 Years Commencing From 28 May 1855	
Castle Road	The Legacy; 8 Castle Road	2857	I.L. 576	999 Years Commencing From 8 March 1858	
Catchick Street	Kut Cheung Mansion; 1-3 Catchick Street	2891	M.L. 242	999 Years Commencing From 24 June 1892	
Catchick Street	S-Residence; 5-7 Catchick Street	2891	M.L. 242	999 Years Commencing From 24 June 1892	
Catchick Street	Kelly Court; 9-15 Catchick Street	2891	M.L. 242	999 Years Commencing From 24 June 1892	
Catchick Street	Cheong Fai Building; 17-21 Catchick Street	2891	M.L. 242	999 Years Commencing From 24 June 1892	
Catchick Street	Kam Hing Building; 27-31 Catchick Street	2891	M.L. 243	999 Years Commencing From 24 June 1892	
Catchick Street	The Highline; 33-47 Catchick Street	2891	M.L. 243	999 Years Commencing From 24 June 1892	
Catchick Street	Kam Fai House; 38-40 Catchick Street	2891	I.L. 1297	999 Years Commencing From 24 June 1892	
Catchick Street	42 Catchick Street	2891	I.L. 1297	999 Years Commencing From 24 June 1892	
Catchick Street	44 Catchick Street	2891	I.L. 1297	999 Years Commencing From 24 June 1892	
Catchick Street	Kuk Fung Building; 46-60A Catchick Street	2891	I.L. 5987 I.L. 1297	999 Years Commencing From 24 June 1892	
Catchick Street	Chi Fung Building; 63-64 Catchick Street	2891	I.L. 5985 I.L. 5986	999 years from 24 June 1892	
Catchick Street	Ka On Building; 65 Catchick Street	2891	M.L. 245	999 years from 24 June 1892	
Catchick Street	Kam Fu Mansion; 66-68 Catchick Street	2891	I.L. 5983 I.L. 5984	999 years from 24 June 1892	
Catchick Street	Shing Tai Building; 70-76 Catchick Street	2891	I.L. 5979 I.L. 5980 I.L. 5981 I.L. 5982	999 years from 24 June 1892	
Catchick Street	Yue On Building; 70-76 Catchick Street	2891	I.L. 5974 I.L. 5975 I.L. 5976 I.L. 5977 I.L. 5978	999 years from 24 June 1892	
Catchick Street	93-95 Catchick Street	2891	M.L. 245	999 years from 24 June 1892	
Catchick Street	Cheong Kat Mansion; 98-100 Catchick Street	2891	I.L. 1298	999 years from 24 June 1892	
Catchick Street	Timely Court; 99 Catchick Street	2891	M.L. 245	999 years from 24 June 1892	
Centre Street	Po Fung Building; 1-7 Centre Street	2854	I.L. 1278	999 Years Commencing From 1 October 1855	
Centre Street	General Building; 6-14 Centre Street	2891	I.L. 5101 I.L. 5202 I.L. 5103 I.L. 5104 I.L. 5105	999 Years Commencing From 27 July 1892	
Centre Street	Fook Moon Building; 52-56 Centre Street	2860	I.L. 683 I.L. 4048 I.L. 4049 I.L. 4050	999 Years Commencing From 25 June 1861	
Chancery Lane	Hong Kong 26 Court; 5B Chancery Lane	2852	I.L. 68	999 Years Commencing From 24 June 1853	
Chancery Lane	Cambridge Villa; 8-10 Chancery Lane	2854	I.L. 4421 I.L. 4420 I.L. 4419	999 Years Commencing From 1 February 1855	
Chancery Lane	11 Chancery Lane; 20-26 Old Bailey Street	2854	I.L. 4417; I.L. 4418	Demolished in 2018; building with 100 flats under construction; I.L. 4418: 999 years commencing from 1 February 1855	
Chater Road	Statue Square Chater Road Des Voeux Road Central	2894	I.L. 1841; I.L. 7414	I.L. 1841: 999 years from 20 November 1895; I.L. 7414: 999 years from 20 November 1895	
Chater Road	Hong Kong Club Building 3A Chater Road 3 Jackson Road	2894	M.L. 274	999 years commencing 20 February 1895	
Chico Terrace	3 Chico Terrace	2858	I.L. 584	999 Years Commencing From 25 June 1859	
Ching Lin Terrace	Ching Lin Court; 6 Ching Lin Terrace	2872	I.L. 2695 I.L. 2696 I.L. 2697	999 Years Commencing From 31 March 1873	
Chung Ching Street	Two Artlane; 1 Chung Ching Street	2854	I.L. 3872 I.L. 3873 I.L. 3874 I.L. 3875 I.L. 3876 I.L. 3877 I.L. 3878 I.L. 3879 I.L. 3880 I.L. 3881	999 years commencing from 1 October 1855	
Chung Ching Street	One Artlane; 8 Chung Ching Street	2854	I.L. 3863 I.L. 3864 I.L. 3865 I.L. 3866 I.L. 3867 I.L. 3868 I.L. 3869 I.L. 3870 I.L. 3871	999 Years commencing from 1 October 1855	
Clarence Terrace	High West; 36 Clarence Terrace	2861	I.L. 4892 I.L. 4907 I.L. 4908 I.L. 4909 I.L. 4910 I.L. 4911	999 Years commencing from 30 June 1862	
Cochrane Street	18 Cochrane Street	2843	I.L. 127	999 years commencing from 22 January 1844	
Conduit Road	Yukon Court; 2 Conduit Road	2860	I.L. 3457	999 Years Commencing From 25 June 1861	
Conduit Road	Tycoon Court; 8 Conduit Road	2860	I.L. 3458; I.L. 713	999 Years Commencing From 25 June 1861	
Conduit Road	Mountain View Court; 12 Conduit Road	2860	I.L. 712		
Conduit Road	Emerald Court; 14 Conduit Road	2860	I.L. 712		
Conduit Road	Conduit Tower; 20 Conduit Road	2871/2887	I.L. 1205; I.L. 723	IL 723: 999 Years Commencing From 5 April 1872; IL 1205: 999 Years Commencing From 8 October 1888	
Conduit Road	Vantage Park; 22 Conduit Road	2860	I.L. 2137; I.L. 706		
Conduit Road	Cimbria Court; 24 Conduit Road	2860	I.L. 2137	999 Years Commencing From 25 June 1861	
Conduit Road	Flourish Court; 30 Conduit Road	2860	I.L. 706	999 Years Commencing From 25 June 1861	
Conduit Road	Elegant Terrace; 36 Conduit Road	2860	I.L. 1252	999 Years Commencing From 25 June 1861	
Conduit Road	The Icon; 38 Conduit Road	2860	I.L. 1253	999 years commencing from 25 June 1861	
Conduit Road	Winsome Park; 42 Conduit Road	2860	I.L. 705	999 Years Commencing From 25 June 1861	
Conduit Road	Valiant Park; 52 Conduit Road	2860	I.L. 704		
Conduit Road	Yee Lin Mansion; 54A-54D Conduit Road	2860	I.L. 1661	999 Years Commencing From 25 June 1861	
Conduit Road	Blessings Garden; 56 Conduit Road	2860	I.L. 703	999 Years Commencing From 25 June 1861	
Conduit Road	Primrose Court; 56A Conduit Road	2879	I.L. 719	999 Years Commencing From 22 November 1880	
Conduit Road	Scenic Heights 58A-58B Conduit Rd 97 Robinson Rd	2879	I.L. 719	999 Years Commencing From 22 November 1880	
Conduit Road	Imperial Court; 62G Conduit Road	2885	I.L. 7956; I.L. 946	I.L. 946: 999 Years Commencing From 21 June 1886; I.L. 7956: Conditions of Exchange No. 8717, 75 years commencing from 10 August 1964 with the right of renewal for another 75 years	
Connaught Road Central	AIA Central; 1 Connaught Road Central	2894/2895	M.L. 275; M.L. 278	Marine Lot 275: 999 years commencing from 9 September 1895 Marine Lot 278: 999 years commencing from 12 October 1896	
Connaught Road Central	Mandarin Oriental Hotel; 5 Connaught Road Central	2895	M.L. 369	999 years from 6 December 1896	
Connaught Road Central	Chater House; 8 Connaught Road Central	2900	M.L. 287; M.L. 288	ML 287: 999 years commencing on 24 December 1901; ML 288: 999 years commencing on 18 July 1899	
Connaught Road Central	Euro Trade Centre 13-14 Connaught Road Central 21-23 Des Voeux Road Central	2899	M.L. 366	ML 366: 999 years commencing from 30 January 1900	
Connaught Road Central	Grand Building; 15-18 Connaught Road Central	2897/2898	M.L. 367; M.L. 368	Two leases for 999 years respectively from 6 December 1899 and 24 December 1898	
Connaught Road Central	Chuang's Tower; 30-32 Connaught Road Central	2899	M.L. 410 M.L. 375 M.L. 376	ML 375, 376 and 410: 999 years commencing from 16 October 1900	
Connaught Road Central	AIE Building; 33 Connaught Road Central	2899	M.L. 377	999 years commencing from 16 October 1900	
Connaught Road Central	NEXXUS Building; 41 Connaught Road Central	2903	M.L. 382	999 years commencing from 25 October 1904	
Connaught Road Central	Agriculture Bank of China Tower; 49-51 Connaught Road Central	2902	M.L. 384 M.L. 385 M.L. 386 M.L. 387 M.L. 388 M.L. 389 M.L. 390	Former site of Crocodile House 1 and 2 ML 384: 999 years from 7 December 1903 ML 385: 999 years from 20 November 1903 ML 386: 999 years from 20 November 1903 ML 387: 999 years from 20 November 1903 ML 388: 999 years from 6 November 1903 ML 389 RP: 999 years from 6 November 1903	
Connaught Road Central	Nan Fung Tower; 88 Connaught Road Central	2902	I.L. 2634 I.L. 2635 M.L. 452 M.L. 453 M.L. 454	999 years from 1903	
Connaught Road Central	Alliance Building; 130-136 Connaught Road Central	2899	M.L. 354 M.L. 355 M.L. 356 M.L. 357 M.L. 358 M.L. 359 M.L. 360	999 years from 17 July 1900	
Connaught Road Central	Chu Kong Shipping Tower; 143 Connaught Road Central	2900	M.L. 306 M.L. 307 M.L. 340 M.L. 341	999 years from 1901	
Connaught Road Central	Guangdong Investment Tower; 148 Connaught Road Central	2899	M.L. 332 M.L. 333 M.L. 334 M.L. 335 M.L. 336	999 years from 17 July 1900	
Connaught Road West	Yardley Commercial Building; 3 Connaught Road West	2899/2900	M.L. 426 M.L. 425 M.L. 424	999 years and commencing between 1 December 1900 and 31 January 1901	
Connaught Road West	Seaview Commercial Building 21-24 Connaught Road West 43-47 New Market Street	2900/2902	M.L. 315 M.L. 314 M.L. 313 M.L. 312 M.L. 311	Marine Lot Nos. 311 and 312 are both held for a term of 999 years commencing from 19 June 1902 Marine Lot No. 313 is held for a term of 999 years commencing from 29 September 1902 Marine Lot No. 314 is held for a term of 999 years commencing from 16 November 1903 Marine Lot No. 315 is held for a term of 999 years commencing from 31 January 1901	
Connaught Road West	Talon Tower; 38 Connaught Road West	2870/2900	M.L. 522 I.L. 3268 I.L. 3267 I.L. 7129 M.L. 237 P.R.M.L. 237	Various Leases (ML 522, RP IL 3267, RP IL 7129, RP sB ML 237, RP IL 3268): 999 years commencing from 25 June 1871, 1 December 1900 and 9 April 1901	
Connaught Road West	Goldfield Building 42-44 Connaught Road West 200-202 Wing Lok Street	2870/2900	P.R.M.L. 238 I.L. 7127 M.L. 240 M.L. 238	999 years from 25 June 1871 and 9 April 1901	
Connaught Road West	Boc Credit Card Centre; 68 Connaught Road West	2899	M.L. 500	Sections A, B, C, D, E and The Remaining Portion of Marine Lot No. 500: 999 years commencing from 29 September 1900	
Connaught Road West	Sea View Mansion; 82-87 Connaught Road West	2900	M.L. 485 M.L. 486 M.L. 487 M.L. 488 M.L. 489	999 years from 9 April 1901	
Connaught Road West	95 Connaught Road West	2898	M.L. 402; M.L. 401	999 years commencing from 25 April 1899	
Connaught Road West	Wilmer Building 104-106 Connaught Road West 19-23 Wilmer Street	2897	M.L. 480 M.L. 481 M.L. 482	999 Years Commencing From 21 July 1898	
Connaught Road West	118 Connaught Road West	2894/2888	M.L. 534 M.L. 533 M.L. 532 M.L. 531 M.L. 530 M.L. 529 M.L. 528 M.L. 527 M.L. 475 M.L. 474 M.L. 473 M.L. 472 I.L. 2866 I.L. 2871 I.L. 2860 I.L. 2870 I.L. 2861	Various leases of 999 years commencing from 11 June 1895, 27 July 1898, 31 March 1898, 5 October 1889, 25 June 1897, 24 July 1895, 23 May 1895, 14 September 1895, and 10 March 1896	
Connaught Road West	Connaught Garden; 155 Connaught Road West	2891	M.L. 95	999 Years Commencing From 27 July 1892	
Connaught Road West	Richwealth Mansion; 158 Connaught Road West	2891	M.L. 95	999 Years Commencing From 27 July 1892	
Connaught Road West	Cheung Ling Mansion 162-164 Connaught Road West 8-10 Chiu Kwong St	2899	M.L. 461	999 Years Commencing From 27 August 1900	
Connaught Road West	Viking Court; 165-166 Connaught Road West	2896	M.L. 342 M.L. 343	999 Years Commencing From 29 September 1897	
Connaught Road West	Courtyard By Marriott Hong Kong; 167 Connaught Road West	2896	M.L. 344; M.L. 364	999 years commencing from 29 September 1897	
Connaught Road West	Upton; 180 Connaught Road West	2895	M.L. 434	999 Years commencing from 23 December 1896	
Connaught Road West	Hong Kong Plaza; 188 Connaught Road West	2902	M.L. 302; M.L. 289	ML 289: 75 years from 27 December 1904 and renewable for a further term of 75 years ML 302: 999 years from 3 September 1903	
Coronation Terrace	The Pierre No 1; 1 Coronation Terrace	2853	I.L. 100	999 Years commencing from 27 September 1854	
D'Aguilar Street	Century Square; 1-13 D'Aguilar Street	2842	I.L. 18 I.L. 18A	IL 18: 999 years commencing from 26 June 1843; IL 18A: 75 years extended to 999 years commencing on 26 June 1843	
Davis Street	1B-1E Davis Street	2891	M.L. 245	Marine Lot No. 245: 999 years from 24 June 1892	
Davis Street	Kennedy Bay; 1D Davis Street	2891	M.L. 245	Marine Lot No. 245: 999 years from 24 June 1892	
Davis Street	The Hudson; 11 Davis Street	2882	I.L. 906	999 years commencing from 24 June 1883	
Davis Street	Concord Hotel; 18 Davis Street	2882	I.L. 905	999 years from 24 September 1883	
Davis Street	On Fat Building; 28-32 Davis Street	2882	I.L. 905	999 years from 24 September 1883	
Davis Street	Sincere Western House; 34-42 Davis Street	2882	I.L. 905	999 years from 24 September 1883	
Des Voeux Road Central	Standard Chartered Bank Building; 4-4A Des Voeux Road Central	2854	M.L. 103		
Des Voeux Road Central	On Lok Yuen Building; 25-27A Des Voeux Road Central	2898	I.L. 2178	999 years from 6 December 1899	
Des Voeux Road Central	Wincome Centre; 39-41 Des Voeux Road Central	2899	I.L. 2183 I.L. 2184	999 years commencing May 1900	
Des Voeux Road Central	Wing Lung Bank Building; 45 Des Voeux Road Central	2899	M.L. 372 M.L. 373 M.L. 374 M.L. 409 I.L. 2185	999 years from 1900	
Des Voeux Road Central	Kincheng Bank Building; 55 Des Voeux Road Central	2899	I.L. 2185	999 years commencing from 9 October 1900	
Des Voeux Road Central	Man Yee Building; 68 Des Voeux Road Central	2843	M.L. 14	999 years commencing from 9 July 1844	
Des Voeux Road Central	Wing On House; 71 Des Voeux Road Central	2902	M.L. 381	ML 381: 999 years commencing from 15 August 1903	
Des Voeux Road Central	Chiyu Building; 78 Des Voeux Road Central	2842	I.L. 1622	IL 1622: 999 years commencing from 26 June 1843	
Des Voeux Road Central	Central 88; 88-98 Des Voeux Road Central	2843	I.L. 6946 I.L. 6947 I.L. 6983 I.L. 6984 I.L. 6985 I.L. 6986	IL 6946, 6947, 6983, 6984, 6985, 6986: 999 years commencing from 9 July 1844	
Des Voeux Road Central	Public Bank Centre; 120 Des Voeux Road Central	2842	I.L. 1959 I.L. 5041 I.L. 5040 I.L. 2000 I.L. 1999 I.L. 1998 I.L. 1997	999 years from 26 June 1843	
Des Voeux Road Central	Far East Consortium Building; 113-125A Des Voeux Road Central	2902	I.L. 2198 I.L. 2199 I.L. 2200 I.L. 2201 M.L. 299	Inland Lot No. 2198: 999 years commencing from 20 November 1903 Section A and The Remaining Portion of Inland Lot No. 2199, Inland Lot No. 2200 and Inland Lot No. 2201: 999 years commencing from 18 November 1903 Sections A, B and C of Marine Lot No. 299: 999 years commencing from 24 July 1903	
Des Voeux Road Central	Boc Group Life Assurance Tower 134-136 Des Voeux Road Central 35-43 Gilman's Bazaar	2842	I.L. 4793 I.L. 4794 I.L. 4795 I.L. 4796 I.L. 4797 I.L. 4798 I.L. 4799	IL 4793, 4794, 4795, 4796, 4797, 4798, 4799: 999 years commencing from 26 June 1843	
Des Voeux Road Central	China Insurance Group Building 141 Des Voeux Road Central 73 Connaught Road Central 61-65 Gilman Street	2902	M.L. 395	999 years commencing from 14 July 1903	
Des Voeux Road Central	Nanyang Commercial Bank Building; 151 Des Voeux Road Central	2902	I.L. 2632 I.L. 2631 M.L. 446 I.L. 2723	Discrepancy; the Street Index states IL 2723 is not part of the building's lots, while the reference (BOC Hong Kong) does IL 2631, 2632, ML 446: 999 years commencing from 19 September 1903 IL 2723: 999 years commencing from 5 November 1903	
Des Voeux Road Central	Li Po Chun Chambers; 189 Des Voeux Road Central	2901	M.L. 512 M.L. 513	The Remaining Portion of Marine Lot Nos. 512 and 513: 999 years commencing from 22 May 1902	
Des Voeux Road Central	Continental Place; 238 Des Voeux Road Central	2865	I.L. 1872 I.L. 1871 I.L. 1869 I.L. 1867	999 years commencing from 26 December 1866	
Des Voeux Road Central	Tung Hip Commercial Building; 244-248 Des Voeux Road Central	2865	I.L. 1556 I.L. 1557 I.L. 1866 I.L. 1865 I.L. 1864	IL 1864, 1865, 1866, 1556, 1557: 999 years commencing from 26 December 1866	
Des Voeux Road Central	Loon Kee Building; 267-275 Des Voeux Road Central	2900	M.L. 358 I.L. 2016 I.L. 2017 I.L. 2018 I.L. 2156	999 years from 1901	
Des Voeux Road Central	Shum Tower; 268 Des Voeux Road Central	2865	I.L. 1810 I.L. 1811 I.L. 1812 I.L. 1813	999 years from 26 December 1866	
Des Voeux Road Central	Hing Yip Commercial Centre; 272-284 Des Voeux Road Central	2865	I.L. 1814 I.L. 1815 I.L. 1816 I.L. 1817 I.L. 1818 I.L. 1819 I.L. 1820	999 years commencing from 26 December 1866	
Des Voeux Road Central	Kam Hong Building; 285 Des Voeux Road Central	2902	M.L. 307	999 years from 1903	
Des Voeux Road Central	Champion Building; 287-291 Des Voeux Road Central	2900	I.L. 2144 I.L. 2145 I.L. 2148	999 years from 1901	
Des Voeux Road Central	China Merchants Plaza; 303 Des Voeux Road Central	2899	M.L. 326 M.L. 327 M.L. 328 M.L. 329 M.L. 330 M.L. 331	999 years from 17 July 1900	
Des Voeux Road Central	FWD Financial Centre 308-320 Des Voeux Road Central 98-116 Wing Lok Street	2865	I.L. 1831 I.L. 1832 I.L. 1849 I.L. 1833 I.L. 1220 I.L. 1830 I.L. 1850	999 years from 26 December 1866	
Des Voeux Road West	9 Des Voeux Road West	2898	I.L. 3184 I.L. 3183 M.L. 503 M.L. 502 M.L. 504 M.L. 505 M.L. 506	999 years commencing on 28 November 1899, 8 January 1900 and 28 May 1900	
Des Voeux Road West	Western Commercial Building; 29-31 Des Voeux Road West	2899	I.L. 3176 I.L. 3175	999 years commencing from 20 September 1900	
Des Voeux Road West	Kingdom Power Commercial Building; 32-36 Des Voeux Road West	2865	M.L. 37; I.L. 1168	999 years commencing from 1866	
Des Voeux Road West	33-49 Des Voeux Road West	2899	I.L. 3175 I.L. 3174 I.L. 3173 M.L. 497 I.L. 3172 I.L. 3171 I.L. 3170	999 years commencing from 29 September 1900	
Des Voeux Road West	Overseas Trust Bank Building; 51-57 Des Voeux Road West	2899	I.L. 3167 I.L. 3168 I.L. 3169 I.L. 3170	999 years commencing from 29 September 1900	
Des Voeux Road West	Kam Chuen Mansion; 59-61 Des Voeux Road West	2900	I.L. 3166	999 Years Commencing From 3 October 1901	
Des Voeux Road West	Ka Yue Building; 63-65 Des Voeux Road West	2900	I.L. 3165	999 Years Commencing From 3 October 1901	
Des Voeux Road West	Princeton Tower; 88 Des Voeux Road West	2900	I.L. 4005 I.L. 4004 I.L. 4003 I.L. 4002 I.L. 4001 I.L. 4000 I.L. 3999	999 Years Commencing From 3 October 1901	
Des Voeux Road West	Ava128; 124-128 Des Voeux Road West	2897	I.L. 2966 I.L. 2967 I.L. 2968	999 years commencing from 1898	
Des Voeux Road West	Hong Ming Building; 227-233 Des Voeux Road West	2891	I.L. 5116 I.L. 5117 I.L. 5118 I.L. 5119	The remaining portion of Inland Lot Nos. 5116, 5117, 5118 and 5119: 999 years commencing from 27 July 1892	
Des Voeux Road West	228 Des Voeux Road West	2854	I.L. 3914	999 years from 1 October 1855	
Des Voeux Road West	Liang Ga Building; 296-302 Des Voeux Road West	2861	I.L. 4495 I.L. 4496 I.L. 4497 I.L. 4498	999 Years Commencing From 7 January 1862	
Des Voeux Road West	Bohemian House; 321 Des Voeux Road West	2896	I.L. 2155 M.L. 344 M.L. 364	999 Years commencing From 29 September 1897	
Des Voeux Road West	Hang Yue Building; 334-350 Des Voeux Road West	2861	M.L. 204 I.L. 5288	999 Years Commencing From 7 January 1862	
Des Voeux Road West	Kwan Yick Building Phase II; 343 Des Voeux Road West	2861/2895	M.L. 432 M.L. 433 P.R.M.L. 198	ML 432, 433: 999 years from 6 June 1896; Praya Reclamation to the Remaining Portion of ML 198: 999 years from 7 January 1862	
Des Voeux Road West	Lun Fung Court; 363 Des Voeux Road West	2902	M.L. 302	999 Years Commencing From 3 September 1903	
Des Voeux Road West	Grace Mansion; 374-376 Des Voeux Road West	2860	M.L. 186	999 Years Commencing From 25 June 1861	
Des Voeux Road West	Chong Yip Centre; 402-404 Des Voeux Road West	2860	I.L. 1743	999 years commencing from 1861	
Harbour One; 458 Des Voeux Road West	2864	M.L. 126	999 years from 24 December 1865		
Duddell Street	Diamond Exchange Building 8-10 Duddell Street 20 Ice House Street	2848	I.L. 339	999 years commencing from 11 May 1849	
Elgin Street	24 Elgin Street	2844	I.L. 118	999 years commencing from 12 March 1845	
Elgin Street	Million City; 28 Elgin Street	2844	I.L. 118 I.L. 119	IL 118: 999 Years Commencing From 12 March 1845; IL 119: 999 Years Commencing From 16 May 1845	
Elgin Street	Kam Tong Court; 47A Elgin Street	2844	I.L. 121	999 years from 22 January 1845	
Elgin Street	The Elgin; 51 Elgin Street	2854	I.L. 126	999 years from 1 February 1855	
First Street	Charming Court; 55 First Street	2844	I.L. 289	999 Years Commencing From 12 December 1845	
First Street	Chun King Court; 83 First Street	2854/2861	I.L. 448 I.L. 447 I.L. 493	IL 447, IL 448: 999 Years Commencing From 7 January 1862; IL 493: 999 Years Commencing From 1 October 1855	
First Street	Shun Tai Building; 129 First Street	2854/2856	I.L. 490 I.L. 489	IL 489 S.A SS.1, S.A SS.2, S.A SS.3, S.A RP: 999 Years Commencing From 1 October 1855; IL 490 S.A SS.1 RP, S.B SS1, S.B SS.2, S.B RP: 999 Years Commencing From 1 September 1857	
Forbes Street	Luen Tak Apartments; 34 Forbes Street	2882	I.L. 906	999 years commencing from 24 June 1883	
Forbes Street	Luen Fat Apartments; 38 Forbes Street	2882	I.L. 906	999 years commencing from 24 June 1883	
Garden Road	Consulate General of the United States, Hong Kong and Macau; 26 Garden Road	2949	I.L. 6622	Backdated to start on 9 April 1950	
Gage Street	Lyndhurst Building; 2-6 Gage Street	2843	I.L. 106	999 years from 22 January 1844	
Glenealy	Glenealy Tower; 1 Glenealy	2842	I.L. 140	999 Years Commencing From 26 June 1843	
Glenealy	Greenview; 2 Glenealy	2842	I.L. 140	999 Years Commencing From 26 June 1843	
Glenealy	Central Residence by the Park; 6 Glenealy	2842	I.L. 140 I.L. 7986	999 Years Commencing From 26 June 1843	
Glenealy	Glenealy Building; 7 Glenealy	2842	I.L. 140	999 Years Commencing From 26 June 1843	
Glenealy	8 Glenealy	2842	I.L. 140	999 Years Commencing From 26 June 1843	
Glenealy	9 Glenealy	2842	I.L. 140	999 Years Commencing From 26 June 1843	
Glenealy	10 Glenealy	2842	I.L. 140	999 Years Commencing From 26 June 1843	
Graham Street	Kar Ho Building; 35-39 Graham Street	2853	I.L. 192 I.L. 196	999 Years Commencing From 21 February 1854	
Hau Wo Street	Shun Fai Building; 19 Hau Wo Street	2891	I.L. 1297	999 Years Commencing From 24 June 1892	
Hau Wo Street	Hau Wo Court; 25-33 Hau Wo Street	2891	I.L. 1297	999 Years Commencing From 24 June 1892	
Hau Wo Street	Chi Ping Building; 38 Hau Wo Street	2891	I.L. 1297	999 Years Commencing From 24 June 1892	
High Street	Ko Chun Court; 11 High Street	2860	I.L. 4042 I.L. 4041	999 Years Commencing From 25 June 1861	
High Street	High House; 19A-19B High Street	2860	I.L. 686	999 Years Commencing From 25 June 1861	
High Street	Cheong King Court; 26-38 High Street	2860	I.L. 691 I.L. 6484 I.L. 6483 I.L. 6482 I.L. 6481 I.L. 6480 I.L. 6479	999 Years Commencing From 25 June 1861	
High Street	Aspen Court; 46 High St	2860	I.L. 692	999 Years Commencing From 25 June 1861	
High Street	Wealthy Building; 53-65 High St	2860	I.L. 692	999 Years Commencing From 25 June 1861	
High Street	Lai Yin Court; 80-86 High Street	2860	I.L. 694	999 Years Commencing From 25 June 1861	
High Street	Lechler Court; 97 High Street	2860	I.L. 681	999 Years Commencing From 25 June 1861	
High Street	Kensington Hill; 98 High Street	2861	I.L. 767	999 Years commencing from 7 January 1862	
High Street	One Eleven; 111 High Street	2860	I.L. 679	999 years commencing from 25 June 1861	
Hill Road	Goa Building; 20-24 Hill Road	2860	I.L. 676	999 Years Commencing From 25 June 1861	
Hill Road	Hill Court; 28 Hill Road	2860	I.L. 676	999 Years Commencing From 25 June 1861	
Hill Road	Jadeview Court; 38 Hill Road	2890	I.L. 1300	999 Years Commencing From 25 December 1891	
Hill Road	Nam Cheong Building; 48-52 Hill Road	2890	I.L. 1300	999 Years Commencing From 25 December 1891	
Hill Road	Sik On House; 54-66 Hill Road	2890	I.L. 1802	999 Years Commencing From 25 December 1891	
Hill Road	Fortune Villa; 63 Hill Road	2861	I.L. 4936 I.L. 4937 I.L. 4938	999 Years Commencing From 30 June 1862	
Hill Road	Eivissa Crest; 100 Hill Road	2886	I.L. 1095	999 Years commencing From 20 December 1887	
Hing Hon Road	Mai Hing House; 3-4 Hing Hon Road	2861	I.L. 757	999 Years commencing from 7 January 1862	
Hing Hon Road	The Summa; 23 Hing Hon Road	2861	I.L. 757	999 Years commencing from 7 January 1862	
Hollywood Road	Tai Ping Mansion; 18 Hollywood Road; 21-27 Tai Ping Shan Street	2857	I.L. 356; I.L. 569	999 Years Commencing From 1858	
Hollywood Road	Amber Lodge; 23 Hollywood Road	2843	I.L. 4477 I.L. 4476 I.L. 4475	999 Years Commencing From 22 January 1844	
Hollywood Road	Emperor Hollywood Centre; 151 Hollywood Road	2876	I.L. 853	999 years from 5 February 1877	
Hollywood Road	Holly Court; 156-158 Hollywood Road	2843	I.L. 256	999 Years Commencing From 22 January 1844	
Hollywood Road	Kee On Building; 200 Hollywood Road	2854	I.L. 354	999 Years Commencing From 16 March 1855	
Hollywood Road	Ovolo; 222 Hollywood Road	2860	I.L. 699	999 years commencing from 25 June 1861	
Hollywood Road	Travelodge Central, Hollywood Road; 263 Hollywood Road	2857	I.L. 8412 I.L. 568	999 years commencing from 8 March 1858 and Conditions of Sale No. 11265 for a term of 75 years renewable for 75 years commencing from 30 October 1978	
Hospital Road	Wing Wa Mansion; 10-12 Hospital Road	2888	I.L. 1221	999 Years Commencing From 27 May 1889	
Hospital Road	Winner Court; 18 Hospital Road	2888	I.L. 1221	999 Years Commencing From 27 May 1889	
Ice House Street	Baskerville House; 22 Ice House Street		I.L. 644		
Ice House Street	Shun Ho Tower; 24-30 Ice House Street	2864	I.L. 7579; I.L. 617	Condition of Exchange No. 6233: 999 years commencing from 25 June 1865	
Jervois Street	The Mercer; 29 Jervois Street	2842/2851	M.L. 9B I.L. 872 I.L. 871	ML 9B: 999 years from 15 January 1852 IL 871 sA: 999 years from 26 June 1843 IL 872: 999 years from 26 June 1843	
Jervois Street	Kin On Commercial Building; 49-51 Jervois Street	2841	I.L. 886 I.L. 887	999 years from 1842	
Jubilee Street	Haleson Building; 1 Jubilee Street	2842	I.L. 1539 I.L. 1540 I.L. 1541 I.L. 1542 I.L. 6953 I.L. 6954 I.L. 6955 I.L. 6966	999 years from 26 June 1843	
Kennedy Road	Kennedy Park At Central; 4 Kennedy Road	2895	I.L. 1381	999 Years commencing from 13 July 1896	
Kennedy Road	Kennedy Heights; 10-18 Kennedy Road	2895	I.L. 1381	999 Years Commencing From 13 July 1896	
Kennedy Road	Chenyu Court; 22-24 Kennedy Road	2888	I.L. 1219	999 Years Commencing From 1889	
Kennedy Road	Union Church; 22A Kennedy Road	2896	I.L. 1219	The Union Church holds a 999-year lease from 1897; The church was demolished in 2017 and work began to turn it into a residential building, with a church at its base	
Kennedy Road	Yale Lodge; 30 Kennedy Road	2895	I.L. 1379	999 Years Commencing From 1896	
Kennedy Road	Kenville Building; 32 Kennedy Road	2895	I.L. 7981	999 Years Commencing From 1896	
Kennedy Town New Praya	Wah Po Building; 1 Kennedy Town New Praya	2891	M.L. 242	999 Years Commencing From 24 June 1892	
Kennedy Town New Praya	Blessing House; 1A Kennedy Town New Praya	2891	M.L. 242	999 Years Commencing From 24 June 1892	
Kennedy Town New Praya	Tung Fat Building; 1B-1C Kennedy Town New Praya	2891	M.L. 242	999 Years Commencing From 24 June 1892	
Kennedy Town New Praya	New Fortune House; 2-5A Kennedy Town New Praya	2891	M.L. 242	999 Years Commencing From 24 June 1892	
Kennedy Town New Praya	Hing Wong Building; 23 Kennedy Town New Praya	2891	M.L. 245	999 years commencing from 24 June 1892	
Kennedy Town New Praya	Ka Fu Building; 25 Kennedy Town New Praya; 63 Catchick St	2891	M.L. 245	999 Years Commencing From 24 June 1892	
Kennedy Town New Praya	Ka On Building 27 Kennedy Town New Praya 65 Catchick Street	2891	M.L. 245	999 Years Commencing From 24 June 1892	
Kennedy Town New Praya	Manhattan Heights; 28 Kennedy Town New Praya	2891	M.L. 245	999 years from 24 June 1892	
Kennedy Town Praya	Chester Court 6-8 Kennedy Town Praya 1G-1K Belcher's Street	2885	M.L. 260; M.L. 261	999 Years Commencing From 25 October 1886	
Kennedy Town Praya	Lung Cheung Garden; 26 Kennedy Town Praya	2877	M.L. 266	999 Years Commencing From 14 October 1878	
Kennedy Town Praya	Kennedy Town Building; 27 Kennedy Town Praya	2877/2880	M.L. 266; M.L. 267	ML 266: 999 Years Commencing From 14 October 1878 ML 267: 999 Years Commencing From 11 October 1881	
Kennedy Town Praya	Manhattan Heights; 28 Kennedy Town Praya	2891	M.L. 245	999 years commencing from 24 June 1892	
Kennedy Town Praya	Grand Fortune Mansion; 32-35 Kennedy Town Praya	2891	M.L. 245	999 years commencing from 24 June 1892	
Kennedy Town Praya	Tai Hong Building 35 Kennedy Town Praya 1A-1G Holland Street	2872	M.L. 300	999 Years Commencing From 31 March 1873	
Kennedy Town Praya	Nan Hai Mansion; 46-47 Kennedy Town Praya	2872	M.L. 301	999 Years Commencing From 31 March 1873	
Jade Court 48-49 Kennedy Town Praya 35A Belcher's Street	2872	M.L. 301	999 Years Commencing From 31 March 1873		
Ko Shing Street	Hang Cheong Tai Building; 21-23 Ko Shing Street	2899	I.L. 4101 I.L. 4100	999 Years Commencing From 29 September 1900	
Ko Shing Street	Everprofit Commercial Building; 34-36 Ko Shing Street	2842	M.L. 58	999 Years Commencing From 26 June 1843	
Ko Shing Street	Urbana 38; 38-40 Ko Shing Street	2842	M.L. 58	999 Years Commencing From 26 June 1843	
Ko Shing Street	Elite's Place; 68-82 Ko Shing Street	2853	M.L. 71	999 years from 21 February 1854	
Kom U Street	Kam Yu Mansion; 8 Kom U Street	2842	M.L. 58	999 Years Commencing From 26 June 1843	
Kotewall Road	Villa Veneto; 3 Kotewall Road	2885	I.L. 946	999 Years Commencing From 21 June 1886	
Kotewall Road	Dragonview Court; 5 Kotewall Road	2885	I.L. 946	999 Years Commencing From 21 June 1886	
Kotewall Road	Serene Court; 8 Kotewall Road	2885	I.L. 947	999 Years Commencing From 21 June 1886	
Kotewall Road	Scenic Garden; 9 Kotewall Road	2885	I.L. 947	999 Years Commencing From 21 June 1886	
Kui Yan Lane	Kui Yan Court; 3 Kui Yan Lane	2861	I.L. 5815 I.L. 5816 I.L. 5817 I.L. 5818 I.L. 5819	999 Years Commencing From 30 June 1862	
Kwai Heung Street	The Met Sublime; 1 Kwai Heung Street	2854	I.L. 1262	999 years from 4 August 1855	
Li Po Lung Path	Po Wah House; 36-40 Li Po Lung Path	2872	M.L. 239 I.L. 2689 I.L. 2688	999 Years Commencing From 31 March 1873	
Lower Albert Road	Hong Kong Sheng Kung Hui Compound Hong Kong Juvenile Care Centre Bishop's House Central Hospital 1-1B Lower Albert Road	2849	I.L. 7360	Inland Lot No. 7360: 999 years commencing from 19 April 1850	
Lyttelton Road	Park View Court; 1 Lyttelton Road	2884	I.L. 930	999 Years Commencing From 22 June 1885	
Lyttelton Road	Lyttelton Garden; 17-29 Lyttelton Road	2861	I.L. 1216	999 years commencing from 25 June 1862	
Lyttelton Road	31-37 Lyttelton Road	2861	I.L. 1216	999 years commencing from 25 June 1862	
Lyttelton Road	Fook Wah Mansions; 43-53 Lyttelton Road	2861	I.L. 1216	999 years commencing from 25 June 1862	
Lyttelton Road	Scholastic Garden; 48 Lyttelton Road	2861	I.L. 609	999 years commencing from 1862	
Lyttelton Road	Glory Heights; 52 Lyttelton Road	2861	I.L. 609	999 Years Commencing From 25 June 1862	
Lyttelton Road	Greenland Garden; 67-69 Lyttelton Road	2861	I.L. 1216	999 years commencing from 25 June 1862	
Lyttelton Road	Hanwin Mansion; 71-77 Lyttelton Road	2861	I.L. 1216	999 years commencing from 25 June 1862	
Macdonnell Road	Macdonnell House; 6-8 Macdonnell Road	2896	I.L. 1416	999 years commencing from 14 June 1897	
Macdonnell Road	Hoover Court; 7-9 Macdonnell Road	2895	I.L. 1381	999 Years Commencing From 13 July 1896	
Macdonnell Road	Woodland Garden; 10 Macdonnell Road	2896	I.L. 1416	999 Years Commencing From 14 June 1897	
Macdonnell Road	Wilshire Park; 12-14 Macdonnell Road	2896	I.L. 1416	999 Years Commencing From 14 June 1897	
Macdonnell Road	St. Louis Mansion; 20 Macdonnell Road	2896	I.L. 1416	999 Years Commencing From 14 June 1897	
Macdonnell Road	Silvercrest; 24 Macdonnell Road	2896	I.L. 1416	999 Years Commencing From 14 June 1897	
Macdonnell Road	Park Mansions; 27-29 Macdonnell Road	2895	I.L. 1381 I.L. 3092	999 Years Commencing From 13 July 1896	
Macdonnell Road	Wealthy Heights; 35 Macdonnell Road	2895	I.L. 1380	999 Years Commencing From 13 July 1896	
Macdonnell Road	35 Macdonnell Road Substation; 35 Macdonnell Road	2895	I.L. 1380	999 Years Commencing From 13 July 1896	
Macdonnell Road	Eva Court; 36 Macdonnell Road	2895	I.L. 1388	999 Years Commencing From 26 October 1896	
Macdonnell Road	Morning Light Apartments; 38A-38D Macdonnell Road	2895	I.L. 1388	999 years from 26 October 1896	
Macdonnell Road	Dragon View; 39 Macdonnell Road	2895	I.L. 1388	999 years from 26 October 1896	
Macdonnell Road	St Paul's Terrace; 42A Macdonnell Road	2895	I.L. 1388	999 Years Commencing From 26 October 1896	
Macdonnell Road	Happy Mansion; 42B-42E Macdonnell Road	2895	I.L. 1388	999 years from 26 October 1896	
Macdonnell Road	Visalia Garden; 48 Macdonnell Road	2895	I.L. 1388	999 Years Commencing From 26 October 1896	
May Road	Clovelly Court; 12 May Road	2887	I.L. 7393; I.L. 1206	999 years commencing from 5 November 1888	
Mercer Street	Kam Tak Building; 20-24 Mercer Street	2842	I.L. 871 I.L. 872	999 years commencing from 26 June 1843	
Mosque Junction	Losion Villa; 8 Mosque Junction	2854	I.L. 716	999 Years Commencing From 17 March 1855	
Mosque Junction	Sherwood Court; 17 Mosque Junction	2848/2854	I.L. 392; I.L. 348	IL 348: 999 Years Commencing From 27 November 1849 IL 392: 999 Years Commencing From 17 March 1855	
Mosque Street	Fook Kee Court; 6 Mosque Street	2856	I.L. 58	999 Years Commencing From 1 September 1857	
Mosque Street	Central 8; 8 Mosque Street	2856	I.L. 58	999 years commencing from 1 September 1857	
Mosque Street	14-18 Mosque Street	2856	I.L. 58	999 years from 1 September 1857	
Mosque Street	Ryan Mansion; 31-37 Mosque Street	2848	I.L. 343	999 Years Commencing From 27 November 1849	
Mount Davis Road	Chiu Yuen Cemetery	2896	I.L. 8122	999 years from 1 March 1897	
Mount Kellett Road	Chateau De Peak; 8 Mount Kellett Road	2842	R.B.L. 1045	999 Years Commencing From 26 June 1843	
New Street	19 New Street	2865	I.L. 416	I.L. 416: 999 Years Commencing from 25 June 1866	Land Registry
North Street	Cheong Yue Mansion; 13-19 North Street	2891	M.L. 242	999 Years Commencing From 24 June 1892	
Oaklands Path	Hing Wah Mansions; 2-8 Oaklands Path	2861	I.L. 2182	999 Years Commencing From 25 June 1862	
Old Bailey Street	Sunrise House; 21-31 Old Bailey Street	2843	I.L. 5414 I.L. 5415 I.L. 5416 I.L. 5417	999 Years Commencing From 22 January 1844	
Old Peak Road	Pine Court; 5 Old Peak Road	2859	I.L. 646 I.L. 647	999 Years Commencing From 26 December 1860	
Old Peak Road	Dynasty Court; 23 Old Peak Road	2886	I.L. 1093 I.L. 1218	999 years commencing from 3 October 1887	
On Lan Street	18 On Lan; 18 On Lan Street	2864	I.L. 2113 I.L. 2114 I.L. 2115 I.L. 2116	999 year commencing from 1865	
Park Road	Parkway Court; 4 Park Road	2858	I.L. 591	999 Years Commencing From 25 June 1859	
Park Road	Euston Court; 6 Park Road	2861	I.L. 591	999 Years Commencing From 25 June 1859	
Park Road	Parksdale 6A Park Road 54 Bonham Road	2861	I.L. 2036	999 Years Commencing From 7 January 1862	
Pedder Street	Central Building; 1-3 Pedder Street	2842	M.L. 3 M.L. 5 M.L. 7	999 years commencing from 26 June 1843	
Pedder Street	Wheelock House; 20 Pedder Street	2854	M.L. 99 M.L. 100	Marine Lot No 99 and Marine Lot No 100: 999 years commencing from 16 November 1855	
Peel Street	Chung Hing Court; 67 Peel Street	2843	I.L. 101	999 Years Commencing From 22 January 1844	
Peel Street	Ying Pont Building; 69-71 Peel Street	2843	I.L. 101	999 Years Commencing From 22 January 1844	
Peel Street	Rich Court 88 Peel Street 43-45 Mosque Junction	2848	I.L. 343	999 Years Commencing From 27 November 1849	
Po Tuck Street	Poga Building; 6-20 Po Tuck Street	2861	I.L. 4895 I.L. 4896 I.L. 4897 I.L. 4898 I.L. 4899 I.L. 4900 I.L. 4901 I.L. 4902	999 Years Commencing From 30 June 1862	
Po Tuck Street	Yen Oi Garden; 9-15 Po Tuck St	2861	I.L. 4916 I.L. 4917 I.L. 4918 I.L. 4919	999 Years Commencing From 30 June 1862	
Pok Fu Lam Road	33 & 33A Pok Fu Lam Road	2861	I.L. 5821	Inland Lot No. 5821: 999 years commencing from 30 June 1862	
Pok Fu Lam Road	Manifold Court; 36-46 Pok Fu Lam Road	2860	I.L. 679	999 Years Commencing From 25 June 1861	
Pok Fu Lam Road	63 Pokfulam; 63 Pok Fu Lam Road	2861	I.L. 5846 I.L. 5847 I.L. 5848 I.L. 5849 I.L. 5850 I.L. 5851 I.L. 6013 I.L. 6014 I.L. 6015 I.L. 6016 I.L. 6017	999 years from 30 June 1862	
Pok Fu Lam Road	Kingsfield Tower 64-68 Pok Fu Lam Road 73-83 Bonham Road	2861	I.L. 753	999 Years Commencing From 7 January 1862	
Pok Fu Lam Road	Po Lam Court; 67 Pok Fu Lam Road	2861	I.L. 6018	999 Years Commencing From 30 June 1862	
Pok Fu Lam Road	King Ming Mansion; 69 Pok Fu Lam Road	2861	I.L. 6019 I.L. 6020 I.L. 6021 I.L. 6022 I.L. 6023	999 Years Commencing From 30 June 1862	
Pok Fu Lam Road	Tsui On Court; 71 Pok Fu Lam Road	2886	I.L. 8029	999 Years Commencing From 20 December 1887	
Pok Fu Lam Road	Charmview Court; 73 Pok Fu Lam Road	2886	I.L. 1095	999 Years Commencing From 20 December 1887	
Pok Fu Lam Road	Fairview Court; 75 Pok Fu Lam Road	2886	I.L. 1095	999 Years Commencing From 20 December 1887	
Pok Fu Lam Road	Bowie Court; 77 Pok Fu Lam Road	2886	I.L. 1095	999 Years Commencing From 20 December 1887	
Pok Fu Lam Road	Academic Terrace; 101 Pok Fu Lam Road	2886	I.L. 2687; I.L. 2690	999 Years Commencing From 1873	
Pottinger Street	22 Pottinger Street	2842	I.L. 5158	IL 5158: 999 years commencing from 26 June 1843	
Pottinger Street	Car Po Commercial Building 37-43 Pottinger Street 18-20 Lyndhurst Terrace	2842	I.L. 2 I.L. 41	999 years from 26 June 1843	
Prince's Terrace	Bonito Casa; 4 Prince's Terrace	2843	I.L. 151	999 Years Commencing From 22 January 1844	
Prince's Terrace	Nikken Heights; 12 Prince's Terrace	2843/2870	I.L. 151 I.L. 152A I.L. 152	IL 151: 999 Years Commencing From 22 January 1844 IL 152A: 999 Years Commencing From 25 June 1849 IL 152: 999 Years Commencing From 26 December 1871	
Queen's Road Central	HSBC New Headquarters; 1 Queen's Road Central	2854	I.L. 3566; M.L. 104	M.L. 104: 999 years from 16 November 1855 I.L. 3566: 75 years renewable for 75 years from 1 January 1934	
Queen's Road Central	Nine Queen's Road Central; 9 Queen's Road Central	2854/2856	M.L. 101 M.L. 102 M.L. 103 I.L. 514	IL 514: 999 years commencing from 21 January 1857; ML 101, 102, 103: 999 years commencing from 16 November 1855	
Queen's Road Central	The Landmark Edinburgh Tower 15 Queen's Road Central	2842	M.L. 2 M.L. 2A M.L. 3	ML 2, 2A: 981 years commencing from 25 June 1861; ML 3: 999 years commencing from 26 June 1843	
Queen's Road Central	New World Tower; 16-18 Queen's Road Central	2845/2863	I.L. 294A I.L. 295 I.L. 31	Inland Lot Nos. 294A and 295: 982 years commencing from 25 June 1863; Inland Lot No. 31: 999 years commencing from 25 June 1864	
Queen's Road Central	Asia Standard Tower 59-65 Queen's Road Central 2-10 Li Yuen Street West	2842	I.L. 5148 I.L. 5149 I.L. 5150 I.L. 5151 I.L. 5152 I.L. 5153 I.L. 5189 I.L. 5188 I.L. 5187 I.L. 5186 I.L. 5185	999 years commencing from 26 June 1843	
Queen's Road Central	Crawford House; 70 Queen's Road Central	2842	I.L. 7; I.L. 45	999 years commencing from 26 June 1843	
Queen's Road Central	Wings Building 110-116 Queen's Road Central 53-61 Stanley Street	2842	I.L. 6159 I.L. 6160 I.L. 6161 I.L. 6162 I.L. 6165 I.L. 6166 I.L. 6168 I.L. 43	Inland Lot Nos. 6159, 6160, 6161, 6162, 6165, 6166, 6168 and 43: 999 years commencing from 26 June 1843	
Queen's Road Central	V. Heun Building; 138 Queen's Road Central	2842/2843	I.L. 165 I.L. 161 I.L. 167	IL 161, 165, 167: 999 years from 1843 and 1844	
Queen's Road Central	Siu Ying Commercial Building 151-155 Queen's Road Central 1-1B Wing Kut Street	2842	I.L. 5334 I.L. 5333 I.L. 5332 I.L. 5336	The Remaining Portion of Inland Lot No 5334, The Remaining Portion of Inland Lot No 5333, The Remaining Portion of Inland Lot No 5332 and Inland Lot No 5336: 999 years commencing from 26 June 1843	
Queen's Road Central	Tern Centre Tower I 237 Queen's Road Central	2842/2843	I.L. 202 I.L. 1482 I.L. 117	IL 202, IL 1842: 999 years commencing from 2 December 1844; IL 117: 999 years commencing from 26 June 1843	
Queen's Road Central	Tern Centre Tower II 251 Queen's Road Central	2842	I.L. 117A I.L. 117B I.L. 117C I.L. 117D I.L. 99	IL 99 s.B, IL 117A s.A RP, IL 117B s.A, IL 117C, IL 117D: 999 years commencing from 26 June 1843	
Queen's Road Central	Hollywood Terrace; 268 Queen's Road Central	2047/2876	I.L. 8732; I.L. 850	999 years commencing from 5 February 1877 and Conditions of Grant No. 12131 for a term commencing from 25 February 1991 until 30 June 2047	
Queen's Road Central	Central House; 270-276 Queen's Road Central	2842	I.L. 48	999 years commencing from 26 June 1843	
Queen's Road Central	Carbo Mansion; 321-329 Queen's Road Central	2842	I.L. 163A I.L. 163	999 Years Commencing From 26 June 1843	
Queen's Road Central	338 Queen's Road Central		I.L. 1787 I.L. 1786 I.L. 1785 I.L. 1792 I.L. 1791 I.L. 213		
Queen's Road Central	Nan Dao Commercial Building; 359-361 Queen's Road Central	2851	M.L. 67A	999 years from 7 February 1852	
Queen's Road West	Ko Shing Building 78-80 Queen's Road West 265-267 Hollywood Road	2860	I.L. 4694 I.L. 4695 I.L. 4696 I.L. 4697	999 years commencing from 1861	
Queen's Road West	Largos Residences; 110 Queen's Road West	2842	M.L. 58	Remaining Portion of Marine Lot No. 58: 999 years commencing from 26 June 1843	
Queen's Road West	Kiu Fat Building; 115-119 Queen's Road West	2842	M.L. 58	Remaining Portion of Marine Lot No. 58: 999 years commencing from 26 June 1843	
Queen's Road West	Macro Garden; 128 Queen's Road West	2861/2875	I.L. 761 I.L. 664	IL 761: 999 Years Commencing From 7 January 1862; IL 664: 999 Years Commencing From 25 June 1876	
Queen's Road West	The Queen's; 160 Queen's Road West	2855	I.L. 4549 I.L. 4550 I.L. 4551 I.L. 4552 I.L. 4553 I.L. 4554 I.L. 4555	I.L. 4549: 999 years commencing from 10 September 1856 I.L. 4550: 999 years commencing from 10 September 1856 I.L. 4551: 999 years commencing from 10 September 1856 I.L. 4552: 999 years commencing from 10 September 1856 I.L. 4553: 999 years commencing from 10 September 1856 I.L. 4554: 999 years commencing from 10 September 1856 I.L. 4555: 999 years commencing from 10 September 1856	
Queen's Road West	SOHO 189; 189 Queen's Road West	2853/2861	I.L. 6634 I.L. 6635 I.L. 6636 I.L. 6637 I.L. 6638 M.L. 71 M.L. 200	Marine Lot No. 71: 999 years from 21 February 1854 Marine Lot No. 200: 999 years from 30 June 1862 Inland Lot No. 6634, 6635, 6636, 6637, 6638: 999 years from the 21 February 1854	
Queen's Road West	Queen's Hotel; 199 Queen's Road West		M.L. 90		
Queen's Road West	Wo Yick Mansion; 263 Queen's Road West	2854	I.L. 1262	999 Years Commencing From 4 August 1855	
Queen's Road West	Fung King Court; 288 Queen's Road West	2844	I.L. 289	999 Years Commencing From 12 December 1845	
Queen's Road West	Federate Building 292-298 Queen's Road West 63-65 First Street	2876	I.L. 32	999 Years Commencing From 22 January 1877	
Queen's Road West	Andes Plaza; 323 Queen's Road West	2854	I.L. 6137 I.L. 6136 I.L. 6135 I.L. 6134 I.L. 6133 I.L. 6132 I.L. 6131 I.L. 6130	999 Years Commencing From 1 October 1855	
Queen's Road West	New Start Building; 330-336 Queen's Road West	2854	I.L. 492	999 Years Commencing From 1 October 1855	
Queen's Road West	Kenbo Commercial Building; 335-339 Queen's Road West	2854	I.L. 1270	999 years from 1 October 1855	
Queen's Road West	Kensington Mansion; 353 Queen's Road West	2854	I.L. 1270	999 Years Commencing From 1 October 1855	
Queen's Road West	Imperial Terrace; 356 Queen's Road West	2854-2856	I.L. 490 I.L. 489	IL 490 S.C: 999 Years Commencing From 1 September 1857; IL 489 S.B: 999 Years Commencing From 1 October 1855	
Queen's Road West	Rockson Mansion; 371-379 Queen's Road West	2861	I.L. 4518 I.L. 4519 I.L. 4520 I.L. 4521 I.L. 4522	999 Years Commencing From 7 January 1862	
Queen's Road West	Wah Ming Centre 421 Queen's Road West 394-400 Des Voeux Road West	2860/2876	M.L. 185 I.L. 38	ML 185 R.P.: 999 Years Commencing From 25 June 1861; ML 38 R.P.: 999 Years Commencing From 12 March 1877	
Queen's Road West	West Grand Court; 403-405 Queen's Road West	2861	I.L. 5294 I.L. 5295	999 Years Commencing From 7 January 1862	
Queen's Road West	Tung Wai Garden; 419G Queen's Road West	2863	M.L. 205	999 Years Commencing From 16 November 1864	
Queen's Road West	Grand Scholar; 419K Queen's Road West	2863	M.L. 205	999 years commencing from 16 November 1864	
Queen's Road West	Nice Garden; 513 Queen's Road West	2860	M.L. 177	999 Years Commencing From 25 June 1861	
Queen's Road West	Joy Fat House; 522-530 Queen's Road West	2860	I.L. 675	999 Years Commencing From 25 June 1861	
Queen's Road West	Sun King House; 576-584 Queen's Road West	2861	I.L. 671	999 Years Commencing From 7 January 1862	
Queen Victoria Street	Hung Kei Mansion; 5-8 Queen Victoria Street	2842	I.L. 1622	999 years commencing from 26 June 1843	
Rednaxela Terrace	The Rednaxela; 1 Rednaxela Terrace	2858	I.L. 584	999 Years Commencing From 25 June 1859	
Robinson Road	1A Robinson Road		I.L. 648		
Robinson Road	Robinson Heights; 8 Robinson Road	2844/2857	I.L. 579 I.L. 59	IL 59: 999 years from 12 December 1845; IL 579: 999 years from 8 March 1858	
Robinson Road	Regal Crest; 9 Robinson Road	2859	I.L. 645	999 Years Commencing From 26 December 1860	
Robinson Road	Roc Ye Court; 11 Robinson Road	2860	I.L. 3780	999 Years Commencing From 25 June 1861	
Robinson Road	Good View Court; 21 Robinson Road	2860	I.L. 3777	999 Years Commencing From 25 June 1861	
Robinson Road	Floral Tower 22 Robinson Road 1-9 Mosque St	2848-2860	I.L. 717 I.L. 347 I.L. 392	IL 347: 999 Years Commencing From 27 November 1849 IL 392: 999 Years Commencing From 17 March 1855 IL 717: 999 Years Commencing From 25 June 1861	
Robinson Road	Wellesley; 23 Robinson Road	2860	I.L. 4008; I.L. 4007	999 Years commencing from 25 June 1861	
Robinson Road	Jing Tai Garden Mansion; 27-27B Robinson Road	2860	I.L. 713	999 Years Commencing From 25 June 1861	
Robinson Road	Right Mansion; 29 Robinson Road	2860	I.L. 712	999 Years Commencing From 25 June 1861	
Robinson Road	Peace Tower; 30-32 Robinson Road	2854	I.L. 391	999 Years Commencing From 17 March 1855	
Robinson Road	31 Robinson Road	2860	I.L. 711	999 years commencing from 25 June 1861	
Robinson Road	Arts Building; 36-40 Robinson Road	2854	I.L. 390	999 Years Commencing From 17 March 1855	
Robinson Road	Ming Garden; 46-48 Robinson Road	2854	I.L. 716	999 Years Commencing From 17 March 1855	
Robinson Road	Seymour Place; 60 Robinson Road	2858	I.L. 587	999 Years Commencing From 25 June 1859	
Robinson Road	Po Yue Yuk Building; 61 Robinson Road	2860	I.L. 1253	999 Years Commencing From 25 June 1861	
Robinson Road	The Richmond; 62C Robinson Road	2858	I.L. 588	999 Years, Commercing from 25 June 1859	
Robinson Road	Ohel Leah Synagogue; 70 Robinson Road	2858	I.L. 589	999 Years, Commercing from 25 June 1859	
Robinson Road	Peaksville; 74 Robinson Road	2857	I.L. 8193	999 Years Commencing From 8 March 1858	
Robinson Road	80 Robinson Road	2858	I.L. 590	999 Years commencing from 25 June 1859	
Robinson Road	Excelsior Court; 83 Robinson Road	2860	I.L. 704 I.L. 1661	999 Years Commencing From 25 June 1861	
Robinson Road	Solon House; 88 Robinson Road	2861	I.L. 1216	999 Years Commencing From 25 June 1862	
Robinson Road	Lai Cheung House; 90-92 Robinson Road	2861	I.L. 1216	999 Years Commencing From 25 June 1862	
Robinson Road	94-96 Robinson Road	2861	I.L. 1216	999 Years Commencing From 25 June 1862	
Robinson Road	98-100 Robinson Road	2861	I.L. 1216	999 Years Commencing From 25 June 1862	
Robinson Road	First Mansion; 102-108 Robinson Road	2861	I.L. 1216	999 Years Commencing From 25 June 1862	
Sai Yuen Lane	Artisan House; 1 Sai Yuen Lane	2854	I.L. 3915 I.L. 3916 I.L. 3917 I.L. 3918 I.L. 3919 I.L. 3920 I.L. 3921 I.L. 3922 I.L. 3923	999 Years commencing from 1 October 1855	
Sands Street	Harbour View Garden 1 Sands Street 2 Catchick Street 21 North Street	2891	I.L. 1301	999 Years Commencing From 24 June 1892	
Sands Street	Shun On Building; 2 Sands Street	2872	M.L. 301	999 Years Commencing From 31 March 1873	
Sands Street	Ying Ga Garden; 34 Sands Street	2872	M.L. 239	999 Years Commencing From 31 March 1873	
Sands Street	Tai Pak Terrace; 36 Sands Street	2872	M.L. 239	999 Years Commencing From 31 March 1873	
Second Street	Yue Sun Mansion 68-80 Second Street 89-99 Third St	2859	I.L. 635 I.L. 634	999 Years Commencing From 26 December 1860	
Second Street	Altro; 116-118 Second Street	2860	I.L. 678	999 Years commencing from 25 May 1861	
Second Street	Yen Fook Mansion; 120-126 Second Street	2879	I.L. 816	999 Years Commencing From 13 February 1880	
Second Street	Hoi Sing Building; 128,143 Second Street	2879		999 Years Commencing From 13 February 1880	
Seymour Road	Fairview Height; 1 Seymour Road	2875/2884	I.L. 27 I.L. 4635 I.L. 4634 I.L. 4633	I.L. 27: 999 years commencing from 24 June 1876; I.L. 4633, 4634, 4635: 999 years commencing 5 January 1885	
Seymour Road	Goldwin Heights; 2 Seymour Road	2858	I.L. 588	999 Years Commencing From 25 June 1859	
Seymour Road	Azura; 2A Seymour Road	2857	I.L. 577	999 Years commencing from 1 May 1858	
Seymour Road	Palatial Crest; 3 Seymour Road	2884/2861	I.L. 4634 I.L. 4633 I.L. 4632 I.L. 4631 I.L. 4630	I.L. 4631 R.P., 4632 R.P., 4633 s.B, 4634 s.B: 999 years commencing from 5 January 1885; I.L. 4630 R.P.: 999 years commencing from 7 June 1862	
Seymour Road	The Legacy (Formerly Merry Terrace); 4A-4P Seymour Road	2857	I.L. 576	999 Years commencing from 1 May 1858	
Seymour Road	Hong Kong Garden; 8 Seymour Road	2857	I.L. 1409	999 Years Commencing From 8 March 1858	
Seymour Road	Seymour; 9 Seymour Road	2858	I.L. 585 I.L. 4626 I.L. 4627 I.L. 4628 I.L. 4629	999 years from 25 June 1859	
Seymour Road	Fortune Gardens; 11 Seymour Road	2854-2858	I.L. 585 I.L. 586 I.L. 4625 I.L. 4624 I.L. 4623 I.L. 4622 I.L. 4621 I.L. 503	IL 4621,4622,4623,4624,4625 & IL 586: 999 Years Commencing From 25 June 1859; IL 503: 999 Years Commencing From 16 November 1855	
Seymour Road	Arezzo; 33 Seymour Road	2854	I.L. 425; I.L. 424	999 Years commencing from 28 May 1855	
Seymour Road	Argenta; 63 Seymour Road	2856	I.L. 2300	IL 2300: 999 years from 1 September 1857	
Shelley Street	LL Tower; 2-4 Shelly Street	2843	I.L. 116	I.L. 116: 75 years extended to 999 years from 22 January 1844	
Shelley Street	Lilian Court; 8 Shelley Street	2843	I.L. 116	999 Years Commencing From 22 January 1844	
Shelley Street	Shelley Court; 23-25 Shelley Street	2854	I.L. 341	999 Years Commencing From 17 March 1855	
Shelley Street	Jamia Mosque; 30 Shelley Street	2848	I.L. 268	999 years commencing from 3 December 1849	
Shelley Street	Soho 38; 38 Shelley Street	2848	I.L. 344; I.L. 348	999 years commencing from 27 November 1849	
Smithfield	May Sun Building; 1-15 Smithfield	2891	M.L. 245	999 Years Commencing From 24 June 1892	
Smithfield	Markfield Building; 8 Smithfield	2891	M.L. 5266	999 Years Commencing From 24 June 1892	
Smithfield	Man Kwong Court; 12 Smithfield	2891	I.L. 954	999 Years Commencing From 24 June 1892	
Smithfield	Smithfield Court; 43 Smithfield	2882	I.L. 906	999 Years Commencing From 24 June 1883	
Smithfield	Luen Hing Apartments; 47 Smithfield	2882	I.L. 906	999 Years Commencing From 24 June 1883	
Smithfield	Luen On Apartments; 51 Smithfield	2882	I.L. 906	Inland Lot No 906: 999 years commencing from 24 June 1883	
South Lane	One South Lane; 1 South Lane	2890	I.L. 1300	999 years from 25 December 1891	
South Lane	Nam Wah Mansion; 5-9 South Lane	2890	I.L. 1300	999 years from 25 December 1891	
South Lane	Eight South Lane; 8-12 South Lane	2860	I.L. 676; I.L. 675	999 Years commencing From 25 June 1861	
South Lane	Green View Court; 16 South Lane	2860	I.L. 673 I.L. 674 I.L. 6125	999 Years commencing From 25 June 1861	
Stanley Street	Eurasia Building; 6 Stanley Street	2842	I.L. 18 I.L. 18A	IL 18, 18A: 999 years commencing from 26 June 1843	
Stanley Street	World Trust Tower; 50 Stanley Street	2842	I.L. 5091 I.L. 5092 I.L. 5093 I.L. 5094 I.L. 5095 I.L. 5096	999 years from 26 June 1843	
Staunton Street	Villa Serene 3 Staunton Street 10 Shelley Street	2843	I.L. 116	999 Years Commencing From 22 January 1844	
Staunton Street	Asiarich Court; 5 Staunton Street	2843	I.L. 116	999 Years Commencing From 22 January 1844	
Square Street	Rich View Terrace; 26 Square Street	2854	I.L. 275	999 Years Commencing From 16 March 1855	
Tai Ping Shan Street	Goodview Court; 1 Tai Ping Shan Street	2843/2844	I.L. 250 I.L. 290	IL 250: 999 Years Commencing From 31 August 1844; IL 290: 999 Years Commencing From 16 March 1855	
Tai Ping Shan Street	Tai Cheung House; 2-4 Tai Ping Shan Street	2896	I.L. 1434	999 Years Commencing From 1897	
Tai Ping Shan Street	5-5A Tai Ping Shan Street	2896	I.L. 224	999 Years Commencing From 1897	
Tai Ping Shan Street	Po Wan Building; 6 Tai Ping Shan Street	2896	I.L. 224	999 Years Commencing From 1897	
Tai Ping Shan Street	Tai On House; 14-14B Tai Ping Shan Street	2896	I.L. 1455	999 Years Commencing From 1897	
Tai Ping Shan Street	16-16A Tai Ping Shan Street	2896	I.L. 1455	999 Years Commencing From 1897	
Tai Ping Shan Street	Tai Ning House; 18-18A Tai Ping Shan Street	2896	I.L. 1455	999 Years Commencing From 1897	
Tai Ping Shan Street	Tai Yue Building; 20-20A Tai Ping Shan Street	2896	I.L. 1456	999 Years Commencing From 1897	
Tai Ping Shan Street	Tai Ping Building; 22-24 Tai Ping Shan Street	2896	I.L. 1456	999 Years Commencing From 1897	
Tai Ping Shan Street	Tai Hong Building; 26-30 Tai Ping Shan Street	2892	I.L. 1457	999 Years Commencing From 1893	
Tai Ping Shan Street	Tai Shan House; 32-34 Tai Ping Shan Street	2892	I.L. 1457	999 Years Commencing From 1897	
Tak Sing Lane	1-7 Tak Sing Lane		I.L. 635		
Third Street	Fung Yat Building; 38-40 Third Street	2860	I.L. 2972 I.L. 2971 I.L. 2969 I.L. 2970	999 Years Commencing From 25 June 1861	
Third Street	Comfort Court; 52 Third Street	2860	I.L. 684	999 Years Commencing From 25 June 1861	
Third Street	True Light Building; 100-106 Third Street	2860	I.L. 679	999 Years Commencing From 25 June 1861	
Third Street	Wing Sing Court; 178-180 Third Street	2861	I.L. 5812 I.L. 5813 I.L. 5814	999 Years Commencing From 30 June 1862	
To Li Terrace	To Li Garden; 11 To Li Terrace	2843	I.L. 2687	999 Years Commencing From 1873	
Tregunter Path	Tregunter; 14 Tregunter Path	2897	I.L. 1929 I.L. 1627 I.L. 8306 I.L. 1626	IL 1929: 75 years from 2 September 1912, renewable for 75 years IL 1626, 1627: 75 years from 4 February 1901, renewable for 75 years IL 8306: 999 years from 31 May 1898	
Tung Street	Tung Shing Building; 28-30 Tung Street	2843	I.L. 237	I.L. 237: 999 years commencing from 31 August 1844	
Tung Street	42 Tung Street	2843	I.L. 238A	I.L. 238A: 75 years commencing from 31 August 1844, extended by 924 years by a Deed of Extension dated 8 January 1919	
Upper Station Street	Elegance Court; 6-14 Upper Station Street	2843	I.L. 209	999 Years Commencing From 2 December 1844	
Victoria Road	Regent Height 80 Victoria Road 33 Sai Ning Street	2891	I.L. 8504	999 Years Commencing From 4 April 1892	
Water Street	Rockson Mansion; 25-35A Water St	2861	I.L. 5811 I.L. 5810 I.L. 5809 I.L. 5808 I.L. 5807 I.L. 5806	999 Years Commencing From 30 June 1862	
Wellington Street	Silver Fortune Plaza; 1 Wellington Street	2842	I.L. 80	999 years commencing on 26 June 1843	
Wellington Street	Wellington Place; 2-8 Wellington Street	2843	I.L. 4773 I.L. 4772 I.L. 4771 I.L. 4770 I.L. 4777 I.L. 4778 I.L. 4774 I.L. 4775	Inland Lots Nos. 4770, 4771, 4772, 4773, 4774, 4775, 4777 and 4778: 999 years commencing from 22 January 1844	
Wellington Street	Winway Building; 50 Wellington Street	2842	I.L. 999 I.L. 998	999 years commencing from 26 June 1843	
Wellington Street	59-61 Wellington Street	2842	I.L. 5088 I.L. 5089	999 years commencing from 26 June 1843	
Wellington Street	Welley Building; 97 Wellington Street	2843	I.L. 169	999 years commencing from 1844	
Wellington Street	DL Tower; 92 Wellington Street	2864	I.L. 419	999 years commencing from 1865	
Wellington Street	Jade Centre; 98 Wellington Street	2864	I.L. 419	999 years commencing from 1865	
Wellington Street	156-158 Wellington Street	2842	I.L. 5329 I.L. 5328	999 years commencing from 26 June 1843	
Western Street	Yuet Sum Mansion; 2-2E Western Street	2891	M.L. 95 I.L. 1311	999 Years Commencing From 27 July 1892	
Western Street	Fifteen Western St; 15 Western Street	2860	I.L. 747	The term of years shall be 999 years from 25 June 1861	
Western Street	30-32 Western Street	2859	I.L. 625	Inland Lot No. 625: 999 years commencing from 26 December 1860	
Western Street	King's Hill; 38 Western Street	2860	I.L. 694	999 Years Commencing From 25 June 1861	
Wilmer Street	Wai Wah Commercial Centre; 6 Wilmer Street	2854	M.L. 90 I.L. 5957 I.L. 5956	3 government leases for 999 years commencing from 4 August 1855	
Wing Kut Street	Wing Hang Insurance Building; 11 Wing Kut Street	2842	I.L. 5340 I.L. 5341 I.L. 5342 I.L. 5343 I.L. 5344	IL 5340, 5341, 5342, 5343, 5344: 999 years commencing from 26 June 1843	
Wing Lok Street	Charles L Corn Building; 26 Wing Lok Street	2865	M.L. 38	999 years from 26 December 1866	
Wing Lok Street	58 WLS; 58 Wing Lok Street		I.L. 1810; I.L. 1811		
Wing Lok Street	Wing Lok Mansion; 160-162 Wing Lok Street	2870	M.L. 232	999 years commencing from 25 June 1871	
Wing Lok Street	199 Wing Lok Street	2853	I.L. 870	999 years commencing from 27 September 1854	
Wing Lok Street	Kin Tye Lung Building; 191-193 Wing Lok Street	2853	I.L. 870	999 years commencing from 27 September 1854	
Wing Yu Building; 195-197 Wing Lok Street	2853	I.L. 1024	999 years commencing from 27 September 1854		
199 Wing Lok Street	2853	I.L. 1024	999 years commencing from 27 September 1854		
Wo Fung Street	One Pacific Heights; 1 Wo Fung Street	2842	M.L. 58	ML 58: 999 years commencing from 26 June 1843	
Woo Hop Street	Kam Ling Court 1-3 Woo Hop Street 532-534 Queen's Road West	2860	I.L. 674	999 Years Commencing From 25 June 1861	
Woo Hop Street	Kwok Ga Building; 6-12 Woo Hop Street	2860	I.L. 673 I.L. 674	999 Years Commencing From 25 June 1861	
Woodlands Terrace	Woodland Court; 2-3 Woodlands Terrace	2854	I.L. 5540 I.L. 5541	999 Years Commencing From 28 May 1855	
Woodlands Terrace	Woodland Terrace; 4 Woodlands Terrace	2854	I.L. 5542	999 Years Commencing From 28 May 1855	
Wyndham Street	South China Building; 1 Wyndham Street	2842	I.L. 80	999 years commencing from 26 June 1843	
Wyndham Street	LKF29; 29 Wyndham Street	2842	I.L. 1005	Inland Lot No. 1005: 999 years commencing on 26 June 1843	
Wyndham Street	Wyndham Mansion; 32 Wyndham Street	2842	I.L. 7642	999 Years Commencing From 26 June 1843	
Wyndham Street	Wyndham Place; 44 Wyndham Street	2843	I.L. 4076 I.L. 4096 I.L. 146	999 years commencing from 22 January 1844	
Wyndham Street	Winsome House; 73 Wyndham Street	2843	I.L. 7968 I.L. 5025 I.L. 994	Inland Lot Nos. 5025 and 994: 999 years commencing from 26 June 1843; Inland Lot No. 7968 is held under Conditions of Exchange No. 8224 for a term of 999 years commencing from 22 January 1844	
Ying Fai Terrace	Ying Fai Court; 1 Ying Fai Terrace	2858	I.L. 4620	999 Years Commencing From 10 October 1859	
Ying Fai Terrace	Bella Vista; 3 Ying Fai Terrace	2854	I.L. 4619 I.L. 4618 I.L. 4617	999 Years Commencing From 16 November 1855	
Ying Wa Terrace	Wah Fai Court; 1-6 Ying Wa Terrace	2860	I.L. 6495 I.L. 6496 I.L. 6497 I.L. 6498 I.L. 6499 I.L. 6500	999 Years Commencing From 25 June 1861	
Ying Wa Terrace	Ying Wa Court; 12 Ying Wa Terrace	2860	I.L. 6504 I.L. 6505 I.L. 6506	999 Years Commencing From 25 June 1861	

=== Wan Chai District ===
The following table lists properties in the Wan Chai District that have 999-year leases.

Table of Properties with 999-year leases in Wan Chai District
Street	Building	Lease Expiration	Primary Lots	Notes	Ref
Anton Street	Anton Building; 1 Anton Street	2862	M.L. 65	ML 65: 999 years commencing from 25 June 1863	
Blue Pool Road	Blue Pool Mansion; 1-3 Blue Pool Road	2896	I.L. 1460	999 years from 13 December 1897	
Blue Pool Road	The Ellipsis; 5 Blue Pool Road	2896	I.L. 1460	999 years from 13 December 1897	
Bowrington Road	Tai Ning Court; 18-20 Bowrington Road	2895	I.L. 1573	999 years commencing on 1896	
Bowrington Road	Po Wing Building; 26-28 Bowrington Road	2895	I.L. 1573	999 years commencing on 1896	
Brown Road	18-20 Brown Road	2893	T.H.L. 42	999 years commencing on 1894	
Burrows Street	Bel Trade Commercial Building; 1-3 Burrows Street	2858	M.L. 108 M.L. 109	999 years commencing on 11 October 1859	
Burrows Street	Ying Fat House; 2-4 Burrows Street	2858	I.L. 2239	999 years commencing on 11 October 1859	
Canal Road West	Top View Mansion; 10 Canal Road West	2860	I.L. 744; M.L. 270	999 years from 1861	
Canal Road West	Yue King Building 26-30 Canal Road West 1-7 Leighton Road 41-47 Morrison Hill Road	2891	I.L. 8923 I.L. 1294 I.L. 1365	I.L. 1294: 999 years from 22 February 1892 I.L. 1365: 999 years from 22 February 1892 I.L. 8923: 50 years from 29 August 1997	
Cannon Street	6 Cannon Street	2842	M.L. 52	999 years from 25 June 1843	
Causeway Road	Waldorf Mansion; 2-6A Causeway Road	2888	I.L. 1149	999 Years Commencing From 20 May 1889	
Causeway Road	Catic Plaza; 8 Causeway Road	2888	I.L. 1149	999 Years Commencing From 20 May 1889	
Causeway Road	Causeway Tower; 16-22 Causeway Road	2888	I.L. 1149	999 Years Commencing From 20 May 1889	
Chan Tong Lane	Chinese Muslim Cultural and Fraternal Association; 7 Chan Tong Lane	2892	I.L. 1339	999 years commencing from 13 November 1893	
Cleveland Street	Hamilton Mansion; 1-3 Cleveland Street	2868	M.L. 231	999 years commencing from 25 December 1869	
Cleveland Street	Cleveland Mansion; 5-7 Cleveland Street	2868	M.L. 231	999 years commencing from 25 December 1869	
Cleveland Street	Newtown Mansion; 6 Cleveland Street	2868	M.L. 231	999 years commencing from 25 December 1869	
Cleveland Street	Highland Mansion; 8 Cleveland Street	2868	M.L. 231	999 years commencing from 25 December 1869	
Cleveland Street	Florida Mansion; 9-11 Cleveland Street	2868	M.L. 231	999 years commencing from 25 December 1869	
Cleveland Street	Marco Polo Mansion; 10 Cleveland Street	2868	M.L. 231	999 years commencing from 25 December 1869	
Cleveland Street	Miami Mansion; 13-15 Cleveland Street	2868	M.L. 231	999 years commencing from 25 December 1869	
Cross Street	2-8 Cross Street	2854	I.L. 412	999 Years Commencing From 15 May 1855	
Cross Street	Wing Shing Building; 7 Cross Street	2884	I.L. 962	999 Years Commencing From 1885	
Cross Street	Galway Court; 9 Cross Street	2854	I.L. 3190	999 Years Commencing From 15 May 1855	
Cross Street	Fu Wing Court; 10-12 Cross Street	2854	I.L. 412	999 Years Commencing From 15 May 1855	
Cross Street	Silvervale Mansion; 18 Cross Street	2854	I.L. 4251 I.L. 4252 I.L. 4253 I.L. 4254 I.L. 4255 I.L. 4387	999 Years Commencing From 29 May 1855	
Cross Street	Coral Court; 26 Cross Street	2854	I.L. 4256	999 Years Commencing From 29 May 1855	
Cross Street	28 Cross Street	2854	I.L. 430	999 Years Commencing From 29 May 1855	
Cross Street	Kwong Har Building; 30-32 Cross Street	2854	I.L. 430	999 Years Commencing From 29 May 1855	
Cross Street	Valiant Court; 31-37 Cross Street	2854	I.L. 3204 I.L. 3205	999 Years Commencing From 29 May 1855	
Cross Street	Fook Cheung House; 34-38 Cross Street	2854	I.L. 430	999 Years Commencing From 29 May 1855	
Cross Street	40-42 Cross Street	2854	I.L. 430	999 Years Commencing From 29 May 1855	
East Point Road	Chee On Building 24 East Point Road	2842/2864	M.L. 52 I.L. 469 I.L. 470	Marine Lot No. 52: 999 years commencing from 25 June 1843 Inland Lot No. 469, Inland Lot No. 470: 999 years commencing from 24 December 1865	
East Point Road	Excelsior Plaza; 24/26 East Point Road	2842	M.L. 52	999 years commencing from 25 June 1843	
East Point Road	Yee On Building 26 East Point Road	2842	M.L. 52	999 years commencing from 25 June 1843	
Electric Road	95 Electric Road	2896	I.L. 4173	999 years commencing from 1897	
Electric Road	97-99 Electric Road	2896	I.L. 4174; I.L. 4175	999 years commencing from 1897	
Electric Road	101-103 Electric Road	2896	I.L. 4176; I.L. 4177	999 years commencing from 1897	
Electric Road	Wing Hing House; 107-109 Electric Road	2896	I.L. 1449	999 years commencing from 1897	
Electric Road	Po Tin Building; 111-117 Electric Road	2896	I.L. 1449	999 years commencing from 1897	
Electric Road	Hotel One Eighteen; 118 Electric Road	2886	I.L. 1059 I.L. 1060	999 years commencing from 14 February 1887	
Electric Road	Wing Wah Building; 122-128 Electric Road	2886	I.L. 1061 I.L. 1062 I.L. 1063 I.L. 1064	999 years commencing from 14 February 1887	
Electric Road	Tai Wah Building; 130-140 Electric Road	2886	I.L. 1065	999 years commencing from 14 February 1887	
Electric Road	Merlin Garden; 160 Electric Road	2895	I.L. 1367; I.L. 2273	IL 1367: 999 years commencing from 24 February 1896 IL 2273: 75 years and renewable for 75 years commencing from 25 August 1919	
Electric Road	AT Tower; 180 Electric Road	2895	I.L. 1367	999 years commencing from the 24 February 1896	
Electric Road	Swanhill Mansion; 198 Electric Road	2895	I.L. 1367	999 Years Commencing From 24 February 1896	
Foo Ming Street	Po Foo Building; 1-5 Foo Ming Street	2842	I.L. 29	982 years commencing from 24 June 1860	
Foo Ming Street	Po Ming Building; 2-6 Foo Ming Street	2842	I.L. 29	982 years commencing from 24 June 1860	
Gloucester Road	YF Life Centre; 38 Gloucester Road	2862	I.L. 3287; I.L. 6936	IL 3287: 999 years from 25 June 1863 IL 6936: 75 years renewable for further 75 years from 25 January 1954	
Gloucester Road	One Causeway Bay; 281 Gloucester Road	2842	M.L. 52	Formerly The Excelsior; 999 years from 25 June 1843	
Gloucester Road	Windsor House; 311 Gloucester Road	2864	I.L. 7717 I.L. 7718 I.L. 781 I.L. 782	999 years commencing from 24 December 1865	
Great George Street	Island Centre; 1 Great George Street	2864	I.L. 470	IL 470: 999 years commencing on 24 December 1865	
Haven Street	Lei Wen Court; 31-33A Haven Street	2885	I.L. 2147	999 Years Commencing From 30 June 1886	
Heard Street	Chin Hung Building; 1-15 Heard Street	2858	I.L. 2254	999 Years Commencing From 11 October 1859	
Hennessy Road	28 Hennessy Road	2843	M.L. 23 I.L. 2244 I.L. 2245	ML 23, IL 2244, IL 2245: 999 years commencing from 9 July 1844	
Hennessy Road	Tak Wah Mansion; 290-296 Hennessy Road	2858	M.L. 113	999 Years Commencing From 11 October 1859	
Hennessy Road	Kwong Sang Hong Building 298 Hennessy Road 6 Heard Street 188 Wan Chai Road	2858	M.L. 113; M.L. 114	999 Years Commencing From 11 October 1859	
Hennessy Road	W Square; 314-324 Hennessy Road	2859	M.L. 122	999 years from 26 December 1860	
Hennessy Road	CNT Tower; 338 Hennessy Road	2859	M.L. 123; M.L. 124	999 years commencing on 26 December 1860	
Hennessy Road	Kuo Wah Building; 340-342 Hennessy Road	2859	M.L. 124	999 years commencing on 26 December 1860	
Hennessy Road	Cheong Ip Building; 344-354A Hennessy Road	2860	M.L. 197	999 years commencing on 1861	
Hennessy Road	Kai Ming Building; 364-366 Hennessy Road	2860	I.L. 5047; I.L. 5048	I.L. 5047 and I.L. 5048: 999 years commencing on 1861	
Hennessy Road	Yan Wo Yuet Building; 432-436 Hennessy Road	2860	M.L. 269	999 years commencing on 1861	
Hennessy Road	Thai Kong Building; 482 Hennessy Road	2861	I.L. 3582	999 years commencing from 25 June 1862	
Hennessy Road	Goldmark; 502 Hennessy Road	2842	I.L. 8584; I.L. 81	Inland Lot No. 8584: 75 years renewable for further 75 years commencing from 21 December 1984 Section Q of Inland Lot No. 81: 999 years commencing from 26 June 1843	
Hennessy Road	Wellable Commercial Building; 513 Hennessy Road	2842	M.L. 52	999 years from 25 June 1843	
Hennessy Road	519-521 Hennessy Road	2842	M.L. 52	999 years from 25 June 1843	
Hennessy Road	Macau Yat Yuen Centre; 523-527 Hennessy Road	2842	M.L. 52	999 years from 25 June 1843	
Hennessy Road	East Point Centre; 555 Hennessy Road	2842/2864	I.L. 8816 M.L. 52 I.L. 470 I.L. 8583	Inland Lot No. 8583: 75 years renewable for a further term of 75 years commencing on 17 May 1984 Inland Lot No. 470: 999 years commencing on 24 December 1865 Marine Lot No. 52 and the Extension thereto: 999 years commencing on 25 June 1843 Inland Lot No. 8816: commencing on 1 March 1993 until 30 June 2047	
Hysan Avenue	One Hysan Avenue; 1 Hysan Avenue	2842	I.L. 29	982 years commencing from 24 June 1860	
Hysan Avenue	Empire Court; 2-4 Hysan Avenue	2842	I.L. 29	982 years commencing from 24 June 1860	
Hysan Avenue	Eton Tower; 8 Hysan Avenue	2842	I.L. 29	982 years commencing from 24 June 1860	
Hysan Avenue	Lee Garden One; 33 Hysan Avenue	2842/2864	I.L. 29; I.L. 457	IL 457: 999 years commencing from 24 December 1865 IL 29: 982 years commencing from 24 June 1860	
Jaffe Road	Malahon Apartments Causeway Bay Ginza Red Mall 501-515 Jaffe Road	2842	I.L. 2836; M.L. 52	Remaining Portion of Section D of Inland Lot No. 2836: 99 years from 30 September 1929 renewable for a further term of 99 years Remaining Portion of Section L of Marine Lot No. 52 and the Extension thereto: 999 years commencing on 25 June 1843	
Jaffe Road	518-520 Jaffe Road	2842	M.L. 52	999 years from 25 June 1843	
Jaffe Road	522-524 Jaffe Road	2842	M.L. 52	999 years commencing from 25 June 1843	
Jardine's Bazaar	Jardine Center; 50 Jardine's Bazaar	2849/2850	I.L. 7390 I.L. 7930 I.L. 7929 I.L. 7356	Inland Lot No. 7390: 999 years commencing from 25 June 1851; Inland Lot Nos. 7930, 7929 and 7356: 999 years commencing from 23 December 1850	
Jardine's Crescent	Lee Fat Building; 30-36 Jardine's Crescent	2842	I.L. 81	999 Years Commencing From 26 June 1843	
Johnston Road	Man Hee Mansion 2-12A Johnston Road 21 Li Chit Street 4 Landale Street	2843	M.L. 25 M.L. 413	999 Years Commencing From 9 July 1844	
Johnston Road	York Place; 22 Johnston Road	2848	M.L. 296	999 years commencing from 5 October 1849	
Johnston Road	Luen Fat Mansion; 36-42 Johnston Road	2843	M.L. 31 M.L. 36	999 Years Commencing From 9 July 1844	
Johnston Road	44-46 Johnston Road	2844	M.L. 36	999 Years Commencing From 26 June 1845	
Johnston Road	48-50 Johnston Road	2844	M.L. 36	999 Years Commencing From 26 June 1845	
Johnston Road	Chiu Hin Mansion; 94-102 Johnston Road	2842	I.L. 7812 I.L. 7813 I.L. 7814 I.L. 7815 I.L. 7816	979 years commencing from 1863	
Johnston Road	112 Johnston Road	2858	I.L. 6563 I.L. 6564 I.L. 6565	999 years commencing from 1859	
Johnston Road	CNT House; 120 Johnston Road	2854	M.L. 116	999 Years Commencing From 15 May 1855	
Johnston Road	Chi Residences 138; 138 Johnston Road	2854	M.L. 117	999 Years Commencing From 15 May 1855	
Johnston Road	Sing Tak Building; 144-146 Johnston Road	2854	M.L. 118	999 Years Commencing From 15 May 1855	
Johnston Road	Chung Nam Mansion; 148-158 Johnston Road	2854	M.L. 118	999 Years Commencing From 15 May 1855	
Johnston Road	Mei Wah Building; 164-176 Johnston Road	2854	M.L. 119	The Remaining Portion of Marine Lot No 119: 999 years commencing from 15 May 1855	
Johnston Road	Toi Shan Association Building; 167-169 Johnston Road	2854	M.L. 107	999 years commencing from 11 October 1859	
Johnston Road	Chinachem Johnston Plaza; 178-186 Johnston Road	2854	M.L. 107	999 years commencing from 11 October 1859	
Johnston Road	Chuen Fung Building; 188-192 Johnston Road	2858	M.L. 107 M.L. 108	999 years commencing from 11 October 1859	
Johnston Road	Wanchai Commercial Centre; 194-204 Johnston Road	2858	M.L. 108	999 years commencing from 11 October 1859	
Johnston Road	208 Johnston; 206-212 Johnston Road	2858	M.L. 108 M.L. 109	999 Years Commencing From 11 October 1859	
Johnston Road	Yuk Chun House; 218-220 Johnston Road	2858	M.L. 110	999 Years Commencing From 11 October 1859	
Johnston Road	Fu Kar Building 222-230 Johnston Road 1A-1C Mallory Street	2858	M.L. 110	999 Years Commencing From 11 October 1859	
Jupiter Street	Corn Yan Centre; 3 Jupiter Street	2895	I.L. 1366	999 Years Commencing From 24 February 1896	
Jupiter Street	Jupiter Tower; 8 Jupiter Street	2895	I.L. 1366	999 Years Commencing From 24 February 1896	
Jupiter Street	The Consonance; 23 Jupiter Street	2895	I.L. 1366	999 Years Commencing From 24 February 1896	
Kat On Street	Newtown Mansion; 1-5 Kat On Street	2883	I.L. 785	999 years commencing from 1884	
Kat On Street	2-2A Kat On Street	2861	I.L. 786 I.L. 787	999 years commencing from 1862	
Kat On Street	4-4A Kat On Street	2861	I.L. 787	999 years commencing from 1862	
Kat On Street	11 Kat On Street	2861	I.L. 784	999 years commencing from 1862	
Kat On Street	13-15 Kat On Street	2861	I.L. 784	999 years commencing from 1862	
Kennedy Street	Brilliant Court; 8 Kennedy Street	2885/2892	I.L. 965; I.L. 1331	999 years commencing on 8 March 1886 and on 1 May 1893	
Kennedy Street	Hong Fook Building 11-11A Kennedy Street 15 Lung On Street		I.L. 1094		
Kennedy Street	Kin On Building; 16-20 Kennedy Street	2883	I.L. 950	999 Years Commencing From 1 December 1884	
Kennedy Street	Kenny Court; 22-28 Kennedy Street	2890	I.L. 1246	999 Years Commencing From 9 March 1891	
King's Road	Kailey Court; 67-71 King's Road	2895	I.L. 1366	999 Years Commencing From 24 February 1896	
King's Road	Kung On Mansion; 85 King's Road	2895	I.L. 1366	999 Years Commencing From 24 February 1896	
Kingston Street	Kingston Building; 2-4 Kingston Street	2858	M.L. 231	999 years commencing from 25 December 1869	
Kingston Street	Vancouver Building; 6 Kingston Street	2858	M.L. 231	999 years commencing from 25 December 1869	
Kingston Street	Greenfield Building; 8 Kingston Street	2868	M.L. 231	999 years commencing from 25 December 1869	
Kingston Street	Clarke Mansion; 9 Kingston Street	2868	M.L. 231	999 years commencing from 25 December 1869	
Kingston Street	Chesterfield Mansion; 11 Kingston Street	2868	M.L. 231	999 years commencing from 25 December 1869	
Kingston Street	Victoria Park Mansion; 15 Kingston Street	2868	M.L. 231	999 years commencing from 25 December 1869	
Landale Street	Rialto Building; 2 Landale Street	2843	I.L. 2246	999 Years Commencing From 9 July 1844	
Lee Garden Road	Happy Mansion; 13-19 Lee Garden Road	2842	I.L. 29	982 years commencing from 24 June 1860	
Leighton Road	Honest Motors Building; 9-11 Leighton Road		I.L. 5432; I.L. 5431		
Leighton Road	Bonaventure House; 91 Leighton Road	2842	I.L. 29	982 years commencing from 24 June 1860	
Leighton Road	China Congregational Church; 119 Leighton Road	2883	I.L. 955	999 years commencing on 25 December 1884	
Leighton Road	Haven Court 128-138 Leighton Road 2-30 Haven Street	2885	I.L. 2147	999 Years Commencing From 30 June 1886	
Lockhart Road	512 Lockhart Road	2842	M.L. 52	ML 52: 999 years commencing from 25 June 1843	
Lockhart Road	514 Lockhart Road	2842	M.L. 52	ML 52: 999 years commencing from 25 June 1843	
Lockhart Road	516 Lockhart Road	2842	M.L. 52	ML 52: 999 years commencing from 25 June 1843	
Lockhart Road	518 Lockhart Road	2842	M.L. 52	ML 52: 999 years commencing from 25 June 1843	
Lockhart Road	520 Lockhart Road	2842	M.L. 52	ML 52: 999 years commencing from 25 June 1843	
Lockhart Road	522 Lockhart Road	2842	M.L. 52	ML 52: 999 years commencing from 25 June 1843	
Lockhart Road	524 Lockhart Road	2842	M.L. 52	ML 52: 999 years commencing from 25 June 1843	
Matheson Street	Times Square; 1 Matheson Street	2850-2880	I.L. 727 I.L. 728 I.L. 725 I.L. 724 I.L. 722 I.L. 731 I.L. 718	Inland Lot Nos 722, 724, 725 and 728: 999 years commencing from 25 June 1861 Inland Lot Nos 727 and 731: 999 years commencing from 20 June 1881 Inland Lot No 718: 999 years commencing from 25 June 1851	
Matheson Street	11-13 Matheson Street	2880	I.L. 730	IL 730 sQ sR: 999 years commencing from 1 September 1881	
Matheson Street	15 Matheson Street	2880	I.L. 730	999 years commencing from 1 September 1881	
Mcgregor Street	Cactus Mansion; 1-19 Mcgregor Street	2854	I.L. 5666 I.L. 5667 I.L. 5668 I.L. 5703 I.L. 5704 I.L. 5705 I.L. 5706 I.L. 5707 I.L. 5708 I.L. 5709	999 Years Commencing From 15 July 1855	
Mercury Street	Sup Tower 4 Mercury Street 75-83 King's Road	2895	I.L. 1366	999 years commencing from 24 February 1896	
Mercury Street	Hoi Hing Building; 5-7 Mercury Street	2895	I.L. 1366	999 years commencing from 24 February 1896	
Mercury Street	Hang Po Building; 6-8 Mercury Street	2895	I.L. 1366	999 years commencing from 24 February 1896	
Mercury Street	Kui Lee Building; 9-11 Mercury Street	2895	I.L. 1366	999 years commencing from 24 February 1896	
Mercury Street	Hoi Sun Building; 12 Mercury Street	2895	I.L. 1366	999 Years Commencing From 24 February 1896	
Mercury Street	Eco Tree Causeway Bay; 15 Mercury Street	2895	I.L. 1366	999 Years Commencing From 24 February 1896	
Mercury Street	San Ho Building; 17-19 Mercury Street	2895	I.L. 1366	999 Years Commencing From 24 February 1896	
Mercury Street	Vincent Mansion; 18-20 Mercury Street	2895	I.L. 1366	999 Years Commencing From 24 February 1896	
Mercury Street	The Mercury; 23 Mercury Street	2895	I.L. 1366	999 Years Commencing From 24 February 1896	
Mercury Street	Supernova Stand; 28 Mercury Street	2895	I.L. 1366	999 years commencing from 24 February 1896	
Moreton Terrace	Bay View Mansion; 11-33 Moreton Terrace	2888	I.L. 1149	999 years from 20 May 1889	
Morrison Hill Road	Tak Fung House; 1-3 Morrison Hill Road	2892	I.L. 1339	999 years commencing from 13 November 1893	
Morrison Hill Road	EIB Tower; 4-6 Morrison Hill Road	2842	I.L. 2765	999 Years commencing from 1843	
Morrison Hill Road	Morrison Plaza; 9 Morrison Hill Road	2892	I.L. 1339; I.L. 3988	IL 1339 R.P., S.B: 999 years commencing from 13 November 1893 IL 3988: 999 years commencing from 18 December 1893	
Morrison Hill Road	11 Morrison Hill Road	2892	I.L. 3983; I.L. 3984	The Remaining Portion of Inland Lot Nos. 3983 and 3984 for a lease term of 999 years commencing from 18 December 1893	
Morrison Hill Road	Lai Shan Mansion; 19-21 Morrison Hill Road; 1 Sharp Street West	2892	I.L. 1342; I.L. 3987	999 years commencing from 18 December 1893	
Morrison Hill Road	Yan Shing Mansion; 29 Morrison Hill Road	2891	I.L. 1313	999 years from 22 February 1892	
Morrison Hill Road	Morrison Commercial Building; 31 Morrison Hill Road	2897	I.L. 1313	999 years from 1898	
Morrison Hill Road	Mandarin Commercial House; 38 Morrison Hill Road	2842	I.L. 8440	Conditions of Exchange No. 11043: 999 years commencing from 26 December 1843	
Morrison Hill Road	Ormsby Street	19-21 Ormsby Street	2893	T.H.L. 23	999 years commencing from 1894
Paterson Street	Pearl City Mansion; 22-36 Paterson Street	2868	M.L. 231	999 years commencing from 25 December 1869	
Paterson Street	Paterson Building; 37-47 Paterson Street	2868	I.L. 469	999 years commencing from 25 June 1843	
Paterson Street	Causeway Bay Mansion; 42-48 Paterson Street	2868	M.L. 231	999 years commencing from 25 December 1869	
Paterson Street	Towning Mansion; 50-56 Paterson Street	2868	M.L. 231	999 years commencing from 25 December 1869	
Paterson Street	Fairview Mansion; 51 Paterson Street	2868	M.L. 52	999 years commencing from 25 June 1843	
Paterson Street	Hyde Park Mansion; 53 Paterson Street	2868	M.L. 52	999 years commencing from 25 June 1843	
Paterson Street	Vienna Mansion; 55 Paterson Street	2842	M.L. 52	999 years commencing from 25 June 1843	
Paterson Street	Haywood Mansion; 57 Paterson Street	2842	M.L. 52	999 years commencing from 25 June 1843	
Paterson Street	Welcome Mansion; 58-64 Paterson Street	2868	M.L. 231	999 years commencing from 25 December 1869	
Paterson Street	Riviera Mansion; 59-65 Paterson Street	2842	M.L. 231	999 years commencing from 25 June 1843	
Paterson Street	Prospect Mansion; 66-72 Paterson Street	2868	M.L. 231	999 years commencing from 25 December 1869	
Pennington Street	Dragon Rise; 9-11 Pennington Street; 61-63 Jardine's Bazaar	2864	I.L. 461	999 Years Commencing From 24 December 1865	
Pennington Street	Guangdong Tours Centre; 18 Pennington Street	2883	I.L. 955	999 years commencing on 25 December 1884	
Queen's Road East	Three Pacific Place; 1 Queen's Road East	2050-2852	I.L. 47A I.L. 47B I.L. 47C I.L. 47D I.L. 47	IL 47: 999 years from 24 June 1853 IL 47A: 999 years from 17 May 1850 IL 47B: 999 years from 24 June 1853 IL 47C: 999 years from 24 June 1853 IL 47D: 999 years from 24 June 1853	
Queen's Road East	Tung Hey Building; 14-20 Queen's Road East	2862	M.L. 65	999 Years Commencing From 25 June 1863	
Queen's Road East	Tesbury Centre; 28 Queen's Road East	2862	M.L. 65	ML 65: 999 years from 25 June 1863	
Queen's Road East	Lok Moon Mansion; 29-31 Queen's Road East	2956/2959	I.L. 3960 I.L. 3961 I.L. 222 I.L. 3962 I.L. 3963 I.L. 3967 I.L. 3868 I.L. 3969 I.L. 3965 I.L. 3966 I.L. 526	999 years from 1 September 1857 and 26 December 1860 for those sections of Inland Lot No. 526 and those sections of all other lots (other than Inland Lot No. 526) respectively	
Queen's Road East	Kar Yau Building; 34-38 Queen's Road East	2862	M.L. 65	999 Years Commencing From 25 June 1863	
Queen's Road East	Queen's Centre; 58-64 Queen's Road East	2943	I.L. 2243	999 years from 9 July 1844	
Queen's Road East	Tai Tung House; 67-73 Queen's Road East	2872	I.L. 199	999 years commencing from 1873	
Queen's Road East	Portwealth Centre; 83 Queen's Road East	2872	I.L. 199	999 years commencing from 1873	
Queen's Road East	Kam Tak Mansion; 88-90 Queen's Road East	2848	I.L. 1798	999 years commencing from 5 October 1849	
Queen's Road East	Yan King Court; 119-121 Queen's Road East	2846	I.L. 7757; I.L. 7758	999 years commencing from 1847	
Queen's Road East	Ming Yan Mansion; 146-152 Queen's Road East	2862	I.L. 4662 I.L. 4663 I.L. 4664 I.L. 4665	999 Years Commencing From 25 June 1863	
Queen's Road East	153-167 Queen's Road East	2843/2874	I.L. 5251 I.L. 5252 I.L. 5253 I.L. 5256 I.L. 5257 I.L. 5657 I.L. 5658 I.L. 7975	IL 5251, 5252, 5253, 5256RP, 5257RP: 999 years from 9 July 1844 IL 7975: 999 years from 9 July 1844 IL 5657 & Ext. and 5658: 999 years from 25 December 1875	
Queen's Road East	GardenEast; 222 Queen's Road East	2854	I.L. 427	999 years from 29 July 1855	
Queen's Road East	Shui Cheung Building; 223-229A Queen's Road East	2859	I.L. 652	999 years commencing on 1860	
Queen's Road East	Jonsim Place; 228 Queen's Road East	2854	I.L. 427	999 years from 29 July 1855	
Queen's Road East	Lon Kie Mansion; 238 Queen's Road East	2854	I.L. 5661 I.L. 5662	999 years from 29 July 1855	
Queen's Road East	Dah Sing Financial Centre; 248 Queen's Road East	2854	I.L. 387; I.L. 506	Inland Lot No. 506: 999 years commencing from 16 November 1855 Inland Lot No. 387: 999 years commencing from 16 March 1855	
Queen's Road East	Methodist International Church; 271 Queen's Road East	2891	I.L. 1316	999 years commencing from 25 December 1892	
Russell Street	Emperor Watch and Jewellery Centre; 8 Russell Street	2860	I.L. 746	999 years commencing from 25 June 1861	
Russell Street	Lai Yuen Building; 59-61 Russell Street	2842	I.L. 29	982 years commencing from 24 June 1860	
Sam Pan Street	Fortune Eagle Mansion; 21 Sam Pan Street	2842	I.L. 427	999 Years Commencing From 29 July 1855	
San Wui Road	Capital Building; 6-10 San Wui Road	2842	I.L. 29	982 years commencing from 24 June 1860	
Shan Kwong Road	Happy Valley Jewish Cemetery; 13 Shan Kwong Road	2857	I.L. 8519; I.L. 581	999 years commencing from 23 June 1858	
Shelter Street	Mayland Court; 1-7 Shelter Street	2888	I.L. 1149	999 Years Commencing From 20 May 1889	
Shelter Street	Rosedale; 8 Shelter Street	2888	I.L. 1149	999 years commencing on 20 May 1889	
Shelter Street	Parkview Commercial Building; 9-11 Shelter Street	2888	I.L. 1149	999 Years Commencing From 20 May 1889	
Shelter Street	Vansun Building; 11A-15 Shelter Street	2888	I.L. 1149	999 Years Commencing From 20 May 1889	
Shelter Street	Wah Ying Building; 14-20 Shelter Street	2888	I.L. 1149	999 Years Commencing From 20 May 1889	
Shelter Street	17-17A Shelter Street	2888	I.L. 1149	999 Years Commencing From 20 May 1889	
Spring Garden Lane	Chun Fai Building; 1-11 Spring Garden Lane	2842	I.L. 7817 I.L. 7818 I.L. 7819 I.L. 7820 I.L. 7821 I.L. 7822	982 years commencing from 24 June 1860	
Spring Garden Lane	Wing Hing Building; 6-12 Spring Garden Lane	2854	I.L. 6891 I.L. 6892 I.L. 6893 I.L. 6894	999 Years Commencing From 29 July 1855	
Spring Garden Lane	14-16 Spring Garden Lane	2854	I.L. 6890 I.L. 6889	999 Years Commencing From 29 July 1855	
Spring Garden Lane	18-20 Spring Garden Lane	2854	I.L. 412	999 Years Commencing From 29 July 1855	
Spring Garden Lane	Spring Garden Mansion; 29-41 Spring Garden Lane	2842	I.L. 7831 I.L. 7832 I.L. 7833 I.L. 7834 I.L. 7835 I.L. 7836 I.L. 7837	982 years commencing from 24 June 1860	
Spring Garden Lane	Spring Garden; 38 Spring Garden Lane	2854	I.L. 427	999 Years Commencing From 29 July 1855	
Spring Garden Lane	New Spring Garden Mansion; 47-65 Spring Garden Lane	2842	I.L. 7840 I.L. 7841 I.L. 7842 I.L. 7843 I.L. 7844 I.L. 7845 I.L. 7846 I.L. 7847 I.L. 7848 I.L. 7849	982 years commencing from 24 June 1860	
Ship Street	Pao Yip Building; 1-7 Ship Street	2844	M.L. 36	999 Years Commencing From 26 June 1845	
Ship Street	Pinnacle Building; 9 Ship Street	2844	M.L. 36	999 Years Commencing From 26 June 1845	
Ship Street	33-35 Ship Street	2849	I.L. 6466 I.L. 6467	999 Years Commencing From 1850	
Sugar Street	Causeway Bay Commercial Building; 1-5 Sugar Street	2864	I.L. 781	999 years commencing from 24 December 1865	
Sun Chun Street	1 Sun Chun Street 2 Sun Chun Street 3 Sun Chun Street 4 Sun Chun Street 5 Sun Chun Street 9-10 Sun Chun Street 11 Sun Chun Street 12 Sun Chun Street 13-14 Sun Chun Street 14A Sun Chun Street 14B Sun Chun Street 15 Sun Chun Street 15A Sun Chun Street 16 Sun Chun Street 16A Sun Chun Street 16B Sun Chun Street 17-25 Sun Chun Street 29 Sun Chun Street 30 Sun Chun Street 31 Sun Chun Street 35-36 Sun Chun Street 37 Sun Chun Street 38 Sun Chun Street 39 Sun Chun Street 40 Sun Chun Street 42-43 Sun Chun Street 51 Sun Chun Street 52 Sun Chun Street 53-54 Sun Chun Street 55 Sun Chun Street 56-58 Sun Chun Street	2893	T.H.L. 1 T.H.L. 2 T.H.L. 3 T.H.L. 4 T.H.L. 5 T.H.L. 6 T.H.L. 7 T.H.L. 8 T.H.L. 9 T.H.L. 10 T.H.L. 11 T.H.L. 12 T.H.L. 13 T.H.L. 14 T.H.L. 15 T.H.L. 16 T.H.L. 17 T.H.L. 19 T.H.L. 20 T.H.L. 21 T.H.L. 22 T.H.L. 23 T.H.L. 24 T.H.L. 25 T.H.L. 26 T.H.L. 27 T.H.L. 28 T.H.L. 29 T.H.L. 30 T.H.L. 31 T.H.L. 34 T.H.L. 35 T.H.L. 36 T.H.L. 37 T.H.L. 38 T.H.L. 39 T.H.L. 40 T.H.L. 41 T.H.L. 43 T.H.L. 44 T.H.L. 45 T.H.L. 46 T.H.L. 47 T.H.L. 48 T.H.L. 166 T.H.L. 167 T.H.L. 169 T.H.L. 170 T.H.L. 171 T.H.L. 172	999 Years Commencing From 20 May 1894	
Sun Street	Yuk Yat Building; 2-4 Sun Street	2896	I.L. 1450	999 years from 13 December 1897	
St. Francis Street	St. Francis Mansion; 4-6 St. Francis Street	2842	I.L. 199	982 years commencing from 24 June 1860	
Star Street	Moonstar Court; 2-12 Star Street	2896	I.L. 1525	999 years from 13 December 1897	
Star Street	Eight Star Street; 8 Star Street	2856	I.L. 526	999 years from 1 September 1857	
Stone Nullah Lane	Luckifast Building; 1-13 Stone Nullah Lane	2854	M.L. 116 I.L. 4262 I.L. 4263 I.L. 4264	999 Years Commencing From 15 May 1855	
Stone Nullah Lane	Wui Fu Building; 10-12 Stone Nullah Lane	2854	I.L. 431	999 Years Commencing From 15 May 1855	
Stone Nullah Lane	Kam Shing Building; 14-24 Stone Nullah Lane	2854	I.L. 430 I.L. 431	999 Years Commencing From 29 May 1855	
Stone Nullah Lane	Wing Kee Mansion; 23-25 Stone Nullah Lane	2854	I.L. 4257 I.L. 4258	999 Years Commencing From 15 May 1855	
Stone Nullah Lane	Tai Tak Building; 82A-B Stone Nullah Lane	2861	I.L. 783	999 Years Commencing From 1862	
Stone Nullah Lane	Kin On House; 84-86 Stone Nullah Lane	2861	I.L. 788	999 Years Commencing From 1862	
Sunning Road	Lee Garden Three; 1 Sunning Road	2842	I.L. 29	982 years commencing from 24 June 1860	
Swatow Street	Mountain View Mansion; 2-4 Swatow Street	2842	I.L. 4297 I.L. 4298 I.L. 4300 I.L. 4301 I.L. 4331 I.L. 4332 I.L. 4333	979 years commencing from 1863	
Swatow Street	Yen May Building; 11-21 Swatow Street	2842	I.L. 4287 I.L. 4288 I.L. 4289 I.L. 4290 I.L. 4291	979 years commencing from 1863	
Swatow Street	Yee Hor Mansion; 22-24 Swatow Street	2842	I.L. 4306 I.L. 4307 I.L. 4308 I.L. 4309 I.L. 4310	979 years commencing from 1863	
Tai Wo Street	Lodgewood Wan Chai; 28 Tai Wo Street	2854	M.L. 117	999 Years Commencing From 15 May 1855	
Tai Wong Street East	Antung Building; 6-16 Tai Wong Street East	2854	M.L. 64A	999 Years Commencing From 15 May 1855	
Tai Wong Street East	Wealthy Mansion 7-11 Tai Wong Street East 7-11 Tai Wong Street West	2862	I.L. 4670 I.L. 4671 I.L. 4672 I.L. 4673	999 Years Commencing From 25 June 1863	
Tai Wong Street East	Hing Wong Court; 21 Tai Wong Street East	2862	I.L. 4678; I.L. 4679	999 Years Commencing From 25 June 1863	
Tai Wong Street East	Shu Tak Building; 22-30 Tai Wong Street East	2854	M.L. 64	999 Years Commencing From 15 May 1855	
Tai Yuen Street	Yanville; 8 Tai Yuen Street	2854	M.L. 116 I.L. 4266 I.L. 4267 I.L. 4268	ML 116: 999 Years Commencing From 15 May 1855; IL 4266-4268: 999 Years Commencing From 29 May 1855	
Tai Yuen Street	Avery House; 22 Tai Yuen Street	2854	I.L. 4272 I.L. 4248 I.L. 4249 I.L. 4250	999 Years Commencing From 29 May 1855	
Tai Yuen Street	Tai Yuen Court; 38 Tai Yuen Street	2854	I.L. 3196 I.L. 388 I.L. 3197 I.L. 508	IL 3196: 999 years commencing on 16 March 1855 IL 388: 999 years commencing on 16 March 1855 IL 3197: 999 years commencing on 16 March 1855 IL 508: 999 years commencing on 16 November 1855	
Tang Lung Street	Giok San Building; 31-35 Tang Lung Street	2861	M.L. 201 M.L. 202	999 years commencing from 25 June 1862	
Tang Lung Street	Tang Fai Building; 36-48 Tang Lung Street	2861	M.L. 202A I.L. 3604 I.L. 3605 I.L. 3606	999 years commencing from 25 June 1862	
Tin Lok Lane	Kiu Hong Mansion; 3-5A Tin Lok Lane	2854	M.L. 283 I.L. 6574 I.L. 6575	999 Years from Commencing From 1855	
Tin Lok Lane	Diamond Building; 6-18 Tin Lok Lane	2860	I.L. 5054 I.L. 5055 I.L. 5056 I.L. 5057 I.L. 5058 I.L. 5059	IL 5054-5059: 999 Years Commencing From 1861	
Tin Lok Lane	Siu Fung Building; 9-17 Tin Lok Lane	2854	I.L. 6577 I.L. 6578 I.L. 6579 I.L. 6580	999 Years from Commencing From 1855	
Triangle Street	Wah Yan Court; 2-3 Triangle Street	2854	I.L. 417	999 Years Commencing From 15 May 1855	
Tung Lo Wan Road	Cathay Mansion; 3-17 Tung Lo Wan Road	2888	I.L. 1149	999 Years Commencing From 20 May 1889	
Tung Lo Wan Road	Regent Heights; 17 Tung Lo Wan Road	2888	I.L. 1149	999 Years Commencing From 20 May 1889	
Ventris Road	Ventris; 20 Ventris Road	2897	I.L. 7988	999 Years Commencing From 1898	
Ventris Road	22-22A Ventris Road	2897	I.L. 1690	999 Years Commencing From 1898	
Wan Chai Road	Fu Yuen; 39-49 Wan Chai Road	2846-2850	I.L. 357; I.L. 300	IL 300: 999 Years Commencing From 26 April 1847 IL 357: 999 Years Commencing From 25 June 1851	
Wan Chai Road	Wanchai House; 40-54 Wan Chai Road	2854	I.L. 432	999 Years Commencing From 1855	
Wan Chai Road	56-60 Wan Chai Road	2854	I.L. 1515	999 Years Commencing From 1855	
Wan Chai Road	Fully Building 62-76 Wan Chai Road 10-18 Triangle St	2854	M.L. 119	999 Years Commencing From 15 May 1855	
Wan Chai Road	L'Wanchai; 109 Wan Chai Road	2854-2859	I.L. 434 I.L. 435 I.L. 658 I.L. 659	IL 434,435: 999 Years commencing from 13 September 1855; IL 658,659: 999 Years commencing from 1 August 1860	
Wan Chai Road	Tak Lee Commercial Building; 113 Wan Chai Road	2854	I.L. 8186 I.L. 8187 I.L. 8300	999 Years commencing on 1855	
Wan Chai Road	121-123C Wan Chai Road	2854	I.L. 437	999 years commencing on 1855	
Wan Chai Road	Cathay Lodge; 125 Wan Chai Road	2858	I.L. 611; I.L. 662	999 years commencing on 11 October 1859 and 26 December 1860	
Wan Chai Road	Ming Fung Building; 128-150 Wan Chai Road	2858	M.L. 108 M.L. 109	999 years commencing on 11 October 1859	
Wan Chai Road	Times Media Centre; 133 Wan Chai Road	2858	I.L. 612; I.L. 663	IL 612,663: 999 Years commencing on 11 October 1859	
Wan Chai Road	Lucky House; 149 Wan Chai Road	2880	I.L. 622 I.L. 665	999 Years commencing on 1881	
Wan Chai Road	Namhoy Building; 152-158 Wan Chai Road	2858	I.L. 2241	999 Years commencing on 11 October 1859	
Wan Chai Road	Pao Woo Mansion 177-179 Wan Chai Road 51 Cross Lane	2854/2858	I.L. 438 I.L. 443 I.L. 616	Inland Lot Nos. 438 and 443: 999 years from 9 July 1855; Inland Lot No. 616: 999 years from 11 October 1859	
Wan Chai Road	Cheung Chun Building; 181A-181G Wan Chai Road; 6-10A Wood Road	2859	I.L. 445	Inland Lot No. 445: 999 years from 26 December 1860	
Wan Chai Road	King Sing Mansion; 187 Wan Chai Road	2842	I.L. 7329	999 Years commencing from 1843	
Wan Chai Road	Yee Hong Building; 212-214 Wan Chai Road	2859	M.L. 121	999 years commencing on 26 December 1860	
Wan Chai Road	Lee Cheong Building; 218-220B Wan Chai Road	2859	M.L. 122	999 years commencing on 26 December 1860	
Wan Chai Road	Plaza 228; 222-228 Wan Chai Road	2859	M.L. 123	999 years commencing on 26 December 1860	
Wan Chai Road	Great Smart Tower; 230-230A Wan Chai Road	2859	M.L. 124	999 years commencing from 26 December 1860	
Wan Chai Road	One Continental; 232 Wan Chai Road	2859	M.L. 124	999 years commencing from 26 December 1860	
Wan Chai Road	Hung Yip Building; 234-236 Wan Chai Road	2860	M.L. 197	999 years commencing from 1861	
Wing Fung Street	1 Wing Fung Street	2859	I.L. 3964	999 years from 26 December 1860	
Wing Fung Street	STAR STUDIOS I; 8-10 Wing Fung Street	2056/2852	I.L. 47; I.L. 8464	IL 47 sF (part), IL 47 sG (part), IL 47 sH (part), IL 47 sI (part): 999 years from 24 June 1853	
Wing Fung Street	STAR STUDIOS II; 18 Wing Fung Street	2056/2852	I.L. 47; I.L. 8464	IL 47 sF (part), IL 47 sG (part), IL 47 sH (part), IL 47 sI (part): 999 years from 24 June 1853	
Wing Fung Street	21-29 Wing Fung Street	2856	I.L. 526	999 years from 1 September 1857	
Wong Nai Chung Road	St. Michael's Catholic Cemetery; Wong Nai Chung Road	2847	I.L. 299	999 years commencing from 7 January 1848	
Wong Nai Chung Road	Happy Mansion; 39-41 Wong Nai Chung Road	2896	I.L. 1460	999 years from 13 December 1897	
Wong Nai Chung Road	Arts Mansion; 43 Wong Nai Chung Road	2896	I.L. 1460	999 Years Commencing From 13 December 1897	
Wong Nai Chung Road	Green Valley Mansion; 51 Wong Nai Chung Road	2896	I.L. 1460	999 Years Commencing From 13 December 1897	
Wong Nai Chung Road	Splendour Court; 53 Wong Nai Chung Road	2896	I.L. 1460	999 Years Commencing From 13 December 1897	
Wong Nai Chung Road	Green View Mansion; 55-57 Wong Nai Chung Road	2896	I.L. 1460	999 Years Commencing From 13 December 1897	
Wong Nai Chung Road	Comfort Mansion; 59-61 Wong Nai Chung Road	2896	I.L. 1460	999 Years Commencing From 13 December 1897	
Wong Nai Chung Road	Bonny View House; 63-65 Wong Nai Chung Road	2896	I.L. 1460	999 Years Commencing From 13 December 1897	
Wong Nai Chung Road	Champion Court; 67-69 Wong Nai Chung Road	2896	I.L. 1460	999 Years Commencing From 13 December 1897	
Wong Nai Chung Road	Broadview Mansion; 73-75B Wong Nai Chung Road	2896	I.L. 1460; I.L. 1690	999 Years Commencing From 13 December 1897	
Wong Nai Chung Road	77-79 Wong Nai Chung Road	2897	I.L. 1484	999 Years Commencing From 1898	
Wood Road	One Wood Road; 1 Wood Road	2859	I.L. 668	999 years commencing from 26 December 1860	
Wood Road	Wood Road House; 3-5 Wood Road	2859	I.L. 668	999 years commencing from 26 December 1860	
Wood Road	woodis; 15 Wood Road	2859	I.L. 444 I.L. 446	999 years commencing from 26 December 1860	
Wood Road	The Oakhill; 16-28 Wood Road	2893	I.L. 1337	I.L. 1337: 999 years commencing from 1 January 1894	
Wun Sha Street	Kam Chung House; 26-28 Wun Sha Street	2893	T.H.L. 5; T.H.L. 9	999 years commencing from 1894	
Wun Sha Street	30 Wun Sha Street	2893	T.H.L. 1	999 years commencing from 1894	
Yee Wo Street	Lok Sing Centre; 19-31 Yee Wo Street	2864	I.L. 8347	999 years commencing from 24 December 1865	
Yee Wo Street	68 Yee Wo Street	2883	I.L. 1408	Inland Lot No. 1408: 999 years commencing from 25 December 1884	
Yee Wo Street	Regal Hongkong Hotel; 88 Yee Wo Street	2883	I.L. 1408	Inland Lot No. 1408: 999 years commencing from 25 December 1884	
Yiu Wa Street	14 Yiu Wa Street	2880		Discrepancy: reference (Star Properties Group) says IL 5434: 999 years from 1 September 1881; Street Index says I.L. 730, also 999 years commencing from 1 September 1881	
Yiu Wa Street	16 Yiu Wa Street	2880	I.L. 730	IL 730: 999 years from 1 September 1881	
Yun Ping Road	Lee Garden Two; 28 Yun Ping Road	2847/2864	I.L. 29 I.L. 457 I.L. 461	IL 457, 461: 999 years commencing from 24 December 1865; IL 29: 982 years commencing from 25 June 1860	
Yun Ping Road	Fortune Centre; 44-48 Yun Ping Road	2842	I.L. 29; I.L. 457	IL 457: 999 years commencing from 24 December 1865 IL 29: 982 years commencing from 25 June 1860	
Yun Ping Road	50 Yun Ping Road	2842/2864	I.L. 29; I.L. 457	Inland Lot No 29: 982 years from 25 June 1860 Inland Lot No. 457: 999 years from 24 December 1865	

=== Eastern District ===
The following table lists properties in the Eastern District that have 999-year leases.

Table of Properties with 999-year leases in Eastern District
Street	Building	Lease Expiration	Primary Lots	Notes	Ref
(Multiple streets)	Cityplaza (South and North)	2899		999 years from 18 April 1900	
(Multiple streets)	Cityplaza - Commercial areas in Taikoo Shing (Stages I-X) Stages I (Tsui Woo Terrace), II (Kao Shan Terrace), III (Kao Shan Terrace), IV (Kam Din Terrace), V (On Shing Terrace), VI, VII, VIII, IXA (Harbour View Gardens), IXB (Kwun Hoi Terrace), X (Sing Fai Terrace), XI (Horizon Garden)	2081/2899		The leases for the lots comprising the Commercial areas in Stages I-X of Taikoo Shing will expire in 2081 or 2899. Shaukiwan Marine Lot No. 1: 999 years from 5 August 1890. Shaukiwan Marine Lot No. 2: 75 years from 27 April 1931 which renewed for a further term of 75 years. Quarry Bay Marine Lot No. 2 and the Extension: 999 years from 18 April 1900.	
A Kung Ngam Village Road	A Kung Ngam Village	2893	A.K.N.L. 3-32	999 years from 1894	
A Kung Ngam Village Road	HKSH Eastern Medical Centre (Tsao Yin Kai Block); 3 A Kung Ngam Village Road	2893	S.I.L. 826	999 years from 1894	
Braemar Hill Road	Braemar Hill Mansions; 15-43 Braemar Hill Road	2892	I.L. 8398	999 years from 11 July 1893	
Braemar Hill Road	Braemar Hill Shopping Centre; 45 Braemar Hill Road	2892	I.L. 8398	999 years from 11 July 1893	
Factory Street	Shaukiwan Centre; 7-9 Factory Street	2859	S.L. 104	999 years commencing from 3 January 1860	
Fook Yum Road	Nam Fung Court Harbour Heights 1 Fook Yum Road	2895	M.L. 277 M.L. 281 I.L. 1395	M.L. 277 & Ext. thereto and I.L. 1395: 999 years from 24 February 1896; M.L. 281 & Ext. thereto: 75 years from 31 August 1903 renewable for a further term of 75 years	
Fook Yum Road	Sung Fung Court Harbour Heights 3 Fook Yum Road	2895	M.L. 277 M.L. 281 I.L. 1395	Three Government Leases for a term of 999 years commencing from 24 February 1896; One Government Leases for a term of 75 years renewable for 75 years commencing from 31 August 1978	
Fook Yum Road	Ko Fung Court Harbour Heights 5 Fook Yum Road	2895	M.L. 277 M.L. 281 I.L. 1395	M.L. 277 & Ext. thereto and I.L. 1395: 999 years from 24 February 1896; M.L. 281 & Ext. thereto: 75 years from 31 August 1903 renewable for a further term of 75 years	
Fook Yum Road	Community Centre Harbour Heights 7 Fook Yum Road	2895	M.L. 277 M.L. 281 I.L. 1395	M.L. 277 & Ext. thereto and I.L. 1395: 999 years from 24 February 1896; M.L. 281 & Ext. thereto: 75 years from 31 August 1903 renewable for a further term of 75 years	
Finnie Street	Kiu Ying Building; 2D-H Finnie Street	2881	M.L. 703	999 years from 2 February 1882	
Healthy Street East	Kodak House II; 39 Healthy Street East	2868	M.L. 705	999 years commencing from 25 December 1869	
Hoi Kwong Street	Tor Po Mansion; 2-24 Hoi Kwong Street	2881	M.L. 703	999 Years Commencing From 2 February 1882	
Hoi Kwong Street	Hon Way Mansion; 11 Hoi Kwong Street	2881	M.L. 703	999 Years Commencing From 2 February 1882	
Hoi Kwong Street	Hoi Kwong Court 13-15 Hoi Kwong Street 9-15 Tong Chong Street	2881	M.L. 703	999 years from 2 February 1882	
Hoi Kwong Street	Tai Fung Building; 26-36 Hoi Kwong Street	2881	M.L. 703	999 years from 2 February 1882	
Hoi Tai Street	Dragon View House; 6-16 Hoi Tai Street	2881	M.L. 703	999 years from 2 February 1882	
Hoi Wan Street	Chinachem Exchange Square; 1 Hoi Wan Street	2881	M.L. 703	999 years from 2 February 1882	
Hoi Wan Street	Riviera Mansion; 2-2A Hoi Wan Street	2881	M.L. 703	999 years from 2 February 1882	
Hoi Wan Street	Ka Wing Building; 4-6 Hoi Wan Street	2881	M.L. 703	999 years from 2 February 1882	
Hoi Wan Street	Hoi Wan Building; 9-29 Hoi Wan Street	2881	M.L. 703	999 years from 2 February 1882	
Hoi Yu Street	Open Space; Hoi Yu Street	2881	I.L. 8590	999 years from 2 February 1882	
Java Road	321 Java Road (Kodak House 1); 321 Java Road	2868	M.L. 705	999 years from 25 December 1869	
Kam Ping Street	Kam Ming Yuen; 7-15 Kam Ping Street	2882	I.L. 1706	999 Years Commencing From 8 October 1883	
Kam Ping Street	Ming Yuen Station Building; Kam Ping Street	2882	I.L. 1706	999 Years Commencing From 8 October 1883	
Kam Ping Street	Tung Fat Building; 21-61 Kam Ping Street	2882	I.L. 1706	999 Years Commencing From 8 October 1883	
Kam Ping Street	Fortuna Building; 24-38 Kam Ping Street	2882	I.L. 1705	999 Years Commencing From 8 October 1883	
Kam Ping Street	Hung Fuk Building; 40-78 Kam Ping Street	2882	I.L. 1706	999 Years Commencing From 8 October 1883	
Kam Ping Street	Kam Ping Mansion; 63-69 Kam Ping Street	2882	I.L. 1706	999 Years Commencing From 8 October 1883	
Kam Ping Street	Pak Fuk Building; 80-118 Kam Ping Street	2882	I.L. 1705	999 Years Commencing From 8 October 1883	
King's Road	Carson Mansion 113-123 King's Road 170A-174B Electric Road	2895	I.L. 2273 I.L. 1367	IL 1367: 999 Years Commencing From 24 February 1896; IL 2273: 75 Years + 75 Years Renewal Commencing From 25 August 1919	
King's Road	Ming Yuen Centre; 402-404 King's Road	2882	I.L. 897	999 Years Commencing From 8 October 1883	
King's Road	Everwin Building; 406-408 King's Road	2896	I.L. 897	999 Years Commencing From 8 October 1883	
King's Road	Metropole Building; 416-438 King's Road	2882	I.L. 1705	999 Years Commencing From 8 October 1883	
King's Road	Maylun Apartment; 442-456 King's Road	2882	I.L. 897	999 Years Commencing From 8 October 1883	
King's Road	Mansion Building; 842-850A King's Road	2893	Q.B.I.L. 4	999 Years commencing from 2 July 1894	
King's Road	Novum East; 856 King's Road	2893	Q.B.I.L. 4	999 Years commencing from 2 July 1894	
King's Road	Lido Apartment; 860-878 King's Road	2893	Q.B.I.L. 4	999 Years commencing from 2 July 1894	
King's Road	CASA 880; 880 King's Road	2893	Q.B.I.L. 4	999 Years commencing from 2 July 1894	
King's Road	King's House; 969-971 King's Road	2881	M.L. 703	999 years from 2 February 1882	
King's Road	TaiKoo Place Cornwall House 979 King's Road	2881		999 years from 2 February 1882	
King's Road	TaiKoo Place Somerset House 979 King's Road	2881	Q.B.M.L. 1	999 years from 2 February 1882	
King's Road	TaiKoo Place Warwick House 979 King's Road	2881	Q.B.M.L. 1	999 years from 2 February 1882	
King's Road	TaiKoo Place Cambridge House 979 King's Road	2881	Q.B.M.L. 1	999 years from 2 February 1882	
King's Road	TaiKoo Place Devon House 979 King's Road	2881	M.L. 703 Q.B.M.L 1	999 years from 2 February 1882	
King's Road	TaiKoo Place Dorset House 979 King's Road	2881	Q.B.M.L. 1	999 years from 2 February 1882	
King's Road	TaiKoo Place Lincoln House 979 King's Road	2881	Q.B.M.L. 1	999 years from 2 February 1882	
King's Road	TaiKoo Place Oxford House 979 King's Road	2881/2899	Q.B.M.L. 1 Q.B.M.L. 2	QBIL 1: 999 years from 2 February 1882; QBIL 2: 999 years from 18 April 1900	
King's Road	TaiKoo Place PCCW Tower 979 King's Road	2881	Q.B.M.L. 1	999 years from 2 February 1882	
King's Road	Chung Hing Mansion; 981A-F King's Road	2881	Q.B.M.L. 1	999 years from 2 February 1882	
King's Road	Swiss House; 983-987A King's Road	2881	Q.B.M.L. 1	999 years from 2 February 1882	
King's Road	Sunway Gardens; 989-991A King's Road	2881	Q.B.M.L. 1	999 years from 2 February 1882	
King's Road	Tak Lee Building; 993 King's Road	2881	Q.B.M.L. 1	999 years from 2 February 1882	
King's Road	Poo Lee Building; 995 King's Road	2881	Q.B.M.L. 1	Quarry Bay Marine Lot No. 1: 999 years commencing on 2 February 1882	
King's Road	Wai Lee Building; 997 King's Road	2881	Q.B.M.L. 1	Quarry Bay Marine Lot No. 1: 999 years commencing on 2 February 1882	
King's Road	Westlands Gardens 1025-1037 King's Road 2-12 Westlands Road	2881	Q.B.I.L. 15	999 years from 2 February 1882	
King's Road	1063 King's Road	2881/2899	Q.B.I.L. 15 Q.B.M.L 2	Sub-Section 3 of Section C of Quarry Bay Inland Lot 15: 999 years from 2 February 1882; Sub-Section 5 of Section E of Quarry Bay Marine Lot 2 and The Extension Thereto: 999 years from 18 April 1900	
King's Road	Eastern Centre; 1065 King's Road	2881/2899	Q.B.I.L. 15 Q.B.M.L 2	Sub-Section 1 of Section E of Quarry Bay Marine Lot No. 2 and the Extension thereto: 999 years commencing from 18 April 1900; Sub-Section 1 of Section C of Quarry Bay Inland Lot No. 15: 999 years commencing from 2 February 1882	
King's Road	Zung Fu Industrial Building; 1067 King's Road	2899	Q.B.M.L 2	999 years commencing from 18 April 1900	
King's Road	Cityplaza One; 1111 King's Road	2899	Q.B.M.L 2	999 years from 18 April 1900	
Ming Yuen Western Street	Nan Chu Mansion; 7-9 Ming Yuen Western Street	2882	I.L. 897	999 Years Commencing From 8 October 1883	
Ming Yuen Western Street	8-8A Ming Yuen Western Street	2882	I.L. 897	999 Years Commencing From 8 October 1883	
Ming Yuen Western Street	10 Ming Yuen Western Street	2882	I.L. 897	999 Years Commencing From 8 October 1883	
Ming Yuen Western Street	11-11A Ming Yuen Western Street	2882	I.L. 897	999 Years Commencing From 8 October 1883	
Ming Yuen Western Street	12 Ming Yuen Western Street	2882	I.L. 897	999 Years Commencing From 8 October 1883	
Ming Yuen Western Street	14 Ming Yuen Western Street	2882	I.L. 897	999 Years Commencing From 8 October 1883	
Ming Yuen Western Street	15 Ming Yuen Western Street	2882	I.L. 897	999 Years Commencing From 8 October 1883	
Ming Yuen Western Street	17 Ming Yuen Western Street	2882	I.L. 897	999 Years Commencing From 8 October 1883	
Ming Yuen Western Street	Villa Claire; 18 Ming Yuen Western Street	2882	I.L. 897	999 Years Commencing From 8 October 1883	
Ming Yuen Western Street	Ming Court; 19-23 Ming Yuen Western Street	2882	I.L. 897	999 Years Commencing From 8 October 1883	
Ming Yuen Western Street	25 Ming Yuen Western Street	2882	I.L. 897	999 Years Commencing From 8 October 1883	
Ming Yuen Western Street	27 Ming Yuen Western Street	2882	I.L. 897	999 Years Commencing From 8 October 1883	
Ming Yuen Western Street	Mount East; 28 Ming Yuen Western Street	2882	I.L. 897	999 Years Commencing From 8 October 1883	
Ming Yuen Western Street	29 Ming Yuen Western Street	2882	I.L. 897	999 Years Commencing From 8 October 1883	
Ming Yuen Western Street	31 Ming Yuen Western Street	2882	I.L. 897	999 Years Commencing From 8 October 1883	
Ming Yuen Western Street	33 Ming Yuen Western Street	2882	I.L. 897	999 Years Commencing From 8 October 1883	
Ming Yuen Western Street	34 Ming Yuen Western Street	2882	I.L. 897	999 Years Commencing From 8 October 1883	
Ming Yuen Western Street	35 Ming Yuen Western Street	2882	I.L. 897	999 Years Commencing From 8 October 1883	
Ming Yuen Western Street	Kashi Court; 36 Ming Yuen Western Street	2882	I.L. 897	999 Years Commencing From 8 October 1883	
Ming Yuen Western Street	37 Ming Yuen Western Street	2882	I.L. 897	999 Years Commencing From 8 October 1883	
Ming Yuen Western Street	Lime Habitat; 38 Ming Yuen Western Street	2882	I.L. 897	999 Years Commencing From 8 October 1883	
Ming Yuen Western Street	39 Ming Yuen Western Street	2882	I.L. 897	999 Years Commencing From 8 October 1883	
Ming Yuen Western Street	41 Ming Yuen Western Street	2882	I.L. 897	999 Years Commencing From 8 October 1883	
Ming Yuen Western Street	43 Ming Yuen Western Street	2882	I.L. 897	999 Years Commencing From 8 October 1883	
Ming Yuen Western Street	45 Ming Yuen Western Street	2882	I.L. 897	999 Years Commencing From 8 October 1883	
Ming Yuen Western Street	47-49 Ming Yuen Western Street	2882	I.L. 897	999 Years Commencing From 8 October 1883	
Miu Tung Street	Pak Ning Mansion; 5-11 Miu Tung Street	2859	S.L. 52	999 Years Commencing From 3 January 1860	
Nam On Street	Hop Wing Building; 75 Nam On Street	2859	S.L. 128	999 Years Commencing From 3 January 1860	
Nam On Street	Nam On Court; 95 Nam On Street	2859	S.L. 132	999 Years Commencing From 3 January 1860	
Nam On Street	Hing Yip Building; 99 Nam On Street	2859	S.L. 132 S.L. 133	999 Years Commencing From 3 January 1860	
Pan Hoi Street	Kam Hoi Mansion; 15-53A Pan Hoi Street	2881	Q.B.M.L. 1	999 years from 2 February 1882	
Peacock Road	Ming Yuen Mansions Phase 1; 1-31 Peacock Road	2882	I.L. 7928 I.L. 1705	999 Years Commencing From 8 October 1883	
Peacock Road	Ming Yuen Mansions Phase 3; 18 Peacock Road	2882	I.L. 1705	999 Years Commencing From 8 October 1883	
Peacock Road	Ming Yuen Mansions Phase 2 26-72 Peacock Road 120-122 Kam Ping Street	2882	I.L. 1705	999 Years Commencing From 8 October 1883	
Quarry Bay Street	Tai Chow House; 121 Quarry Bay Street	2881	Q.B.I.L. 8	999 Years Commencing From 1882	
Quarry Bay Street	Tai Sing House; 122 Quarry Bay Street	2881	Q.B.I.L. 8	999 Years Commencing From 1882	
Quarry Bay Street	Tai Lung House; 123 Quarry Bay Street	2881	Q.B.I.L. 8	999 Years Commencing From 1882	
Quarry Bay Street	Tai Hing House; 124 Quarry Bay Street	2881	Q.B.I.L. 8	999 Years Commencing From 1882	
Sai Wan Ho Street	Grand Garden; 8 Sai Wan Ho Street	2859	S.L. 3; S.L. 4; S.L. 5	999 Years Commencing From 3 January 1860	
Sai Wan Ho Street	Kam Hoi Mansion; 14-20 Sai Wan Ho Street	2859	S.L. 2	999 Years Commencing From 3 January 1860	
Sai Wan Ho Street	Mei Tung Building; 17-19 Sai Wan Ho Street	2859	S.I.L. 619	999 Years Commencing From 3 January 1860	
Sai Wan Ho Street	Fu Yan Court; 23 Sai Wan Ho Street	2859	S.I.L. 619 S.I.L. 657 S.I.L. 656	SIL 619 S.E: 999 Years Commencing From 3 January 1860 SIL 657: 999 Years Commencing From 4 June 1860 SIL 656: 999 Years Commencing From 25 June 1860	
Shau Kei Wan Road	Dollar Building; 143-145 Shau Kei Wan Road	2859	S.I.L. 442	999 Years Commencing From 16 January 1860	
Shau Kei Wan Road	Fok Sing Building; 234-238 Shau Kei Wan Road	2859	S.L. 3	999 Years Commencing From 16 January 1860	
Shau Kei Wan Road	Man Hong Apartments; 241-249 Shau Kei Wan Road	2859	S.I.L. 133 S.I.L. 134	999 Years Commencing From 16 January 1860	
Shau Kei Wan Road	Scenic Horizon; 250 Shau Kei Wan Road	2859	S.L. 4; S.L. 5	999 Years Commencing From 16 January 1860	
Shau Kei Wan Road	Metro Mansion; 251-261 Shau Kei Wan Road	2859	S.L. 132; S.L. 133	999 Years Commencing From 16 January 1860	
Shau Kei Wan Road	Win Tack Building; 274-278 Shau Kei Wan Road	2859	S.I.L. 8 S.I.L. 9 S.I.L. 7	999 Years Commencing From 3 January 1860	
Shau Kei Wan Road	Ka Fook Building; 289-293 Shau Kei Wan Road	2859	S.L. 128	999 Years Commencing From 3 January 1860	
Shau Kei Wan Road	Lime Gala; 393 Shau Kei Wan Road	2859	S.L. 104	999 Years commencing from 3 January 1860	
Shau Kei Wan Main Street East	Tung Po Mansion; 4-10 Shau Kei Wan Main Street East	2875	S.L. 144; S.L. 145; S.L. 146	999 Years Commencing From 24 June 1876	
Shau Kei Wan Main Street East	Kim Fat Mansion; 11 Shau Kei Wan Main Street East	2875	S.L. 147	999 Years Commencing From 24 June 1876	
Shau Kei Wan Main Street East	Tung Wong House; 14-22 Shau Kei Wan Main Street East	2859	S.I.L. 754; S.I.L. 749	999 Years Commencing From 24 June 1876	
Shau Kei Wan Main Street East	On Lok Building; 15 Shau Kei Wan Main Street East	2859	S.L. 58	999 Years Commencing From 24 June 1876	
Shau Kei Wan Main Street East	Le Riviera; 23 Shau Kei Wan Main Street East	2859	S.L. 54 S.L. 152 S.L. 151 S.L. 150	999 Years commencing from 3 January 1860	
Shau Kei Wan Main Street East	Tung Hing Building; 28-40A Shau Kei Wan Main Street East	2859	S.I.L. 768	999 Years commencing from 3 January 1860	
Shau Kei Wan Main Street East	Tung Shing Building; 31-33 Shau Kei Wan Main Street East	2859	S.L. 52; S.L. 53; S.L. 154; S.L. 155	999 Years Commencing From 24 June 1876	
Shau Kei Wan Main Street East	The Eastborne; 41-51 Shau Kei Wan Main Street East	2859	S.L. 52	SL 52 S.F SS.1 R.P.: 999 Years Commencing From 3 January 1860; SL 52 S.D R.P.: 999 Years Commencing From 3 January 1860 LESS LAST 10 DAYS THEREOF	
Shau Kei Wan Main Street East	Golden Mansion; 42-52 Shau Kei Wan Main Street East	2859	S.L. 60; S.L. 61	999 Years Commencing From 3 January 1860	
Shau Kei Wan Main Street East	Eastway Towers; 59-99 Shau Kei Wan Main Street East	2859	S.I.L. 775 S.L. 42	999 Years Commencing From 3 January 1860	
Shau Kei Wan Main Street East	Tai On Court; 62-74 Shau Kei Wan Main Street East	2859	S.L. 63 S.L. 64	999 Years Commencing From 3 January 1860	
Shau Kei Wan Main Street East	Kwong Shun Building; 76 Shau Kei Wan Main Street East	2859	S.I.L. 767	999 Years Commencing From 3 January 1860	
Shau Kei Wan Main Street East	King Fai Building; 98-112 Shau Kei Wan Main Street East	2859	S.I.L. 770	999 Years Commencing From 3 January 1860	
Shau Kei Wan Main Street East	Tung Tai Building; 118-124 Shau Kei Wan Main Street East	2859	S.I.L. 758	999 Years Commencing From 3 January 1860	
Shau Kei Wan Main Street East	Tung Hong Building; 139 Shau Kei Wan Main Street East	2859	S.I.L. 701	999 Years Commencing From 3 January 1860	
Shau Kei Wan Main Street East	Kam Hey Mansion; 141-151 Shau Kei Wan Main Street East	2859	S.I.L. 776	999 Years Commencing From 3 January 1860	
Shipyard Lane	Wah Ha Industrial Building; 8 Shipyard Lane	2899	Q.B.M.L. 2	999 years from 18 April 1900	
Shipyard Lane	Cheung Wah Industrial Building; 10-12 Shipyard Lane	2899	Q.B.M.L. 2	999 years from 18 April 1900	
Tai Fung Avenue	Sing Fai Terrace Ngan Sing Mansion 1 Tai Fung Avenue	2889	Q.B.M.L. 2	999 years from 18 April 1900	
Tai Fung Avenue	Sing Fai Terrace Kam Sing Mansion 3 Tai Fung Avenue	2889	Q.B.M.L. 2	999 years from 18 April 1900	
Tai Fung Avenue	Kao Shan Terrace Kam Shan Mansion 5 Tai Fung Avenue	2889	Q.B.M.L. 2	999 years from 18 April 1900	
Tai Fung Avenue	Kao Shan Terrace Yee Shan Mansion 7 Tai Fung Avenue	2889	Q.B.M.L. 2	999 years from 18 April 1900	
Tai Wing Avenue	Sing Fai Terrace Tien Sing Mansion 1 Tai Wing Avenue	2889	Q.B.M.L. 2	999 years from 18 April 1900	
Tai Wing Avenue	Sing Fai Terrace Hang Sing Mansion 3 Tai Wing Avenue	2889	Q.B.M.L. 2	999 years from 18 April 1900	
Taikoo Shing Road	Kao Shan Terrace Po Shan Mansion 1 Taikoo Shing Road	2889	Q.B.M.L. 2	999 years from 18 April 1900	
Taikoo Shing Road	Kao Shan Terrace Nan Shan Mansion 3 Taikoo Shing Road	2889/2899	S.M.L. 1; Q.B.M.L. 2	SML 1: 999 years commencing on 5 August 1890 QBML 2: 999 years from 18 April 1900	
Taikoo Shing Road	Kao Shan Terrace Lu Shan Mansion 5 Taikoo Shing Road	2889/2899	S.M.L. 1; Q.B.M.L. 2	SML 1: 999 years commencing on 5 August 1890 QBML 2: 999 years from 18 April 1900	
Taikoo Shing Road	Kao Shan Terrace Tai Shan Mansion 7 Taikoo Shing Road	2889/2899	S.M.L. 1; Q.B.M.L. 2	SML 1: 999 years commencing on 5 August 1890 QBML 2: 999 years from 18 April 1900	
Taikoo Shing Road	Kao Shan Terrace Tien Shan Mansion 9 Taikoo Shing Road	2889/2899	S.M.L. 1; Q.B.M.L. 2	SML 1: 999 years commencing on 5 August 1890 QBML 2: 999 years from 18 April 1900	
Taikoo Shing Road	Sing Fai Terrace Hoi Sing Mansion 10 Taikoo Shing Road	2889	Q.B.M.L. 2	999 years from 18 April 1900	
Taikoo Shing Road	Kao Shan Terrace Tung Shan Mansion 11 Taikoo Shing Road	2889/2899	S.M.L. 1; Q.B.M.L. 2	SML 1: 999 years commencing on 5 August 1890 QBML 2: 999 years from 18 April 1900	
Taikoo Shing Road	Sing Fai Terrace Wai Sing Mansion 12 Taikoo Shing Road	2889	Q.B.M.L. 2	999 years from 18 April 1900	
Taikoo Shing Road	Sing Fai Terrace Yiu Sing Mansion 14 Taikoo Shing Road	2889	Q.B.M.L. 2	999 years from 18 April 1900	
Taikoo Shing Road	Kao Shan Terrace Carpark & Podium 15 Taikoo Shing Road	2889/2899	S.M.L. 1; Q.B.M.L. 2	SML 1: 999 years commencing on 5 August 1890 QBML 2: 999 years from 18 April 1900	
Taikoo Shing Road	Sing Fai Terrace Chi Sing Mansion 16 Taikoo Shing Road	2889	Q.B.M.L. 2	999 years from 18 April 1900	
Taikoo Shing Road	Kao Shan Terrace Wah Shan Mansion 17 Taikoo Shing Road	2889	Q.B.M.L. 2	999 years from 18 April 1900	
Taikoo Shing Road	Cityplaza; 18 Taikoo Shing Road	2889	Q.B.M.L. 2	999 years from 18 April 1900	
Taikoo Shing Road	Kao Shan Terrace Heng Shan Mansion 19 Taikoo Shing Road	2889	Q.B.M.L. 2	999 years from 18 April 1900	
Taikoo Shing Road	Kao Shan Terrace Loong Shan Mansion 21 Taikoo Shing Road	2889	Q.B.M.L. 2	999 years from 18 April 1900	
Taikoo Shing Road	Kao Shan Terrace Foong Shan Mansion 23 Taikoo Shing Road	2889	Q.B.M.L. 2	999 years from 18 April 1900	
Taikoo Shing Road	Kao Shan Terrace Fu Shan Mansion 25 Taikoo Shing Road	2889	Q.B.M.L. 2	999 years from 18 April 1900	
Taikoo Shing Road	Cityplaza; EAST Hong Kong; 29 Taikoo Shing Road	2899	Q.B.M.L. 2	999 years from 18 April 1900	
Taikoo Shing Road	Taikoo Station Building; 33 Taikoo Shing Road	2899	Q.B.M.L. 2	999 years from 18 April 1900	
Taikoo Shing Road	Splendid Place; 39 Taikoo Shing Road	2899	Q.B.M.L. 2	999 years from 18 April 1900	
Taikoo Wan Road	Cityplaza Four; 12 Taikoo Wan Road	2899	Q.B.M.L. 2	999 years from 18 April 1900	
Taikoo Wan Road	Cityplaza Three; 14 Taikoo Wan Road	2899	Q.B.M.L. 2	999 years from 18 April 1900	
Taikoo Wan Road	Harbour View Gardens Willow Mansion 22 Taikoo Wan Road	2899	Q.B.M.L. 2	999 years from 18 April 1900	
Taikoo Wan Road	Harbour View Gardens Banyan Mansion 24 Taikoo Wan Road	2899	Q.B.M.L. 2	999 years from 18 April 1900	
Taikoo Wan Road	Harbour View Gardens Pine Mansion 26 Taikoo Wan Road	2899	Q.B.M.L. 2	999 years from 18 April 1900	
Tong Chong Street	EAST Residences; 23 Tong Chong Street	2881	M.L. 703	ML 703 sI (part): 999 years from 2 February 1882	
Tong Chong Street	Sea View Building 29-41 Tong Chong Street 31-43 Hoi Wan Street	2881	M.L. 703	999 years from 2 February 1882	
Westlands Road	Fortwest Court; 1 Westlands Road	2881	Q.B.I.L. 15	999 years from 2 February 1882	
Westlands Road	TaiKoo Place One Island East 18 Westlands Road	2881/2899	Q.B.I.L. 15 Q.B.M.L 1 Q.B.M.L. 2	Leaseholds for the eight lots comprising One Island East expire in 2881 or 2899. QBML 1 s.C ss.5: 999 years from 2 February 1882 QBML 2 & Ext s.F: 999 years from 18 April 1900 QBML 1 s.C ss.6: 999 years from 2 February 1882 QBML 2 & Ext. s.G: 999 years from 18 April 1900 QBIL 15 s.D: 999 years from 2 February 1882 QBML 2 & Ext. R.P: 999 years from 18 April 1900 QBML 2 s.H R.P. & Ext.: 999 years from 18 April 1900 QBML 2 & Ext. s.H ss.6 s.B R.P.: 999 years from 18 April 1900	
Westlands Road	Westlands Centre; 20 Westlands Road	2899	Q.B.M.L. 1 Q.B.M.L. 2	QBML 1: 999 years from 18 April 1900; QBML 2: 999 years from 18 April 1900	
Yau Man Street	Kornville Tower; 38 Yau Man Street	2881	Q.B.I.L. 8	999 Years Commencing From 1882	

=== Southern District ===
The following table lists properties in the Southern District that have 999-year leases.

Table of Properties with 999-year leases in Southern District
Street	Building	Lease Expiration	Primary Lots	Notes	Ref
Aberdeen Main Road	Kin Fai Building; 18-20 Aberdeen Main Road	2859	A.I.L. 382	999 Years Commencing From 26 December 1860	
Aberdeen Main Road	90A-90B Aberdeen Main Road	2859	A.I.L. 15	999 Years Commencing From 26 December 1860	
Aberdeen Main Road	92 Aberdeen Main Road	2859	A.I.L. 15	999 Years Commencing From 26 December 1860	
Aberdeen Main Road	Ngan Fung Building; 94-98 Aberdeen Main Road	2859	A.I.L. 15	999 Years Commencing From 26 December 1860	
Aberdeen Main Road	100-102 Aberdeen Main Road	2859	A.I.L. 15 A.I.L. 16	999 Years Commencing From 26 December 1860	
Aberdeen Main Road	104-106 Aberdeen Main Road	2859	A.I.L. 16	999 Years Commencing From 26 December 1860	
Aberdeen Main Road	Bridal Tea House Hotel Aberdeen; 150 Aberdeen Main Road	2859	A.I.L. 98	999 years from 26 December 1860	
Aberdeen Main Road	Veng Hing Mansion; 152-156 Aberdeen Main Road	2859	A.I.L. 43; A.I.L. 66	999 years from 26 December 1860	
Aberdeen Main Road	Kong Kai Building; 184 Aberdeen Main Road	2859	A.I.L. 27	999 years from 26 December 1860	
Aberdeen Main Road	Yue Fai Commercial Centre; 208 Aberdeen Main Road	2859	A.I.L. 62	Aberdeen Inland Lot No. 62: 999 years commencing from 26 December 1860	
Aberdeen Main Road	Saint Peter's Church; 220 Aberdeen Main Road	2848	A.I.L. 1	Aberdeen Inland Lot No. 1: 999 years commencing from 31 August 1849	
Aberdeen Main Road	Shing Dao Industrial Building; 232 Aberdeen Main Road	2856	A.I.L. 303	999 years from 1 June 1857	
Aberdeen Main Road	Fullagar Industrial Building; 234 Aberdeen Main Road	2859	A.I.L. 305	999 years commencing on 26 December 1860	
Aberdeen Main Road	Aberdeen Industrial Building; 236 Aberdeen Main Road	2859	A.I.L. 34	999 years commencing on 26 December 1860	
Bisney Road	CNT Bisney; 28 Bisney Road	2859	I.L. 623	999 Years Commencing From 16 April 1860	
Bisney Road	Sunlight Court; 30-32 Bisney Road	2859	I.L. 623	999 Years Commencing From 16 April 1860	
Bisney Road	Regent Palisades; 43 Bisney Road	2859	I.L. 623	999 Years Commencing From 16 April 1860	
Bisney Road	Albany Court; 51-53 Bisney Road	2859	I.L. 623	999 Years Commencing From 16 April 1860	
Bisney Road	Bisney Crest; 57 Bisney Road	2859	I.L. 623	999 Years Commencing From 16 April 1860	
Bisney Road	La Mer; 67-71 Bisney Road	2859	I.L. 623	999 Years Commencing From 16 April 1860	
Bisney Road	Bisney Terrace; 73 Bisney Road	2859	I.L. 623	999 Years Commencing From 16 April 1860	
Consort Rise	3 Consort Rise	2859	I.L. 623	IL 623: 999 years commencing from 16 April 1860	
Consort Rise	King's Court; 9 Consort Rise	2859	I.L. 623	IL 623: 999 years commencing from 16 April 1860	
Consort Rise	Cherry Court; 10-12 Consort Rise	2859	I.L. 623	IL 623: 999 years commencing from 16 April 1860	
Consort Rise	Honour Garden; 11 Consort Rise	2859	I.L. 623	IL 623: 999 years commencing from 16 April 1860	
Consort Rise	Chun Fai Yuen; 15 Consort Rise	2859	I.L. 623	IL 623: 999 years commencing from 16 April 1860	
Consort Rise	Consort Garden; 22-24 Consort Rise	2859	I.L. 623	IL 623: 999 years commencing from 16 April 1860	
Consort Rise	Consort Villas; 23-25 Consort Rise	2859	I.L. 623	IL 623: 999 years commencing from 16 April 1860	
Consort Rise	27-29 Consort Rise	2859	I.L. 623	IL 623: 999 years commencing from 16 April 1860	
Consort Rise	Glamour Court; 39 Consort Rise	2859	I.L. 623	IL 623: 999 years commencing from 16 April 1860	
Crown Terrace	May Court; 4 Crown Terrace	2859	I.L. 623	IL 623: 999 years commencing from 16 April 1860	
Crown Terrace	Bisney Villas; 18-22 Crown Terrace	2859	I.L. 623	IL 623: 999 years commencing from 16 April 1860	
Hing Wo Street	Man King Building 1-3 Hing Wo Street 49 Shek Pai Wan Road	2853	A.I.L. 333	999 Years Commencing From 27 September 1854	
Ka Wo Street	Kam Tseuk Mansion; 1-3 Ka Wo Street	2887	A.I.L. 224; A.I.L. 225	999 Years Commencing From 13 December 1888	
Ka Wo Street	Ka Fook Court 2-10 Ka Wo Street 1-3 Tin Wan Street	2887	A.I.L. 236 A.I.L. 235 A.I.L. 234 A.I.L. 233 A.I.L. 232 A.I.L. 231	999 Years Commencing From 13 December 1888	
Ka Wo Street	Yee Tiam Building; 5-11 Ka Wo Street	2887	A.I.L. 223 A.I.L. 222 A.I.L. 221 A.I.L. 220	999 Years Commencing From 13 December 1888	
Ka Wo Street	Ka Wo Building; 14-22 Ka Wo Street	2887	A.I.L. 230 A.I.L. 229 A.I.L. 228 A.I.L. 227 A.I.L. 226 A.I.L. 237 A.I.L. 238	999 Years Commencing From 13 December 1888	
Ka Wo Street	Shun Fung Court; 15 Ka Wo Street	2887	A.I.L. 218 A.I.L. 217 A.I.L. 216	999 Years Commencing From 13 December 1888	
Ka Wo Street	Ever Secure Mansion; 21-25 Ka Wo Street	2887	A.I.L. 216	999 Years Commencing From 13 December 1888	
Ka Wo Street	Tai Tak House; 27-33B Ka Wo Street	2887	A.I.L. 215	999 Years Commencing From 13 December 1888	
Nam Ning Street	Aberdeen Centre; Nam Ning Street	2856		Conditions of Exchange 10511 and 10513: 999 years from 1 June 1857	
Old Main Street	May Court; 56 Old Main Street	2859	A.I.L. 329	999 Years Commencing From 26 December 1860	
Old Main Street	Hip Sing Mansion; 58-62 Old Main Street	2859	A.I.L. 49	999 Years Commencing From 26 December 1860	
Old Main Street	Ocean House; 64-70 Old Main Street	2859	A.I.L. 48; A.I.L. 50	999 Years Commencing From 26 December 1860	
Old Main Street	Southsky; 80 Old Main Street	2859	A.I.L. 55 A.I.L. 64 A.I.L. 161	999 Years Commencing From 26 December 1860	
Old Main Street	On Fai Building; 82 Old Main Street	2859	A.I.L. 383	999 Years Commencing From 26 December 1860	
Old Main Street	Comfort Centre 108 Old Main Street 18 Yue Fai Road	2859	A.I.L. 56 A.I.L. 59 A.I.L. 60	999 Years Commencing From 26 December 1860	
Old Main Street	Siu Kwan Mansion; 120 Old Main Street	2859	A.I.L. 426; A.I.L. 68	AIL 426: Extended Until 30 June 2047 AIL 68: 999 Years Commencing From 26 December 1860	
Old Main Street	Kam Heung Mansion; 128 Old Main Street	2859	A.I.L. 51	999 Years Commencing From 26 December 1860	
Pok Fu Lam Road	Pokfulam Village	2882	P.V.L. 1-36	999 Years Commencing From 1 January 1893	
Pok Fu Lam Road	Chinese Christian Cemetery; 125 Pok Fu Lam Road	2882	I.L. 7760	IL 7760 R.P. & Extension: 999 years from 25 December 1883	
Scenic Villa Drive	Scenic Villas; 2-28 Scenic Villa Drive	2859	I.L. 2596	999 Years Commencing From 16 April 1860	
Shek O Village Road	405 & 407 Shek O Village Road		S.O.I.L. 11; S.O.I.L. 12; S.O.I.L. 24	999 Years	
Shek Pai Wan Road	Full Jade Mansion 48-54 Shek Pai Wan Road 6-8 Yue Wok Street	2887	A.I.L. 175 A.I.L. 176 A.I.L. 177 A.I.L. 178	999 Years Commencing From 13 December 1888	
Shek Pai Wan Road	Tai Lok House; 53-53C Shek Pai Wan Road	2887	A.I.L. 201	999 Years Commencing From 13 December 1888	
Shek Pai Wan Road	Wayland House; 55-61 Shek Pai Wan Road	2887	A.I.L. 202 A.I.L. 203 A.I.L. 204	999 years commencing from 13 December 1888	
Shek Pai Wan Road	Yen Shing Mansion; 60 Shek Pai Wan Road	2887	A.I.L. 179 A.I.L. 180 A.I.L. 181 A.I.L. 182	999 years commencing from 13 December 1888	
Shek Pai Wan Road	South View Garden; 80 Shek Pai Wan Road	2887	A.I.L. 184 A.I.L. 185 A.I.L. 186 A.I.L. 187 A.I.L. 188 A.I.L. 189 A.I.L. 190 A.I.L. 191	999 Years Commencing From 13 December 1888	
Shek Pai Wan Road	Silver Mansion; 81 Shek Pai Wan Road	2887	A.I.L. 211 A.I.L. 212 A.I.L. 213 A.I.L. 214	999 Years Commencing From 13 December 1888	
Shek Pai Wan Road	Fu Yue Court; 88-88A Shek Pai Wan Road	2887	A.I.L. 193 A.I.L. 194	999 Years Commencing From 13 December 1888	
Shek Pai Wan Road	Sze Hei Building; 90-96 Shek Pai Wan Road	2887	A.I.L. 195 A.I.L. 196 A.I.L. 197 A.I.L. 198	999 Years Commencing From 13 December 1888	
Stanley Main Street	Warwick House; 5 Stanley Main Street	2840	S.T.L. 386; S.T.L. 387	999 years from 26 January 1841	
Stanley Main Street	7 Stanley Main Street	2840	S.T.L. 63	999 years from 26 January 1841	
Stanley Main Street	18-20B Stanley Main Street	2840	S.T.L. 510; S.T.I.L. 51	999 years from 26 January 1841	
Stanley Main Street	Yau Wing Lau; 34-38 Stanley Main Street	2840	S.T.L. 389	999 years from 26 January 1841	
Stanley Main Street	Yau Shing Lau; 52-56 Stanley Main Street	2840	S.T.L. 439 S.T.L. 440 S.T.L. 441	999 years from 26 January 1841	
Stanley Main Street	78 Stanley Main Street	2893	S.T.L. 428	999 years from 1894	
Stanley Main Street	79 Stanley Main Street	2893	S.T.L. 427	999 years from 1894	
Stanley Main Street	Pang Fat Lau; 130 Stanley Main Street	2840	S.T.L. 476; S.T.L. 478	999 years from 26 January 1841	
Tang Fung Street	South Coast; 1 Tang Fung Street	2887	A.I.L. 269 A.I.L. 270 A.I.L. 271 A.I.L. 272 A.I.L. 273 A.I.L. 274	999 years commencing from 13 December 1888	
Tin Wan Street	South Walk Aura; 12 Tin Wan Street	2887	A.I.L. 254 A.I.L. 255 A.I.L. 256 A.I.L. 257	999 Years commencing from 13 December 1888	
Victoria Road	Victoria Coast; 301 Victoria Road	2859	I.L. 2603	999 Years Commencing From 16 April 1860	
Victoria Road	Baguio Villa (Except Blocks 41 to 44); 555 Victoria Road	2859	I.L. 8334	Conditions of Exchange No. UB10485: 999 years from 26 December 1860	

=== Yau Tsim Mong District ===
The following table lists properties in the Yau Tsim Mong District that have 999-year leases.

Table of Properties with 999-year leases in Yau Tsim Mong District
Street	Building	Lease Expiration	Primary Lots	Notes	Ref
(Multiple streets)	Cosmopolitan Estate	2870	K.M.L 28	999 years from 5 August 1871	
(Multiple streets)	Harbour City; Ocean Terminal and the Extension	2863	K.I.L 11178; K.M.L. 10	K.I.L 11178: Conditions of Exchange No. 20166 for a term of 21 years commencing from 12 June 2012. K.M.L 10: 999 years commencing from 25 July 1864	
(Multiple streets)	Harbour City; Gateway Arcade	2880		999 years commencing from 13 September 1881	
Canton Road	Harbour City The Marco Polo Hongkong Hotel 3 Canton Road	2863	K.M.L. 91; K.M.L. 10	K.M.L. 91, 10: 999 years commencing from 25 July 1864	
Canton Road	Harbour City Ocean Centre 5 Canton Road	2880	K.M.L. 11	999 years commencing from 13 September 1881	
Canton Road	Harbour City Wharf T & T Centre 7 Canton Road	2880	K.M.L. 11	K.M.L. 11 sB & ext: Conditions of Extension No. 11410 for 999 years commencing from 13 September 1881; K.M.L. 11 sD: expires 30 June 2047	
Canton Road	Harbour City Ocean Galleries 7-23 Canton Road	2880	K.M.L. 11	K.M.L. 11 sB & ext: Conditions of Extension No. 11410 for 999 years commencing from 13 September 1881; K.M.L. 11 sD: expires 30 June 2047	
Canton Road	Harbour City Gateway II 7-23 Canton Road	2880	K.M.L. 11	K.M.L. 11 sB & ext: Conditions of Extension No. 11410 for 999 years commencing from 13 September 1881; K.M.L. 11 sD: expires 30 June 2047	
Canton Road	Harbour City World Commerce Centre 11 Canton Road	2880	K.M.L. 11	K.M.L. 11 sB & ext: Conditions of Extension No. 11410 for 999 years commencing from 13 September 1881; K.M.L. 11 sD: expires 30 June 2047	
Canton Road	Harbour City Gateway, Hong Kong 13 Canton Road	2880	K.M.L. 11	K.M.L. 11 sB & ext: Conditions of Extension No. 11410 for 999 years commencing from 13 September 1881; K.M.L. 11 sD: expires 30 June 2047	
Canton Road	Harbour City World Finance Centre 17-19 Canton Road	2880	K.M.L. 11	K.M.L. 11 sB & ext: Conditions of Extension No. 11410 for 999 years commencing from 13 September 1881; K.M.L. 11 sD: expires 30 June 2047	
Canton Road	Harbour City Prince Hotel, Hong Kong 23 Canton Road	2880	K.M.L. 11	K.M.L. 11 sB & ext: Conditions of Extension No. 11410 for 999 years commencing from 13 September 1881; K.M.L. 11 sD: expires 30 June 2047	
Canton Road	Harbour City Gateway I 25-27 Canton Road	2880	K.M.L. 11	999 years commencing from 13 September 1881	
Chung Wui Street	Chung Wo Building; 1-27 Chung Wui Street	2870	K.M.L. 28	999 years commencing from 5 August 1871	
Chung Wui Street	Chung Hing Building; 29-55 Chung Wui Street	2870	K.M.L. 28	999 years commencing from 5 August 1871	
Chung Wui Street	Chung Sing Building; 57-69 Lok Kwan Street	2870	K.M.L. 28	999 years commencing from 5 August 1871	
Fuk Chak Street	Upper West; 18-20 Fuk Chak Street	2870	K.M.L. 28	999 years commencing from 5 August 1871	
Fuk Chak Street	Wing Fat Building; 24-30 Fuk Chak Street	2870	K.M.L. 28	999 years commencing from 5 August 1871	
Fuk Chak Street	Aquila Square Mile; 38 Fuk Chak Street	2870	K.M.L. 28	Kowloon Marine Lot No. 28: 999 years commencing from 5 August 1871	
Kok Cheung Street	25-29 Kok Cheung Street	2870	K.M.L. 28	Kowloon Marine Lots (KMLs) No. 28 s.K RP and 28 s.M ss.2 RP: 999 years from 5 August 1871	
Kok Cheung Street	Chung Yew Building; 73-99 Kok Cheung Street	2870	K.M.L. 28	999 years commencing from 5 August 1871	
Kok Cheung Street	Chung Kin Building; 78-96 Kok Cheung Street	2870	K.M.L. 28	999 years commencing from 5 August 1871	
Lok Kwan Street	Chung Yuen Building; 1-19 Lok Kwan Street	2870	K.M.L. 28	999 years commencing from 5 August 1871	
Li Tak Street	Tsin Shui Building; 2-16 Li Tak Street	2870	K.M.L. 28	999 years commencing from 5 August 1871	
Li Tak Street	Eltanin Square Mile; 11 Li Tak Street	2870	K.M.L. 28	999 Years commencing From 5 August 1871	
Li Tak Street	Kar Hing Building; 20-26 Li Tak Street	2870	K.M.L. 28	999 Years commencing From 5 August 1871	
Li Tak Street	Metroplace Olympic Hotel; 36-38 Li Tak Street	2870	K.M.L. 28	999 Years commencing From 5 August 1871	
Li Tak Street	Hoi Kwok Building; 44-54 Li Tak Street; 20 Kok Cheung Street	2870	K.M.L. 28	999 Years commencing From 5 August 1871	
Sham Mong Road	The Quinn．Square Mile; 5 Sham Mong Road	2870	K.M.L. 28	999 Years commencing From 5 August 1871	
Salisbury Road	Star House; 3 Salisbury Road	2863	K.M.L. 10	999 Years Commencing From 25 July 1864	
Tai Kok Tsui Road	Hing Wong Mansion; 67-85 Tai Kok Tsui Road	2870	K.M.L. 28	999 years commencing from 5 August 1871	
Tai Kok Tsui Road	Chung Mei Building; 149-157 Tai Kok Tsui Road	2870	K.M.L. 28	999 years commencing from 5 August 1871	
Tai Kok Tsui Road	Chung Ying Building; 159-167 Tai Kok Tsui Road	2870	K.M.L. 28	999 years commencing from 5 August 1871	

=== Kowloon City District ===
The following table lists properties in the Kowloon City District that have 999-year leases.

Table of Properties with 999-year leases in Kowloon City District
Street	Building	Lease Expiration	Primary Lots	Notes	Ref
Baker Street	Hunghom Bay Centre; 92-112 Baker Street	2886	H.H.M.L. 1	999 years from 21 March 1887	
Bulkeley Street	Baker Circle Greenwich; 18 Bulkeley Street	2886	H.H.M.L. 1	999 years from 21 March 1887	
Gillies Avenue South	Baker Circle Dover; 38 Gillies Avenue South	2886	H.H.M.L. 1	999 years from 21 March 1887	
Ming On Street	Whampoa Building 1-29 Ming On Street 87-101 Baker Street	2886	H.H.M.L. 1	999 years from 21 March 1887	
Ming On Street	Lux Theatre Building; 2-20 Ming On Street	2886	H.H.M.L. 1	999 years from 21 March 1887	}}
Whampoa Street	The Haddon; 1 Whampoa Street	2886	H.H.M.L. 1	999 years from 21 March 1887	
Whampoa Street	The Chester; 8 Whampoa Street	2886	H.H.M.L. 1	999 years from 21 March 1887	
Whampoa Street	Baker Circle Euston; 33 Whampoa Street	2886	H.H.M.L. 1	999 years from 21 March 1887	
Wu Kwong Street	United Building; 1-7 Wu Kwong Street	2886	H.H.M.L. 1	999 Years Commencing From 21 March 1887	

== See also ==
- 999-year lease
