= 999-year leases in Hong Kong =

Type of lease in Hong Kong

999-year leases in Hong Kong are a rare form of lease in Hong Kong.

== History ==
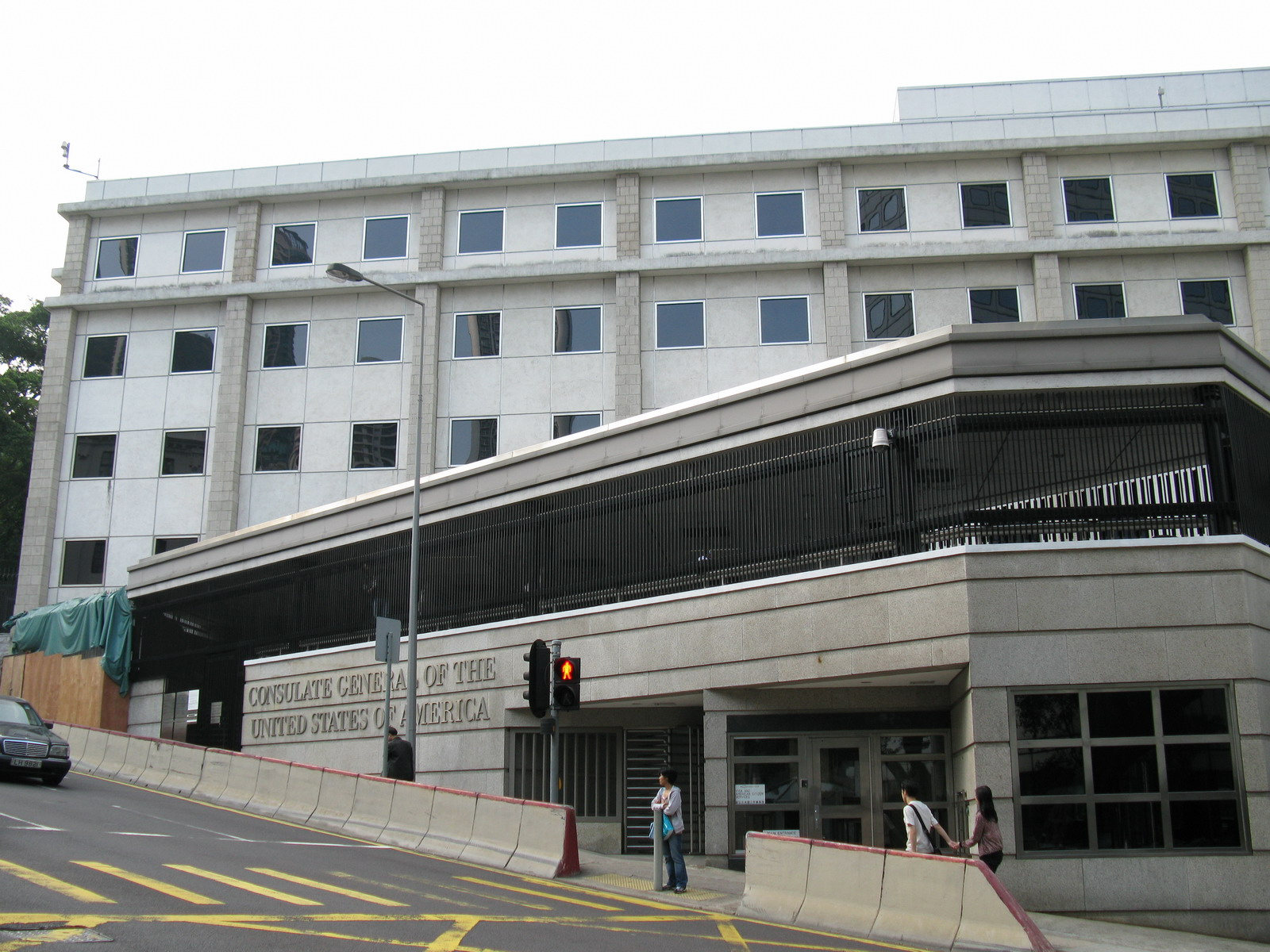
Consulate General of the United States, which has the last 999-year lease in Hong Kong.

They were almost exclusively granted from 1849 to May 1898 on Hong Kong Island and in Kowloon (South of Boundary Street). Some exceptions include Hang Cheong Tai Building (1900), Cheung Ling Mansion (1900), Ka Yue Building (1901), Princeton Tower (1901), Lun Fung Court (1903) and the Consulate General of the United States, Hong Kong and Macau, which was granted a 999-year lease in April 1999. The US Consulate had an option to buy the plot as a freehold in its 1950 lease, but this was eliminated in 1999 in exchange for the 999-year lease.

The only current freehold in all of Hong Kong belongs to St John's Cathedral, which was granted freehold in 1847 with perpetual ownership under the condition that the land be used as a church. The University of Hong Kong had a freehold, which was surrendered in the 1920s in exchange for a 999-year lease.

Some leases were marginally shorter, ranging from 978 to 997 years. In a December 2016 research publication, the Legislative Council said that "At present, only a few pieces of land on the Hong Kong Island and in Kowloon are with the lease term of 999 years."

== Lots ==
Land in Hong Kong is separated into "lots", pieces of land which are leased out by the government. Lots can be further broken down into portions of Sections, Sub Sections, Remaining Portions, and Extensions.

A single building can be erected on one lot or a combination of different lots and portions. As each lot is leased out by the government with its own terms, a single building may therefore sit on land with multiple lease terms. For example, Floral Tower at 22 Robinson Road is built on 3 lots, each with different terms- IL 347: 999 years from 27 November 1849, IL 392: 999 years from 17 March 1855, and IL 717: 999 years from 25 June 1861.

The government provides several tools which can be used to inspect lots:

- Geoinfo Map - a map which displays lots and associated buildings/addresses
- Street Index - a text version of Geoinfo Map
- IRIS - a database where details of each lot (such as terms of length) can be obtained

By using these tools, a lot can be inspected to see if it has a lease of 999 years, and all buildings on those associated lots can be listed- therefore, a list of every building which has a 999 year lease can be generated.

== Valuation ==
In the 2008 research paper, "Intergenerational Discounting: A Case from Hong Kong" from the University of Hong Kong, researchers found that properties on lots with 999-year leases commanded a premium of 5.74% over similar properties on lots with 99-year leases in the time period from 1992 to 2006.

== Locations ==
Hong Kong Island
Location	Distribution
Central	Most parts of south of Connaught Road Central and Murray Road
Sheung Wan	Most parts of south of Connaught Road West
Sai Wan (Sai Ying Pun)	Most parts of south of Connaught Road West
Sai Wan (Shek Tong Tsui)	Most parts of south of Connaught Road West
Sai Wan (Kennedy Town)	Most parts of south of Des Voeux Road West / New Praya, Kennedy Town, east of Cadogan Street, north of Forbes Street / Rock Hill Street; Small parts in Victoria Road (Regent Height)
Mount Davis	Small parts of Mount Davis Road (Chiu Yuen Cemetery)
The Peak	Parts of Peak Road; Parts of Mount Kellett Road
Mid Levels	Most parts of south of Caine Road / Bonham Road / Robinson Road and north of Conduit Road; Most parts of Old Peak Road
Wan Chai	Most parts between Johnston Road / Hennessy Road (from Heard Street to Canal Road West) and Queen's Road East; Most parts among Queen's Road East, Yen Wah Steps and Kennedy Road; Most parts among Heng Shan Centre in Queen's Road East, Monmouth Path and Star Street; Small parts in Gloucester Road (YF Life Centre (partly))
Causeway Bay	Most parts among Canal Road West, Hennessy Road / Yee Wo Street / Causeway Road and Leighton Road; Most parts of the junction of Leighton Road and Caroline Hill Road; Most parts among Paterson Street, Gloucester Road and Yee Wo Street; Most parts among Cannon Street, Gloucester Road, Paterson Street and Lockhart Road; Most parts among Tung Lo Wan Road, Causeway Road, Moreton Terrace and Shelter Street
Tin Hau	Around King's Road, Mercury Street, Jupiter Street and Electric Road
Tai Hang	Around Sun Chun Street; Small parts in Wun Sha Street, Ormsby Street and Brown Street
Happy Valley	Around south of Wong Nai Chung Road and north of Blue Pool Road; Small parts in Shan Kwong Road (Jewish Cemetery, Hong Kong)
Pok Fu Lam	Around Bisney Road, Consort Rise and Crown Terrace; Small parts in Scenic Villa Drive; Small parts in Victoria Road (Baguio Villa); Parts in Pok Fu Lam Village
Aberdeen	Part between Aberdeen Main Road and Aberdeen Chinese Permanent Cemetery; Part between Aberdeen Main Road and Tsung Man Street; Most parts between Aberdeen Main Road and Yue Fai Road; Part between Aberdeen Main Road and Yue Kwong Road; Aberdeen Centre
Tin Wan	Junction of Tin Wan Street, Tang Fung Street and Ka Wo Street; Among Tin Wan Street, Ka Wo Street, Hing Wo Street, Shek Pai Wan Road and Yue Wok Street
Stanley	Around Stanley Main Street
Shek O	Around Shek O Village Road
North Point	Among King's Road, Ming Yuen West Street, Peacock Street, Kam Ping Street and Shu Kuk Street; Small parts in Java Road (Kodak House I and II); Small parts in Electric Road (Harbour Heights)
Braemar Hill	Small parts in Braemar Hill Road (Braemar Hill Mansions)
Quarry Bay	Among King's Road, Finney Street, Hoi Tai Street and Tai Cheung Street; Among King's Road, Mansion Street and Tsat Tsz Mui Road; Parts in Quarry Bay Street
Sai Wan Ho	Small parts in Sai Wan Ho Street; Small parts in Shau Kei Wan Road
Shau Kei Wan	Around Shau Kei Wan Main Street East; Among Factory Street, Aldrich Street and Shau Kei Wan Road; Parts between Shau Kei Wan Road and Nam On Street; Between A Kung Ngam Village Road and Tung Hei Road; Parts in A Kung Ngam Village
Source: Geoinfo Map (for finding primary lots) Property.hk CyberNet Property (for finding land lease expiry year)

Kowloon
Location	Distribution
Tai Kok Tsui	Among Tai Kok Tsui Road, Wai On Street, Sham Mong Road and Fuk Chak Street
Tsim Sha Tsui	Among Canton Road, Gateway Boulevard and Salisbury Road
Hung Hom	Among Gillies Avenue South, Bulkeley Street, Po Loy Street and Hung Hom South Road
Source: Geoinfo Map (for finding primary lots) Property.hk CyberNet Property (for finding land lease expiry year)

== See also ==
- 999-year lease
- List of properties with 999-year leases in Hong Kong
