= Java Road =

Street in Hong Kong

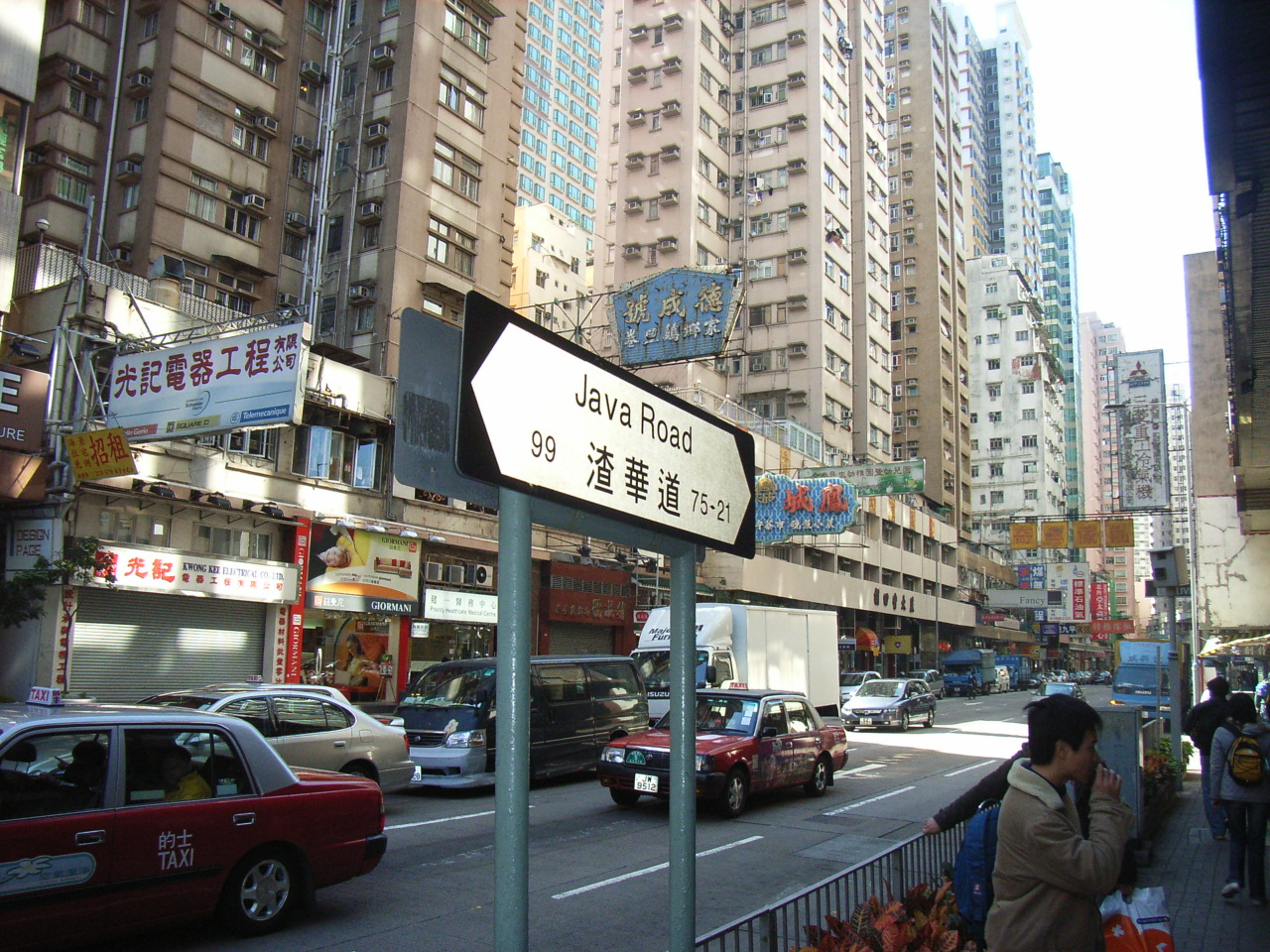
- Java Road
- Native name: 渣華道 (Yue Chinese)
- Namesake: Koninklijke Java-China Paketvaart Lijnen
- Location: North Point, Hong Kong Island, Hong Kong
- Coordinates: 22.29201°N 114.19823°E
- From: Junction of Electric Road and Tin Chong Street
- To: King's Road

Java Road (Chinese: 渣華道) is a street in North Point on Hong Kong Island, Hong Kong. It runs from the junction of Electric Road and Tin Chong Street in Fortress Hill to meet King's Road in Quarry Bay, near Hong Kong Funeral Home.

== History ==
Completed in 1933, the road was named after the Dutch shipping firm Koninklijke Java-China Paketvaart Lijnen (爪哇輪船公司; known outside the Netherlands as Royal Interocean Lines, RIL)–itself named for the island of Java in Indonesia (then Netherlands East Indies)—which had its operational headquarters there for much of the 20th century. The company provided sea routes between Hong Kong, Shanghai, Jakarta, Medan, Surabaya, Makassar and elsewhere. The Chinese name of the road was originally 爪哇道. The road name is also associated with the sugar importing empire of Kwok Chun Yeung (郭春秧; Kwik Djoen Eng in Hokkien; after whom Chun Yeung Street was named), across whose reclaimed land (between Tin Chong Street and Tong Shui Road, the current water's edge and King's Road) it runs. Java was the source of his sugar.

There was a Java Road Elementary School near the North Point Ferry Pier; it has since closed.

== Features ==
Buildings along the street include:

- No. 99. Java Road Municipal Services Building. In the building, there is a market (from G/F to 1/F), the Java Road Cooked Food Centre (2/F), a sports centre with facilities including a basketball court, three squash courts, a dance room, children's soft play room, and an American pool room (from 3/F to 5/F).
- No. 222. Customs Headquarters Building
- No. 303. ICAC Building
- No. 333. North Point Government Offices

== See also ==
- List of streets and roads in Hong Kong
