= Oil Street =

Street in Hong Kong

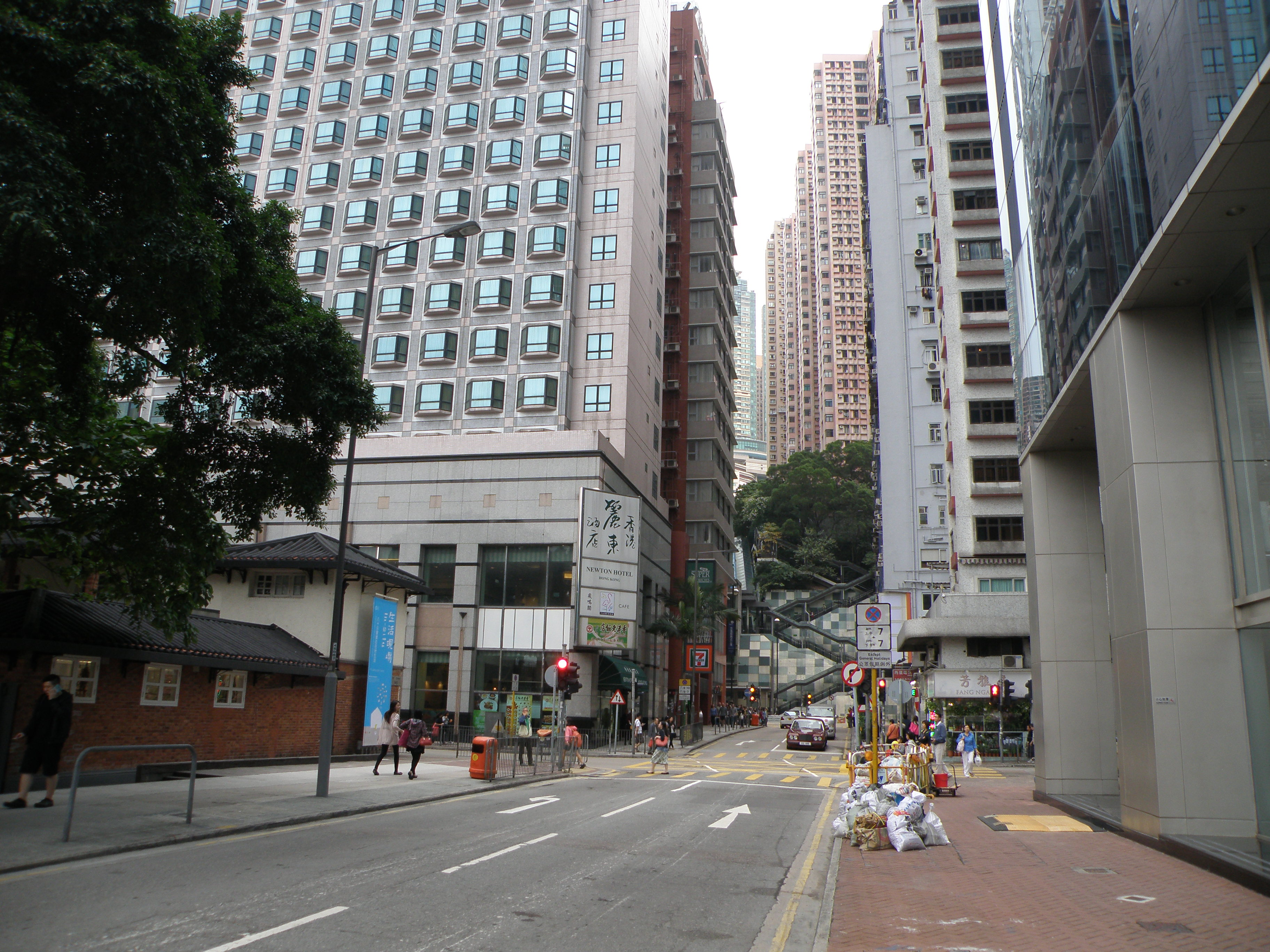
View of Oil Street, looking southeast towards King's Road

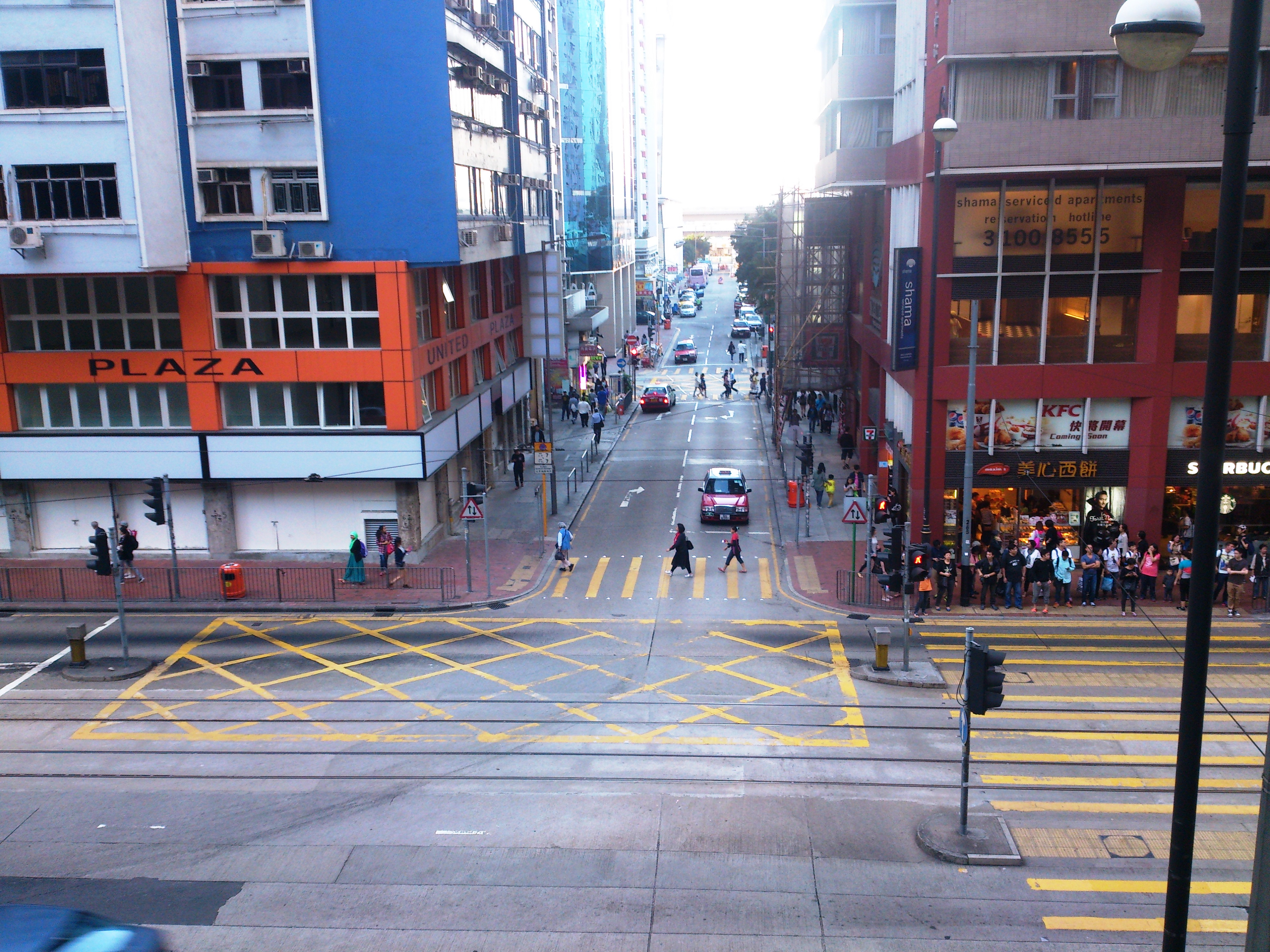
View of Oil Street, looking northwest from King's Road

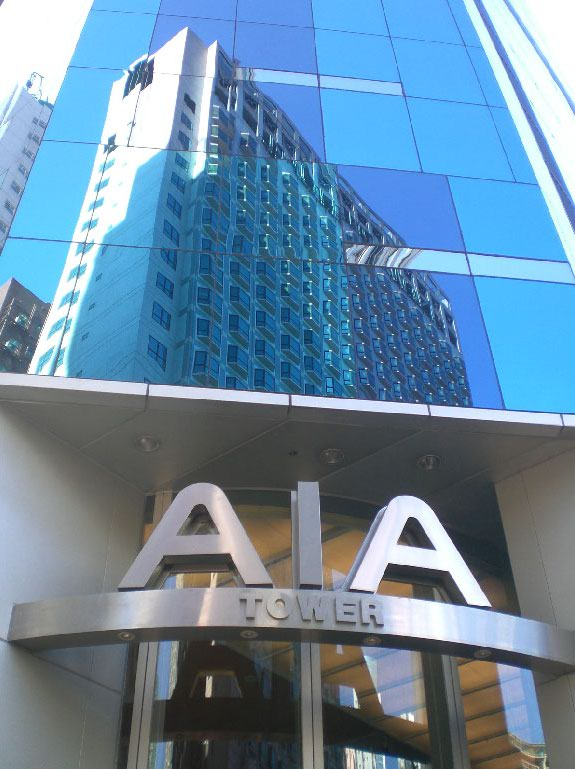
Entrance of AIA Tower at the corner of Oil Street and Electric Road, with a reflection of the Newton Hotel.

Oil Street (Chinese: 油街; Jyutping: jau4 gaai1) is a street in Fortress Hill on Hong Kong Island near Fortress Hill station.

Buildings along the street include the Newton Hotel (closed on 25 August 2015), AIA Tower, the former headquarters and clubhouse of the Royal Hong Kong Yacht Club (listed as a Grade II historic buildings), Government Logistics Department's depot and the Harbor Grand Hotel.

Oil Street has a northwest-southeast orientation. It starts east at King's Road, then crosses Electric Road, has intersections with Wang On Road (宏安道) and King Wah Road (京華道), passes under the Island Eastern Corridor and ends shortly thereafter near the shore of Victoria Harbour.

== Oil street art village ==
The Oil Street ex-Government Supplies Department had been lent to local artists and organisations as short-term tenants, after the relocation of the department in 1998. The building was used as the studio of artists and a venue for artistic event, named the Oil Street Artist Village, which is the Hong Kong's first locally formed art community. After the building was vacated in 2000, some tenants had been moved to the Cattle Depot Artist Village located in To Kwa Wan.

== Oi! Art Space ==
Oi! is an art space developed by the Leisure and Cultural Services Department in 2013, aiming at promoting arts and providing venue for exhibition. It is located at 12 Oil Street, next to the now demolished Government Supplies Department. "Oi!" came from the name of the street, Oil Street. It is also a greeting to call people to participate in art event. In Cantonese, the Chinese name of Oi! is the homonym of its address ( "12" is a homonym for "release" ). The present building of Oi! is the former clubhouse of Royal Hong Kong Yacht Club from 1908 to 1938, which had been listed as a Grade II historic building since 1995. Later, it was used as the Government Supplies Department until 1998. In 1990 to 2000, it was the Oil Street Artist Village, and further changed to a storehouse of the Antiquities and Monuments Office until late 2007.

== 218 Electric Road ==
=== Hong Kong Newton Hotel ===
The Hong Kong Newton Hotel was located at 218 Electric Road, North Point, Hong Kong Island, at the corner of Oil Street. It wais a renowned three-star hotel with 362 rooms and belongs to Henderson Land Development Company Limited. Henderson Land Development's three Newton hotels experienced a decline in room rates and occupancy rates. Intense market competition, coupled with a 3.8% drop in overnight visitors to Hong Kong, led to a decline in performance. Under this financial pressure, Henderson Land Development closed the Hong Kong Newton Hotel on 25 August 2015. The property was originally planned to be converted into an office building.

=== Hong Kong Li-Ning Building ===
The former site of the Newton Hotel Hong Kong was completely demolished and redeveloped into a 22-storey brand-new, eco-friendly commercial skyscraper known as Harbour East.

On 10 December 2023, Li Ning Group announced that it had acquired the Hong Kong East Commercial Building at 218 Electric Road, North Point, from Henderson Land Development for HK$2.208 billion, and planned to use part of the property as the group's Hong Kong headquarters. The property was previously valued at HK$2.46 billion, meaning that Li Ning Group acquired the property at a 10.2% discount. After the acquisition, Harbour East was renamed the Hong Kong Li Ning Building.

== Oil street future development ==
A large-scale development project will be carried out at Inland Lot No. 8920 of Oil Street in the near future, after the Lands Department announced that the Ocean Century Investment Limited was awarded the land grant last for 50 years by beating other five companies and became the highest tender. This site has been left vacant since the late 1990s after the Government Supplies Department (GSD) vacated away. It covers around 7,887 square metres while the maximum gross floor area (GFA) is 70,200 square metres. At least 30,000 square metres of it has to be hotel-purpose land use and any ancillary accommodations and the rest of the GFA can be used in any way but industrial usage. According to the proposal submitted by the Ocean Century Investment Limited, the project will mainly be divided into three parts, which is the construction of hotels, residential areas and the public areas. The residential land use will include less than 400 dwelling units with a maximum of 40,200 domestic gross floor areas. Together with it, ancillary accommodations like resident's clubhouse and recreational areas will be included. In terms of the hotel, it will be built in the shape of sailboat, which is similar to the design of the Burj Al Arab hotel in Dubai. The development project will also cover the construction of public open space, for instance, three public open space areas and a wide Sculpture Plaza with exhibition of art pieces that serves an extension to the future Art Space revitalised from the former Yacht Club.

== City Legend ==
There are city legends passed by the residents who lived in Oil Street. The residents claimed that there were voice and light-fire appeared in the mortuary which have stopped working in 1998. The other ghost stories, including the red headscarf floated from minibus and the accident happened in an elevator of industrial building. This kind of stories determined the image of Oil Street and made its fame of ghost stories in Hong Kong.
