= AIA Tower =

Skyscraper in Hong Kong

- 友邦廣場
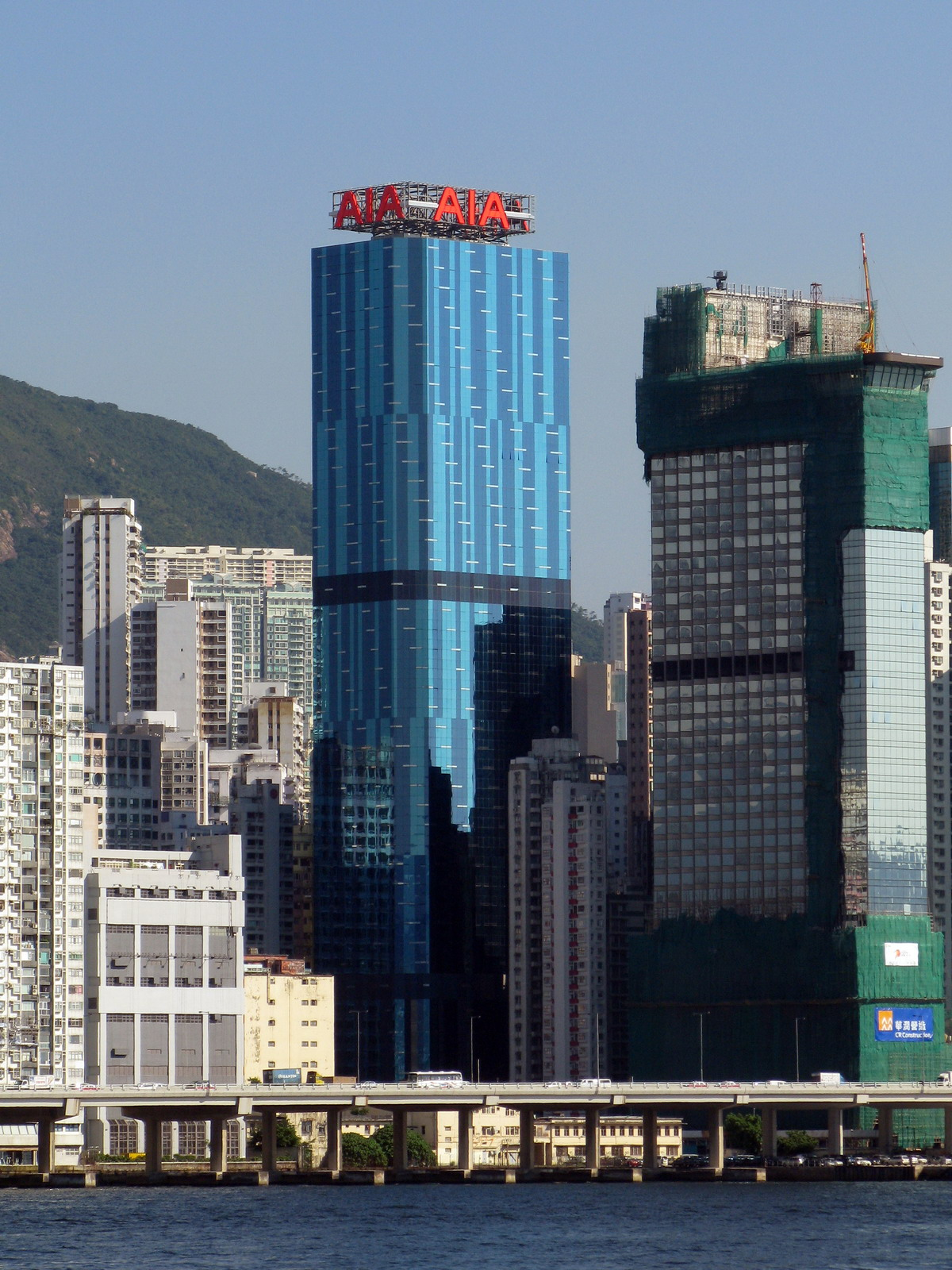
- View of AIA Tower from Victoria Harbour
- Interactive map of the AIA Tower area

General information
- Status: Completed
- Location: No. 183 Electric Road, Fortress Hill, North Point, Hong Kong
- Coordinates: 22°17′20″N 114°11′32″E
- Completed: 1999; 27 years ago
- Opening: 1999; 27 years ago

Height
- Roof: 180 m (590 ft)

Technical details
- Floor count: 44
- Floor area: 700,000 sq. ft.

Design and construction
- Architects: P & T Architects & Engineers Ltd. Andrew Lee King Fun & Associates; RAD/Aaron Tan Hee Hung
- Developer: Henderson Land Development
- Main contractor: Hang Tat Construction

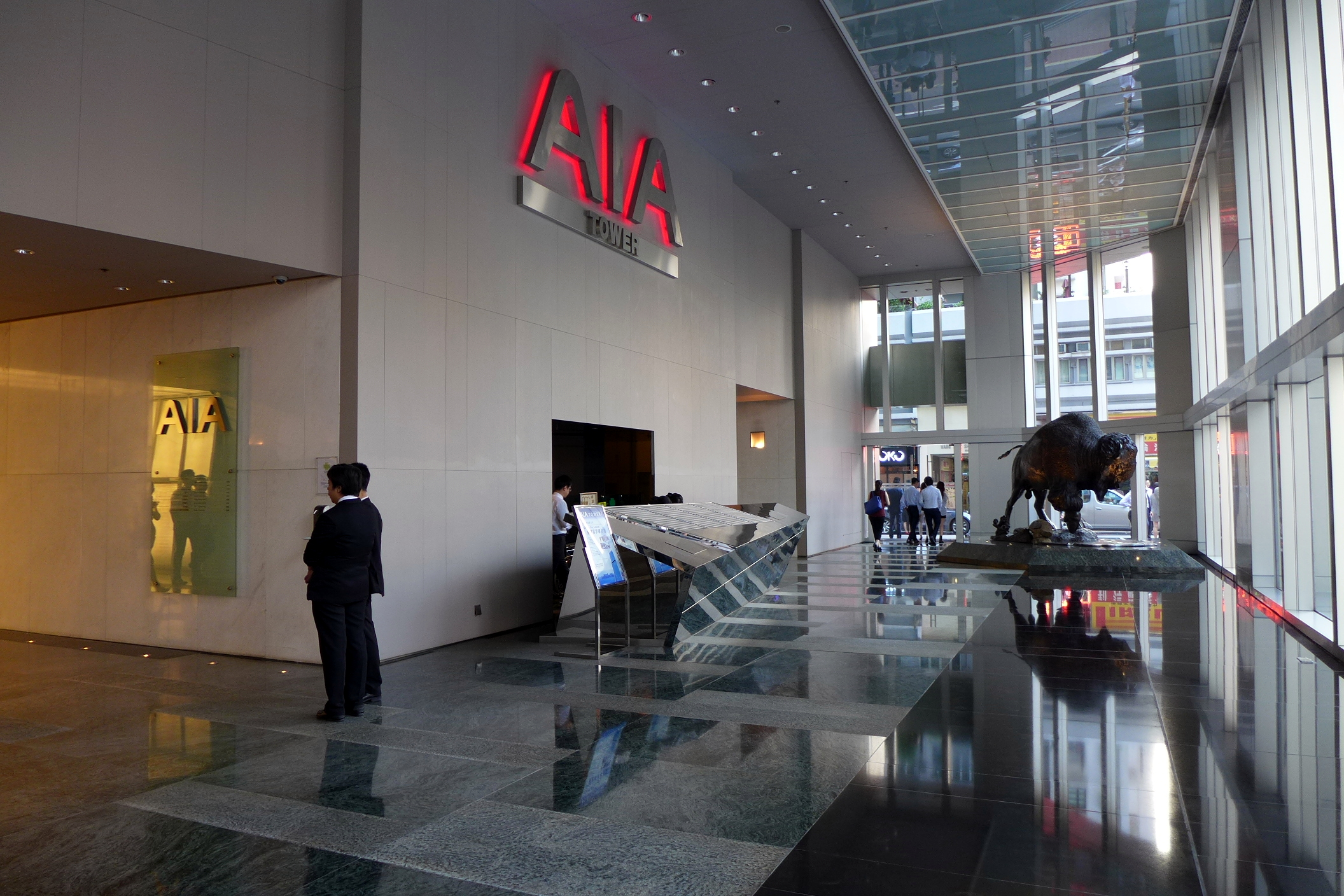
Office lobby before renovation in 2016

The AIA Tower (Chinese: 友邦廣場) is a skyscraper located in the North Point area of Hong Kong near Fortress Hill station. It was named after American International Assurance, a former member of American International Group, which occupies 12 floors of the building.

== Overview ==
=== Location ===
AIA Tower is located at No. 183 Electric Road, at the corner with Oil Street, in the Fortress Hill area of North Point, in the Eastern District of Hong Kong. It stands across Oil Street from the former clubhouse of the Royal Hong Kong Yacht Club.

=== Features ===
The tower rises 44 floors and 180 metres (591 ft) in height, and stands as the 99th-tallest building in Hong Kong. The building was completed in 1999. It was designed by P & T Architects & Engineers Ltd. and Andrew Lee King Fun & Associates, and was developed by Henderson Land Development. The AIA Tower is composed entirely of commercial office space, and is an example of modern architecture. The tower has an in-house swimming pool and fitness centre.

=== Tenants ===
- AIA Wealth Select Centre, 12/F
- Glory Sky Group, 13/F
- University of Hong Kong School of Professional and Continuing Education (HKU SPACE), AIA Tower Learning Centre, 15/F & 18/F, removal in November 2015
- Abbott Laboratories, 20/F-21/F
- Henderson Land Development Office, 9/F, 14/F
- ROCCO Design Architects Limited, 38/F

== See also ==
- AIA Central
- List of tallest buildings in Hong Kong
