= Pau Toi Shan =

Pau Toi Shan may refer to:

- Fortress Hill, North Point, Hong Kong Island
- Devil's Peak, Hong Kong, between New Kowloon and New Territories near Lei Yue Mun
