= City Garden =

Housing estate in Fortress Hill, Hong Kong

Coordinates: 22.28637°N 114.19152°E

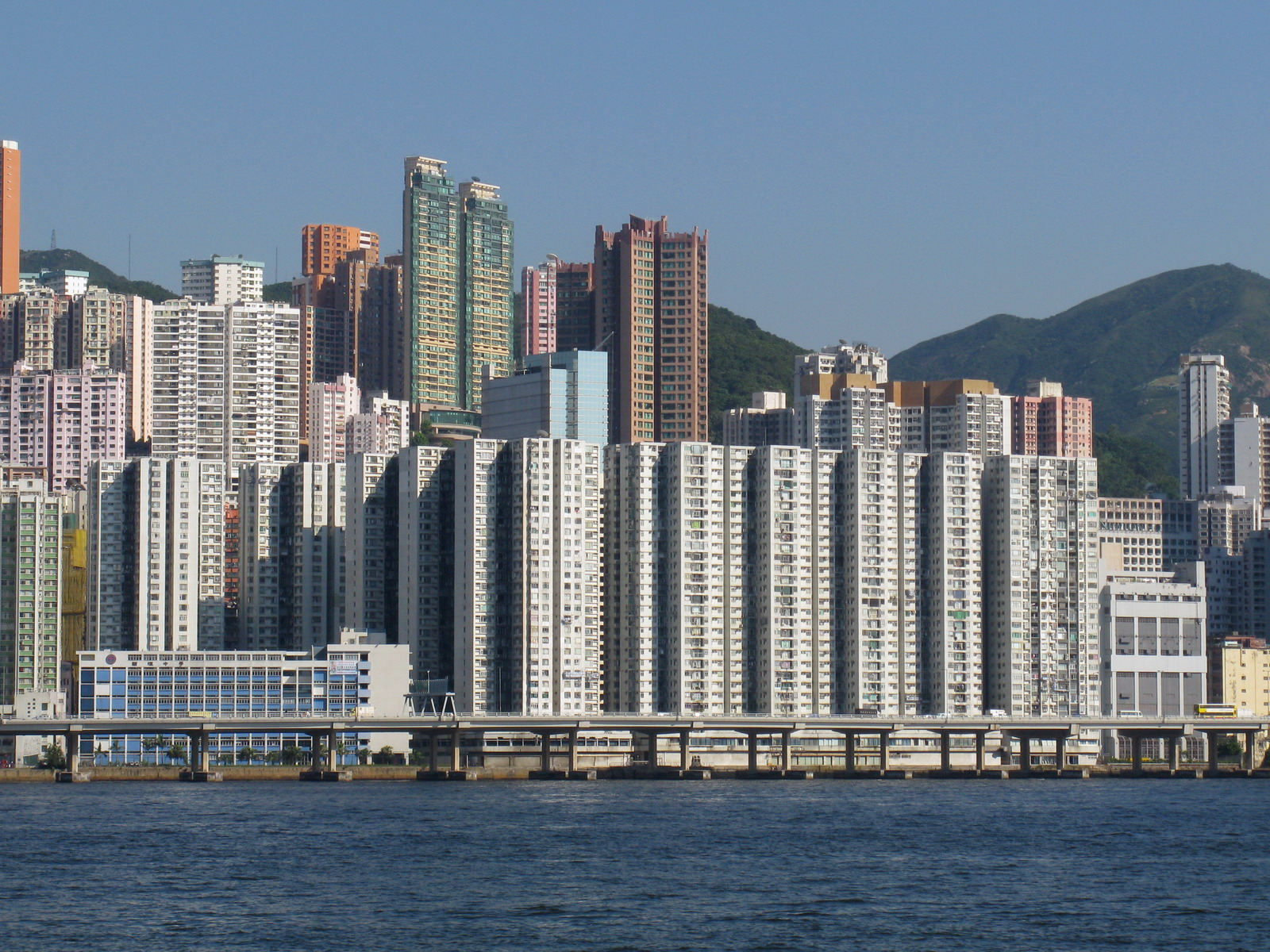
- View of City Garden and Fortress Hill from Victoria Harbour. The elevated road is the Island Eastern Corridor.
- Traditional Chinese: 城市花園
- Simplified Chinese: 城市花园
Transcriptions
Standard Mandarin
- Hanyu Pinyin: Chéngshì Hūayuán

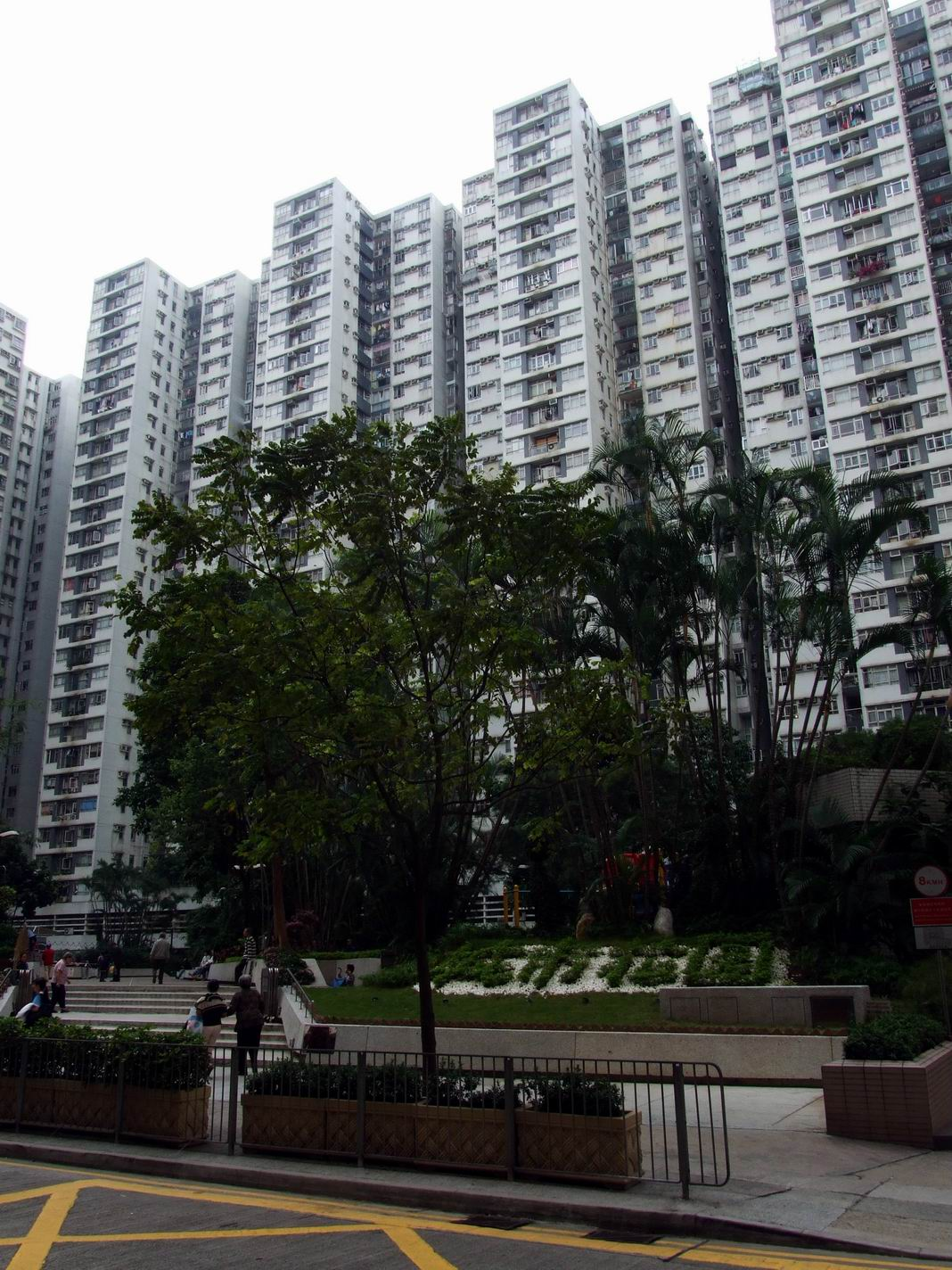
City Garden seen from City Garden Road

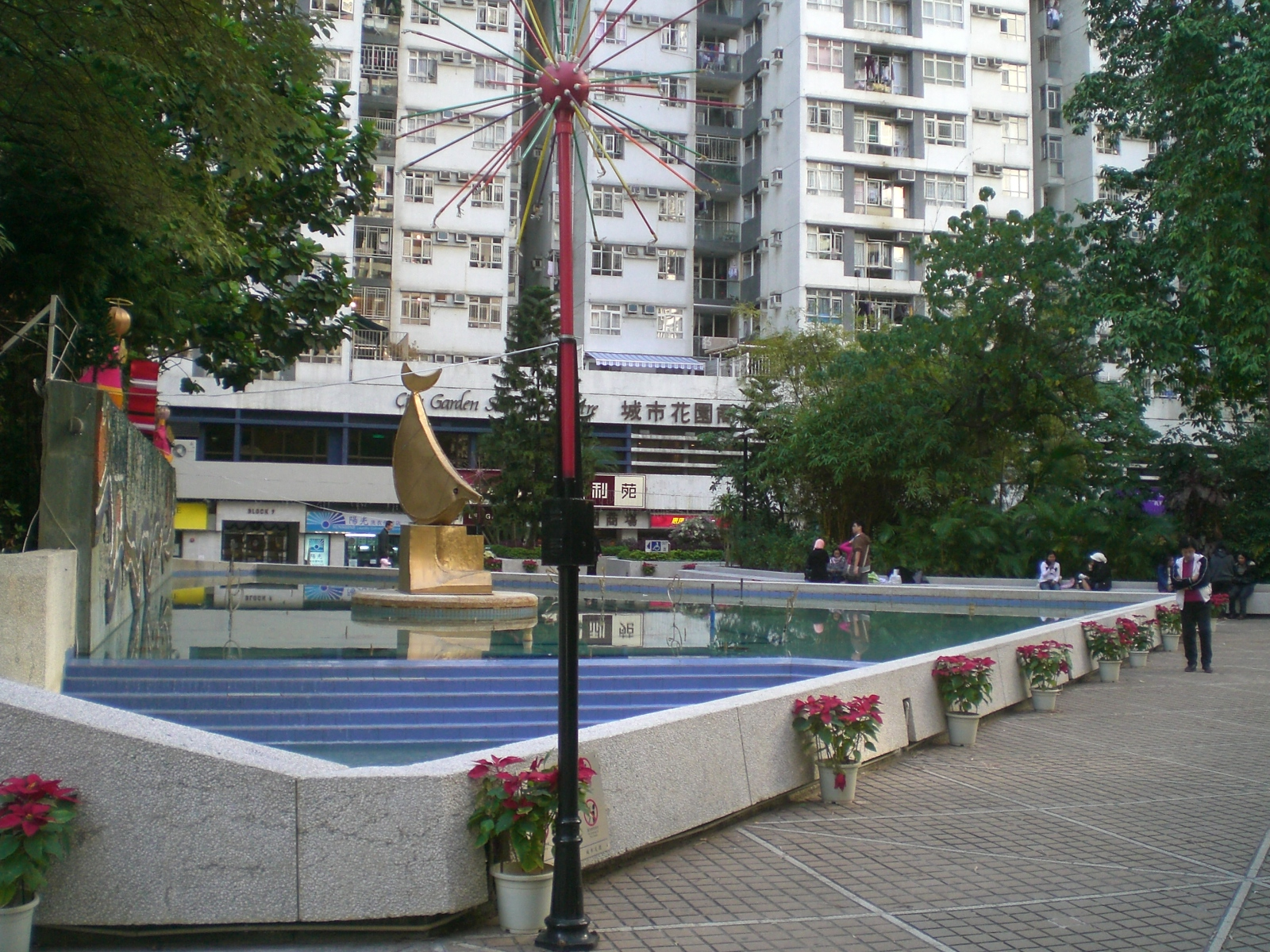
A public square within City Garden, with City Garden Shopping Centre in the background.

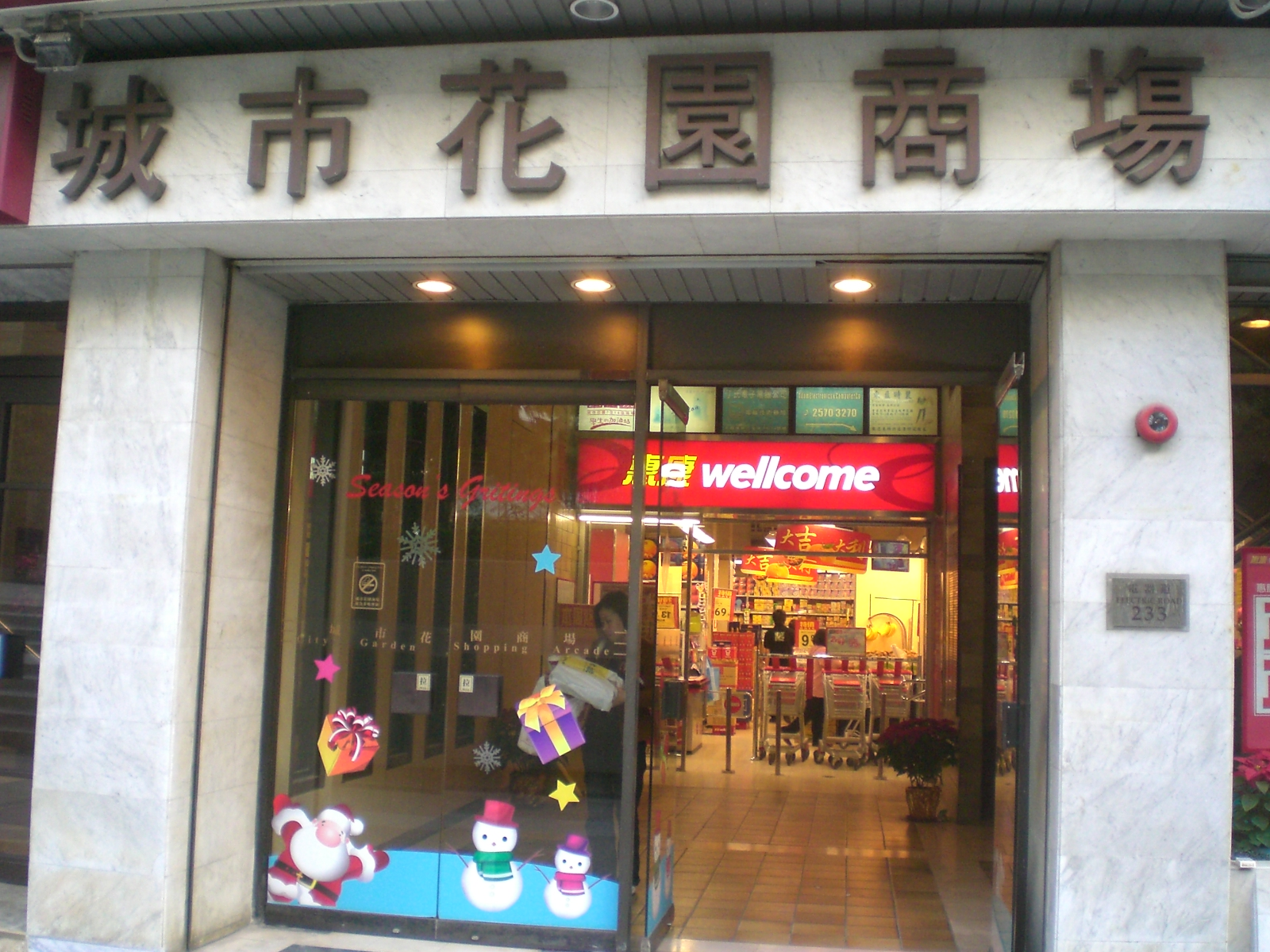
Wellcome supermarket within City Garden Shopping Centre.

City Garden is a private housing estate in Fortress Hill, Hong Kong. It was built from 1983 to 1986 by Cheung Kong Holdings Limited. It consists of 14 blocks, each 28 storeys tall. Part of the site was occupied by the North Point Power Station before 1983.

== Structure ==
City Garden is located at 233 Electric Road, Fortress Hill, Hong Kong. It is located beside Victoria Harbour. It consists of 14 residential buildings with 28 levels each. Phase 1 includes Block 1–6 while phase 2 includes Block 7–14. There are 2,393 residential units which accommodate more than 9,000 residents. City Garden's lot is approximately 400,000 square feet (37,000 m^{2}) in size. City Garden Road is a two-lane road which serves as the main thoroughfare through City Garden.

== Facilities ==
City Garden facilities include:

- 3-level basement carpark
- Park
- Residential club, which has an indoor swimming pool, a fitness room, squash courts, sauna room, and a guest club
- Shopping mall
- Wellcome supermarket
- City Garden Hotel, Hong Kong

== Security ==
Cayley Property Management Limited provides 24/7 security service for City Garden. Security guards are allocated at each residential building's lobby, the park and the basement carpark. A password, set by management, is needed to enter the residential buildings. As of 1 March 2007, a registered Octopus card can also function as entrance permit into the residential building.

== Transportation ==
MTR Exit B of Fortress Hill station, which is on the Island line is the MTR station for City Garden.

Tram Fortress Hill Road stop serves City Garden.

Bus

There are many bus routes, both local and cross-harbour, that service City Garden. They include,

- Routes: 2, 2A, 8H, 8S, 8X, 10, 18, 18P, 18X, 19, 19P, 23, 25, 25A, 27, 38, 41A, 42, 42C, 63, 65, 77, 81, 81P, 85A, 99, 102, 106, 110, 112, 116, 307P, 601, 603A, 619, 619X, 671, 678, 680, 680A, 680B, 680P, 690, 962E
- Overnight routes: N8, N8X, N72, N118, N122, N619, N680, N691, NA11
- Airport Bus: A11, Electric Road Market bus stop (18th) city-bound; Fortress Hill Station bus stop airport-bound
- Disneyland Resort route: R11, Electric Road Market bus stop (17th) city-bound; bus runs frequently after 8 pm; R8, Lantau Link Toll Plaza stop, interchange to A11, Electric Road Market bus stop (18th) for whole-day service

Mini-bus Mini-bus are another way of transportation. The routes that serve City Garden include 19S, 49M, 56, 69

Taxis The red taxi serve City Garden. There is a taxi stand beside City Garden Hotel.

== See also ==
- South Horizons, built on the site of the Ap Lei Chau Power Station
