= Tong Shui Road Public Pier =

Pier in Hong Kong

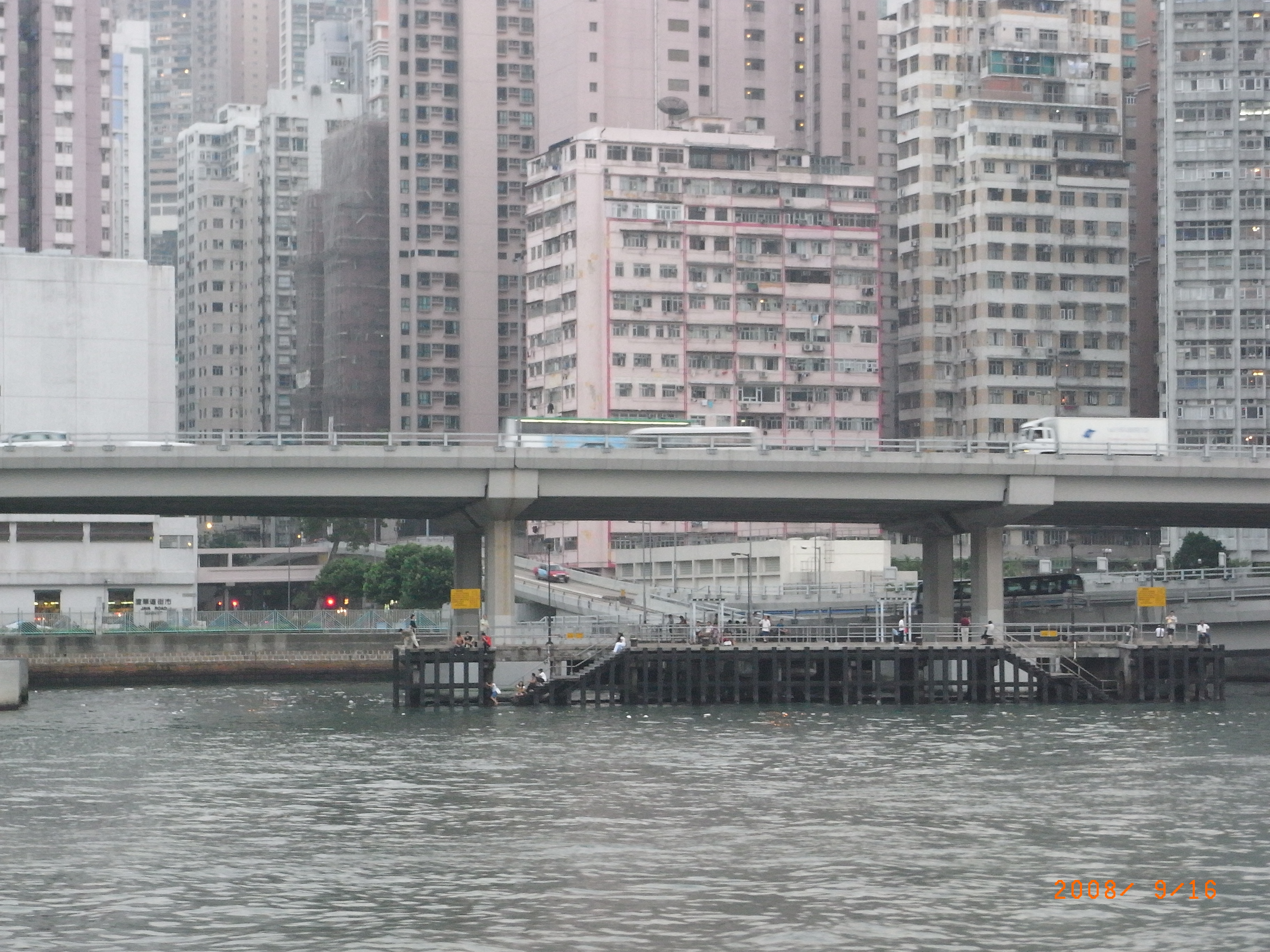
Tong Shui Road Pier

Tong Shui Road Public Pier (Chinese: 糖水道公眾碼頭) is a public pier in Tong Shui Road (Chinese: 糖水道), North Point, Hong Kong. It is located below Island Eastern Corridor near former North Point Estate and North Point Ferry Pier. It is usually used by government ships and boats. Many people go fishing in there. It is maintained by Civil Engineering and Development Department of the Hong Kong Government.
