= Tin Hau Food Square =

- 天后食坊
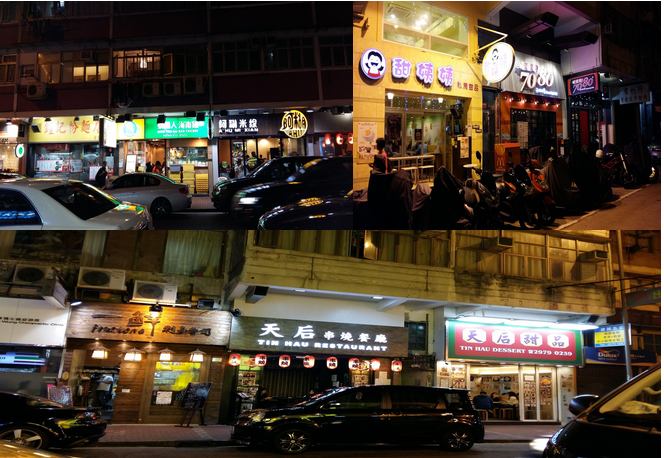

General information
- Location: Electric Road, Wing Hing Street, Tsing Fung Street

Tin Hau Food Square is a new food colony that has sprung up in recent years in Hong Kong. As the name implies, it is located between Tin Hau station and Fortress Hill station, on Electric Road, Wing Hing Street and Tsing Fung Street. There are around 150 restaurants in the square serving many different styles of cuisine, including Chinese, Western, Thai, Japanese, and Korean.

== History ==
=== Origin of the name ===
Originally known as Tin Hau Food Street, the word "street" was abandoned in favor of "square" by a district councilor who was concerned that confusion might arise from the absence of square, park, or food court in the area.

=== Origins ===
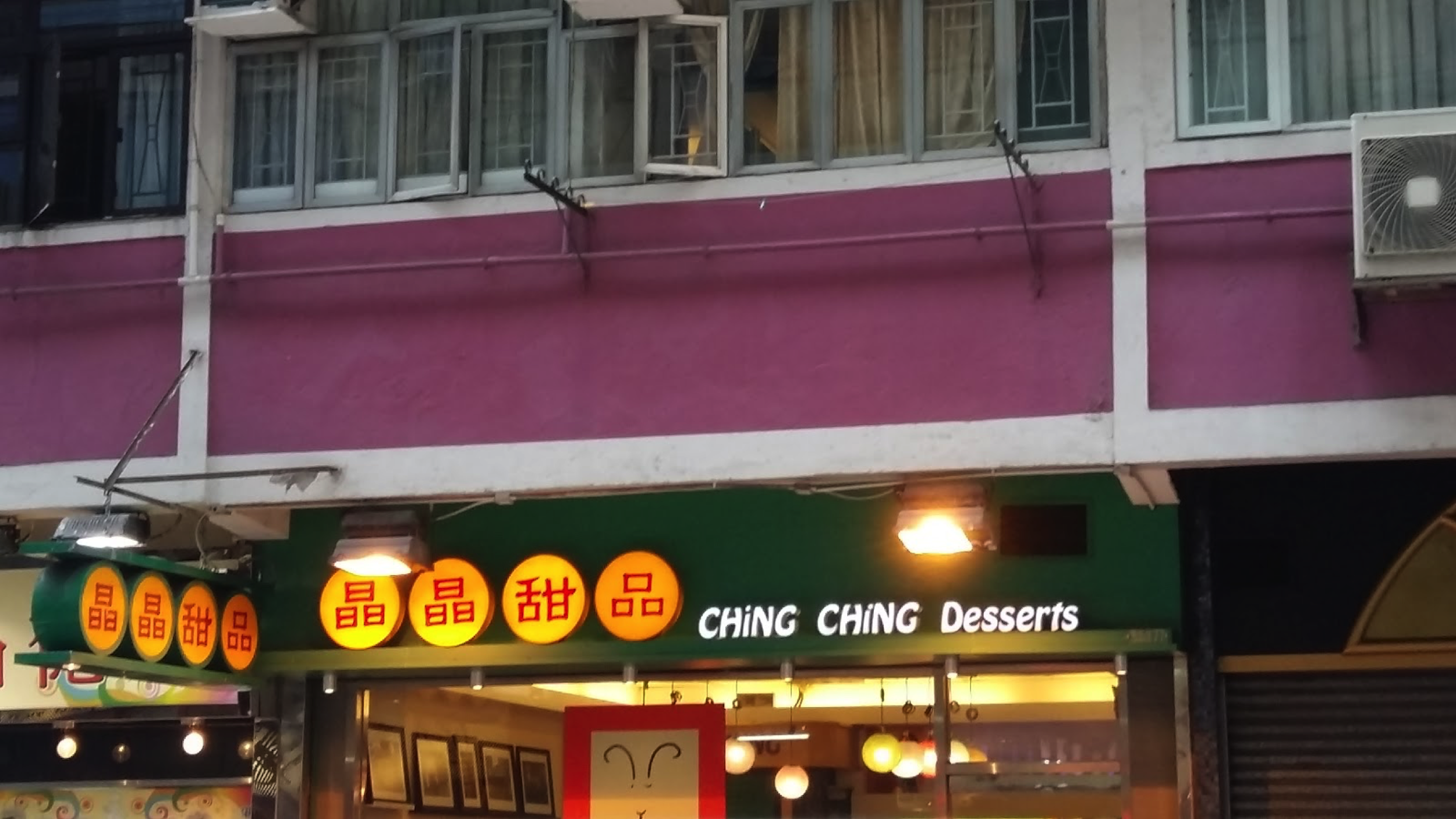
ChingChing Dessert in Tin Hau Food Square

Tin Hau Food Square was originally an ordinary residential area with very few restaurants. There were mostly stationery stores, hardware stores, pharmacies, bakeries, and Chinese grocery stores along Electric Road with garages and old furniture stores in the side streets, which include Tsing Fung Street and Lau Li Street. The person who initiated the catering business in Tin Hau, Mr. Wong, the owner of a Chinese dessert shop, opened his dessert shop, Ching Ching Dessert (Chinese: 晶晶甜品) twenty years ago after moving to Tin Hau. People could sit inside or outside the shop to enjoy their desserts, and customers with cars could simply park outside the shop. Over the past decade, people have chosen Tin Hau as a potential location to start their businesses based on the successful experience of Ching Ching Dessert.

=== Current development ===
Many hotels and apartments have been built near Tin Hau Food Square in recent years. Therefore, tourists and foreigners are another source of customers. People who are interested in opening restaurants in Causeway Bay have also recently begun shifting to Tin Hau, which has relatively lower rents. The large number of food stores makes Tin Hau Food Square attractive to people who go out for dinner, desserts, and late night meals (Chinese: 宵夜) throughout the whole year.

== Features ==
The most distinctive characteristic of the Food Square is its large number of dessert houses. There are not only traditional desserts such as dumplings and black sesame soup, but also learned and imported desserts from other countries in order to attract more customers. Most of the desserts use fruit and chocolate as their main ingredients, such as the Mango cream dumplings and chocolate soufflé, which are very popular among younger customers. Apart from desserts, foreign snacks such as fried chicken fillet from Taiwan are also common.

With the increasing number of food stores and their popularity among the people of Hong Kong people, the district councilors have decided to develop this area as a tourist attraction, using around $13,000,000 for beautification. Promotion via media and the insertion of flags and statues as a kind of landmark will also be included to boost tourism and maintain the unique features of the area.

== Challenges ==
=== High rents ===
One of the challenges for stores located in Tin Hau Food Square is the high rents. As a tourist spot, it promotes Hong Kong's characteristic street foods. This provides numerous opportunities in the business market, and it attracts business partners to consider opening other businesses such as international hotels and chain shops. This competition provided by large enterprises pushes the rent to a level that many local stores cannot afford. A local food store owner believes that the development project of Tin Hau Food Square has not helped them at all, instead creating higher rents, and more difficulties. As a result, independent food stores that represent local and characteristic culture are encountering more obstacles while the theme of street food market is fading away.

=== Tight regulation ===
Another challenge for the Food Square is the strict regulation of the local shops. Some are victims of insufficient land supply, a deep-rooted problem affecting development. Due to the shops' small area, shop owners have attempted to expand their business onto public space. However, this is often stopped by the patrolling of the Food and Environmental Hygiene Department. The shops do not want to face prosecution for unauthorized extension of their business' area by the department, which has a fixed penalty of $3000 to $6000, roughly three day's turnover for these shops.

== Transport ==
Transport to the Tin Hau Food square is convenient as it is near Victoria Park, just a few meters away from the busy Causeway Bay district. Visitors can arrive by MTR, getting off at either Tin Hau station or Fortress Hill station, or ride buses or even minibuses.
