= Electric Road =

Street on Hong Kong Island, Hong Kong

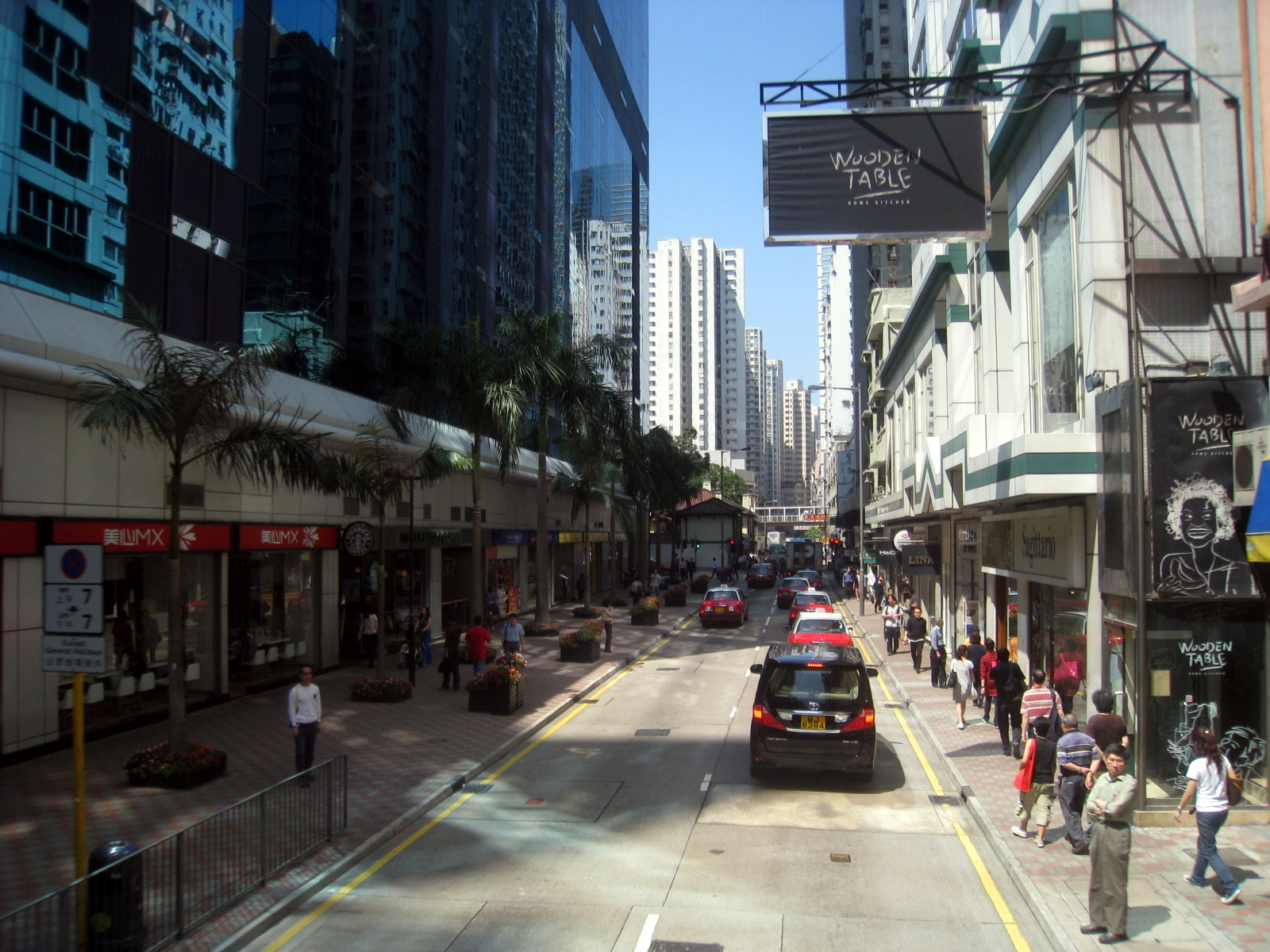
View of Electric Road, looking east, near AIA Tower.

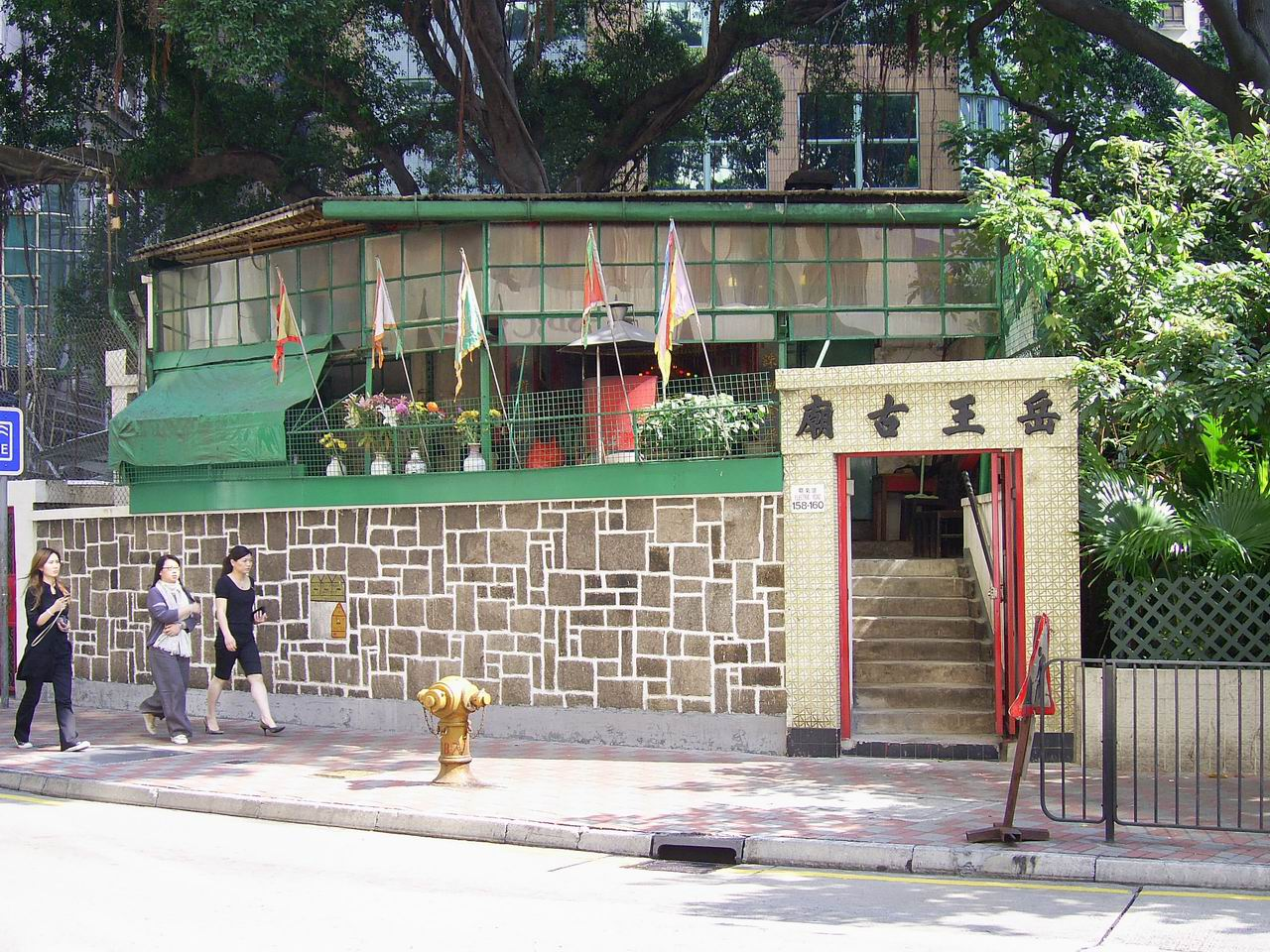
Ngo Wong Temple along Electric Road.

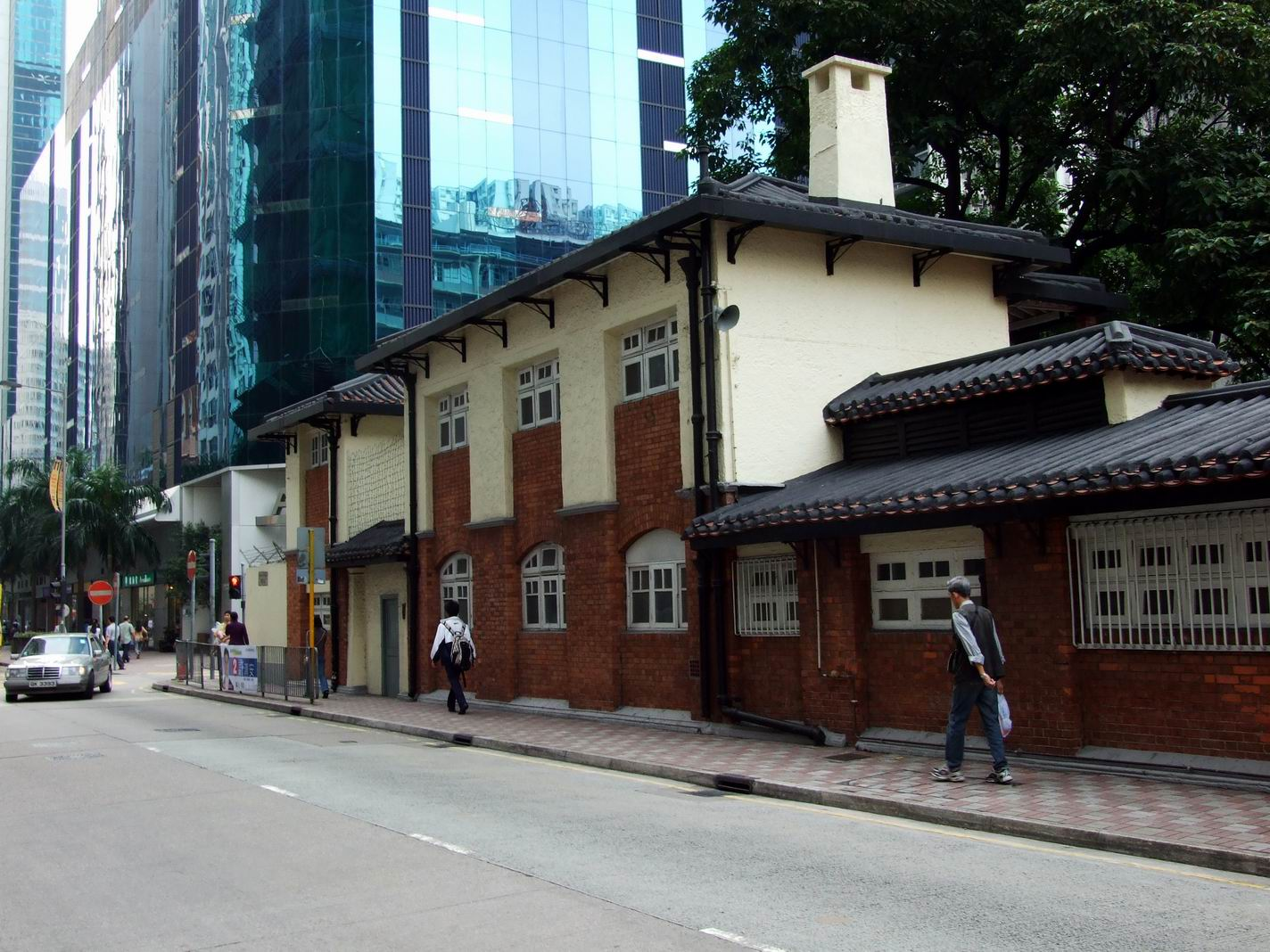
Oi! building, the former clubhouse of the Royal Hong Kong Yacht Club, along Electric Road.

Electric Road (Chinese: 電氣道) is a street in the north of Hong Kong Island in the Eastern District of Hong Kong. It spans from the Tin Hau area of Causeway Bay, across Fortress Hill of North Point and connects east onto Java Road in North Point.

== History ==
Electric Road remained unnamed when the Hong Kong Tramway was completed in 1904. In 1913, Hongkong Electric built a new power station on the new reclamation of North Point to replace the one in Wan Chai. Its operation was delayed until summer 1919 because of World War I. The operation of the power station spurred the development of North Point. In 1929 after the improvement of the road, it was named 'Electric Road' after the power station. Before the completion of King's Road, it was the busiest road in North Point.

North Point Power Station was officially decommissioned in 1978. The site is now part of the large scale City Garden housing development.

== Features ==
- Nos. 89 and 91 Electric Road are two tong lau built between 1947 and 1951
- Causeway Bay Market (No. 142)
- Ngo Wong Temple (岳王古廟) (No. 158-160)
- @Convoy (No 169)
- AIA Tower (No. 183)
- Former Royal Hong Kong Yacht Club clubhouse
- North Point Fire Station
- Towngas Headquarters
- Hong Kong Funeral Home
- North Point Government Office
- Electric Road Municipal Services Building (No. 229)
- Kodak House
- City Garden, a private residential development (No. 233)
- Sea View Estate
- Tin Hau Food Square

== See also ==
- List of streets and roads in Hong Kong
