= Causeway Road =

Road in Hong Kong

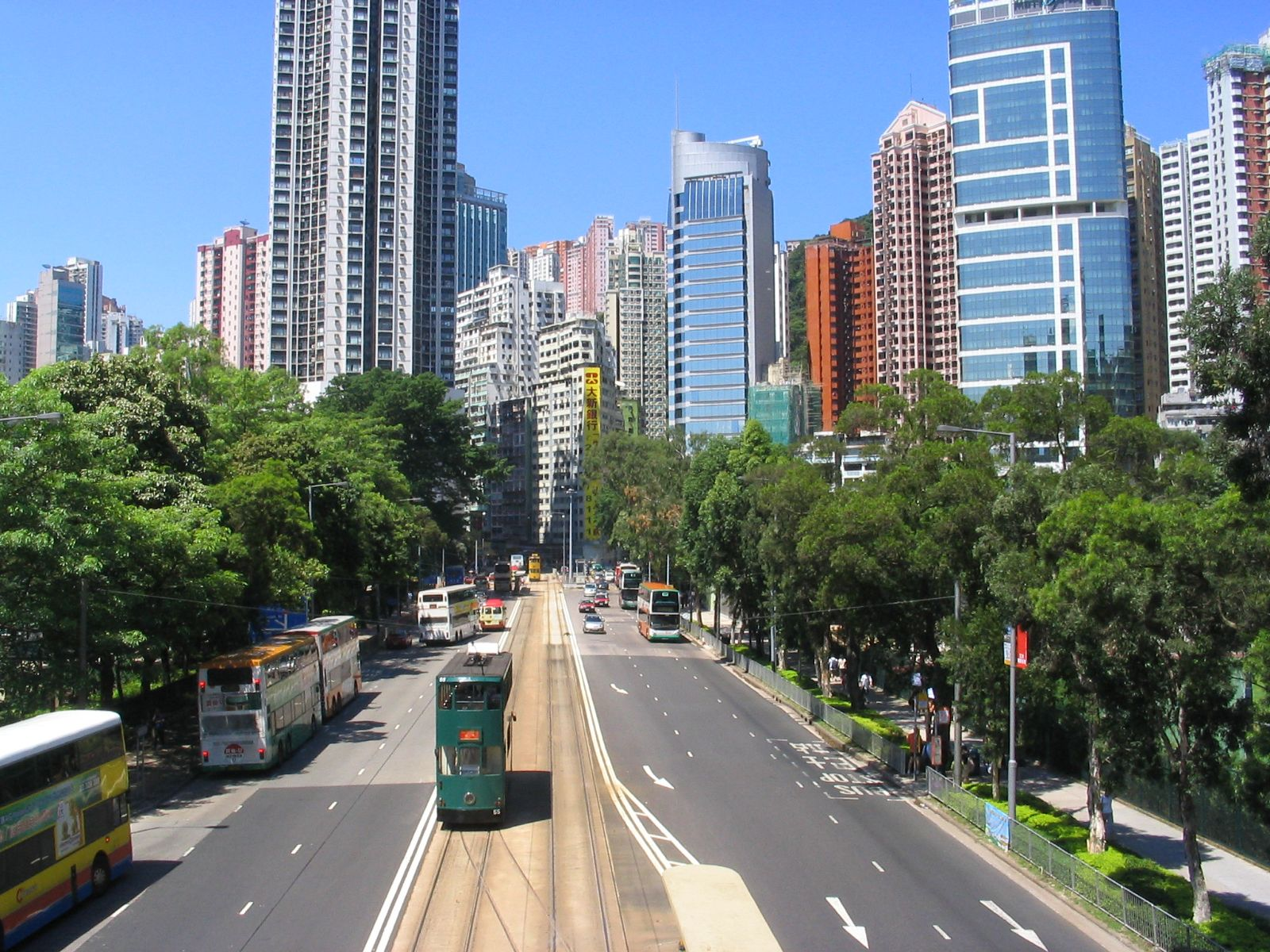
- Causeway Road, looking northeast towards King's Road
- Interactive map of Causeway Road
- Native name: 高士威道 (Yue Chinese)
- Location: Causeway Bay, Hong Kong
- Coordinates: 22.2811°N 114.1899°E

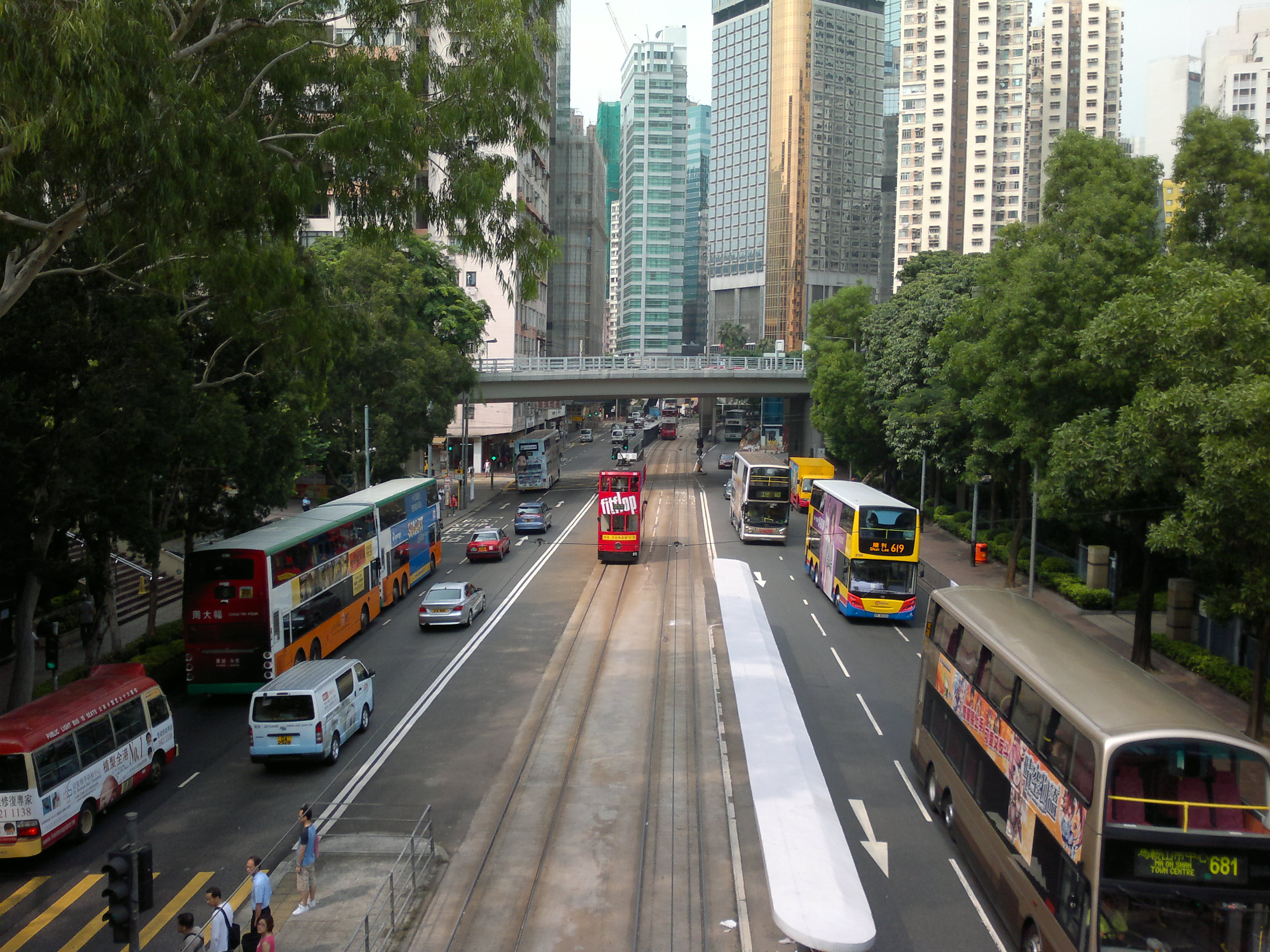
Causeway Road looking toward Causeway Bay

Causeway Road (Chinese: 高士威道; Cantonese Yale: gou1 si6 wai1 dou6) is a main road in Hong Kong. Located in Causeway Bay, it connects Yee Wo Street and Irving Street in the west with King's Road in the east, and passes under the Gloucester Road and Moreton Terrace flyovers. The road marks the boundary between the Eastern District and Wan Chai District. Victoria Park occupies the northern section of the road in the Eastern District, whilst Queen's College and the Hong Kong Central Library are located on the southern side of the road in Wan Chai.

== History ==
Causeway Road evolved from a causeway (hence its name) which connected both sides of Causeway Bay (Tung Lo Wan; 銅鑼灣 in Cantonese) until the early 1880s. In 1883, the Hong Kong Government reclaimed the bay, and the causeway was rebuilt as a coastal road, and named Causeway Road. It became the only means of travelling from the Eastern District to Central.

Its Cantonese name 高士威道 (ko sze wai dou) is a transliteration of the English word 'causeway'. Between 1951 and 1953, the typhoon shelter on the northern side of the road was reclaimed for the creation of Victoria Park.

== Features ==
- Causeway Bay Sports Ground (銅鑼灣運動場)
- Hong Kong Central Library
- Queen's College
- Victoria Park
- There are 3 tram stops along the road: Shelter Street Stop; Victoria Park Stop; Hing Fat Street Stop

== See also ==
- List of streets and roads in Hong Kong
