= Tong Shui Road =

Road in North Point, Hong Kong

Coordinates: 22°17′31″N 114°11′55″E

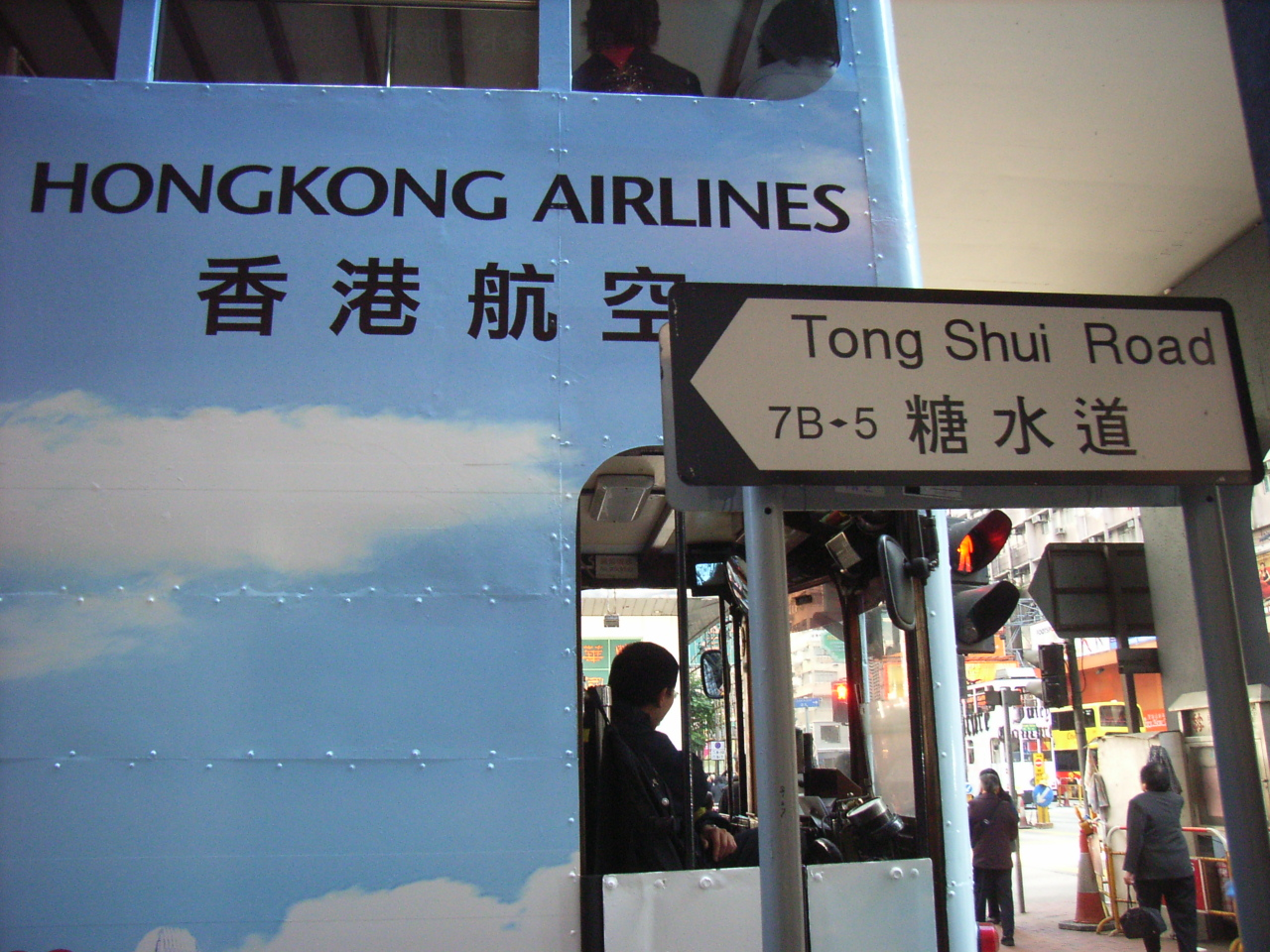
The tram station at Tong Shui Road

Tong Shui Road (Chinese: 糖水道) is a road on reclaimed land in North Point on Hong Kong Island. The road runs from Victoria Harbour at its northern end to a T-junction with King's Road in the south. An exit slip road from the Island Eastern Corridor merges into and is named for Tong Shui Road. The North Point terminus of Hong Kong Tramways lies in the road, at the end of the adjoining Chun Yeung Street, home to North Point Market. Tong Shui Road Public Pier extends from the road's northern end, near Hotel Vic, on the site of the former North Point Estate.

== History ==
Tong Shui in Chinese means sugar water. It was associated with Sugar King Kwok Chun Yeung (郭春秧; Kwik Djoen Eng in Hokkien) in the early 20th century. He had planned to build a sugar refinery on (two) plots of land he reclaimed, immediately to the west of today's Tong Shui Road. When the reclamation was completed, the sugar price dropped drastically, so he cancelled the plan and built a residential block instead. Also named after him within the reclaimed area is Chun Yeung Street (春秧街). Nearby Java Road is so named for the source of his sugar.

== See also ==
- List of streets and roads in Hong Kong
