= North Point Power Station =

Former power station in North Point, Hong Kong

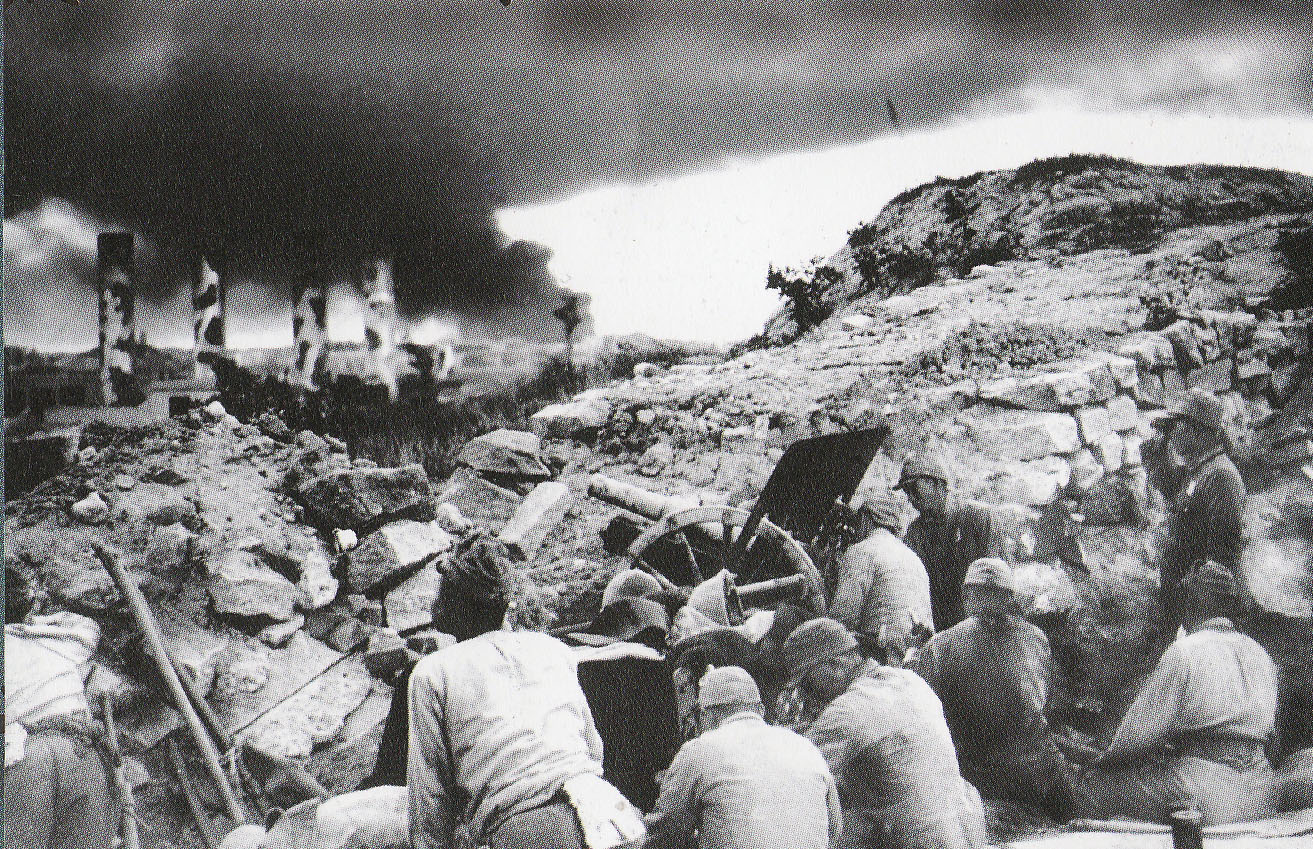
- Japanese troops of the 10th Independent artillery brigade attack North Point. 1941.
- Country: Hong Kong
- Location: North Point
- Coordinates: 22°17′25″N 114°11′37″E
- Status: Decommissioned
- Construction began: 1913
- Commission date: 1919
- Decommission date: 1978
- Owner: Hongkong Electric

Thermal power station
- Primary fuel: Coal
- Secondary fuel: Town gas

Power generation
- Nameplate capacity: 34 MW (46,000 hp) (1966)

External links
- Commons: Related media on Commons

North Point Power Station (Chinese: 北角發電廠) was a power station in Hong Kong located on Electric Road in North Point and near Fortress Hill, to the west side of where the City Garden housing estate is now located. It was built to replace the inadequate Wan Chai Power StationWan Chai Power Station and was owned and operated by Hongkong Electric.

== History ==
North Point was chosen as the location for the new power station because at the time of construction it was a long way from the Hong Kong urban area of Victoria City. The project began in 1913 but due to the outbreak of World War I the plant did not become operational until the summer of 1919.

On commissioning the plant had a total generating capacity of around 3 megawatts (4,000 hp). The road in front of the site was renamed Electric Road while the presence of the plant gave nearby "Power Street" (大強街) its name.

=== Battle of Hong Kong ===
In 1941, during the Battle of Hong Kong just prior to the Japanese occupation of Hong Kong the plant was severely damaged during artillery and aerial bombardment. The battle of the North Point Power station occurred shortly after the Japanese troops landed on the North Point shore and tried to push through towards Wan Chai. The plant was hastily defended by members of the Hong Kong Volunteer Defence Corps, Punjab Regiment and stragglers from the Middlesex Machine Gun Unit in Hong Kong. The Power station was taken after fierce fighting, and a platoon of Hong Kong Volunteer Defence Corps Armoured Cars attempted a counter-attack. However, all the armoured cars received hits from Japanese artillery and armoured weapons. All members of the platoon died except for a Lieutenant who managed to escape. Casualties from the battle included the plant's manager Vincent Sorby, who later died in a prison camp of wounds received during the attack. After the war, the plant was repaired and extended several times to cope with growing electricity demand in 1950s Hong Kong. By 1966 its output had reached 34 megawatts (46,000 hp).

=== Later history and decommissioning ===
At 10:26 am on the morning of 25 March 1977, a fire broke out at the plant causing power cuts on Hong Kong Island stretching from Central to Shau Kei Wan. The fire originated in a cable terminating room on the ground floor and was fuelled by a large quantity of oil-filled cables and cable oil. Traffic ground to a halt owing to disabled traffic lights and trams. The fire was put out by 12:57 pm.

Aside from the above incident, except for during its early years and because of wartime damage, only two blackouts occurred at North Point during its operational lifetime. One was caused by a fire at the plant in 1930 and the other occurred when a shoal of fish were sucked into the cooling system the same year.

As Hong Kong developed, North Point Power Station was gradually assimilated into the urban area. In 1968, the plant's adverse effect on the local environment led to Hong Kong Electric building a new power station at Ap Lei Chau. North Point was officially decommissioned in 1978. The former power station is now part of the large scale City Garden housing development.

== See also ==
- List of power stations in Hong Kong
