= King's Road, Hong Kong =

Road in Eastern District, Hong Kong

Coordinates: 22°17′06″N 114°13′05″E

King's Road
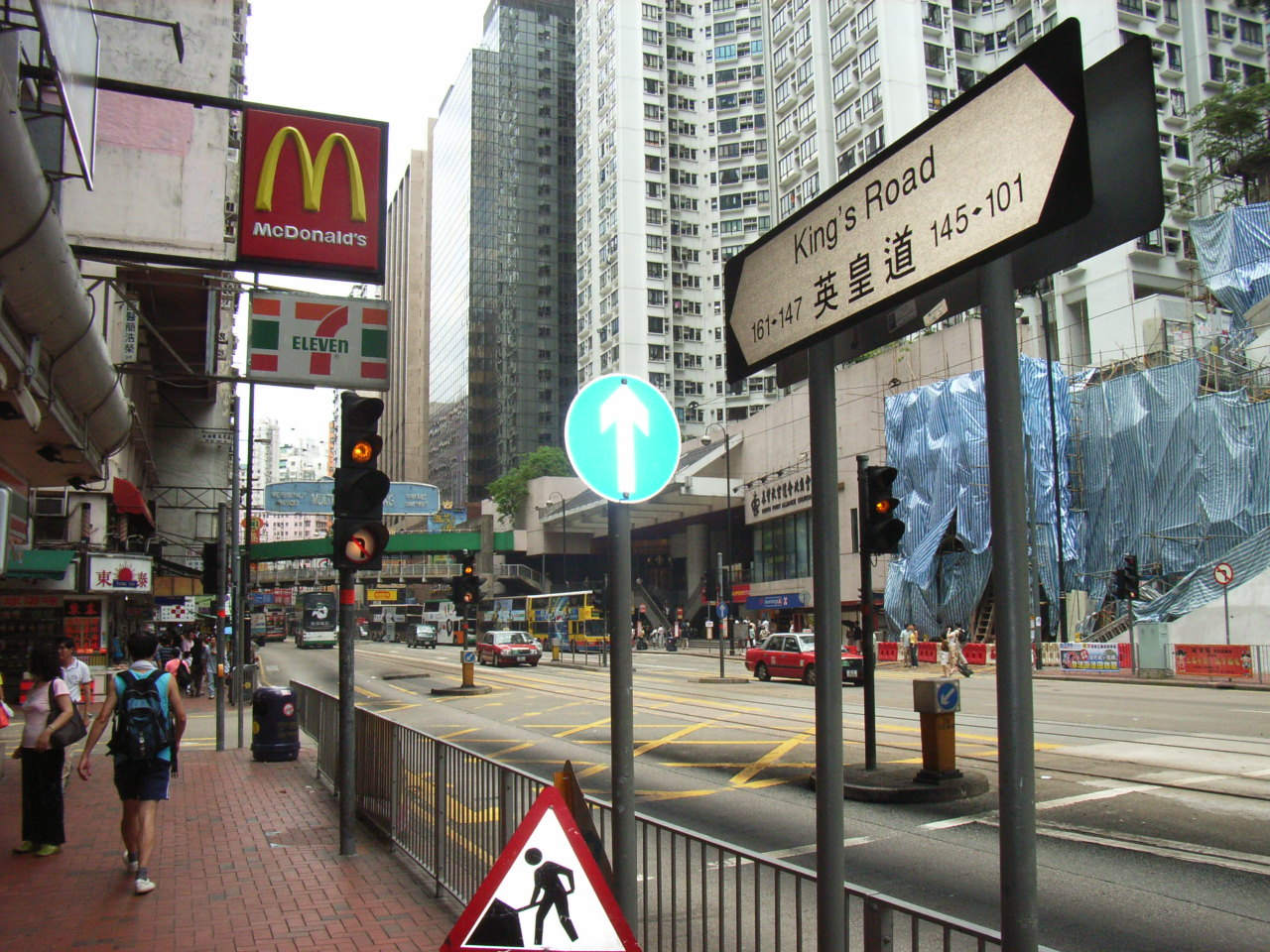
- Fortress Hill section of King's Road
- Interactive map of King's Road
- Native name: 英皇道 (Yue Chinese)
- Former name: Shaukiwan Road
- Namesake: King George V
- Length: 4.2 kilometres (2.6 mi)
- Location: Eastern District, Hong Kong
- East end: Causeway Road / Hing Fat Road
- West end: Shau Kei Wan Road / Tai Koo Shing Road

King's Road
- Chinese: 英皇道
Transcriptions
Standard Mandarin
- Hanyu Pinyin: Yīnghuáng Dào
Yue: Cantonese
- Yale Romanization: ying1 wong4 dou6

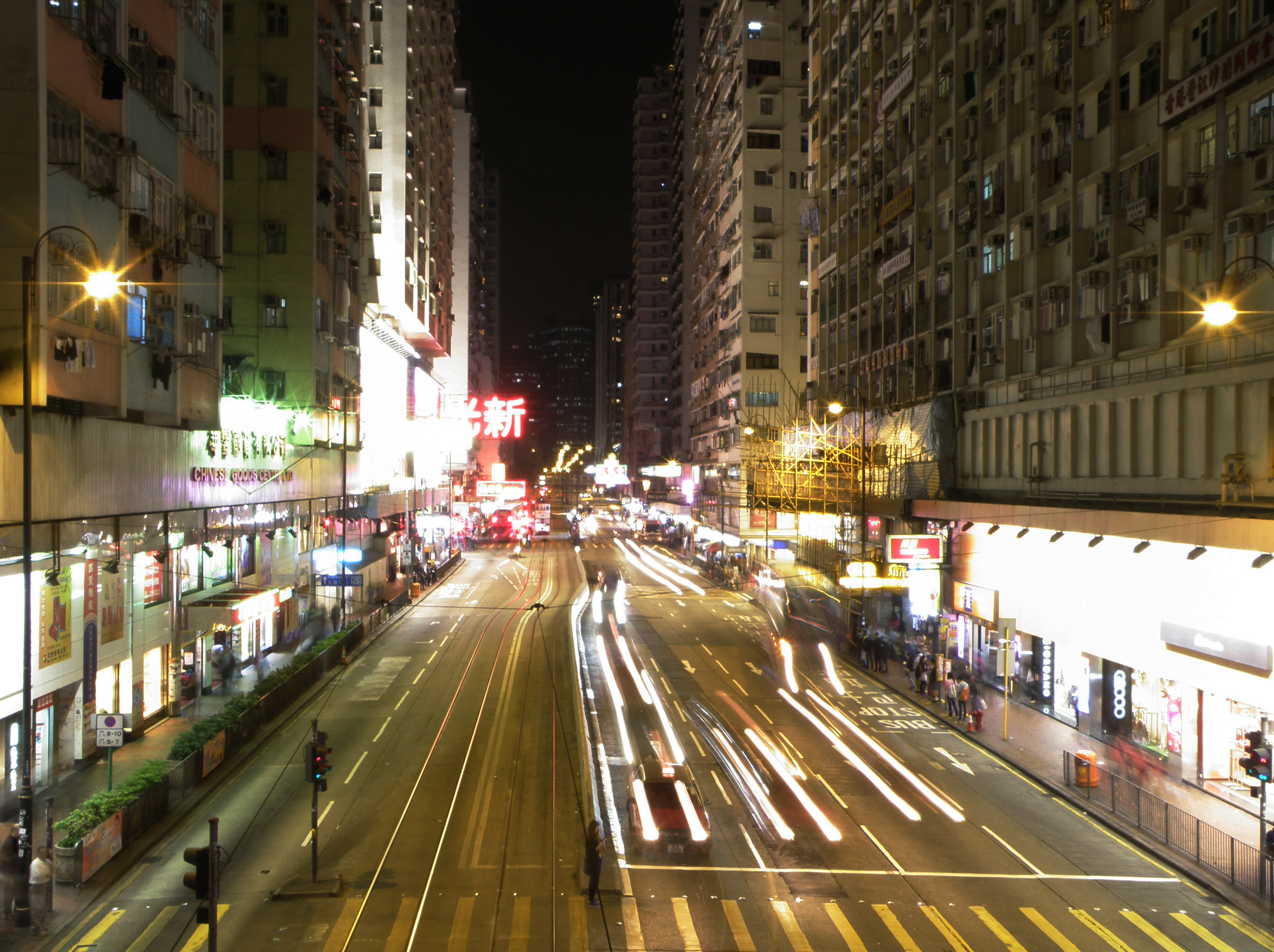
Night view of King's Road

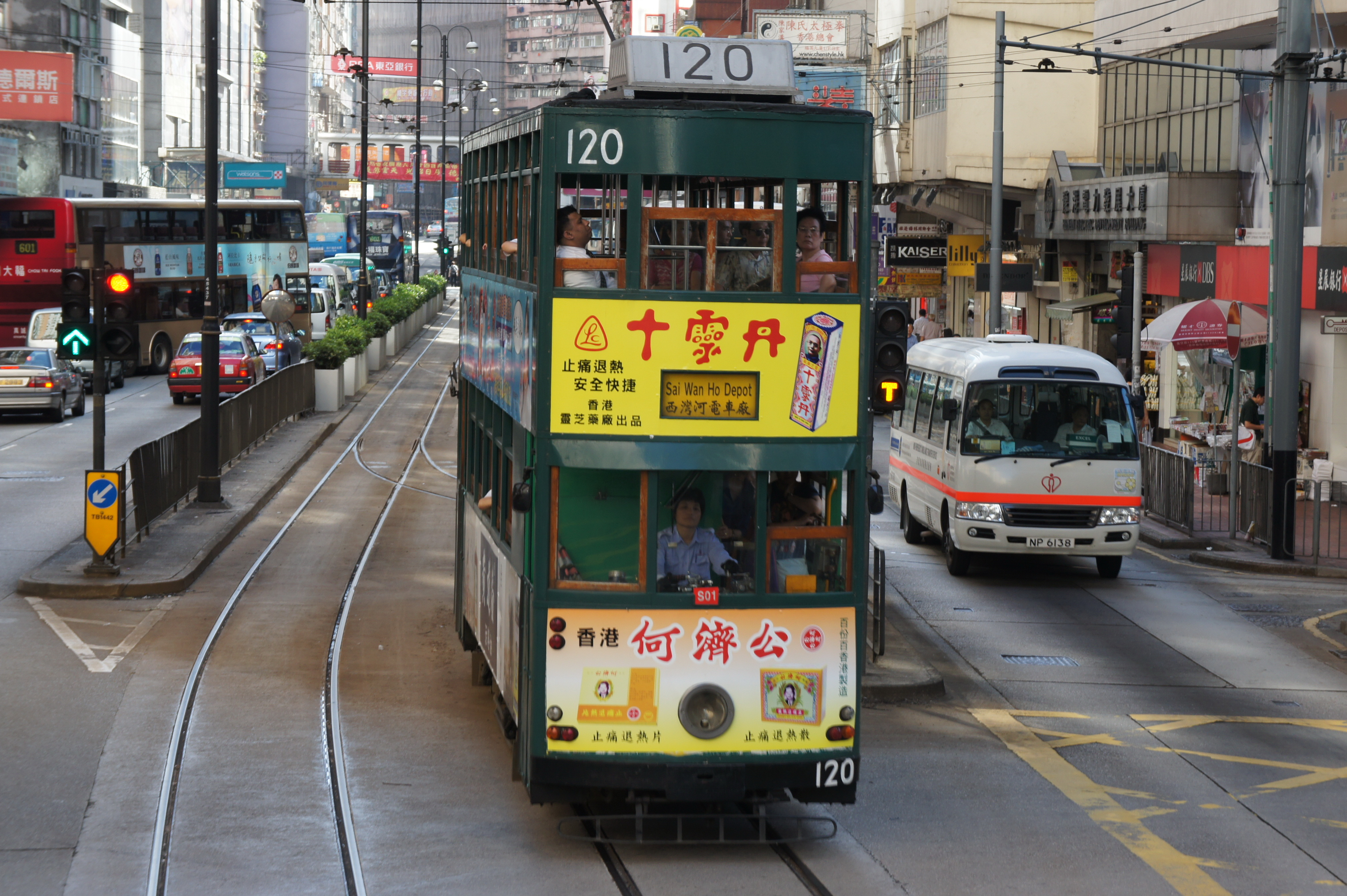
Tram in the North Point section of King's Road

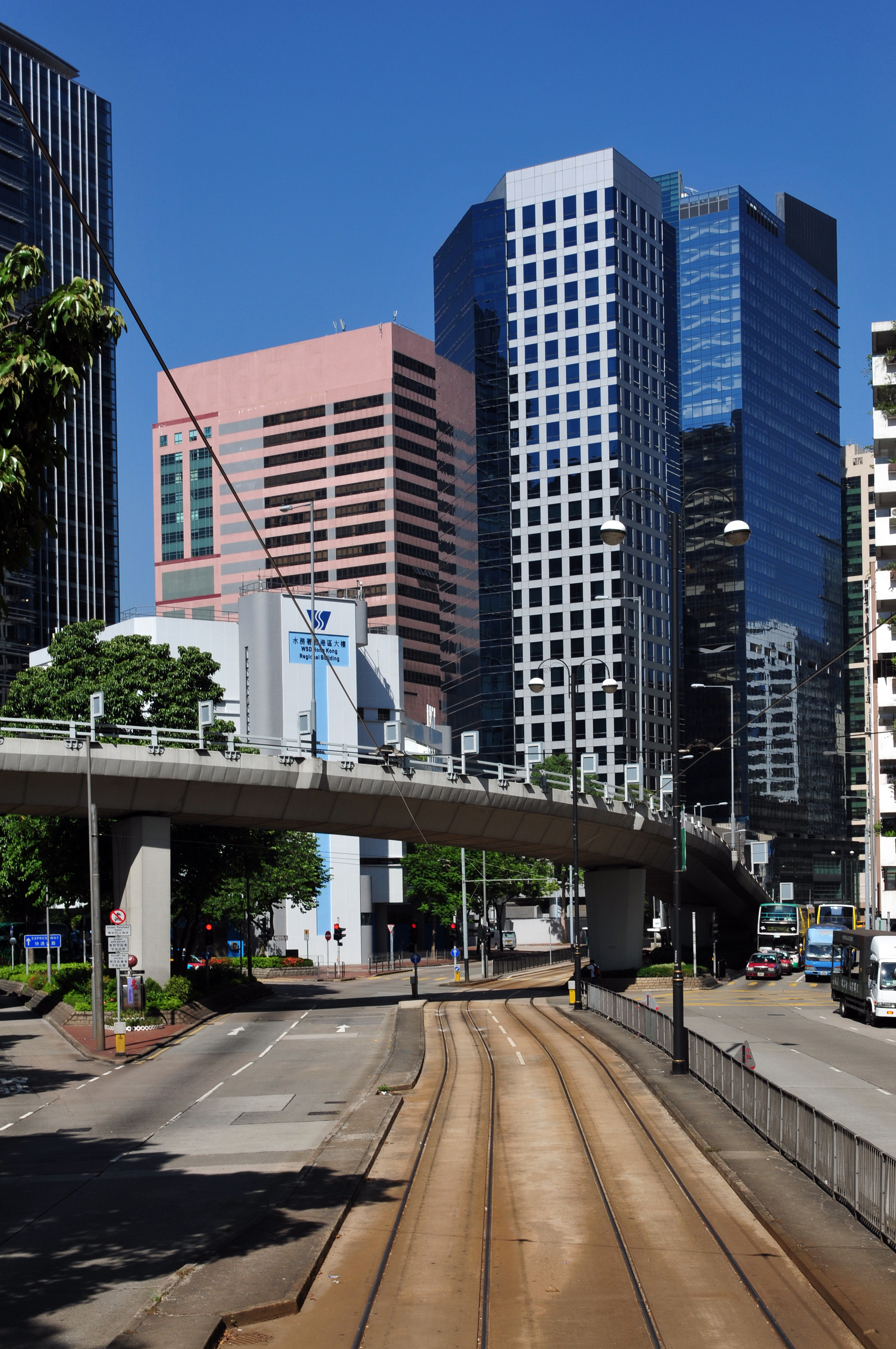
King's Road, at the junction between North Point and Quarry Bay

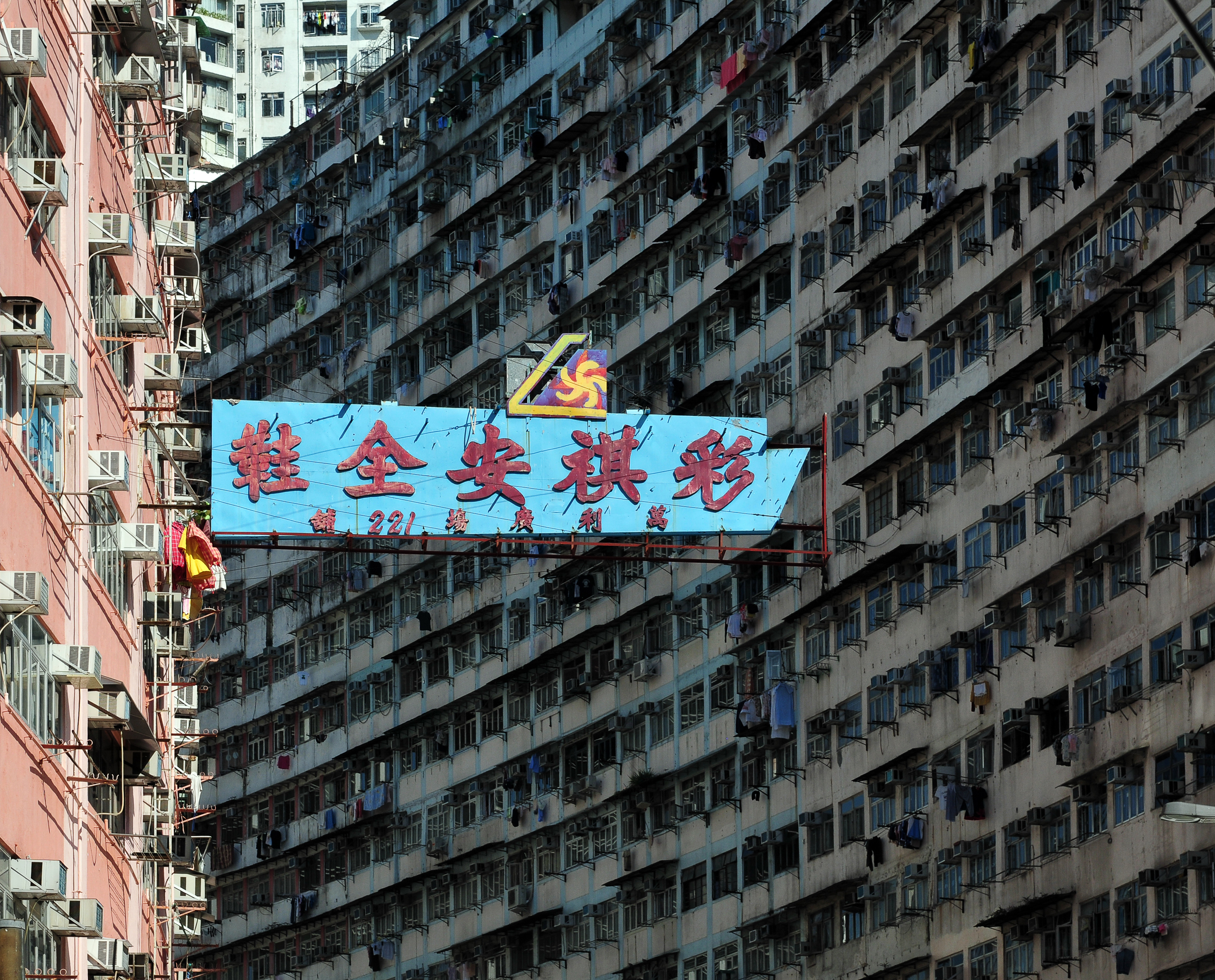
Fook Cheong Building (福昌樓) in the Quarry Bay section of King's Road

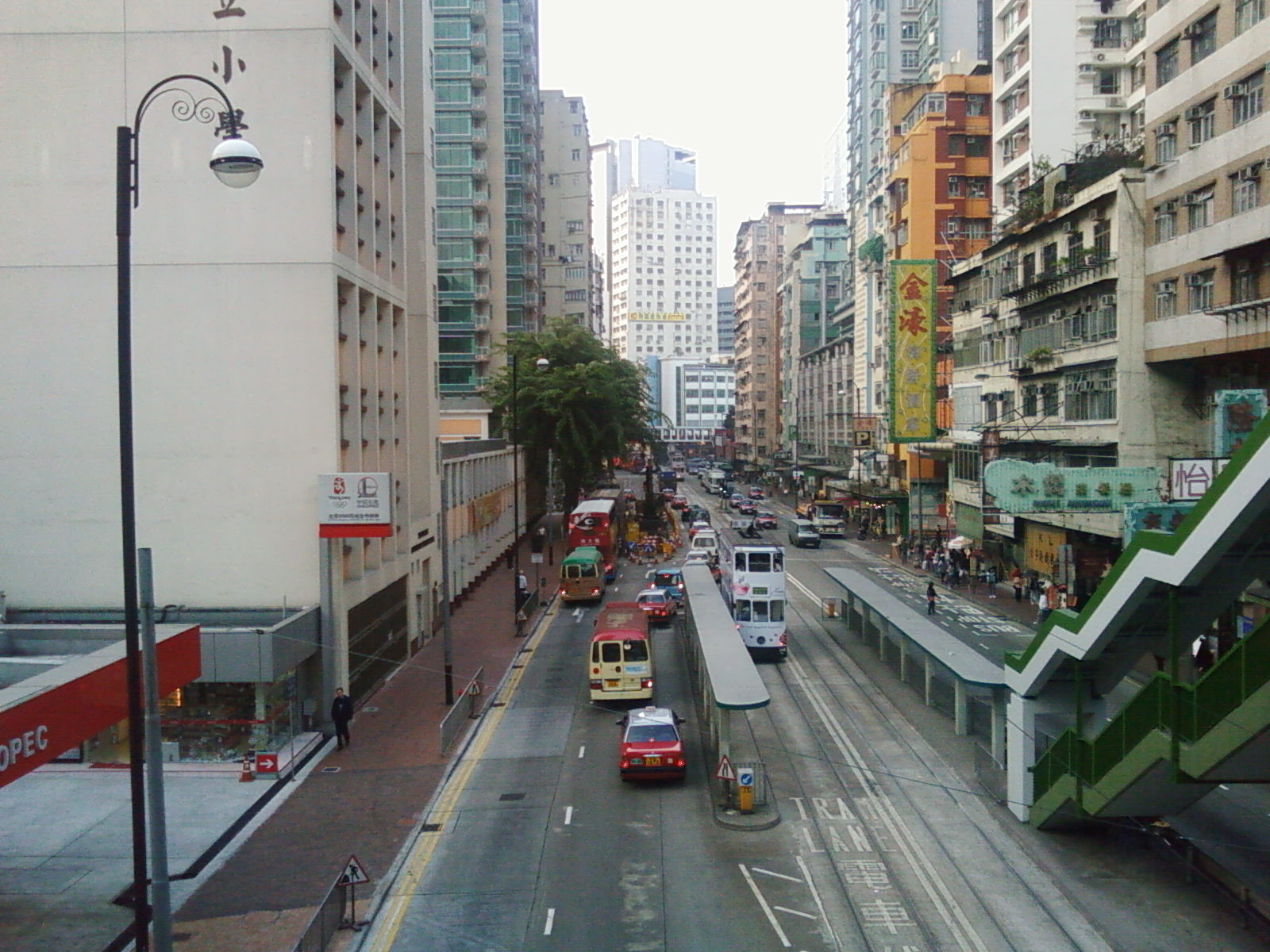
Quarry Bay section of King's Road. North Point Government Primary School is on the left.

King's Road (Chinese: 英皇道; Jyutping: jing1 wong4 dou6) is a major east–west road along the north of Hong Kong Island, Hong Kong, stretching from Causeway Bay (Tin Hau), where it joins Causeway Road, to Sai Wan Ho, where it joins Shau Kei Wan Road.

== History ==
Originally part of Shaukiwan Road, it was renamed in 1935 in honour of the Silver Jubilee of King George V's reign.

== Features ==
From west to east.
In Tin Hau:

- No. 1: Park Towers

In North Point:

- No. 238-240: Fortress Towers and C&MA North Point Church
- No. 277-291: Former State Theatre
- No. 423: Sunbeam Theatre
- Note that The boundary between North Point and Quarry Bay is at Man Hong Street / Healthy Street West

In Quarry Bay:

- No. 611: WSD Hong Kong Regional Building
- No. 668-702: Healthy Village
- No. 740-774: Model Housing Estate
- No. 888: North Point Government Primary School
- No.979-981: Taikoo Place
- No. 986: The Former Quarry Bay School is a Grade III historic building. Currently vacant, it was built in 1924–1926.
- No. 1032-1044: Fook Cheong Building (福昌樓)
- No. 1048-1056: Yick Fat Building (益發大廈). Housing the Hong Kong Aquarium Plaza.
- No. 1111: Cityplaza (太古城中心)

== Traffic ==
The road is shared between automobile traffic and the Hong Kong Tramways system, and the east bound of the section between eastern Causeway Bay and Quarry Bay bus lane. This tram line runs between Shau Kei Wan to Kennedy Town. Before the opening of Island Eastern Corridor and Island line of the MTR in the 1980s, the road was plagued with traffic congestion. Various measures like creation of bus lanes were taken to address the problem.

Part of the MTR Island line runs underneath the road, and the following stations serve the road: Tin Hau (exit A1), Fortress Hill (exits A and B), North Point (exits B1/B2/B3), Quarry Bay (exit A), Tai Koo.

== Incidents ==
=== North Point School Bus Crash ===
At 13:50 HKT on 10th December, 2018, a school bus parked on Cheung Hong St. near the gates of North Point Methodist Primary School slid down Cheung Hong Street, crossing through King's Rd and into Hei Wo Street, crashing into the Empire Apartments Building on King's Road. The incident resulted in the 4 deaths and 11 injuries. It was believed to have been caused by a mechanical malfunction or driver error, with the handbrakes not having been engaged.

=== Citybus Route 82 Bus Fire ===
At 13:00 HKT on 5th December, 2023, a Citybus Route 82 bus bound for Island Resort at Siu Sai Wan travelling on King's Rd East opposite to Pan Hoi Street near Taikoo Place went up in flames after the rear engine billowed with thick smoke. Firefighters responded to the scene, having extinguished the fire at 13:57 HKT, no one was injured in the incident.

== Intersecting streets ==
Roads are listed west to east.

- Causeway Road, Tung Lo Wan Road and Tin Hau Temple Road – Tin Hau Station is located here.
- Ngan Mok Street and Lau Sin Street
- Lau Li Street
- Tsing Fung Street
- Wing Hing Street
- Mercury Street
- Jupiter Street
- Shell Street
- Comfort Terrace
- Oil Street – Fortress Hill Station is located here.
- Boat Street
- Fortress Hill Road and Power Street
- Tin Chong Street
- Cheung Hong Street and Hei Wo Street
- North Point Road, Hong Kong and North View Street
- Ming Yuen Western Street
- Tong Shui Road
- Kam Ping Street
- Shu Kuk Street – North Point Station is located here.
- Kam Hong Street
- Tin Chiu Street
- Healthy Street West and Man Hong Street
- Healthy Street Central
- Healthy Street East
- Model Lane
- Java Road
- Mansion Street
- Finnie Street
- Tong Chong Street – Quarry Bay Station is located here.
- Pan Hoi Street
- Mount Parker Road and Quarry Bay Street
- Westlands Road
- Yau Man Street
- Greig Road and Shipyard Lane
- Kornhill Road and Hong On Street – Tai Koo Station is located here.
- Tai Koo Shing Road and Shau Kei Wan Road

== See also ==
- List of streets and roads in Hong Kong
