= Fortress Hill =

Hill in Hong Kong

Coordinates: 22.28858°N 114.19417°E

- Traditional Chinese: 炮台山
Transcriptions
Standard Mandarin
- Hanyu Pinyin: Pàotáishān
Yue: Cantonese
- Jyutping: paau3 toi4 saan1

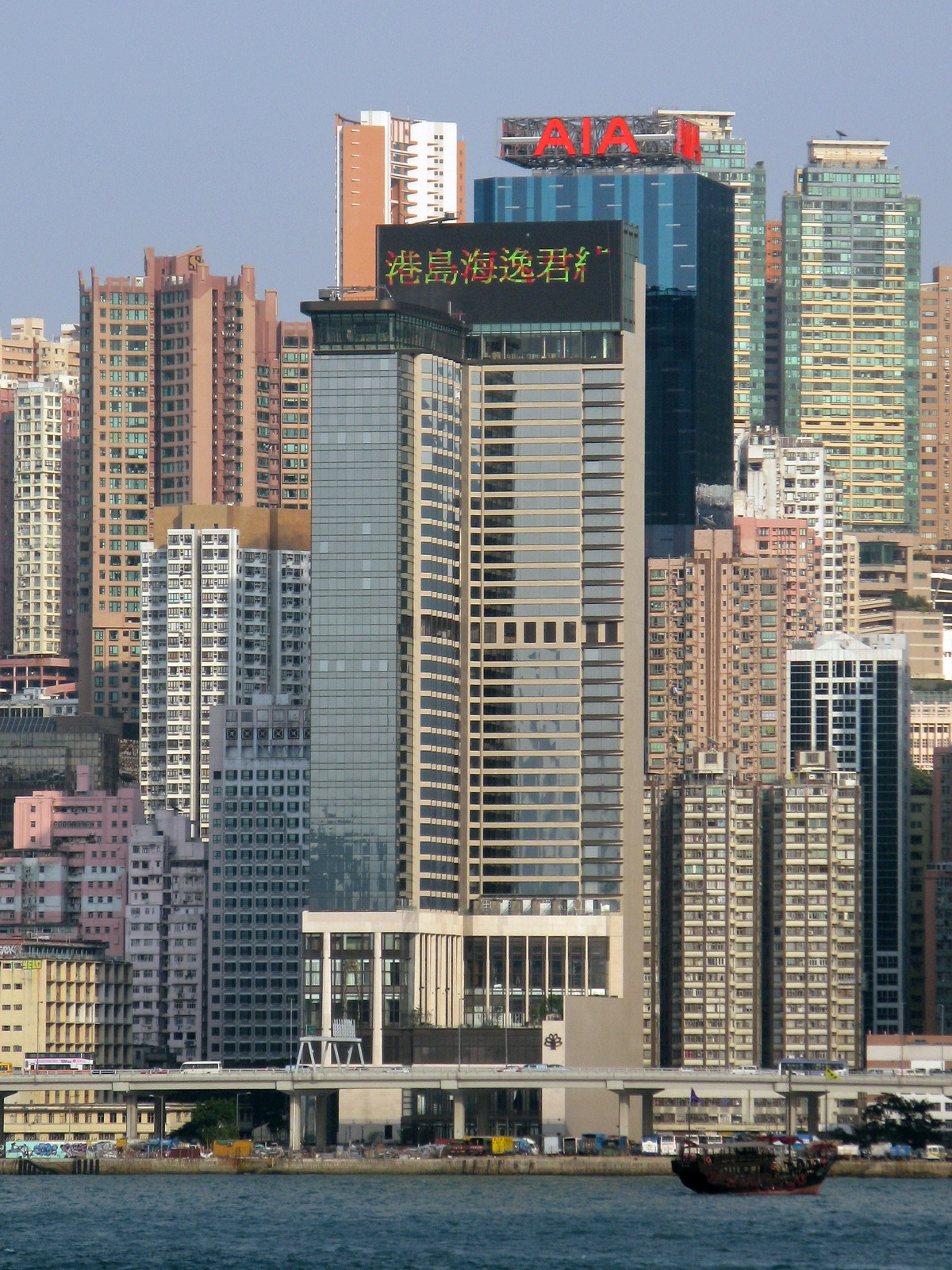
Fortress Hill viewed from Victoria Harbour.

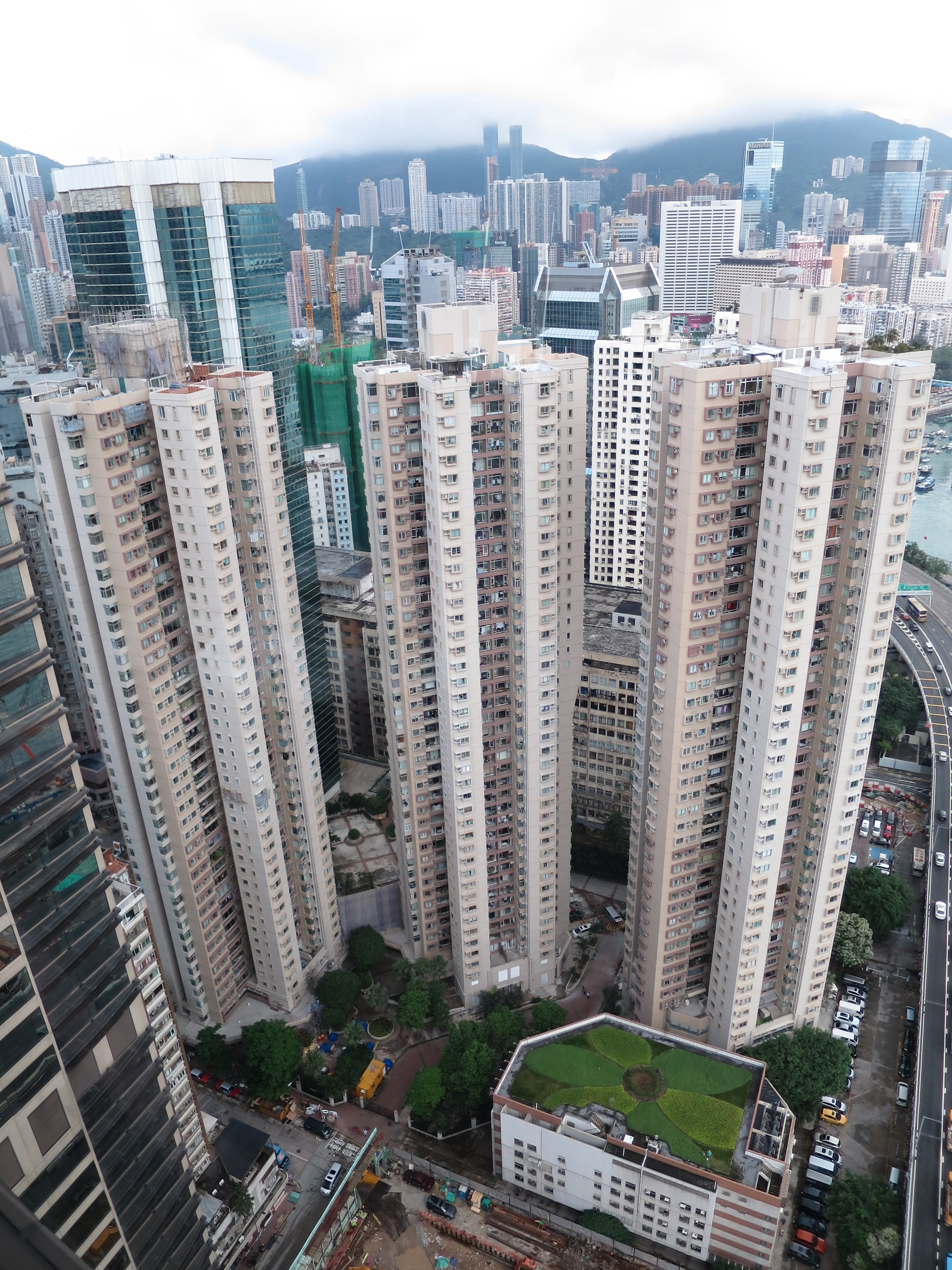
Harbour Heights.

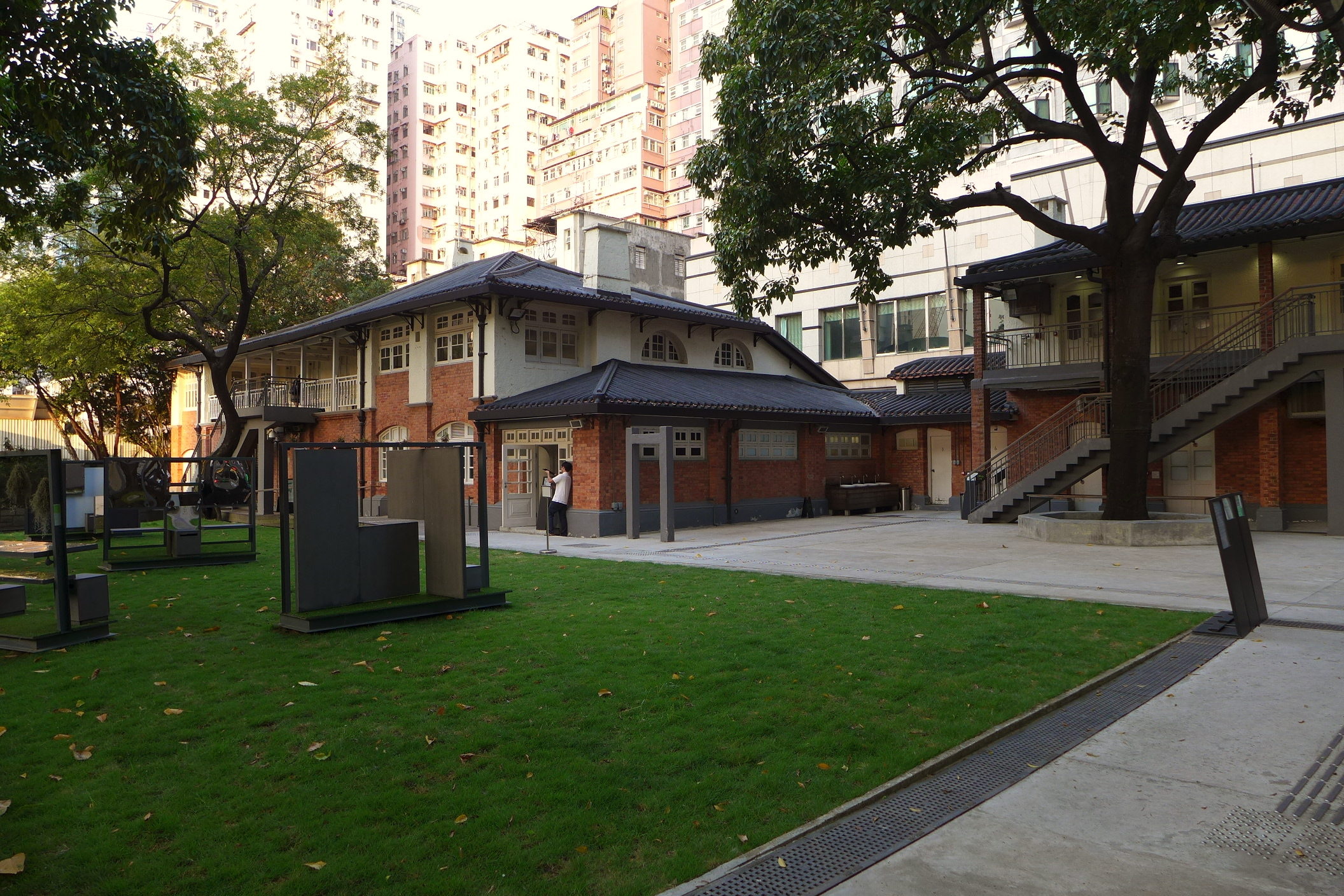
Oi! arts centre.

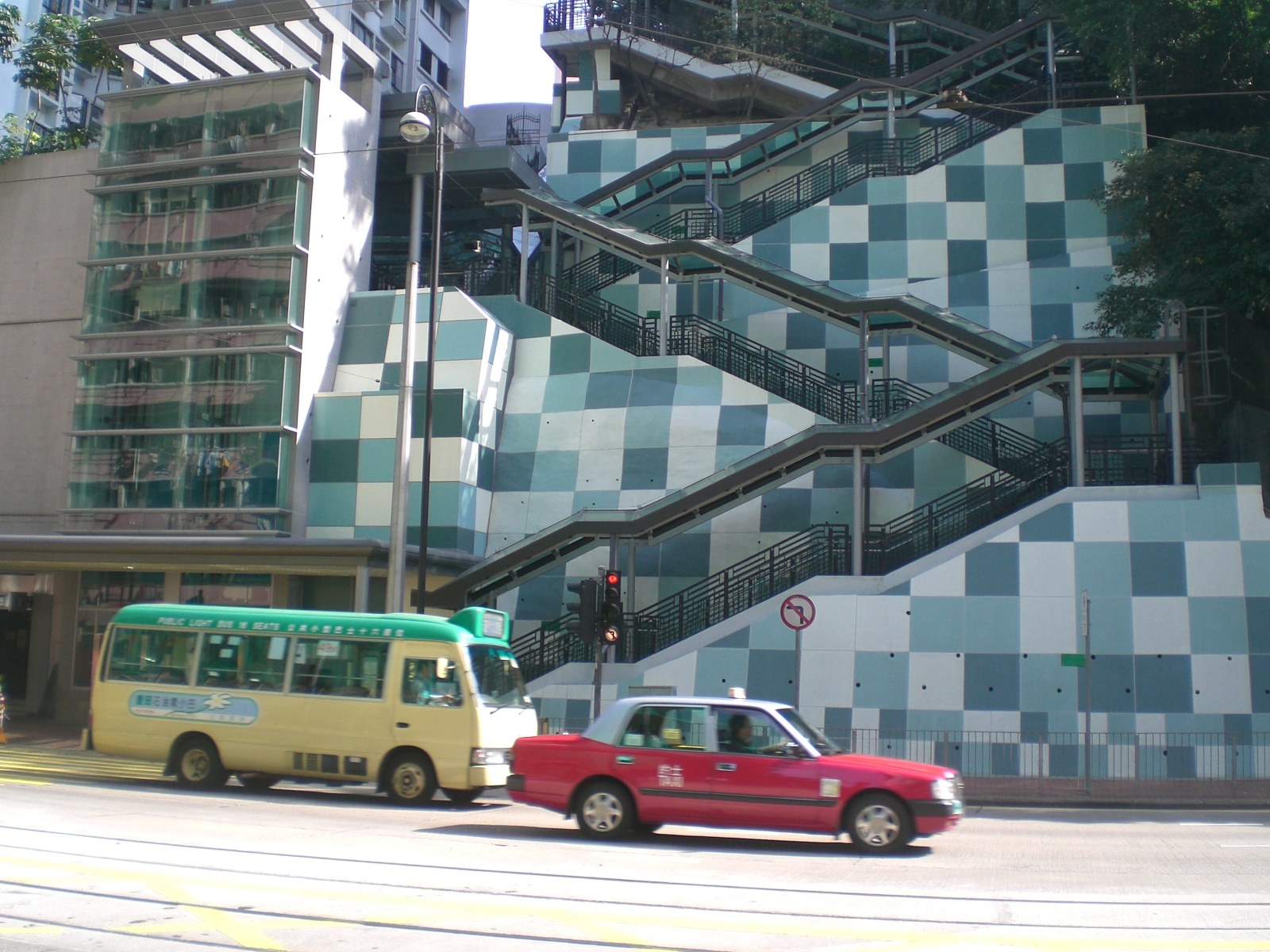
Fortress Hill section of King's Road, near Oil Street Stone Stairs.

Fortress Hill or Pau Toi Shan (Chinese: 炮台山; Jyutping: paau3 toi4 saan1) is a hill and an area on the north shore of Hong Kong Island, Hong Kong. Fortress Hill includes the western part of North Point lying west of Oil Street, and the eastern part of Causeway Bay. There are a number of private residential estates, office buildings, hotels and serviced apartments in this area.

== History ==
The names of Oil Street and Shell Street come from a former oil depot that was established by Royal Dutch (now Royal Dutch Shell) in the area in 1897. The depot was decommissioned in 1981.

== Transport ==
The area is served by the Fortress Hill station of the MTR rapid transit railway, by the Hong Kong Tramways along King's Road and by several bus and minibus routes.

Streets include: King's Road, Electric Road, Island Eastern Corridor, Fortress Hill Road (炮台山道), Oil Street (油街), Shell Street (蜆殼街), and Merlin Street (麥連街).

== See also ==
- North Point Power Station
- List of places in Hong Kong
