= Tung Lo Wan Road =

Road in Hong Kong

Coordinates: 22.27897°N 114.19148°E

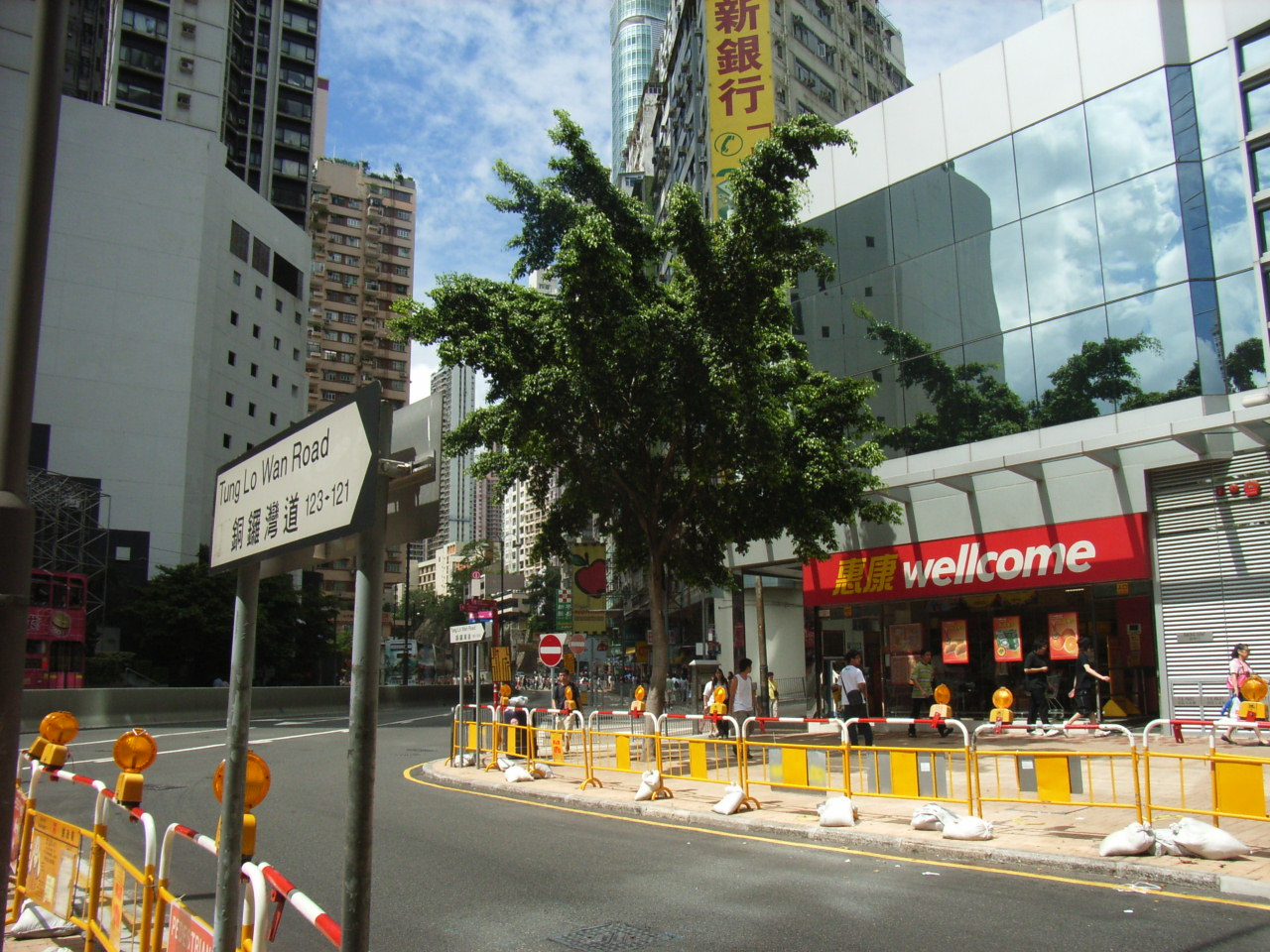
- Eastern end of Tung Lo Wan Road near Tin Hau station
- Interactive map of Tung Lo Wan Road
- Native name: 銅鑼灣道 (Chinese)
- Location: Hong Kong

Construction
- Inauguration: 1935; 91 years ago

Tung Lo Wan Road
- Traditional Chinese: 銅鑼灣道
- Simplified Chinese: 铜锣湾道
Transcriptions
Standard Mandarin
- Hanyu Pinyin: Tóngluówān Dào
Yue: Cantonese
- Jyutping: tung4 lo4 waan1/*4 dou6

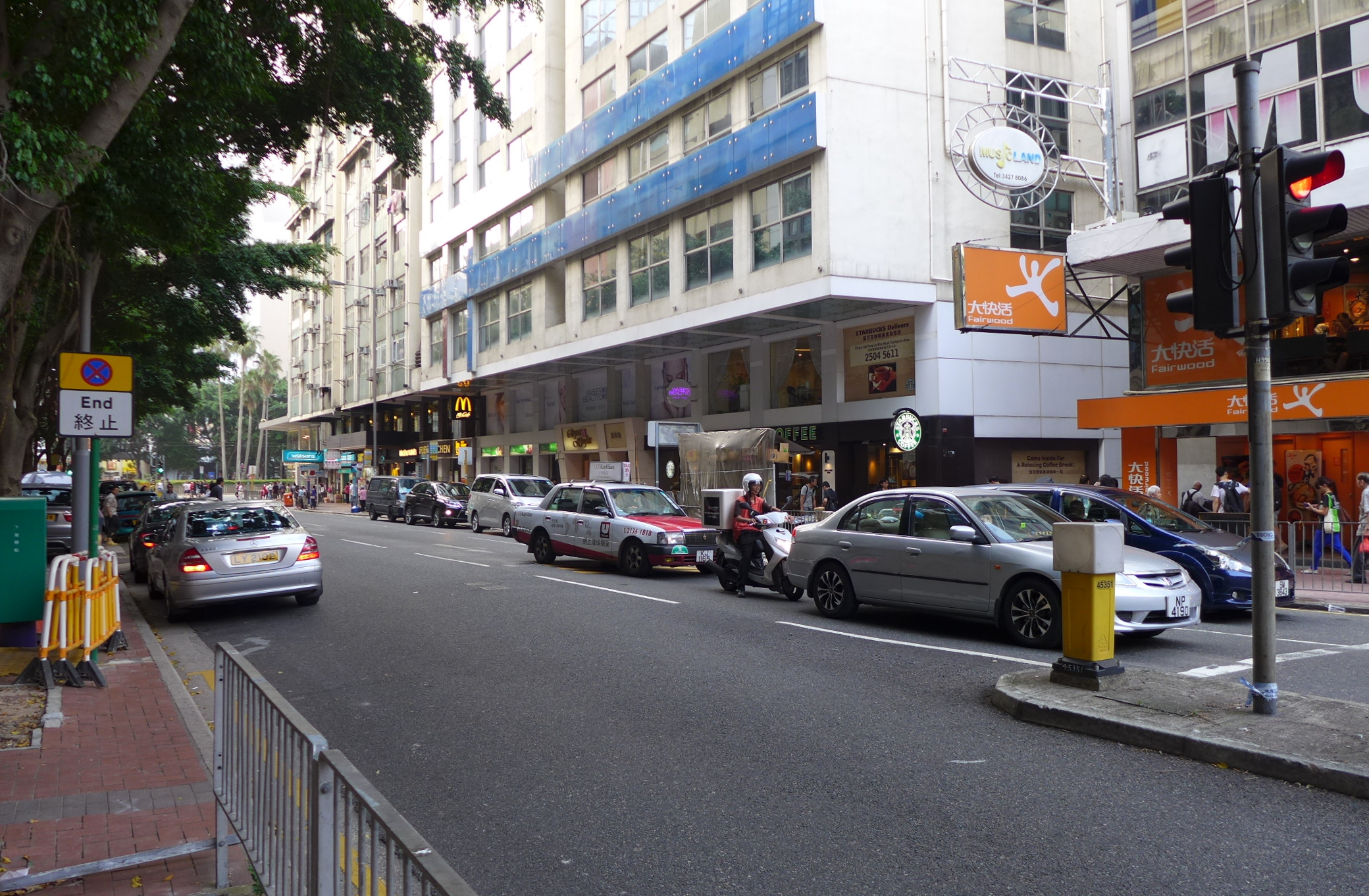
Western end of Tung Lo Wan Road near St. Paul's Convent School

Tung Lo Wan Road (Chinese: 銅鑼灣道) is a road in Causeway Bay and Tai Hang on the north side of Hong Kong Island in Hong Kong. The road joins east with King's Road, Tin Hau Temple Road, Causeway Road and west with Yee Wo Street, Irving Street, Leighton Road and Causeway Road.

== History ==
The road draws the early shore line in the Tung Lo Wan, the native name of Causeway Bay. It was originally part of Shaukiwan Road. In 1883, Hong Kong Government reclaimed part of the bay to present-day Causeway Road. In 1935, the road was renamed to the current name of Tung Lo Wan Road.

== Landmarks ==
Landmarks along Tung Lo Wan Road include (from west to east):

- St. Paul's Convent School
- St. Paul's Hospital
- St. Mary's Church (No. 2A)
- Causeway Bay (Moreton Terrace) Bus Terminus (銅鑼灣 (摩頓台) 巴士總站)
- Fuk Tak Temple, Tai Hang (大坑福德古廟)
- Chinese Recreation Club
- Metropark Hotel Causeway Bay Hong Kong (香港銅鑼灣維景酒店) (No. 148)
- Queen's College

== See also ==
- Land reclamation in Hong Kong
- List of streets and roads in Hong Kong
