= Tin Hau (disambiguation) =

Tin Hau (lit. "Queen of Heaven") may be:

- Mazu, also called "Tin Hau" in Cantonese
- Tin Hau, Hong Kong, area in Hong Kong
  - Tin Hau station, MTR station serving the Tin Hau area
- Tin Hau (constituency), a constituency of the Wan Chai District Council

== See also ==
- Tin Hau temples in Hong Kong
