= Clementi Secondary School =

Government secondary school in Hong Kong

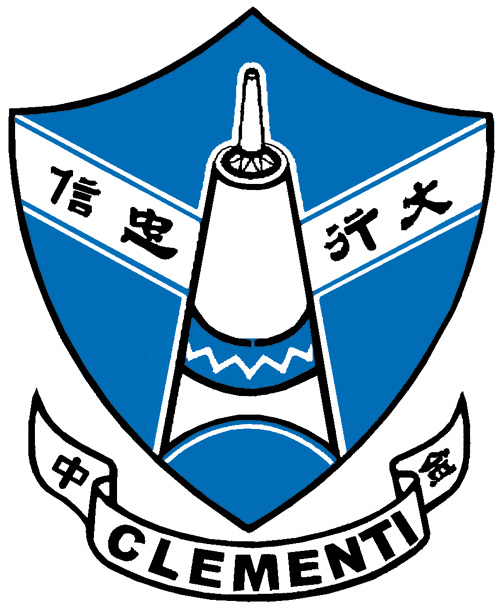

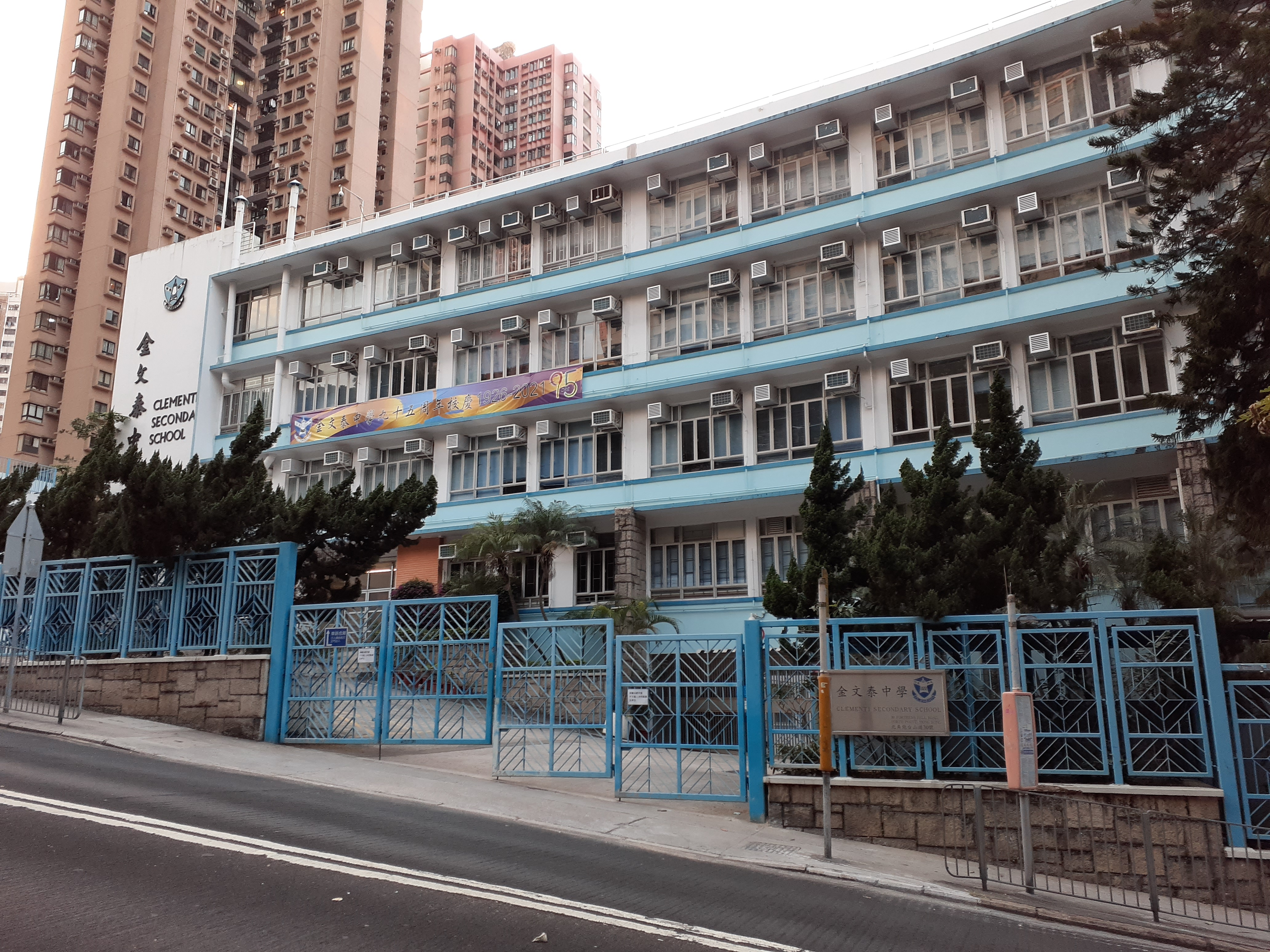

Location
- 30 Fortress Hill Road; North Point, Hong Kong; 22.2874°N 114.1947°E

Information
- Type: Public (Chinese: 官立)
- Motto: Letters, ethics, the devotion of soul, and truthfulness.
- Established: 1 March 1926
- Principal: Mrs. Fung Lai Miu-yee
- Enrollment: Approx. 1,000 students
- Medium of instruction: Chinese
- Campus Size: 2.74 acre
- School Magazine: The Voice (鐸聲)
- Website: clementi.edu.hk

Clementi Secondary School
- Traditional Chinese: 金文泰中學
- Simplified Chinese: 金文泰中学
Transcriptions
Standard Mandarin
- Hanyu Pinyin: Jīnwéntài zhōngxué
Yue: Cantonese
- Jyutping: gam1 man4 taai3 zung1 hok6

Clementi Secondary School (Chinese: 金文泰中學) is a secondary institution in Fortress Hill, North Point, Hong Kong. Founded by the 17th British governor of Hong Kong, Sir Cecil Clementi, the school was the first to use Chinese as the primary medium of instruction in Hong Kong. Besides the strong emphasis on classical Chinese, the school was also instructed, since its founding, to provide a well-rounded English education to its pupils. Students and Alumni of the school are commonly known as "Clementians".

== History ==
Hong Kong governor Cecil Clementi had a profound interest in the Chinese language and decided to establish a school using Chinese as the main medium of instruction. In 1926, Government Vernacular Middle School (官立漢文中學) was founded. Government Vernacular Middle School was the first government school to use Chinese as the principal language of instruction. Li King Hong, the then-Chinese language inspector of schools, was appointed as the first principal of the school.

During World War II, the school suspended its operations under the Japanese occupation of Hong Kong. After the war, the school was renamed Government Vernacular Senior Middle School (官立漢文高級中學). It was renamed again in 1951 to Clementi Middle School (金文泰中學) and in 1988 to Clementi Secondary School, after the governor.

The school has been relocated several times:

- 1926–1927 26–28 Hospital Road (now site of Lok Sin Tong Leung Kau Kui College)
- 1927–1941 Pok Fu Lam Road
- 1945–1946 Bridge Street (now Chinese YMCA of Hong Kong Bridge Centre)
- 1946–1948 Wood Road (formerly Government Trade School Building c. 1937)
- 1948–1961 28 Kennedy Road

It has been at the current site of 30 Fortress Hill Road since September 23, 1961.

The school principal is currently Mrs. Fung Lai Miu-yee, who succeeded Ms. Li Sui-wah in 2013.

== Notable alumni ==
=== Politicians, government officials, and legislators ===
- Sir Kenneth Fung Ping-fan, Former Senior Chinese Unofficial Member in Urban Council, Executive Council and Legislative Council.
- Tsang Yam Pui, Former Commissioner of Hong Kong Police Force.
- Lee Ming-kwai, Former Commissioner of Hong Kong Police Force.
- Leung Kwok-hung, Politician, Member of Hong Kong Legislative Council, Chairman of the League of Social Democrats.
- Eddie Ng Hak-kim, Secretary for Education of the Hong Kong Government, Member of the Executive Council, Former Chairman of Hong Kong Examinations and Assessment Authority (HKEAA)

=== Academics ===
- Prof. Daniel Chee Tsui, physicist, a graduate of the university preparatory class of Clementi. Nobel Physics Prize Laureate for his contributions to the discovery of the fractional quantum Hall Effect.
- Prof. Sau Lan Wu, physicist. Enrico Fermi and Vilas Professor of Physics at University of Wisconsin-Madison and winner of 1995 High Energy and Particle Physics Prize of the European Physical Society for "the first evidence of three-jet events in E+E-collisions at PETRA"

=== Business ===
- Peggy Cherng, Chinese-American billionaire businesswoman and electrical engineer
