= Causeway Bay =

Area and bay on Hong Kong Island

Coordinates: 22.28066°N 114.18096°E

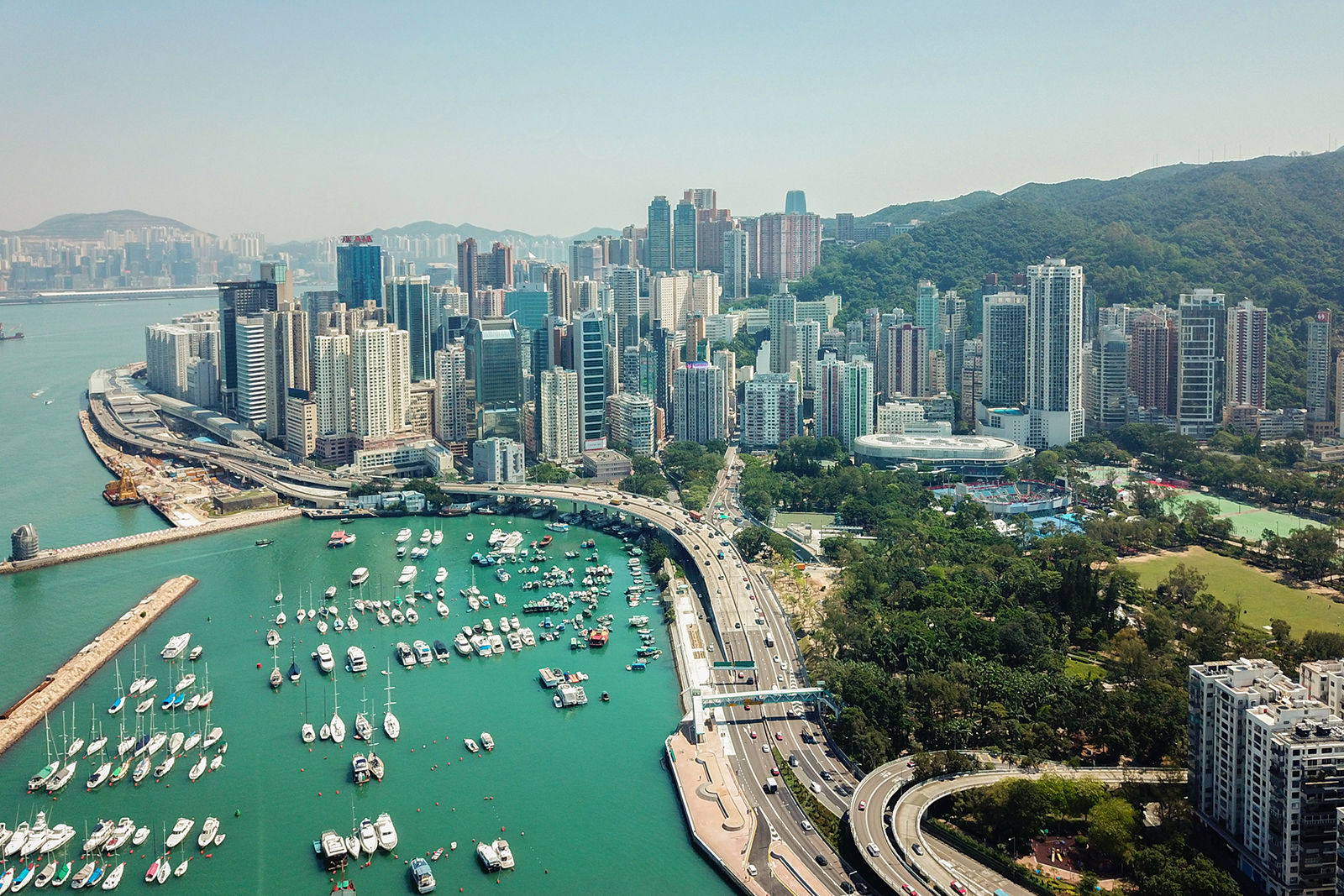
- High-density buildings in Causeway Bay and Victoria Park
- Traditional Chinese: 銅鑼灣
- Simplified Chinese: 铜锣湾
- Cantonese Yale: Tùhnglòh wāan, Tùhnglòh wàahn
- Literal meaning: "Copper Gong Bay"
Transcriptions
Standard Mandarin
- Hanyu Pinyin: Tóngluó wān
Wu
- Wugniu: don^{2} lu^{2} uae^{1}
- IPA: Shanghainese: [doŋ˩ lu˦ ue˩]
Yue: Cantonese
- Yale Romanization: Tùhnglòh wāan, Tùhnglòh wàahn
- Jyutping: tung^{4} lo^{4} waan^{1}, tung^{4} lo^{4} waan^{4}
- IPA: [tʰʊ̏ŋlɔ̏ː wȁːn], [tʰʊ̏ŋlɔ̏ː wa̋ːn]

Causeway Bay is an area and a bay on Hong Kong Island, Hong Kong, straddling the border of the Eastern and the Wan Chai districts. It is a major shopping, leisure and cultural centre in Hong Kong, with a number of major shopping centres. The rents in the shopping areas of Causeway Bay were ranked as the world's most expensive for around a decade after overtaking New York City's Fifth Avenue in 2012. The area's Cantonese name "Tung Lo Wan" is never used to refer to the area in English, and "Causeway Bay" is always used instead. (Note: There is a separate location named "Tung Lo Wan" in the Sha Tin District in eastern New Territories. However, Causeway Bay has been named by the government not long after its colonisation, and hence the official English name of the place has always been "Causeway Bay" instead of "Tung Lo Wan". Of note is that two streets named after the area, Tung Lo Wan Road and Tung Lo Wan Drive, use romanised names, resulting in names partially identical to Sha Tin's Tung Lo Wan.)

== Location ==
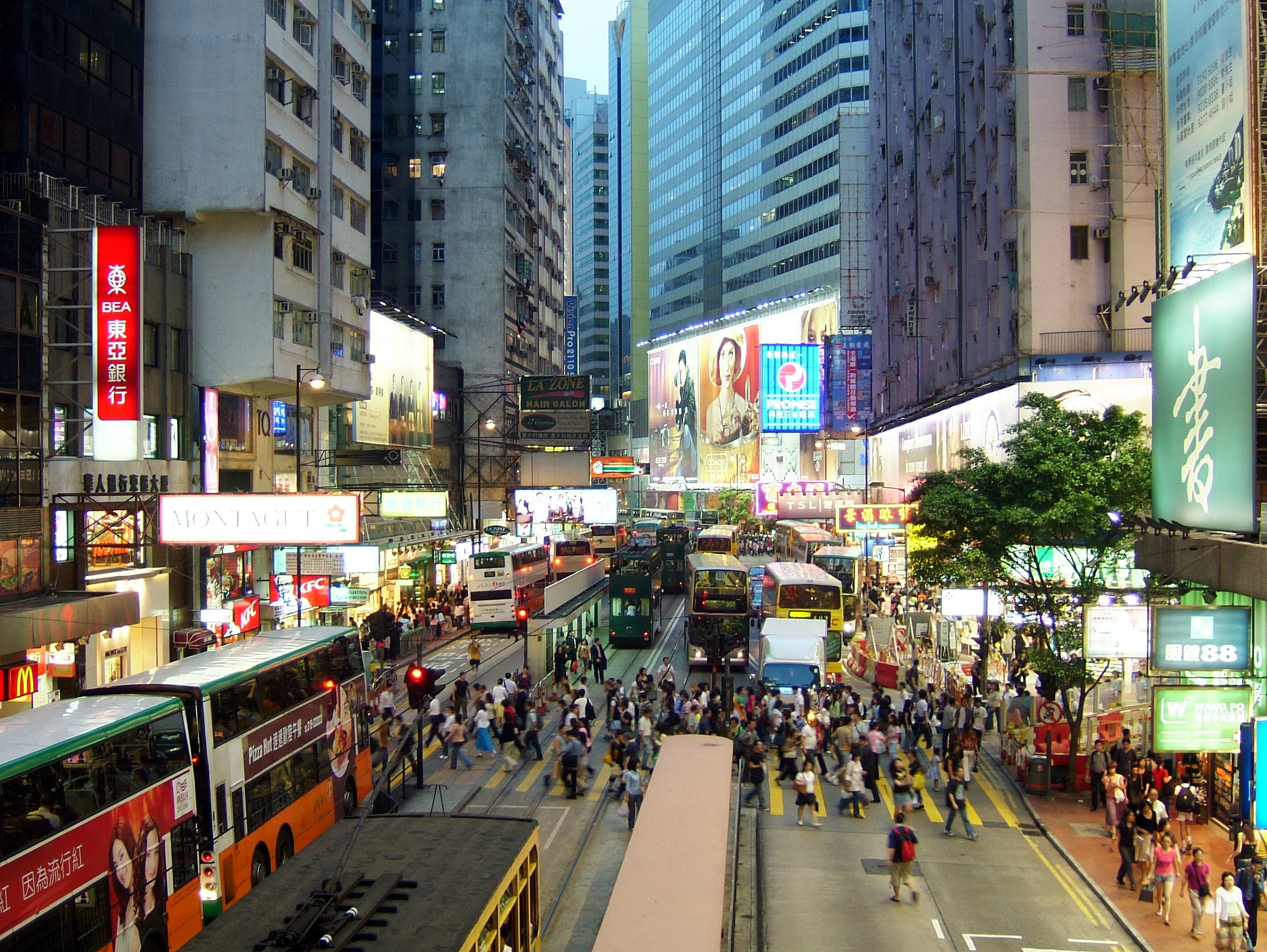
The busy Yee Wo Street crossing

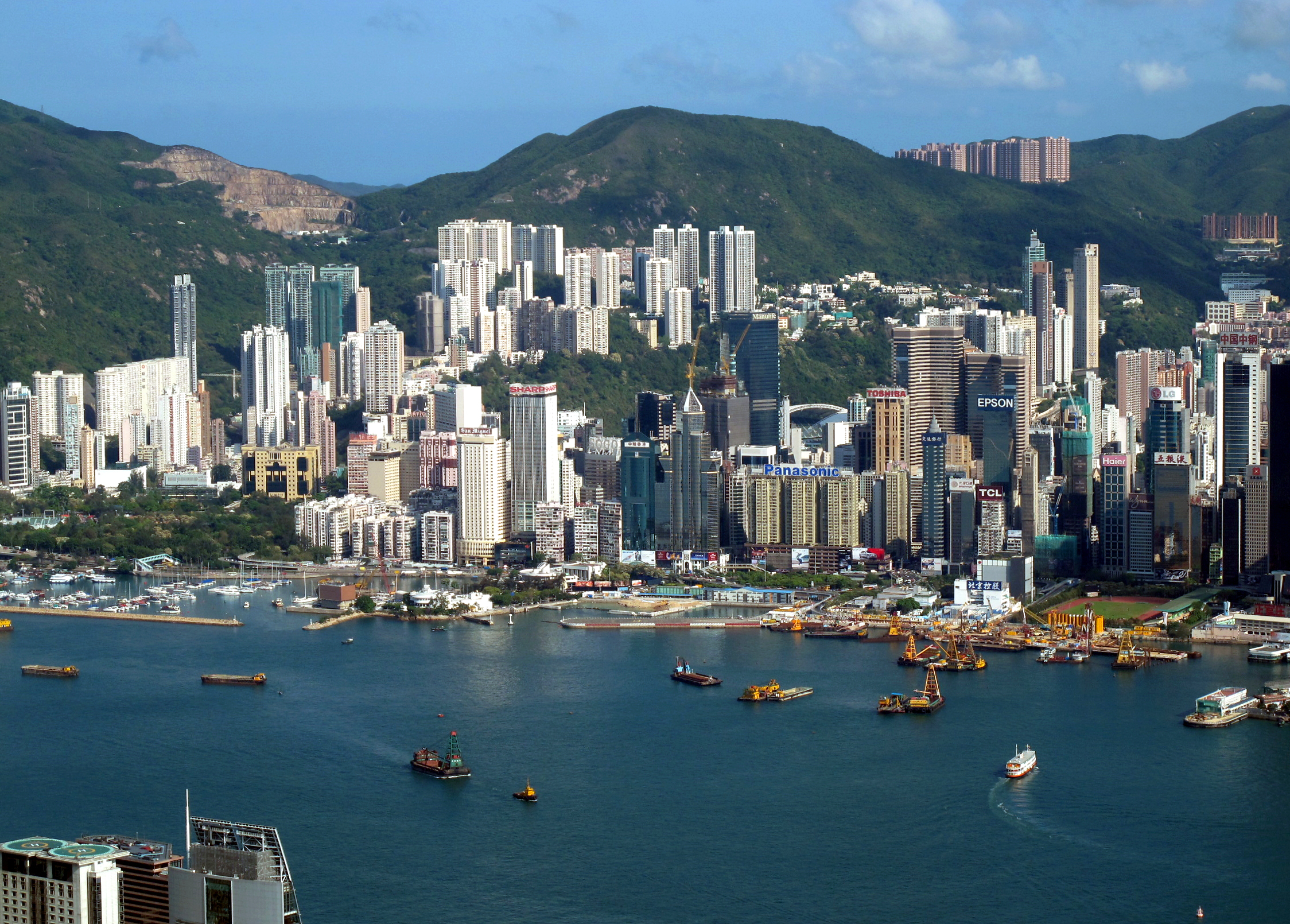
View from Kowloon peninsula

Causeway Bay is located at the eastern end of the Wanchai District and the western end of the Eastern District. Causeway Bay includes Tsing Fung Street, Causeway Bay Market, the Victoria Park, the Royal Hong Kong Yacht Club, Oil Street, Jardine's Noonday Gun, the Police Officers Club, the Queen's College and the Hong Kong Central Library. Traditionally, Causeway Bay refers to the area near today's Tin Hau Station, but Causeway Bay now comprises the area south of Victoria Harbour, with Oil Street as the eastern boundary, Tung Lo Wan Road and Leighton Road as the southern border, and Canal Road Flyover as the western boundary. However, Causeway Bay is often considered as solely including the area surrounding Causeway Bay Station, the area traditionally known as East Point.

Since 1982, two electoral constituencies of Causeway Bay (Causeway Bay North and Causeway Bay South) had been grouped into the Eastern District of district board elections, whilst Causeway Bay Central was grouped with the Wan Chai District to the west. However, local government decisions—other than electoral demarcations—still affect the region as a whole. Since 1994, the area has further been subdivided in Hong Kong district board elections into smaller constituencies. The northern sector consists of the area around Victoria Park, the middle sector coincides with the central business district, and the southern sector forms the area around Tin Hau.

To cope with population change, the constituency boundary between Wan Chai District and Eastern District was changed on the New Year's Day of 2016 (effective on voting in 2015 Hong Kong local elections). As a result, the Victoria Park and Tin Hau constituencies became a part of Wan Chai District starting from that day. As a consequence, a larger proportion of Causeway Bay is now part of Wan Chai District; whereas the easternmost parts of the area, such as Oil Street, and the western side of Tin Hau Temple Road, remain in the Eastern District.

Town planning is managed by the Causeway Bay Outline Zoning Plan, which is not related to the electoral boundaries as drawn by the Electoral Affairs Commission. The OZP also covers the other neighbourhoods of Tai Hang and So Kon Po. The OZP, however, does not manage Victoria Park, which was reclaimed from the Causeway Bay/Tung Lo Wan body of water, nor Tin Hau, which is historically part of Tung Lo Wan. Tung Lo Wan is the Cantonese name that collectively refers to the waters and lands around the bay.

Causeway Bay Market and Causeway Bay Fire Station are in fact located in Tin Hau, and are outside the jurisdiction of the OZP, but in terms of the electoral constituency, the market, the fire station, and Victoria Park are located within the Victoria Park constituency. Added to this confusion, Wan Chai Fire Station is located in the Canal Road constituency but some non-government sources consider it as part of the Causeway Bay area. The Wan Chai Fire Station is not part of Causeway Bay OZP.

== History ==
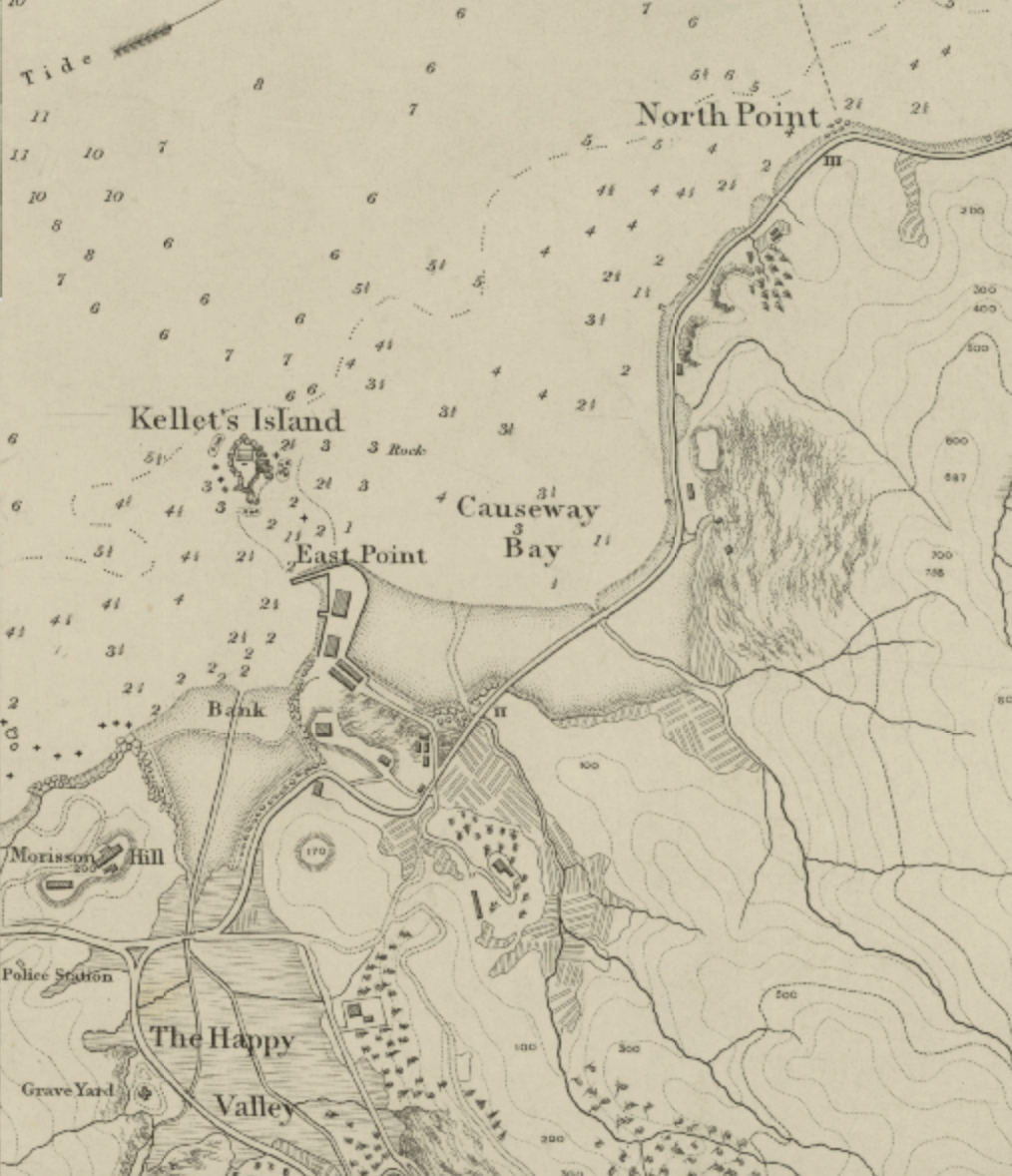
Causeway Bay as shown on a map in 1845.

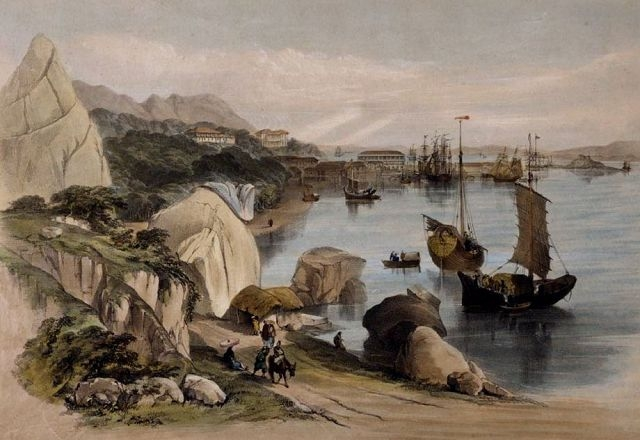
View of Causeway Bay, 1846

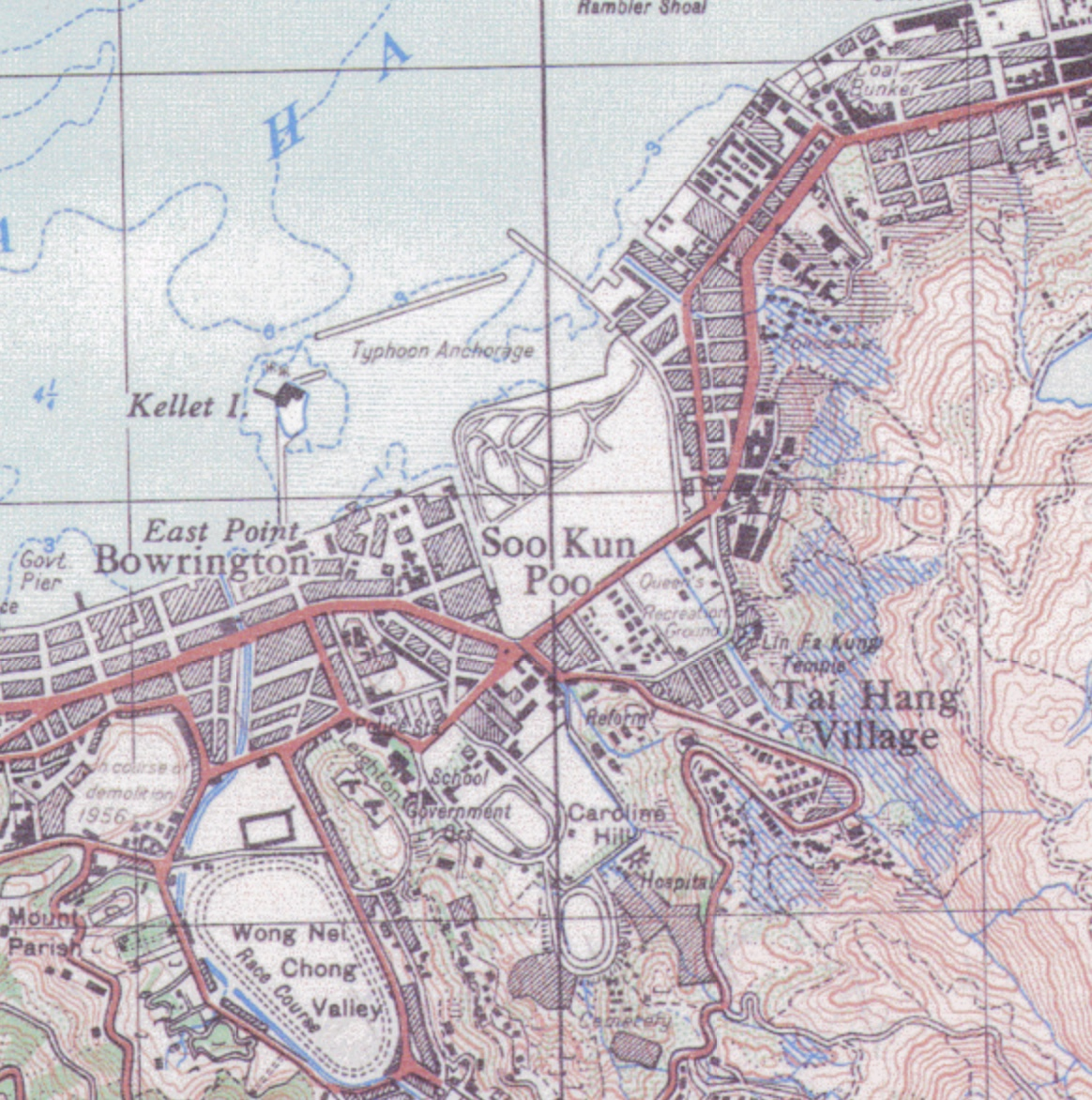
Causeway Bay in 1957. The original Causeway Bay was reclaimed and in development (in white)

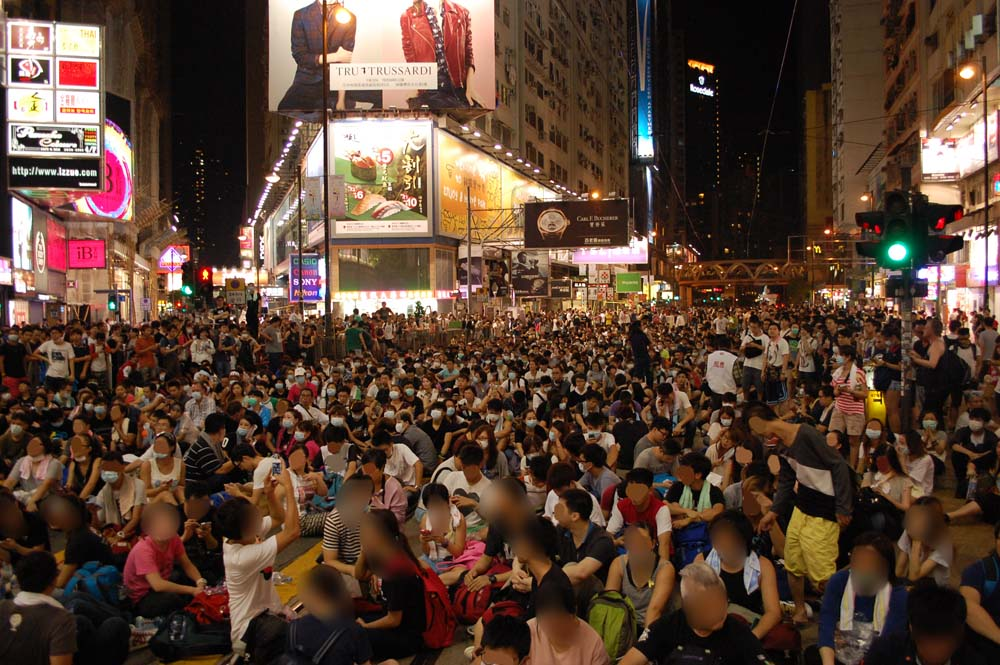
Causeway Bay during the 2014 Hong Kong protests

The typhoon shelter of Causeway Bay and the Tin Hau Temple reveal that the area was once a fishing town. Before urban development and massive land reclamation, Causeway Bay was a heavily silted bay. Its former shape can be found on maps by tracing Tung Lo Wan Road, which goes along the former bay. In the early stage of development, a causeway was built, which is the present-day Causeway Road. In the 1950s, the coastline was further pushed forward when the remains of the bay were reclaimed for the Victoria Park, when the statue of Queen Victoria was brought back from Japan. The statue had been taken away during the Second World War from Statue Square at Chater Road, Central. Kellett Island off the coast of Causeway Bay has been connected to the Hong Kong Island by a breakwater as a result of the land reclamation.

Causeway Bay's history as a shopping district dates back to 1960, when Daimaru, a Japanese style department store opened in Great George Street. By the 1970s, Causeway Bay has developed into Hong Kong's main shopping district. A number of other Japanese style department stores, including Matsuzakaya, Mitsukoshi and Sogo, opened in the 1970s and 1980s, giving Causeway Bay the nickname of "little Ginza". In the 1990s, several major shopping centres were constructed, strengthening Causeway Bay's status as one of the major shopping districts in Hong Kong.

The original Causeway Bay proper around the bay is actually the area now known as Tin Hau, near the present-day Tin Hau MTR station and the Causeway Bay Tin Hau Temple, whereas the Causeway Bay MTR station is at the area historically called East Point.

The present-day usage of the name Causeway Bay is usually confused with East Point, an area named after a spit on the coastline, eastern end of formerly Victoria City. The names of Yee Wo Street, Jardine's Bazaar, and Jardine's Crescent reveal that the land in this area was sold by the British colonial government to Jardines in the early 19th century.

Another area often mistaken as Causeway Bay is Bowrington area or in Cantonese Ngo Keng (鵝頸) (now part of Canal Road electoral constituency), literally "goose's neck", where is known for villain hitting activity, a voodoo-like tradition of Hong Kong.

== Features ==
Causeway Bay or East Point is one of Hong Kong's major shopping districts. It includes the 13-storey Japanese-style department store Sogo, as well as shopping centres such as Times Square and Hysan Place. There are also smaller malls such as World Trade Centre, Windsor House, Hang Lung Centre, Fashion Island (formerly Daimaru), Fashion Walk, Lee Garden One and Lee Garden Two. Causeway Bay is one of the most crowded and central areas in Hong Kong. The area contains many trendy shops carrying both locally made and imported fashion and products from around the world. As such, it is a popular social spot for young people. Many shops are open until after midnight.

Notable hotels in Causeway Bay include Park Lane Hotel and Regal Hong Kong Hotel. Several boutique hotels have opened recently, including Lanson Place Causeway Bay, Hong Kong, Mira Moon Hotel on Jaffe Road.

For years, Jardine Matheson has fired a cannon shot at noon every day in Causeway Bay, by Victoria Harbour, slightly eastward of the former Kellett Island. The gunshots have served as time signals for many generations of old inhabitants of Hong Kong. This tradition still continues today. This is the "Noonday Gun" mentioned in the Noël Coward song "Mad Dogs and Englishmen".

Although the names of certain landmarks in the western part of Causeway Bay start with "Wan Chai" (e.g. Wan Chai Fire Station), the landmarks are across the local customary limit of Wan Chai on Canal Road.

== Places in Causeway Bay ==
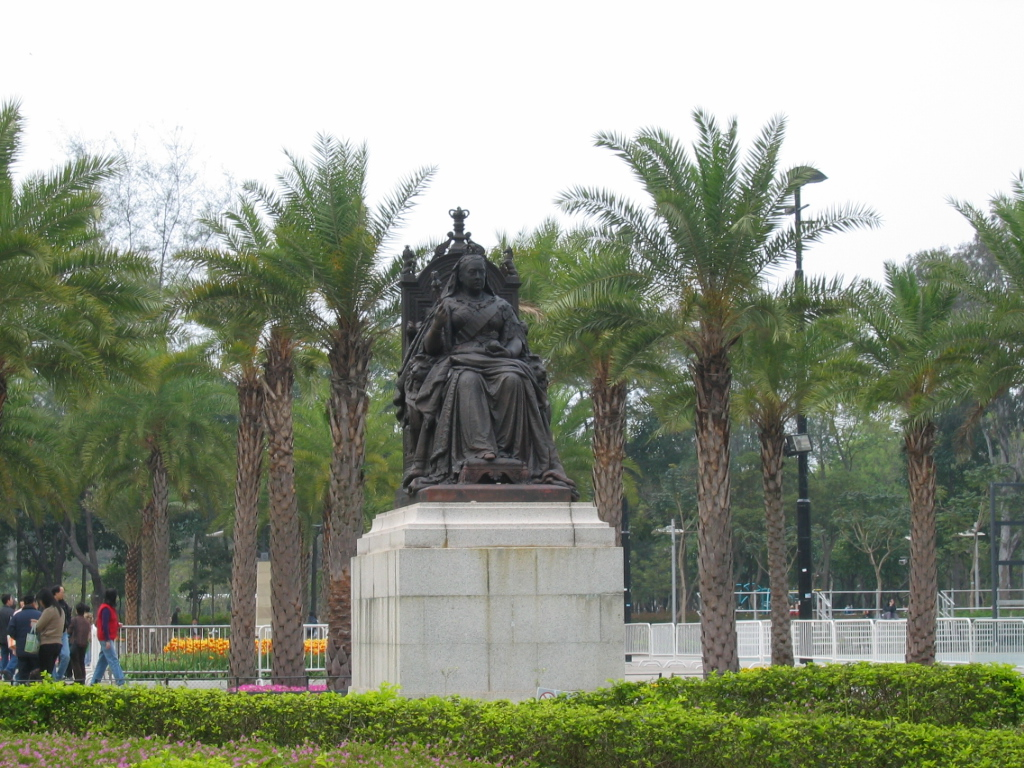
Statue of Queen Victoria in Victoria Park

=== Leisure and Cultural ===
- Hong Kong Central Library
- Hong Kong Jockey Club and Happy Valley Racecourse
- Hong Kong Football Club
- Noonday Gun
- Royal Hong Kong Yacht Club
- Victoria Park
- South China Athletic Association clubhouse
- Zoroastrian Prayer Hall
- Hong Kong Stadium
- Pok Leung Kuk
- St Paul's Hospital
- Craigengower Cricket Club
- Chinese Recreation Club
- Police Officers’ Club
- Disciplined Services Sports and Recreation Club
- Indian Recreation Club
- Causeway Bay Sports Ground

=== Shopping ===
- Sogo
- Times Square
- World Trade Centre
- Hysan Place
- Windsor House
- Lee Gardens
- Fashion Walk
- Russell Street

== Education ==
Causeway Bay is in Primary One Admission (POA) School Net 12. Within the school net are multiple aided schools (operated independently but funded with government money) and the following government schools: Hennessy Road Government Primary School and Sir Ellis Kadoorie (Sookunpo) Primary School. St Paul's Convent School, a prestigious Catholic girls’ school known for its strong academic performance and bilingual curriculum, and Queen's College, one of Hong Kong's oldest and most renowned boys’ schools with a long tradition of excellence, are also located in the area.

The main Hong Kong Central Library, operated by Hong Kong Public Libraries is located in Causeway Bay.

== Transport ==
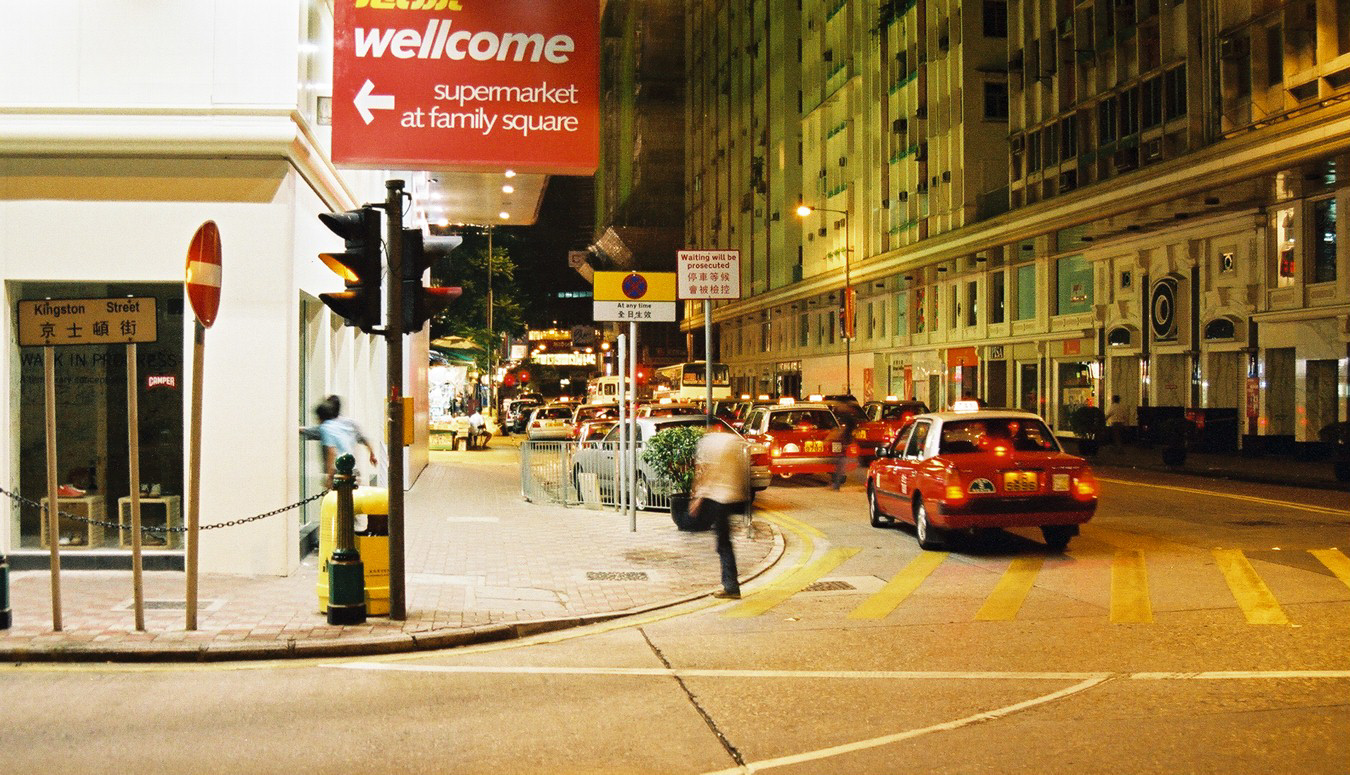
Causeway Bay at night, at Kingston Street

=== Main roads and notable streets ===
- King's Road
- Causeway Road
- Gloucester Road
- Canal Road
- Hennessy Road
- Yee Wo Street
- Paterson Street
- Great George Street
- Cross Harbour Tunnel
- Aberdeen Tunnel
- Russell Street
- Electric Road
- Tung Lo Wan Road
- Hing Fat Street
- Tin Hau Temple Road
- Wun Sha Street

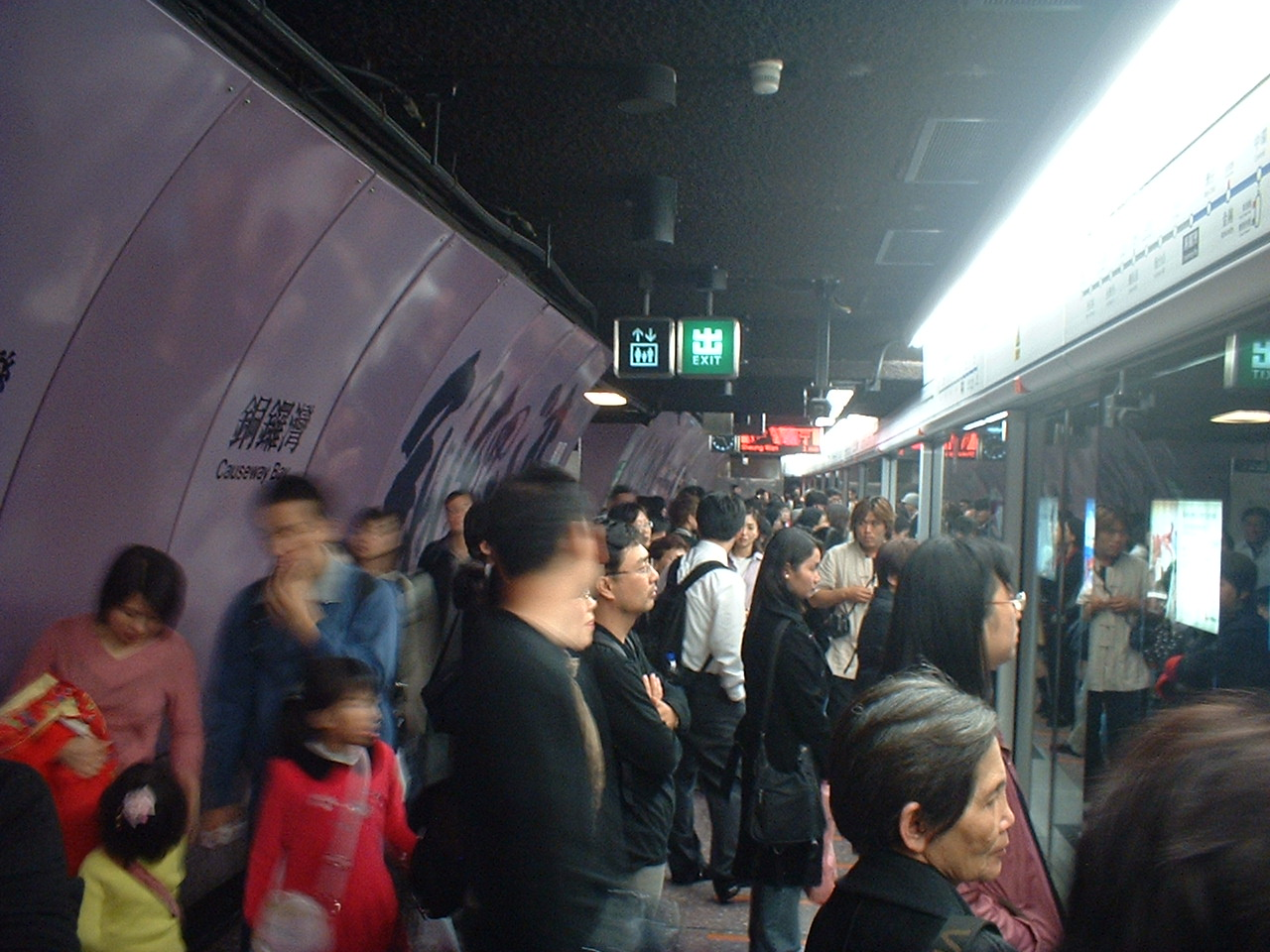
Causeway Bay station

=== Public transport ===
For the MTR, it is connected by the Island line: Tin Hau and Causeway Bay stations. Both Tram and bus services serve Causeway Bay, connecting it to most other major parts of Hong Kong. Mini buses are also running extensively in the area. Causeway Bay is located at the entrance of Cross-Harbour Tunnel and Aberdeen Tunnel, providing convenient access to Kowloon and Southern District.

== See also ==
- List of buildings, sites and areas in Hong Kong
- Moreton Terrace
