= Tin Hau Temple, Causeway Bay =

Temple in Hong Kong

Coordinates: 22.282187°N 114.19276°E

- 銅鑼灣天后廟

Religion
- Affiliation: Chinese folk religion
- Deity: Tin Hau
- Festival: Birthday of Tin Hau
- Governing body: Tai Family Clan

Location
- Country: Hong Kong
- Interactive map of Tin Hau Temple, Causeway Bay

Tin Hau Temple
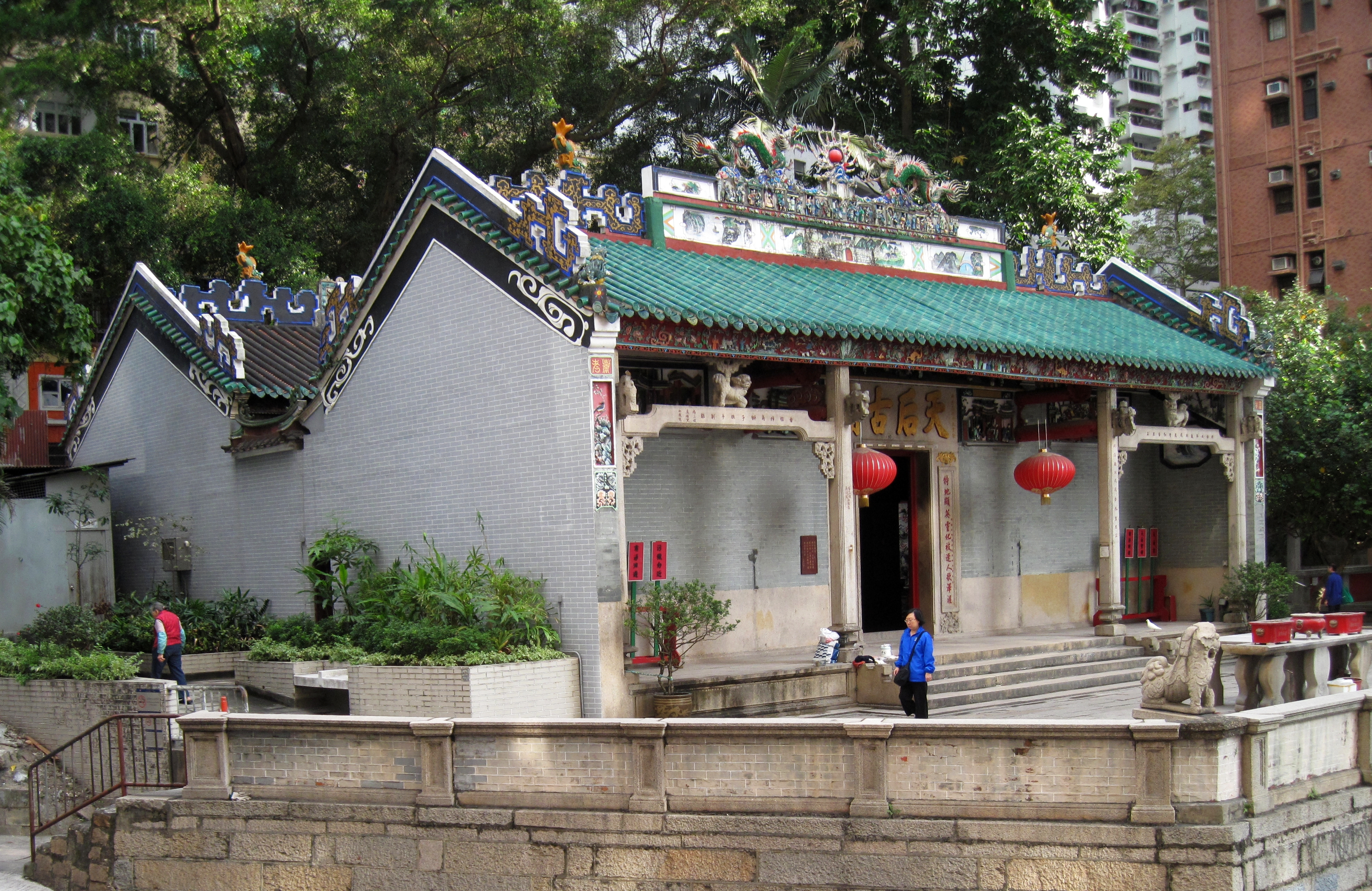
- Tin Hau Temple, Causeway Bay
- Traditional Chinese: 銅鑼灣天后廟
Transcriptions
Yue: Cantonese
- Yale Romanization: Tùhng lòh wàahn tīn hauh míu
- Jyutping: Tung4 lo4 waan4 tin1 hau6 miu2

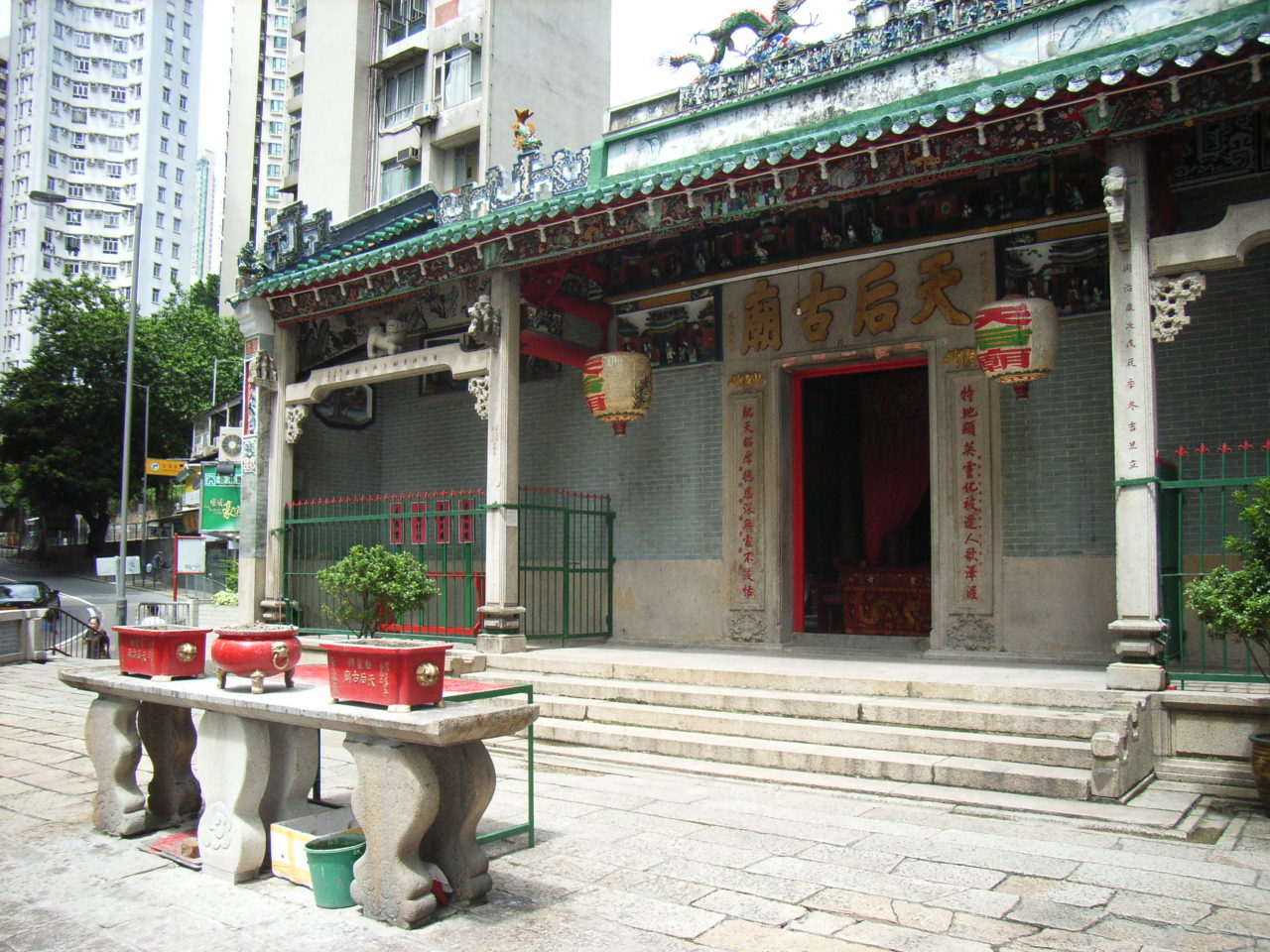
Facade

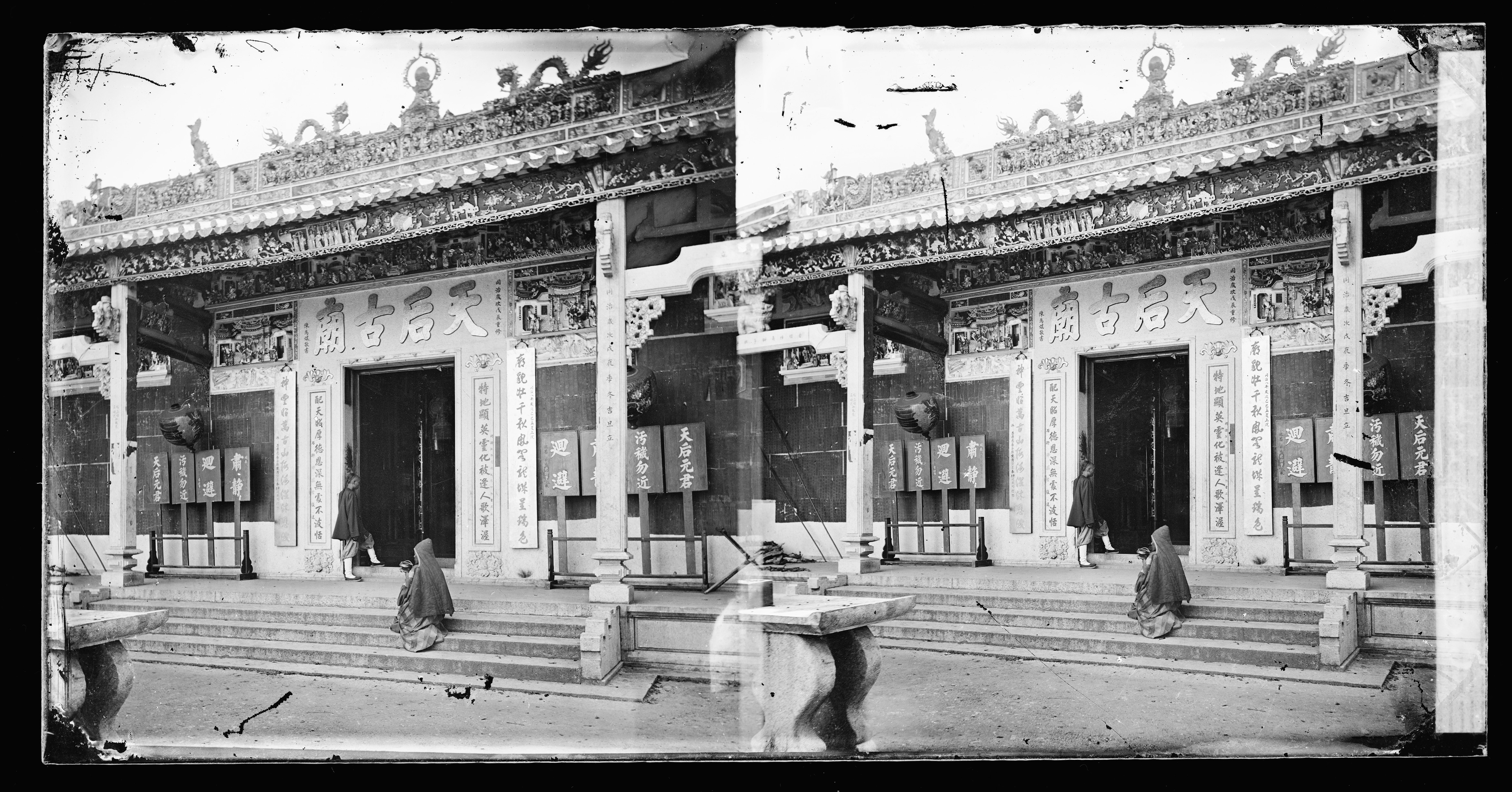
Tin Hau Temple, Causeway Bay, photographed by John Thomson in 1869

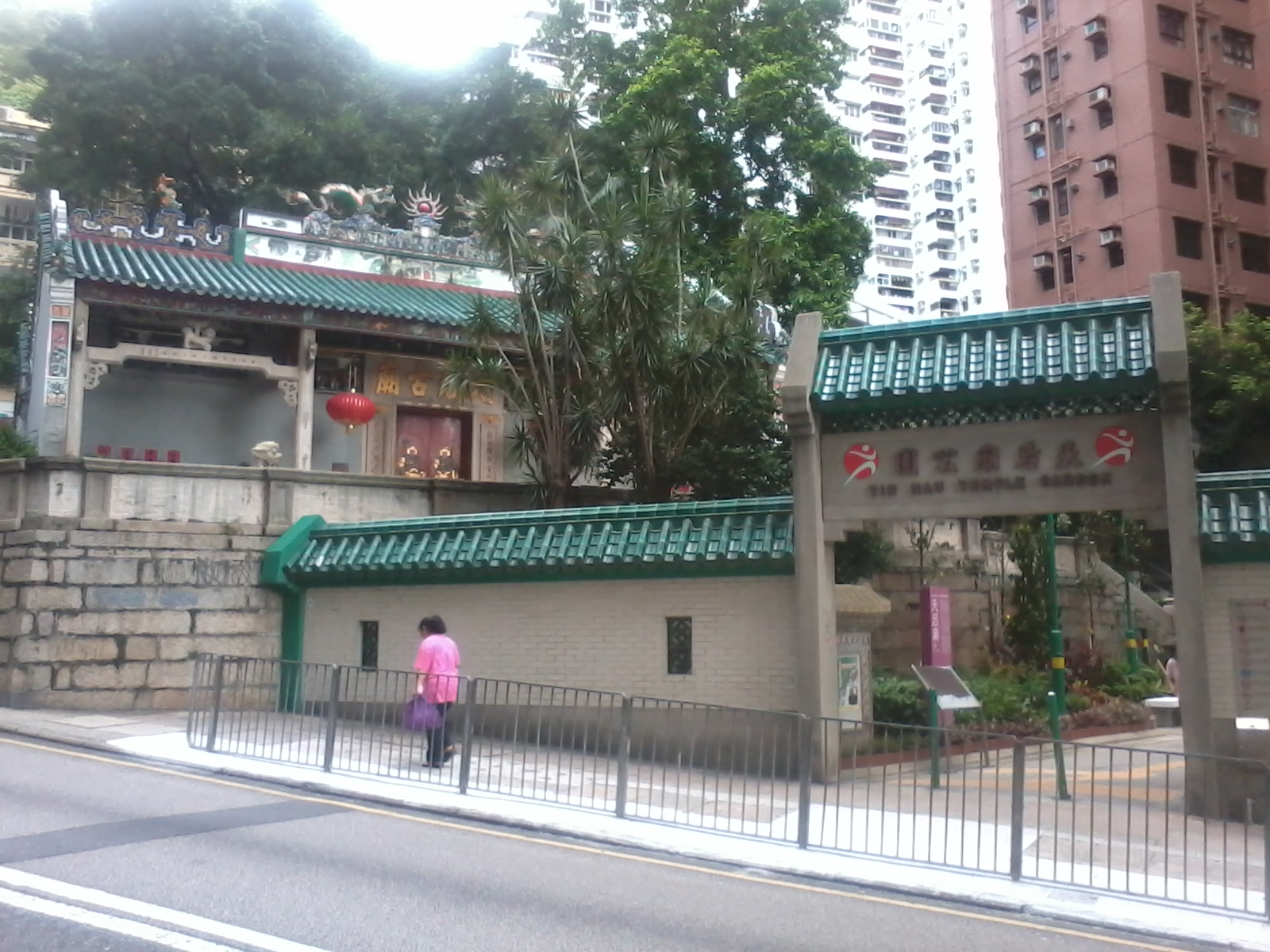
View from Tin Hau Temple Road, with entrance of the Tin Hau Temple Garden

The Tin Hau Temple in Causeway Bay is one of the Tin Hau temples in Hong Kong. It is located at 10 Tin Hau Temple Road, Causeway Bay, east of Victoria Park, in Eastern District, on Hong Kong Island. The temple has given its name to the MTR station serving it (Island line), and consequently the neighbouring area of Tin Hau.

== History ==
The original temple dates back to 1747 (the date of the temple bell) and was built by members of the Tai family, a family of Hakkas from Guangdong, who first settled in Kowloon. Legend has it, the family used to travel by boat to Causeway Bay to gather grass and discovered an incense burner found floating miraculously on the sea. This incident gave rise to one of the pre-colonial names for Hong Kong Island, Hung Heung Lo (Red Incense-burner island).

The present building dates back to 1868 and despite renovations, is still largely in its original form. It is now located inland as a consequence of land reclamation, originally being on the waterfront.

== Architecture and layout ==
The temple's main hall is flanked by two side halls. The roof is decorated with famous for the fine Shek Wan figurines on its roof and eaves, and the quality of its stone carvings around the entrance. Inside the temple, the main altar and several side altars are dedicated to Tin Hau, Goddess of the Sea and patron deity of seafarers.

Additional side altars dedicated to Tsoi San, the God of Wealth, and Kwun Yum, the Goddess of childbirth. Finally there are side altars to the black-faced Pau Kung, the Lenient Judge of the Underworld. He is worshipped in the hope that he will be merciful to the souls in his care.

== Conservation ==
The Tin Hau Temple in Causeway Bay became a declared monument in 1982.
