= Tin Hau Temple Road =

Near Tin Hau MTR station on Hong Kong Island

Coordinates: 22°17′16.1″N 114°11′58.1″E

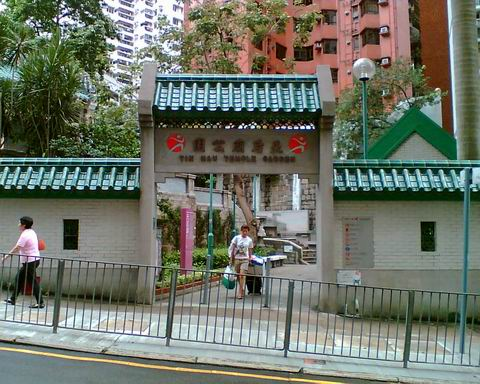
Entrance of the Tin Hau Temple Garden along Tin Hau Temple Road.

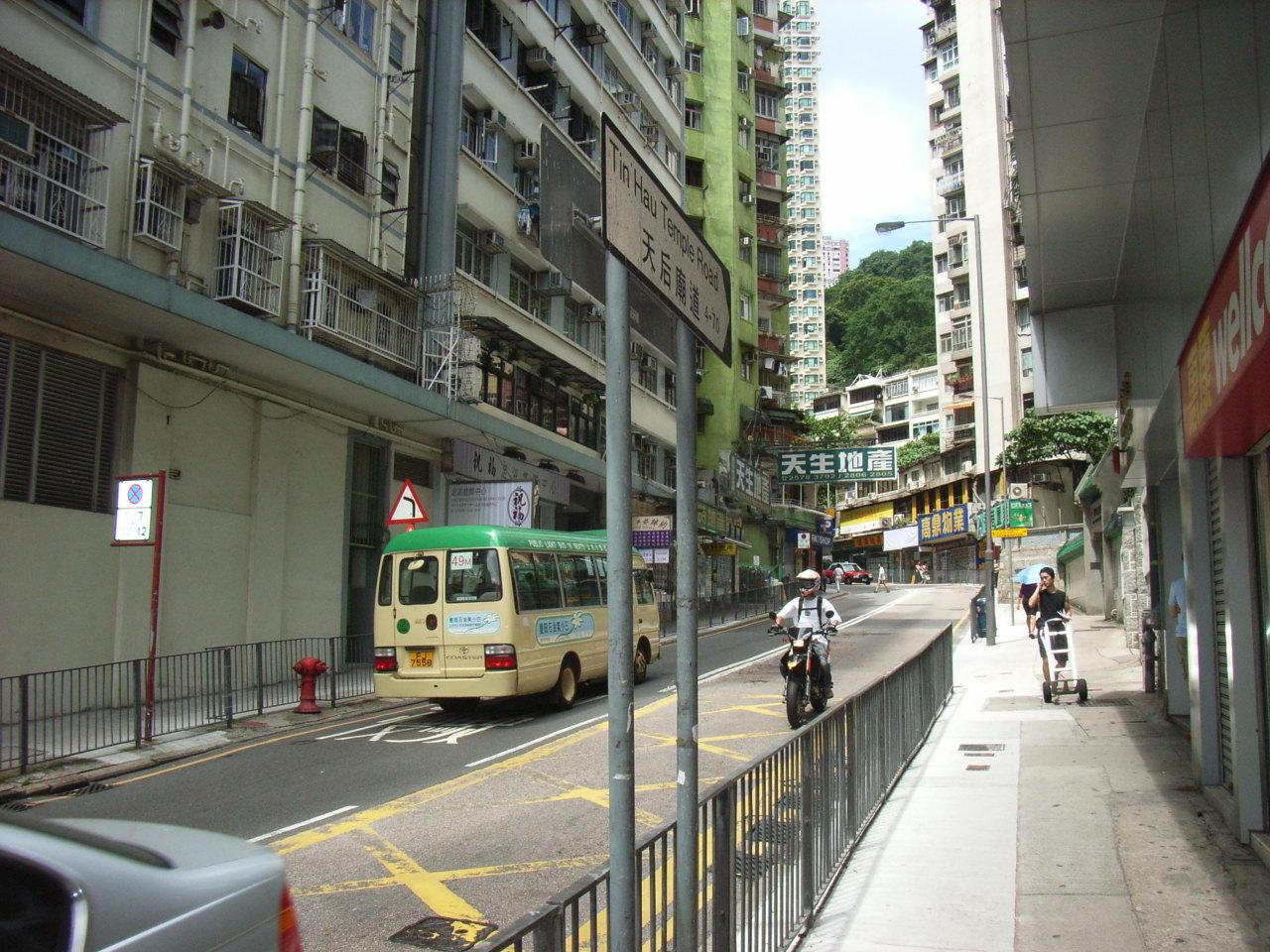
Tin Hau Temple Road

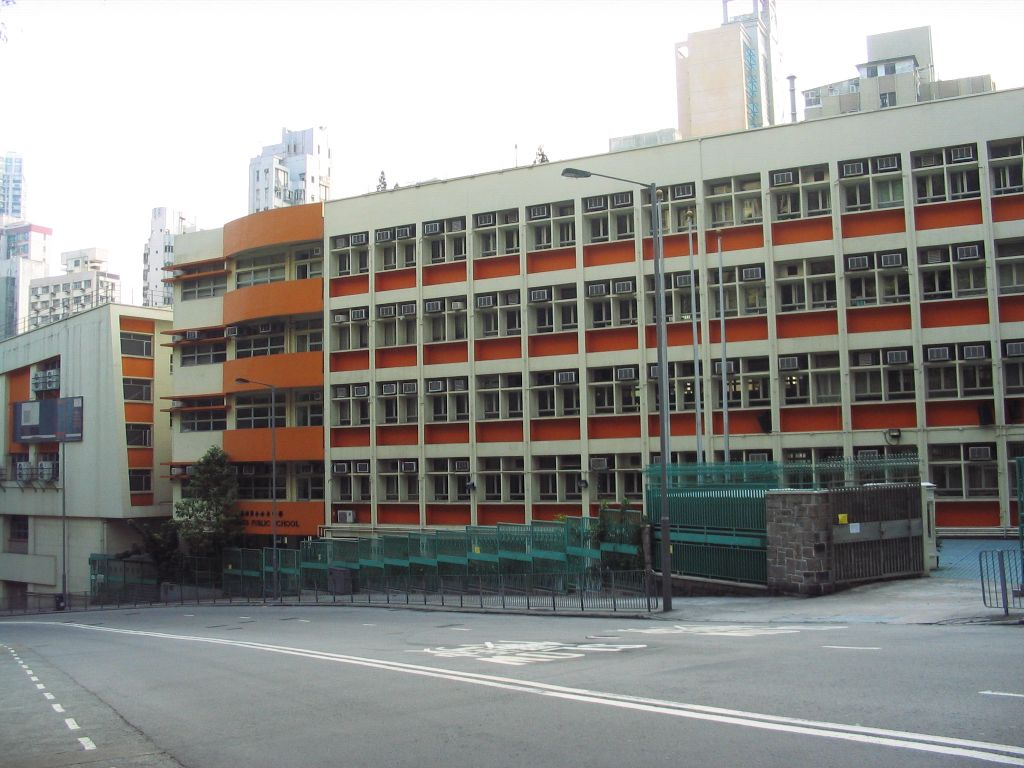
Belilios Public School, 51 Tin Hau Temple Road

Tin Hau Temple Road (Chinese: 天后廟道) is a road starting in Causeway Bay near Tin Hau MTR station with a large portion being in the North Point Mid-Levels on Hong Kong Island, in Hong Kong.

Starting from King's Road on the west, the road then slopes up, before being mostly flat, until it ends in a dead end after a roundabout. A number of intersections connect Tin Hau Temple Road to other roads, such as Fortress Hill Road, Cloud View Road and Pak Fuk Road.

== History ==
The Tin Hau Temple in Causeway Bay was built in the early eighteenth century. On November 28, 1930, the Hong Kong government gazetted the road in front of the Tin Hau Temple as "Tin Hau Temple Road".

== See also ==
- Tin Hau Temple, Causeway Bay
