= Fortress Hill Road =

Road in Hong Kong

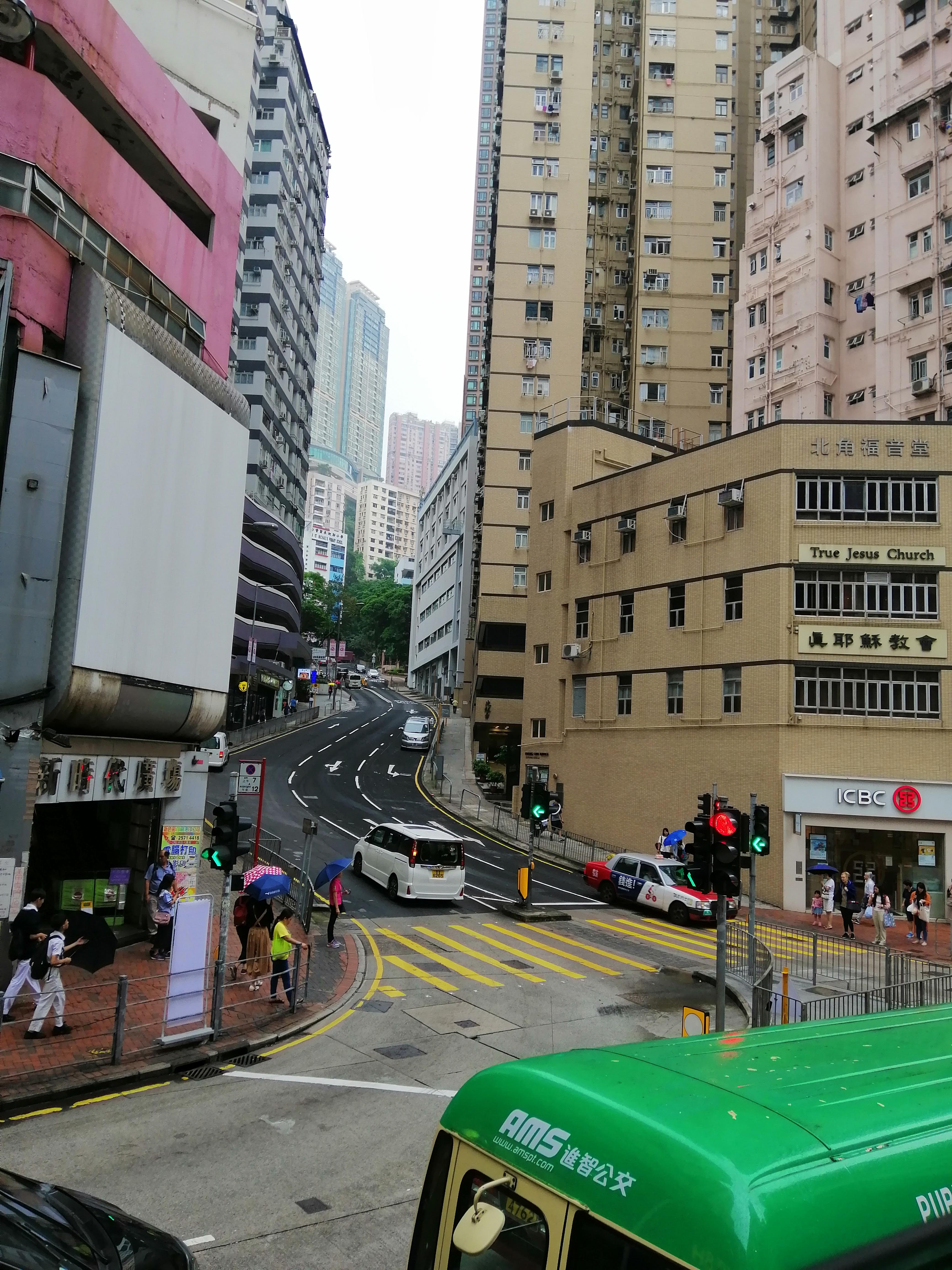
The uphill road is Fortress Hill Road

Fortress Hill Road (Chinese: 炮台山道) is the main road between Fortress Hill and Braemar Hill in Hong Kong Island, starting from the junction of King's Road and Tai Keung Street (大強街) in the north and ending at the junction of Tin Hau Temple Road near Cloud View Road in the south. The road has a maximum slope of 1:8, and is known as the longevity slope in the area.

== Accidents ==
A horrific traffic accident occurred on Fortress Hill Road on 29 December 1977. A 75-year-old woman was hit by a taxi, which then drove away without paying any attention to her. A CMB No. 41 bus was following the taxi and the driver did not notice the accident. The bus rolled the woman under the bus and entangled her on the axle. However, the driver and dozens of passengers on the bus did not notice anything unusual. As a result, the woman was dragged for more than three kilometres before being discovered by the driver of another bus. By then, the woman had been crushed to pieces.

On March 5, 2023, a taxi went downhill along Fortress Hill Road. It was suspected that it had malfunction on its braking system and crashed into King's Road near Tai Keung Street. It first knocked down a pedestrian at the King's Road intersection and injured him. It then rushed forward and knocked down two female pedestrians a few meters. During the process, it hit the traffic lights and iron railings. The front of the car was severely damaged and parts were scattered on the ground. Afterwards, the taxi driver and passengers in the car also reported feeling unwell and waited for rescue in the taxi. Several ambulances were later called to the scene and sent 5 injured people to Ruttonjee Hospital for treatment, and 2 more seriously injured people were sent to Eastern Hospital for emergency treatment.

== Gallery ==
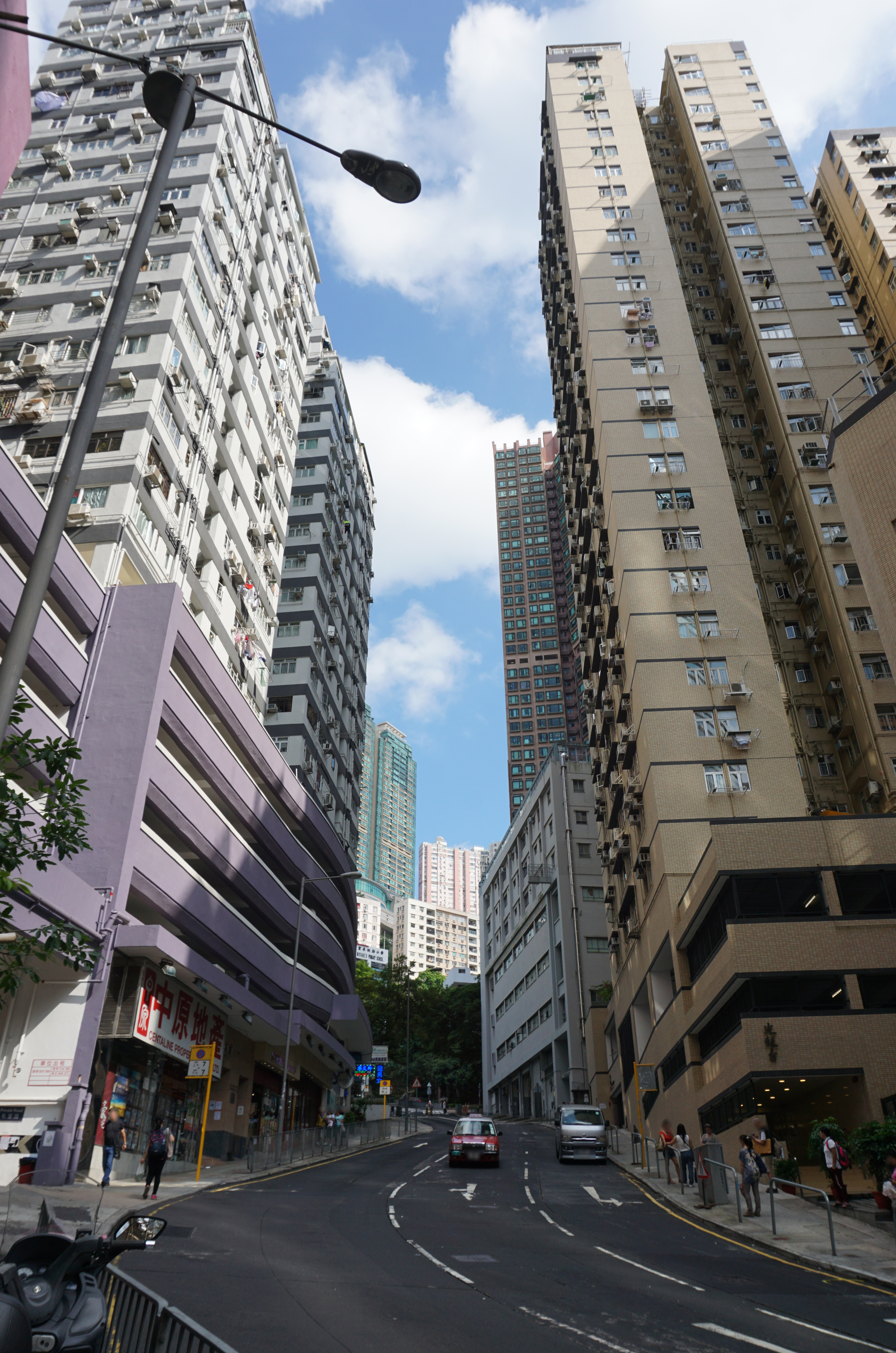
Fortress Hill Road, North Section

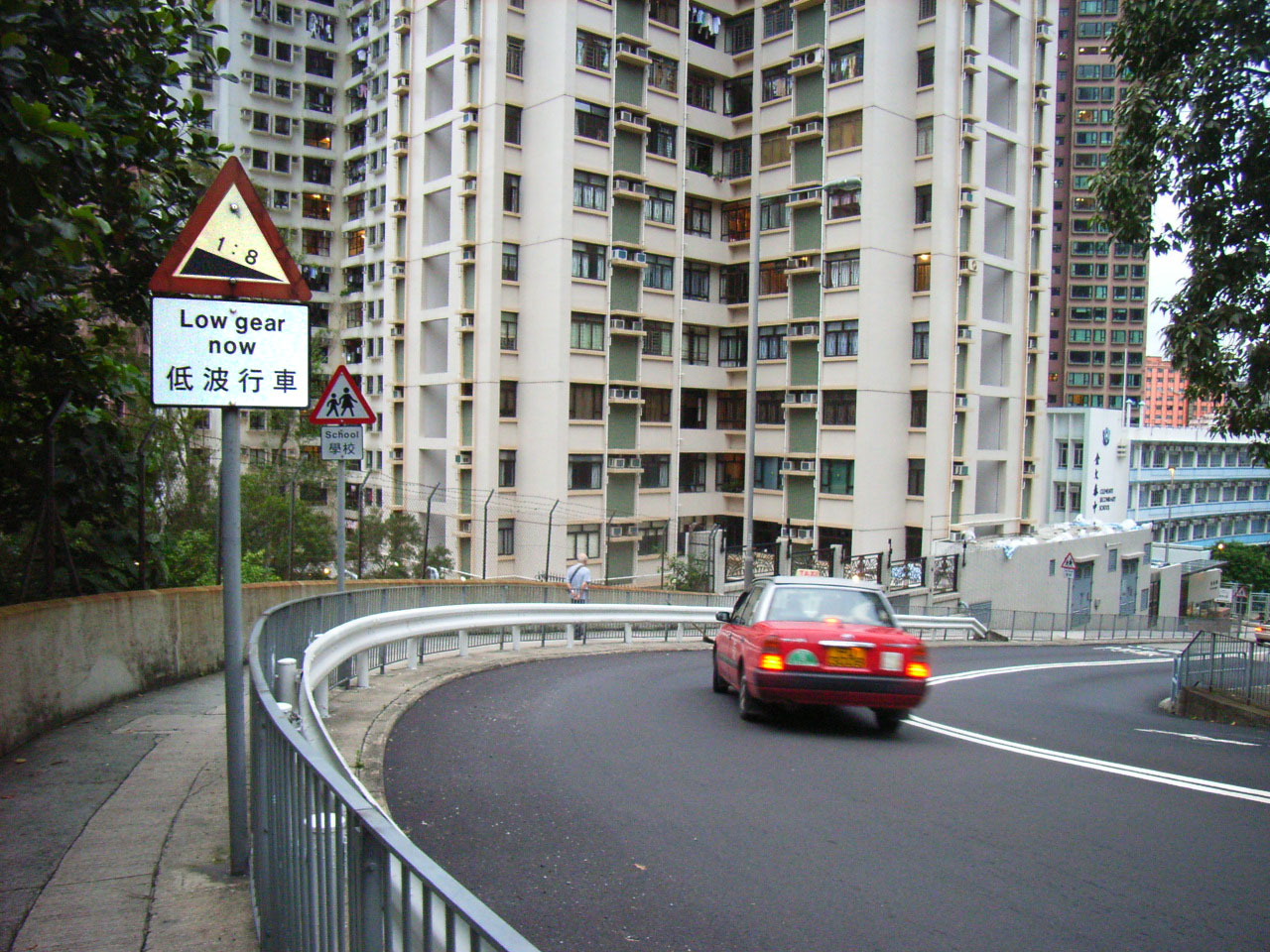
Fortress Hill Road, South Section

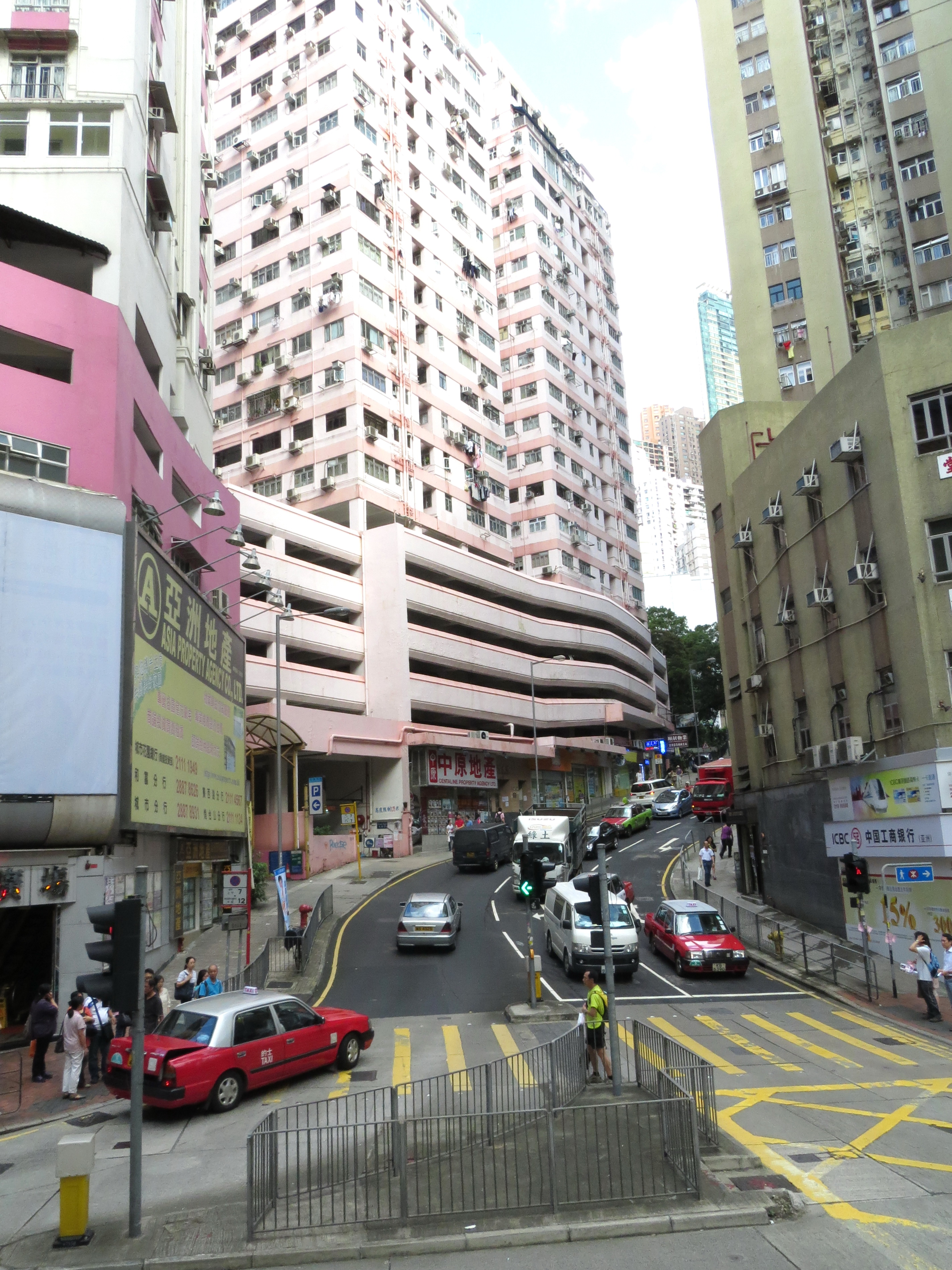
Fortress Hill Road, North End
