= Tin Hau, Hong Kong =

Area of Wan Chai District, Hong Kong

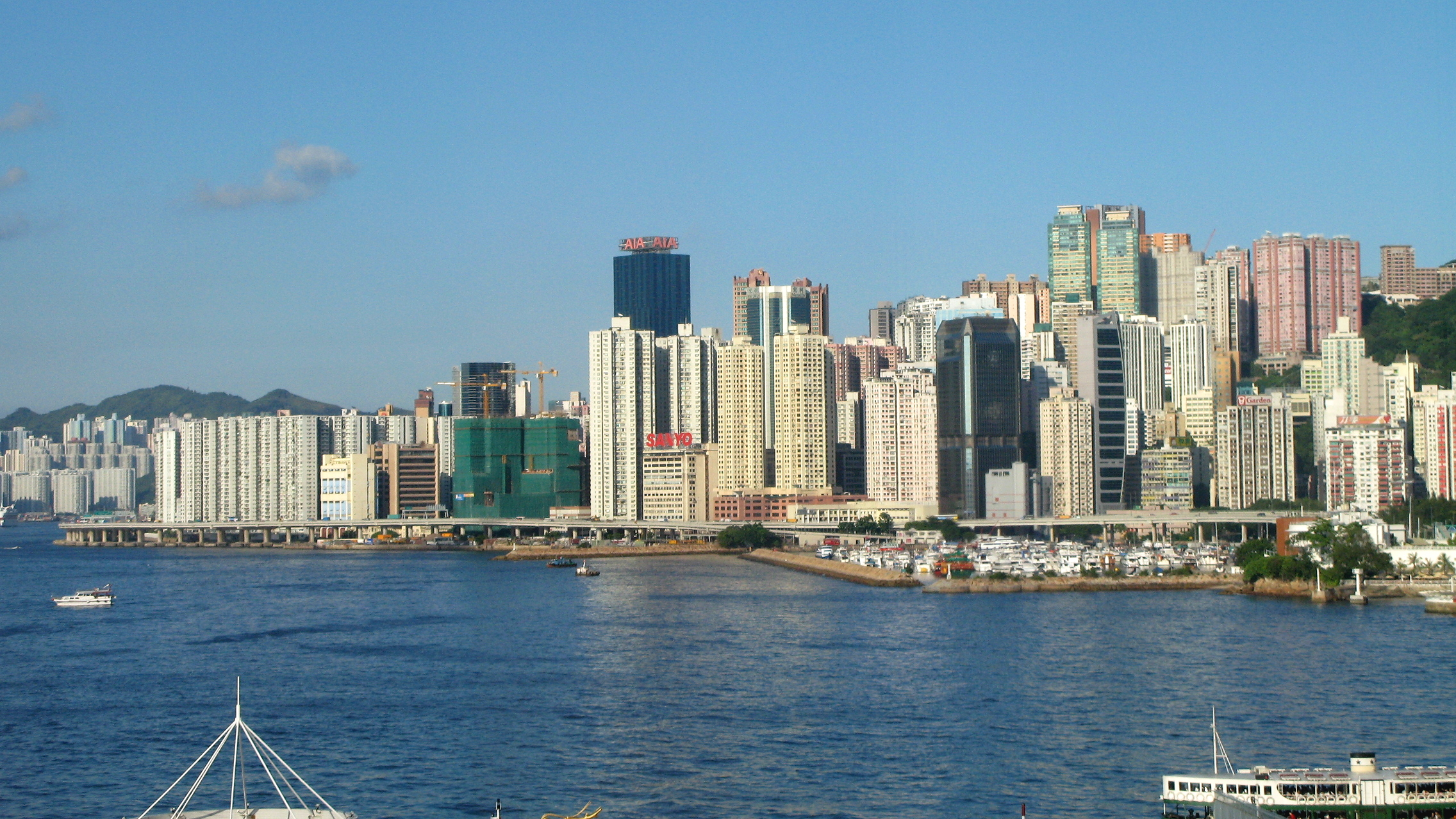
View of Tin Hau from Victoria Harbour.

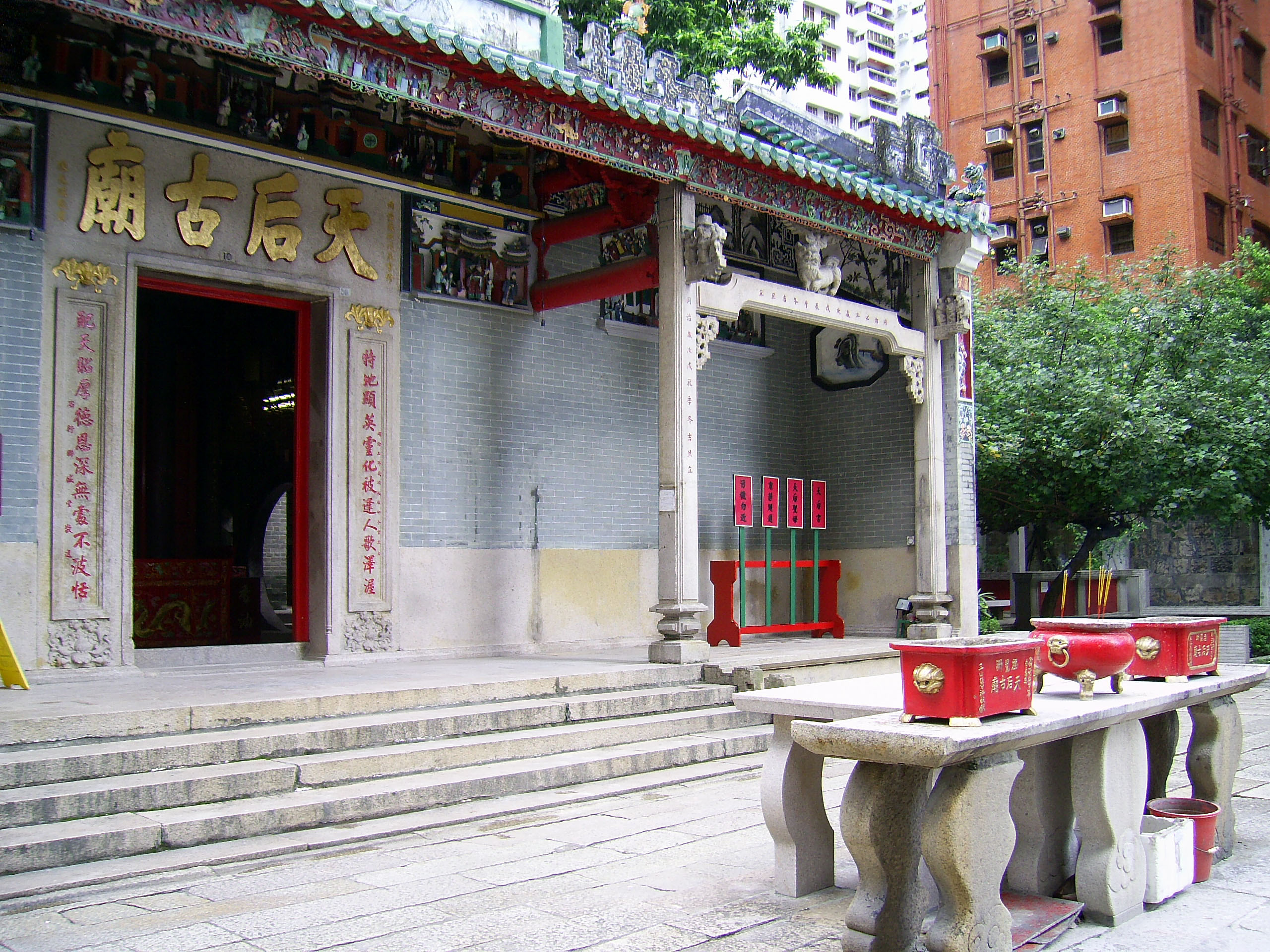
The "Red Incense Burner" in front of the Tin Hau Temple. The villagers believed it was the manifestation of the Tin Hau .

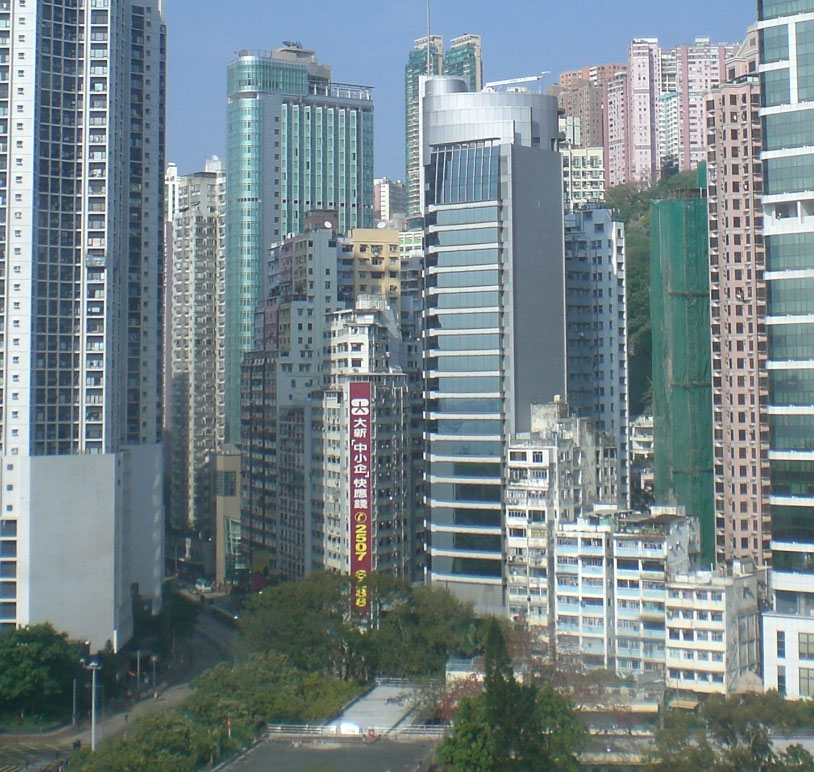
Buildings in Tin Hau.

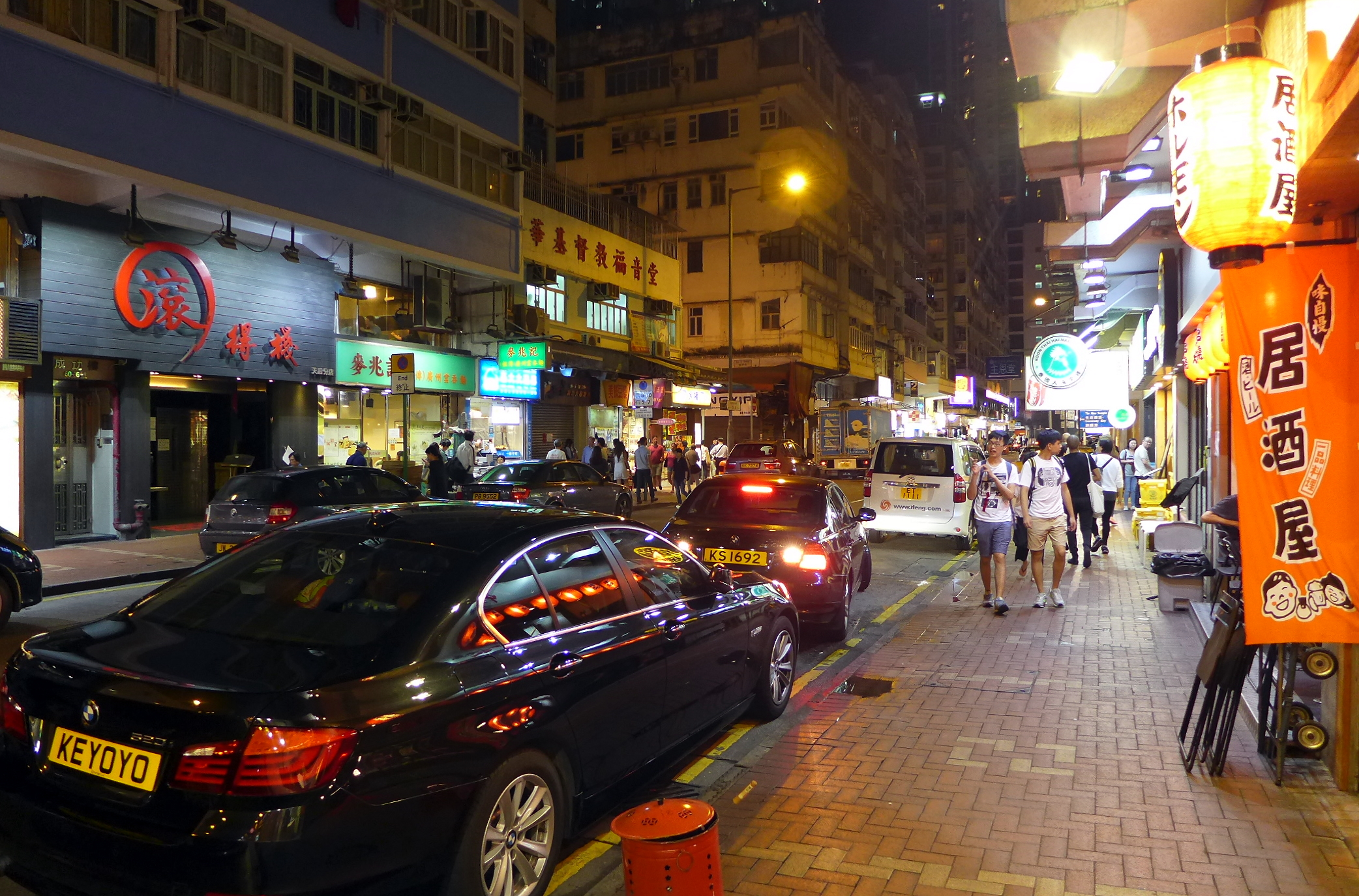
Tin Hau section of Electric Road.

Tin Hau (Chinese: 天后; Jyutping: tin^{1} hau^{6}) is an area in Wan Chai District, on the north side of Hong Kong Island, in Hong Kong.

Tin Hau is not a formalised district. The name arose from Tin Hau station, so named due to its proximity to the Causeway Bay Tin Hau Temple; and as the use of the name Causeway Bay shifts eastwards due to Causeway Bay Tram Terminus and later Causeway Bay station.

The term "Tin Hau" is also used to describe the location of places like Queen's College (beside Tin Hau MTR station) and the Central Library and the Causeway Bay Sports Ground, which is located in Wan Chai. Government offices and facilities such as Causeway Bay Market are located there.

== Places ==
=== Streets ===
- Electric Road
- King's Road (partially)
- Watson Road

=== Public facilities ===
- Hong Kong Central Library (Tin Hau MTR Exit B's name)
- Victoria Park (Tin Hau MTR Exit A's name)
- Causeway Bay Sports Ground
- Causeway Bay Market (No. 142 Electric Road)
- Causeway Bay Community Centre
- East Coast Park

=== Hotels ===
- L'hotel Causeway Bay Harbour View
- Causeway Bay Metro Park Hotel
- TUVE

=== Schools ===
- Queen's College (The first boys school in Hong Kong)
- Belilios Public School (The first girls school in Hong Kong. This school is still in Eastern District, as it was excluded from a constituency boundaries change from Eastern District to Wan Chai District in 2016.)
- Causeway Bay Victoria Kindergarten and International Nursery (An IB International Kindergarten)

=== Estates ===
- The Pavilla Hill
- Park Towers
- Dragon Court
- Victoria Centre

=== Others ===
- Tin Hau Temple
- Ngo Wong Temple (岳王古廟) (No. 150-160 Electric Road)

== Transport ==
Tin Hau is served by the Tin Hau MTR station. Bus service is available. The Hong Kong tramway runs through the neighborhood. Tin Hau is walking distance from nearby Fortress Hill and Causeway Bay station.

== See also ==
- Tin Hau (constituency)
