= Tin Hau station =

MTR station on Hong Kong Island

Tin Hau 天后
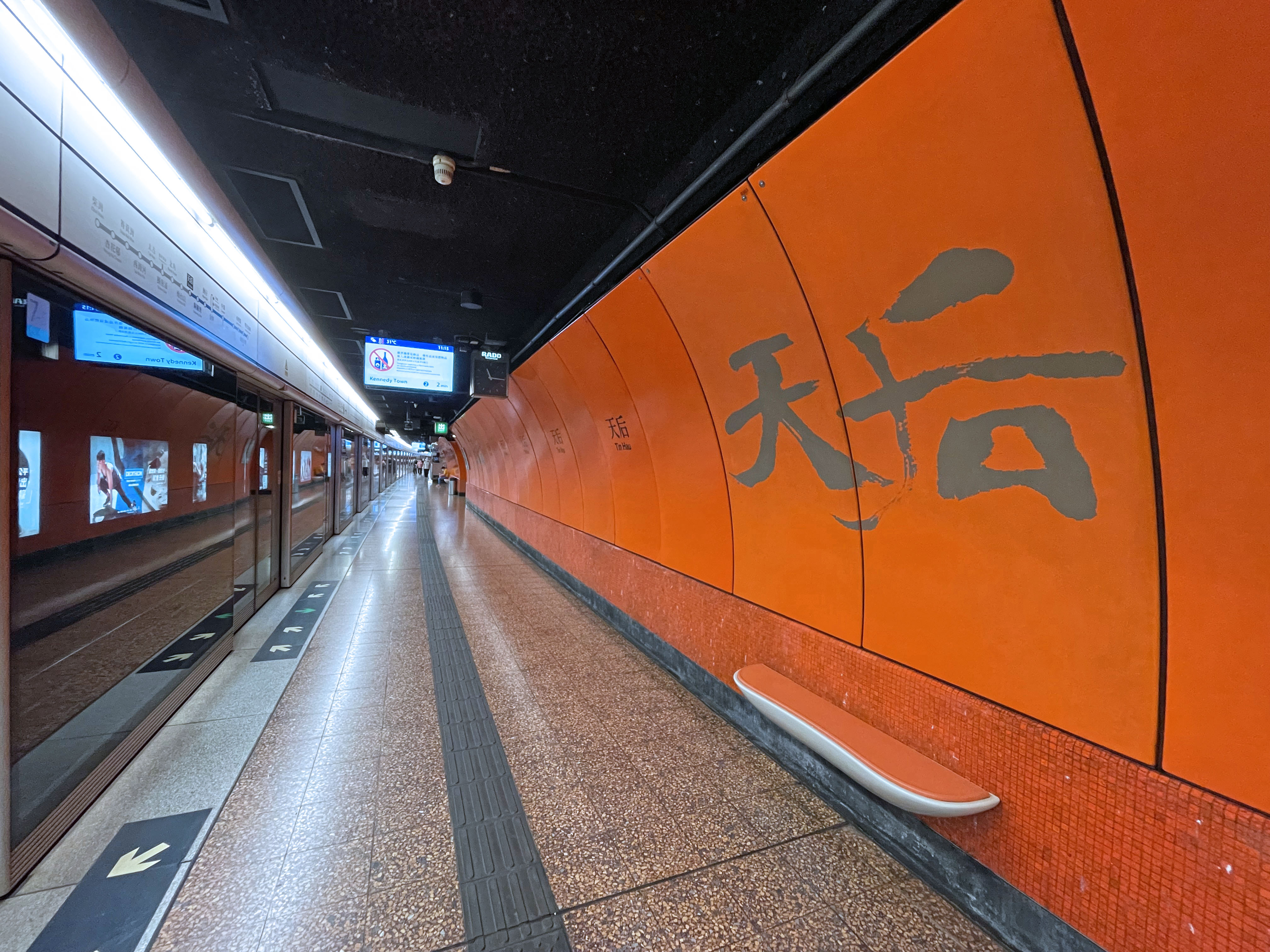
- Platform 2, in May 2021

Chinese name
- Chinese: 天后
- Cantonese Yale: Tīnhauh
- Literal meaning: Celestial Empress
Transcriptions
Standard Mandarin
- Hanyu Pinyin: Tiānhòu
Yue: Cantonese
- Yale Romanization: Tīnhauh
- Jyutping: Tin1hau6

General information
- Location: Intersection between King's Road and Causeway Road, Causeway Bay; Wan Chai District, Hong Kong
- Coordinates: 22°16′58″N 114°11′30″E
- System: MTR rapid transit station
- Owner: MTR Corporation
- Operator: MTR Corporation
- Line: Island line
- Platforms: 2 split level side platforms
- Tracks: 2
- Connections: Tram; Bus, minibus

Construction
- Structure type: Underground
- Platform levels: 2
- Accessible: Yes (with stairlift)

Other information
- Station code: TIH

History
- Opened: 31 May 1985; 41 years ago
- Former names: Causeway Bay

Services
Preceding station	MTR	Following station
Causeway Bay towards Kennedy Town	Island line	Fortress Hill towards Chai Wan
Track layout
Location
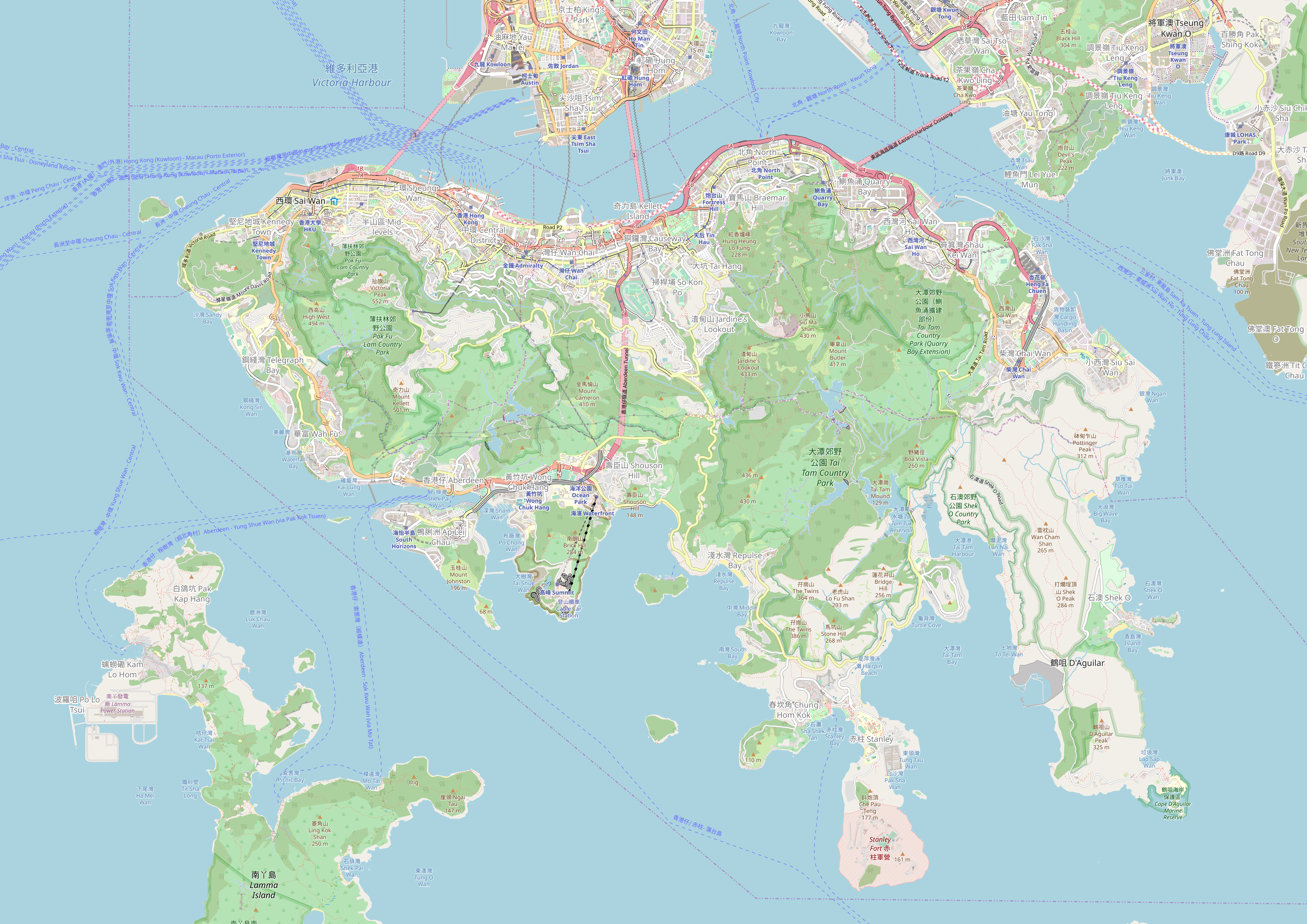
- Location within MTR Location within Hong Kong urban core Location within Hong Kong Island

Tin Hau (Chinese: 天后) is a station on the Island line of the MTR rapid transit system in Hong Kong. Its livery is neon orange.

== Location ==
Like all other Island line stations, Tin Hau is located along the northern shore of Hong Kong Island. Named after the nearby Tin Hau Temple, the station is actually at the core of the Causeway Bay neighbourhood; however the station's presence has caused the surrounding area to be colloquially called "Tin Hau".

The station lies to the east of Victoria Park, with the Citicorp Centre to the north. The Hong Kong Central Library and Lin Fa Kung Garden are to the south of the station, as is the Causeway Bay Sports Ground.

== History ==
Tin Hau station was part of the original plan for the MTR, dating back to the Hong Kong Mass Transport Study in 1967. It was not, however, in the Modified Initial System, which laid out the first few phases of the MTR system. Construction on the Island line began in 1981, with the first section of the line, which included Tin Hau, opening on 31 May 1985. The construction contract was awarded to Bachy Soletanche. The station's platform and concourse were also constructed by Kumagai Gumi. The Causeway Bay Magistracy was demolished to make way for the station, with the magistrates' courts moving to the Wanchai Tower. From 2000, MTR retrofitted platform screen doors at thirty underground stations, one of them being Tin Hau; the project was finished in 2006.

== Station layout ==
Due to the limited space beneath Causeway Road and Hennessy Road, under which the Island line runs, Tin Hau utilises a stacked platform layout. Eastbound trains using platform 1 stop on the upper level, while westbound trains using platform 2 stop on the lower level. In addition, there are two underground levels above the platforms: the concourse containing faregates and shops and the walkway which connects Exits A1-A2 and B.

G	Ground level	Exits, Transportation Interchange
-	Walkway	MTRShops; Walkways to exits
L1	Concourse	Customer Service
L1	Concourse	Hang Seng Bank, vending machines, ATM
L3; Upper Platform	Side platform, doors will open on the left
L3; Upper Platform	Platform 1	Island line towards Chai Wan (Fortress Hill) →
L5; Lower Platform	Side platform, doors will open on the right
L5; Lower Platform	Platform 2	← Island line towards Kennedy Town (Causeway Bay)

=== Entrances and exits ===
- A1: King's Road
- A2: Victoria Park, Causeway Bay Market
- B: Hong Kong Central Library
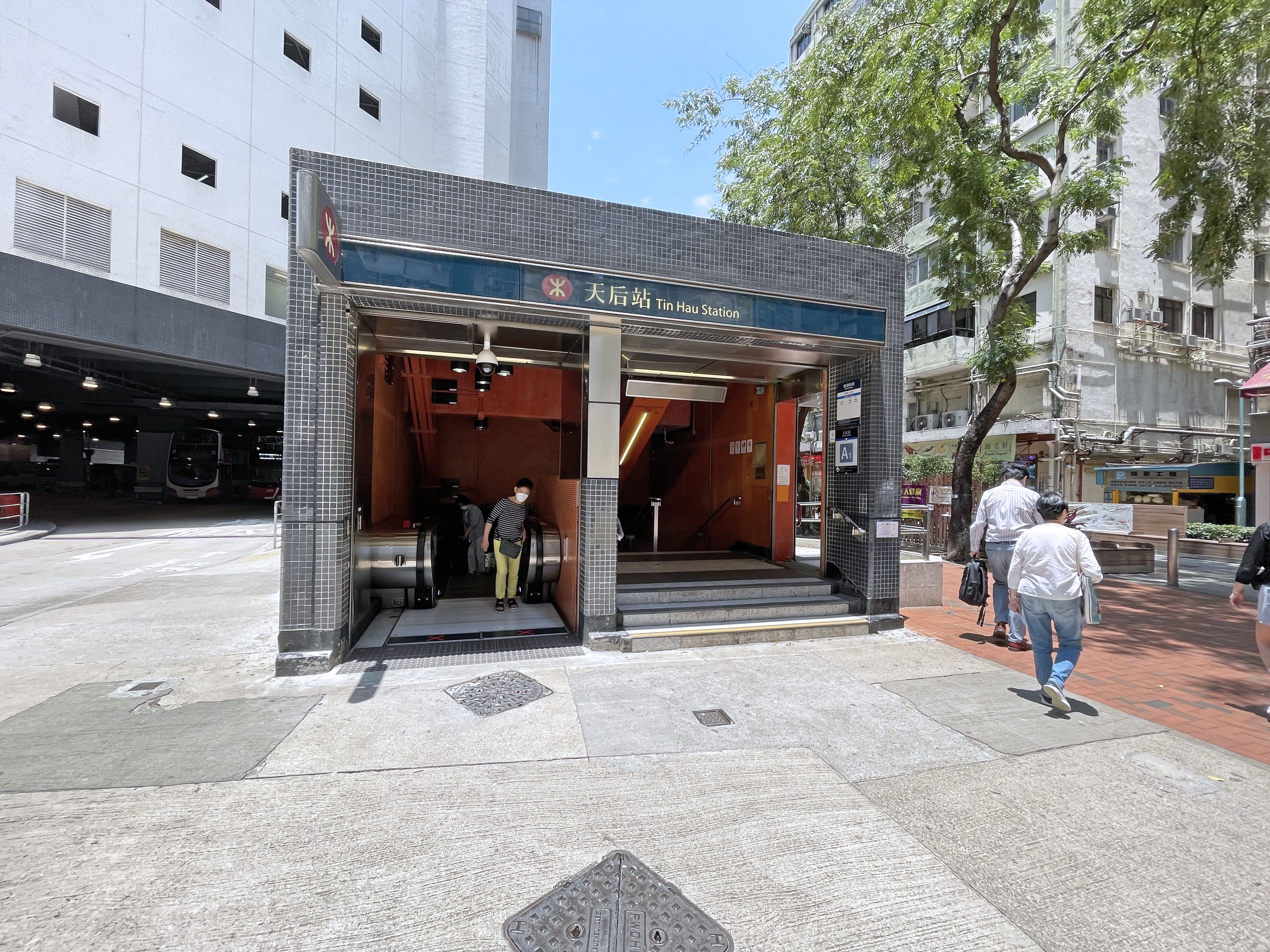
Exit A1

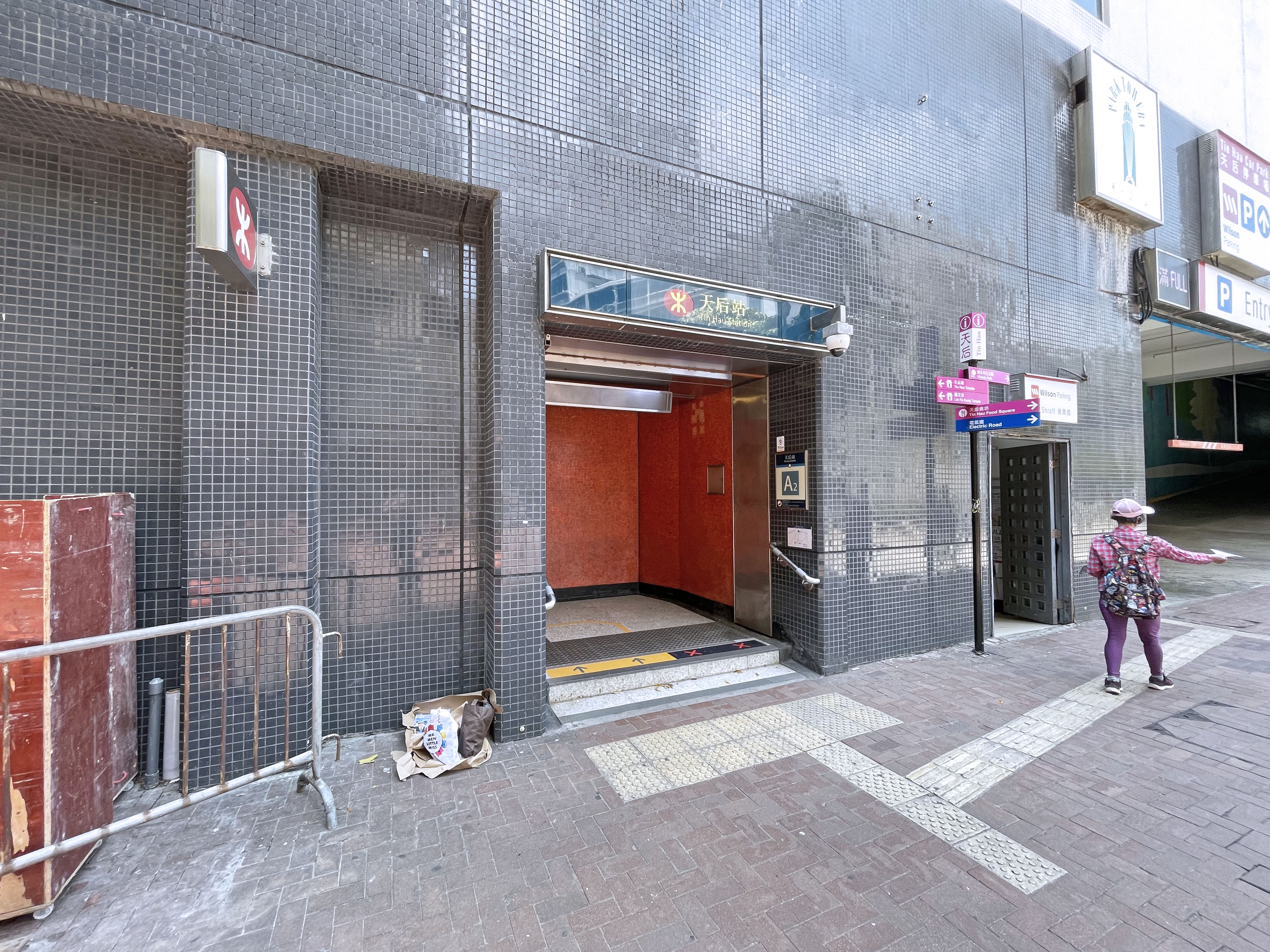
Exit A2

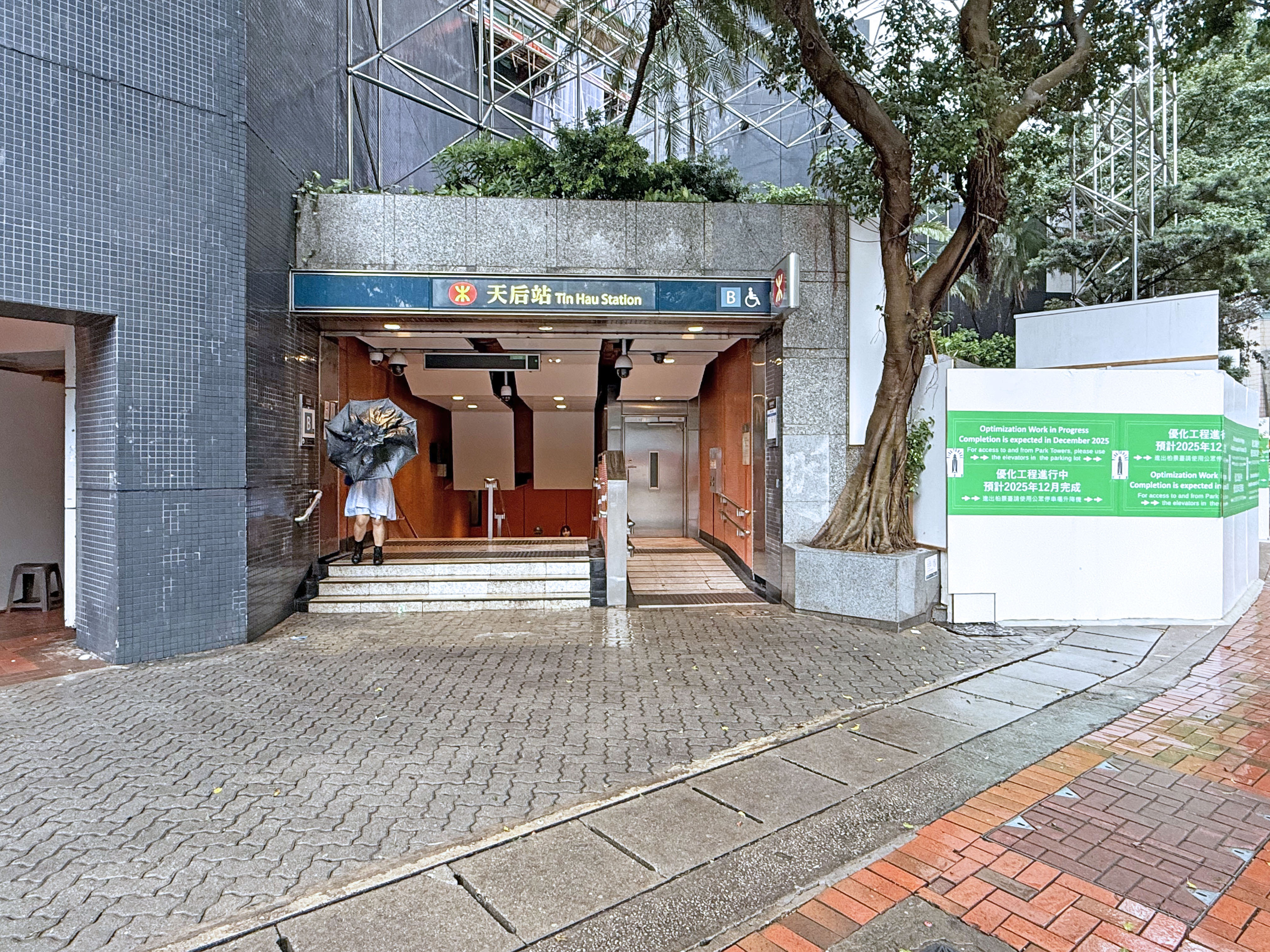
Exit B

== Gallery ==
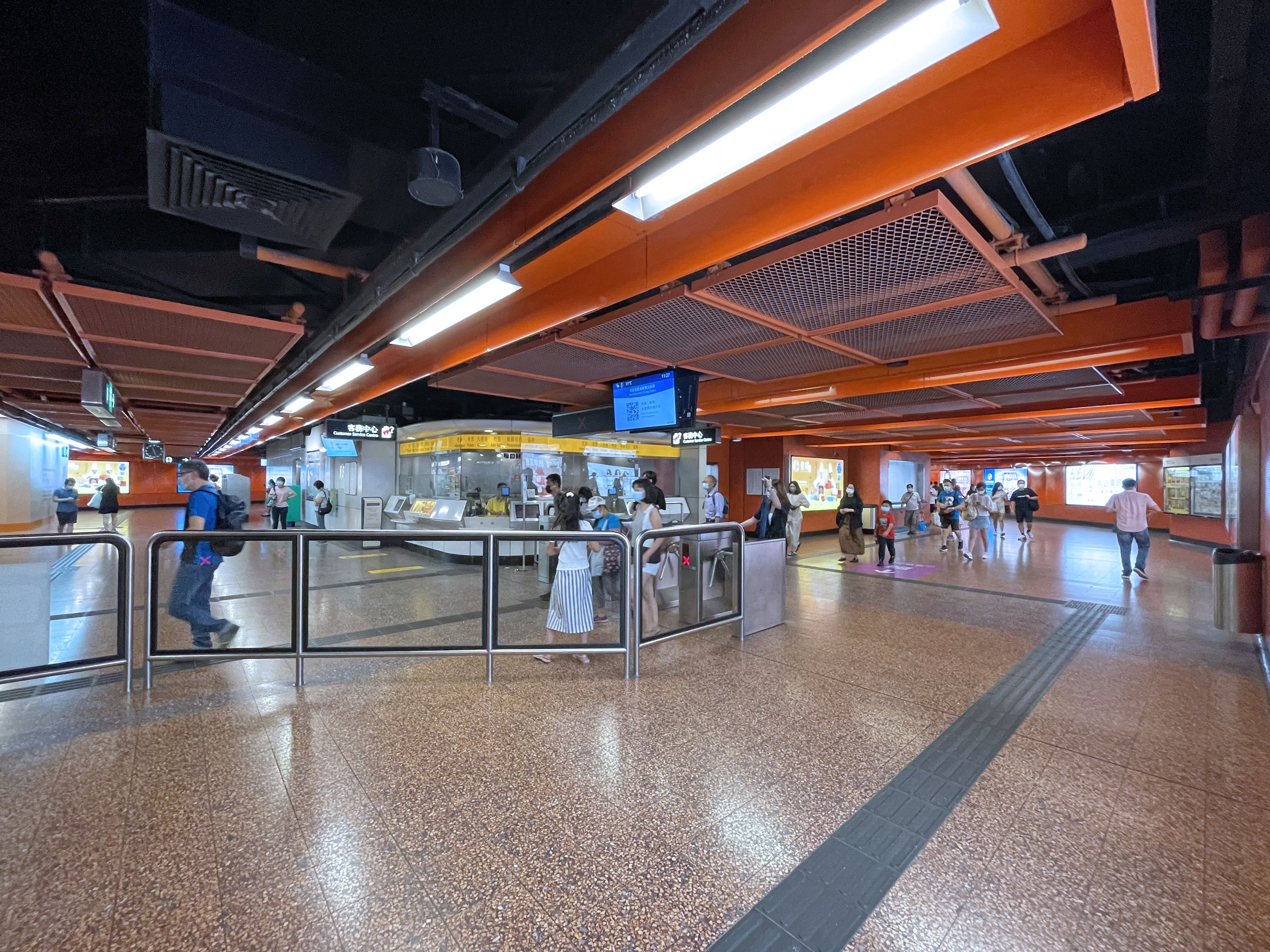
Concourse

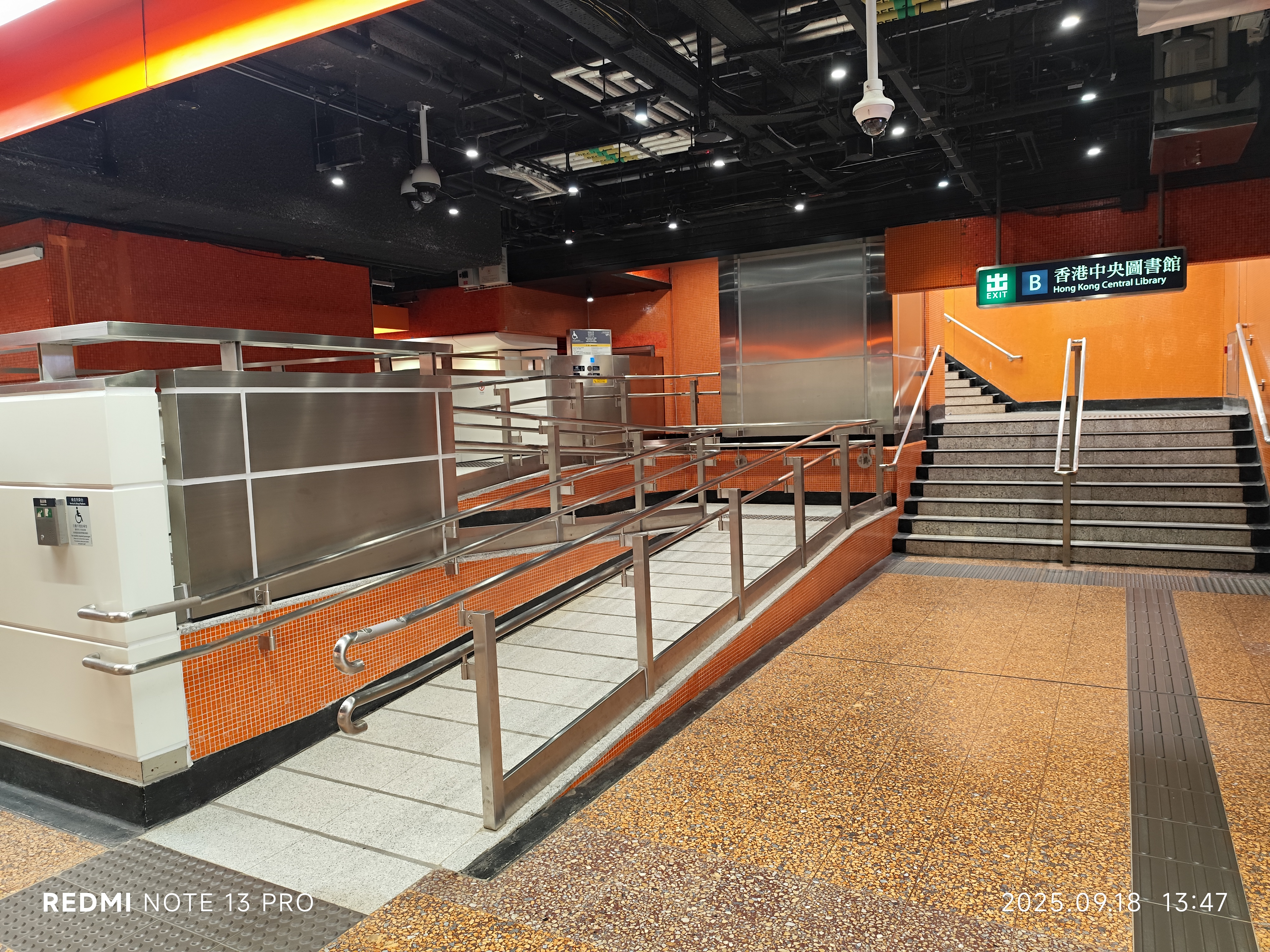
Exit B ramp and stairs

== Services ==
Tin Hau station acts as an interchange between MTR rapid transit and local buses.
