= Michael Wright (architect) =

Hong Kong architect (1912–2018)

Michael Wright CMG, RIBA, FRICS

Hong Kong Commissioner in London
- In office 1969–1973
- Preceded by: Patrick Cardinall Mason Sedgwick
- Succeeded by: Samuel Tedford Kidd

Director of Public Works
- In office 1963–1969
- Preceded by: Allan Inglis
- Succeeded by: James Jeavons Robson

President of the Hong Kong Institute of Architects
- In office 1958–1959
- Preceded by: Su Gin Djih
- Succeeded by: Harold Graham Fector Robinson

Personal details
- Born: 19 September 1912 Hong Kong
- Died: 26 January 2018 (aged 105) London, England
- Spouse: Ethel Surtees
- Relations: Sir Denis Wright (brother, 1911–2005)
- Parent(s): Arthur Edgar Wright (1880–1949); Margery Hepworth Chapman (1888–1973)
- Education: Brentwood School

Michael Wright
- Traditional Chinese: 鄔勵德
- Simplified Chinese: 邬励德
Transcriptions
Standard Mandarin
- Hanyu Pinyin: Wū Lìdé
- Wade–Giles: Wu^{1} Li^{4}-tê^{2}
- IPA: [ú lî.tɤ̌]
Yue: Cantonese
- Yale Romanization: Wū Laihdāk
- Jyutping: wu1 lai6 dak1
- IPA: [wu˥ lɐj˨.tɐk̚˥]

Alec Michael John Wright, CMG (Chinese: 鄔勵德; 19 September 1912 – 26 January 2018) was a chartered surveyor and Director of Public Works of Hong Kong. He was a longtime colonial civil servant and chief architect of the Public Works Department. He was also an official member of the Legislative Council and Urban Council. He was responsible for many infrastructure and housing projects and advocated for private bathroom and kitchen in every unit of the housing estate which is known as the "Wright Principle". He was the founding member and president of the Hong Kong Institute of Architects.

== Biography ==
Wright was born in Hong Kong on 19 September 1912 into a civil servant family. He was educated at the Brentwood School in the United Kingdom and became an architect. He joined the Hong Kong government in 1938 and began to work at the former Public Works Department. He was interned during the Japanese occupation of Hong Kong.

After the war, Wright became the chief architect of the Public Works Department and played an instrumental role in the massive effort to house the millions of refugees fleeing to Hong Kong from China. The first generation of public housing estates, built in haste, resembled army barracks, and had shared bathrooms. In 1952 he designed the first public rental housing estate with private bathrooms and kitchens, at Sheung Li Uk, for the Hong Kong Housing Society, in which his design became known as the "Wright Principle". He was also founding member and president of the Hong Kong Institute of Architects in 1958.

In 1963, he became Director of Public Works in which he served until 1969. In this capacity, Wright was also an official member of the Legislative Council and Urban Council.

In 1969, he was appointed Hong Kong Commissioner in London. He retired from the civil service in 1973. Hong Kong Housing Society's Lai Tak Tsuen in Tai Hang, built in 1975 and 1976, was named after Wright's Chinese name.

He resided in Knightsbridge, London after his retirement. He commented on Hong Kong affairs occasionally, including the proposed demolition of the Government Hill in 2012. Wright died in January 2018 at the age of 105.

== See also ==
- Architecture of Hong Kong
- Public housing in Hong Kong
- Lai Tak Tsuen
- Hong Kong Club

Non-profit organization positions
Preceded by Su Gin Djih	President of Hong Kong Institute of Architects; 1958	Succeeded by Harold Graham Fector Robinson
Government offices
Preceded by Allan Inglis	Director of Public Works; 1963–1969	Succeeded by James Jeavons Robson
Preceded by Patrick Cardinall Mason Sedgwick	Hong Kong Commissioner in London; 1969–1973	Succeeded by Samuel Tedford Kidd
