= Lai Tak Tsuen =

Housing estate in Tai Hang, Hong Kong

Coordinates: 22.278156°N 114.194491°E

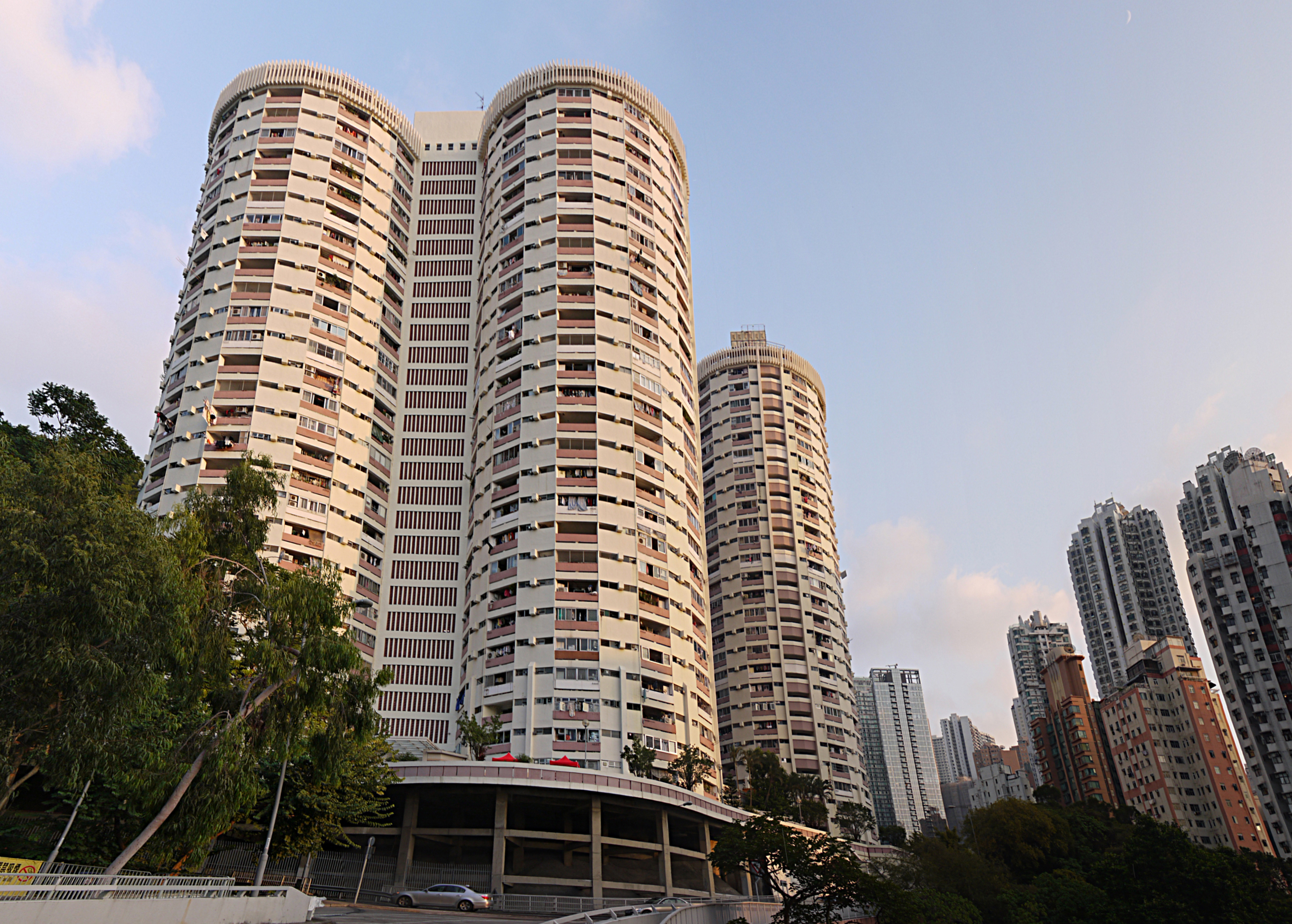
- Lai Tak Tsuen
- Interactive map of Lai Tak Tsuen

General information
- Location: Wan Chai
- Category: Subsidized Housing: Rental Unit
- No. of blocks: 8
- No. of units: 2677

Construction
- Constructed: 1975－1976

Other information
- Governing body: Hong Kong Housing Society

Lai Tak Tsuen
- Chinese: 勵德邨
- Cantonese Yale: laih dāk chyūn
- Literal meaning: encourage virtue estate
Transcriptions
Yue: Cantonese
- Yale Romanization: laih dāk chyūn
- Jyutping: lai6 dak1 cyun1

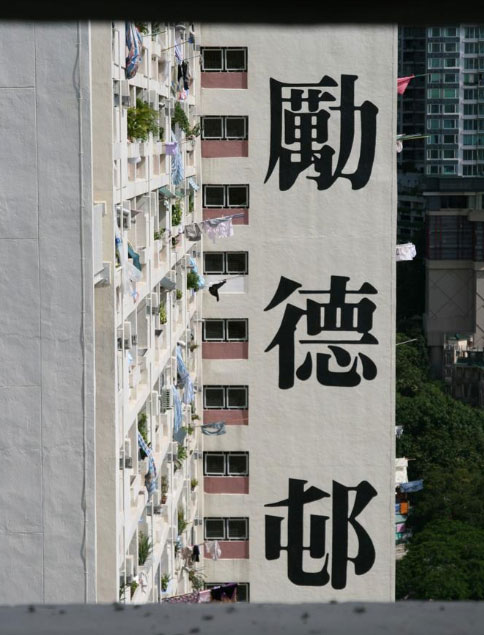
Lai Tak Tsuen

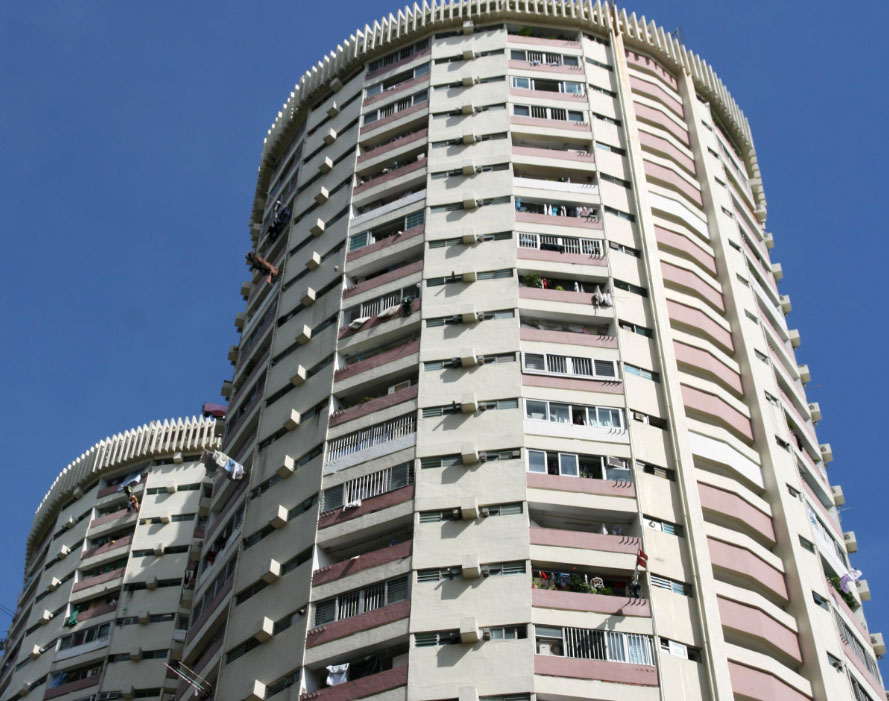
Lai Tak Tsuen

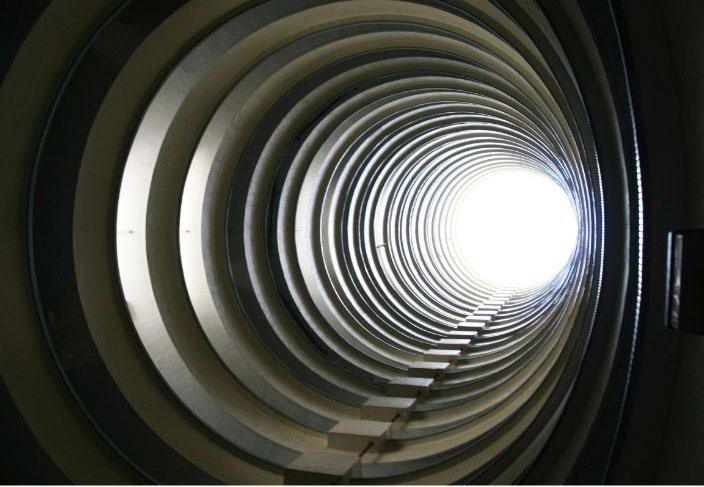
Lai Tak Tsuen

Lai Tak Tsuen (Chinese: 勵德邨) is a public housing estate at 2 – 38 Lai Tak Tsuen Road, Tai Hang, Causeway Bay, Hong Kong. Built in 1975, it is one of the first public housing developments in Hong Kong. It was the second self-funded rental project of the Hong Kong Housing Society. The housing estate was named after a Hong Kong government officer, Michael Wright, who had served the Government of Hong Kong for more than 30 years.

== History ==
The Hong Kong Housing Society announced its plan to build the housing estate in January 1969. Its construction was originally planned to be finished in 1972, but was delayed by a landslide. As a result, the first building, Tsuen Wing Lau, was completed in May 1975. The rest was completed in 1976.

The housing estate was an award-winning design in the 1970s.

In September 1999, Lai Tak Tsuen was awarded the ISO 9001 certification by the Hong Kong Quality Assurance Agency for its design and provision of property management services.

From 2002 to 2005, Lai Tak Tsuen was one of the ten public housing estates with the lowest average volume of waste produced; hence, it was commended in the Waste Reduction Credit Scheme organised by the Hong Kong Housing Authority.

In 2016, a circular atrium of Lai Tak Tsuen was used as a location for the filming of the live-action film Ghost in the Shell. The unique architectural design of the building void has also featured in a number of TV commercials and the 2004 Fruit Chan film Dumplings. The buildings' facades are similar to the Pearl Bank Apartments in Singapore.

== Configuration ==
The estate consists of three houses, i.e. high-rise blocks of flats, with 2,677 flats.

The population of the housing estate is currently 11,140. Other than residential blocks, the estate also provides carparks, shops, market stalls, a kindergarten, a children's centre, a youth centre, an elderly centre, a library, basketball court and a children's playground.

=== Houses ===
Lai Tak Tsuen consists of three buildings:

- Lai Kit Lau (勵潔樓) which is at 38 Lai Tak Tsuen Road,
- Tak Chuen Lau (德全樓) which is at 36 Lai Tak Tsuen Road and
- Tsuen Wing Lau (邨榮樓) which is at 16 Lai Tak Tsuen Road.

Two of the buildings, Lai Kit Lau and Tak Chuen Lau, in Lai Tak Tsuen are Hong Kong's only public rental buildings having bicyclindrical design.

== Demographics ==
According to the 2016 population by-census, Lai Tak Tsuen has a population of 6,700. 98% of the population is of Chinese ethnicity. The median monthly domestic household income is HK$16,550.

== Politics ==
Lai Tak Tsuen is located in Tin Hau constituency of the Wan Chai District Council. It was formerly represented by Chan Yuk-lam, who was elected in the 2019 elections until July 2021.

== Education ==
Lai Tak Tsuen is in Primary One Admission (POA) School Net 12. Within the school net are multiple aided schools (operated independently but funded with government money) and the following government schools: Hennessy Road Government Primary School and Sir Ellis Kadoorie (Sookunpo) Primary School.
