= Lin Fa Temple =

Coordinates: 22°16′46″N 114°11′35″E

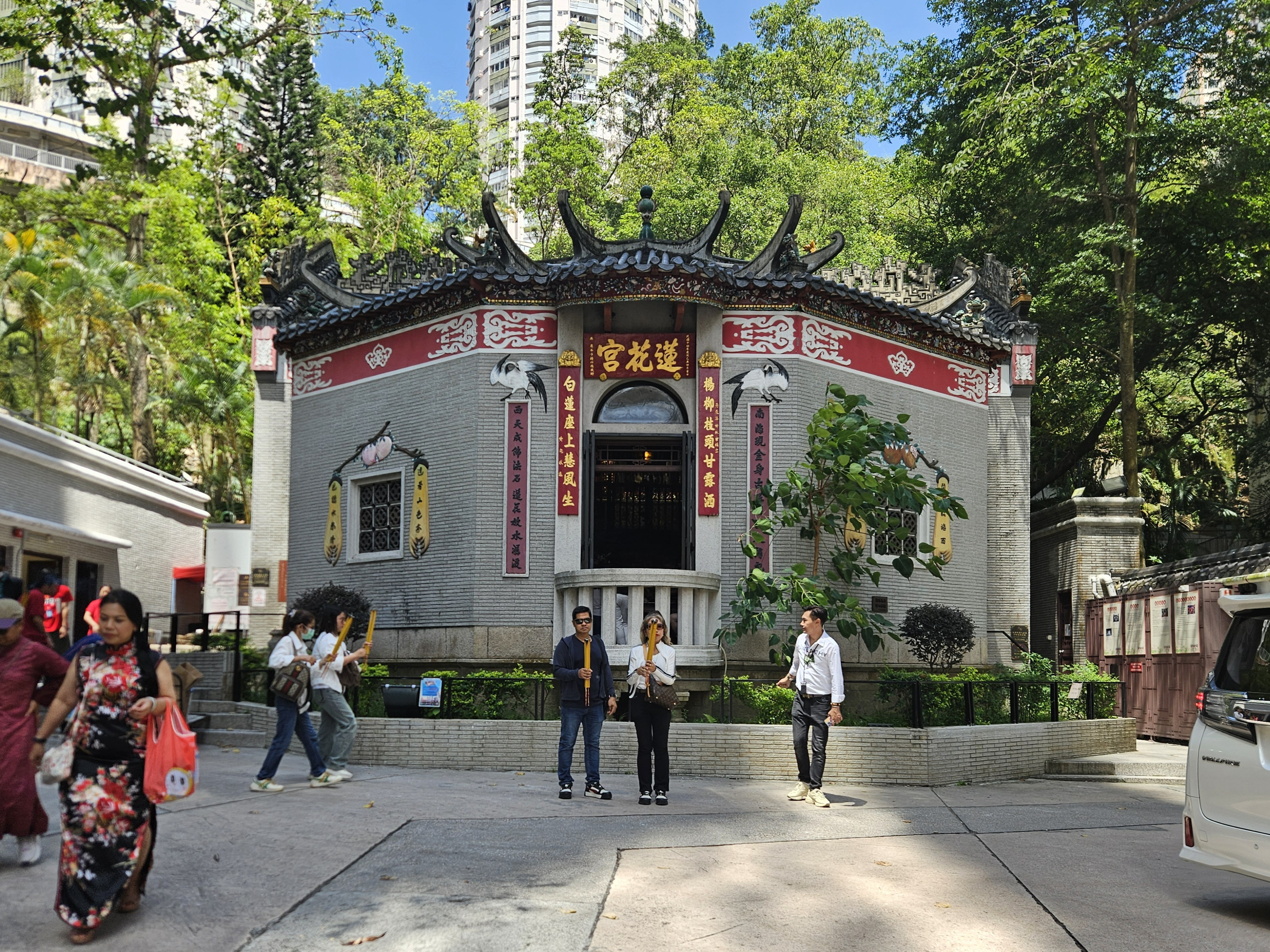
- Front view

Religion
- Affiliation: Buddhism

Location
- Location: Tai Hang, Causeway Bay, Wan Chai District, Hong Kong
- Interactive map of Lin Fa Temple

Architecture
- Completed: 1863; 163 years ago
- Designated as NHL

Hong Kong Graded Building – Grade I
- Designated: 17 May 2010; 16 years ago

Lin Fa Temple
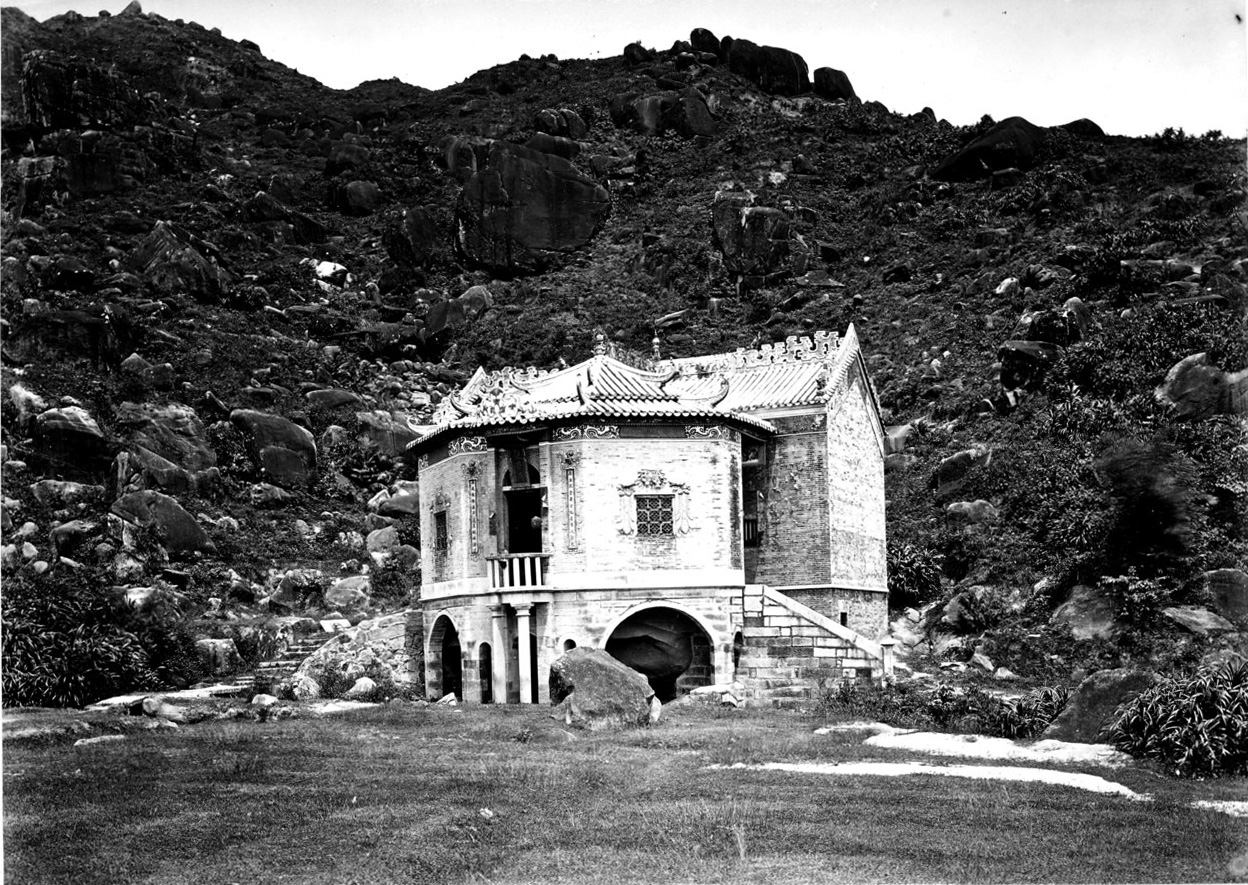
- Lin Fa Temple in the 1870s
- Traditional Chinese: 蓮花宮
- Literal meaning: Lotus Temple
Transcriptions
Yue: Cantonese
- Yale Romanization: Lìhn fā gūng
- Jyutping: Lin^{4} faa^{1} gung^{1}

Lin Fa Temple or Lin Fa Kung is a temple located at the end of Lin Fa Kung Street, which is named after the temple, in the Tai Hang area in the southeastern part of Causeway Bay, Hong Kong Island. It was originally built in 1863, during the Qing dynasty, and was reconstructed in 1986 and 1999. The original use of the temple was a worship place for Guanyin (also known as "Kwun Yam" in Cantonese), the goddess of mercy.

Nowadays, it is a tourist attraction as well as a place for local people to celebrate traditional festivals including the Mid-autumn Festival, when the traditional Tai Hang Fire Dragon Dance is held. Previously listed as a Grade I historic building, the Lin Fa Temple has been declared a monument.

== History ==
Lin Fa Temple was originally built in 1863, during the Qing dynasty. It is said that Kwun Yam, the goddess of mercy, once appeared on the Lotus Rock to help people avert disasters and bring them good luck. Since then, the local people built a temple which looks like a lotus flower on the Lotus Rock to house Kwun Yam, hoping that she could bring them peace and serenity.

Every year on the 19th day of February, June, September and November in lunar calendar, worshippers will go to Lin Fa Temple to pay tribute to Kwun Yam and celebrate the important days such as her birthday, the day when she became a nun and the Goddess of Mercy. On Mid-Autumn festival, the traditional Tai Hang Fire Dragon Dance is held. Other events are celebrated on different special festivals.

Apart from Kwun Yam, the temple also houses other deities including Tai Sui – Sixty Gods of Time (太歲), Skanda (Chinese: 韋馱; Cantonese pronunciation: Wai Tor) and the god of wealth (Chinese: 財神; Cantonese pronunciation: Choi Sun).

The Chinese Temples Committee has taken over the temple since 1975. The temple was renovated by the committee in 1986.

== Architecture and features ==
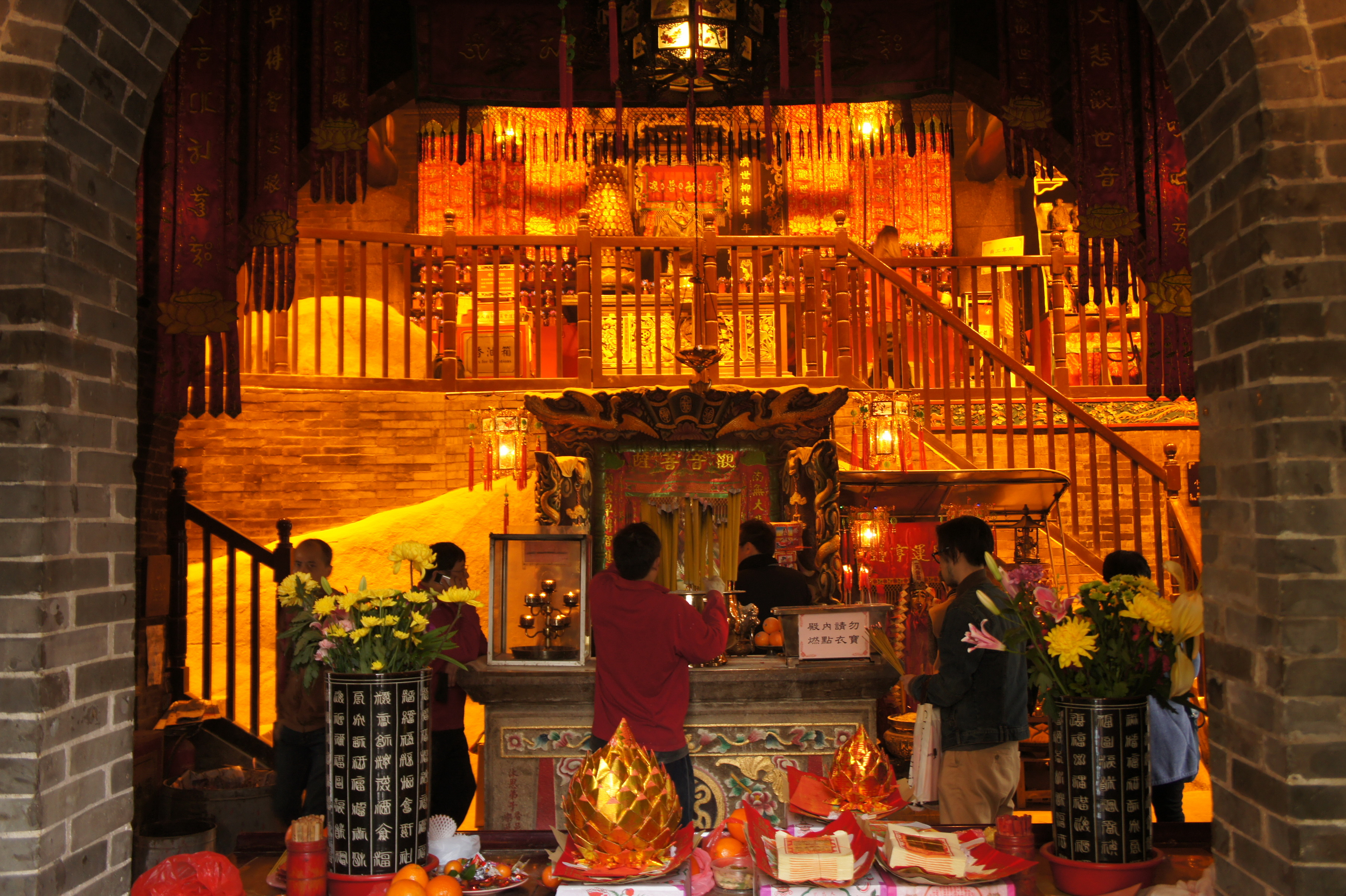
Interior of the temple

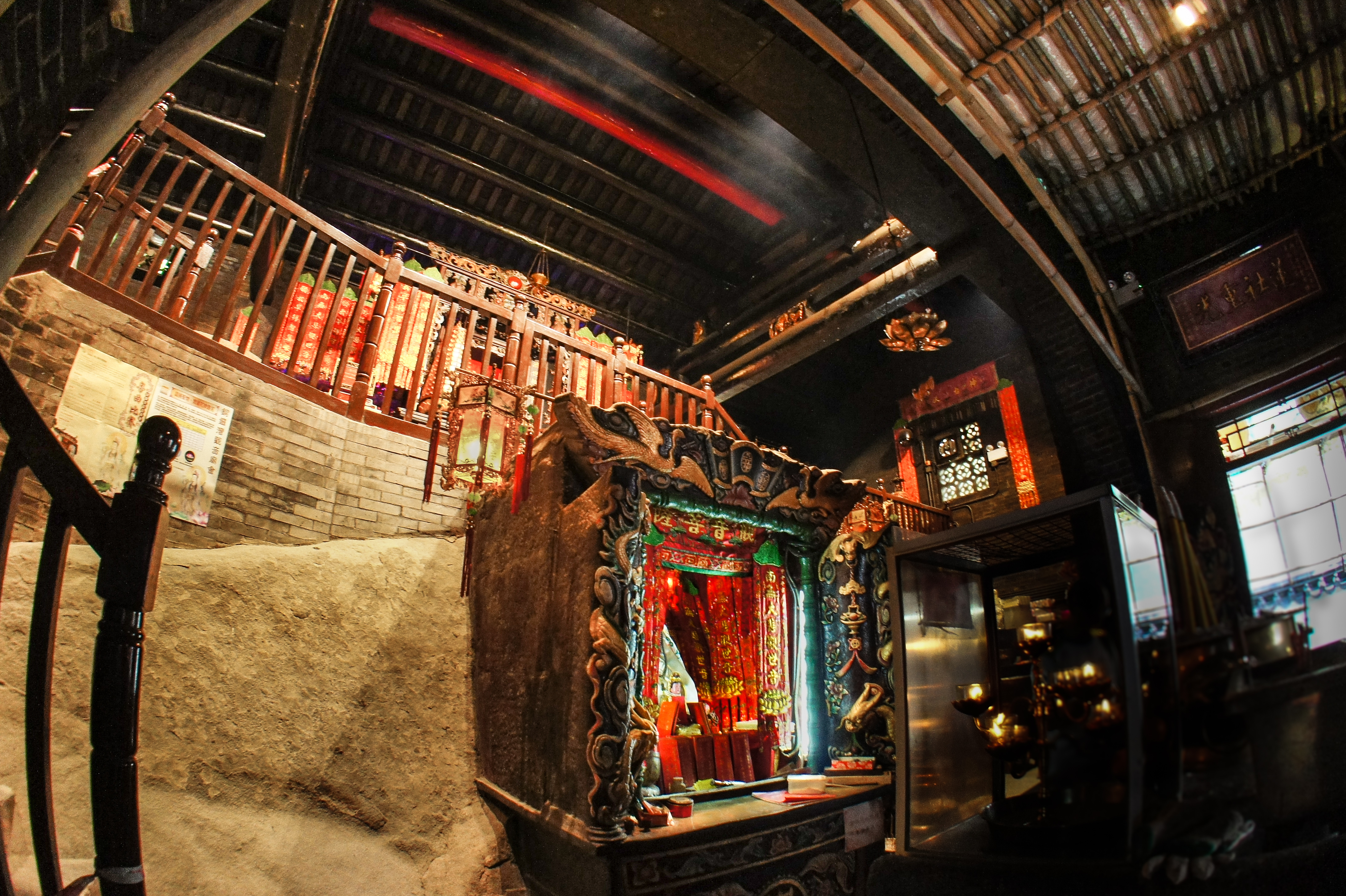
Interior of the temple

Although it is not big in size, Lin Fa Temple is specially structured. The front section of the terrace is supported by 10–12 feet high pillars, while the back section is situated on a boulder, which is also called the Lotus Rock. Nowadays, part of the boulder is hidden by the exterior wall, and the rest of it is exposed and still can be seen.

=== Roof ===
The roof of the temple is another special feature. On the roof and the upper part of the internal wall, there are murals of flying dragons, phoenixes and arrangement of lotus flowers. The murals of flying dragons are said to be set up because of the annual performance of fire dragon dance, an important event which takes place in Tai Hang district during the Mid-autumn festival.

=== Lotus flower lamps ===
Lotus flower lamps can be seen everywhere in the temple. There is also a chamber which collects hundreds of lotus flower lamps. The lotus flower lamps are expected to bless the safety and prosperity of the worshippers and their families.

=== Windows ===
The design of windows in Lin Fa Temple is unique. There are three windows, all of which are made of wood and delicately carved. Around every window there are one or two pairs of Dui Lian (對聯), a traditional form of Chinese literature. The contents of Dui Lian hanging on the walls are mostly the expressions of praising nature and worshipping Kwun Yam.

== Legend ==
=== Deities ===
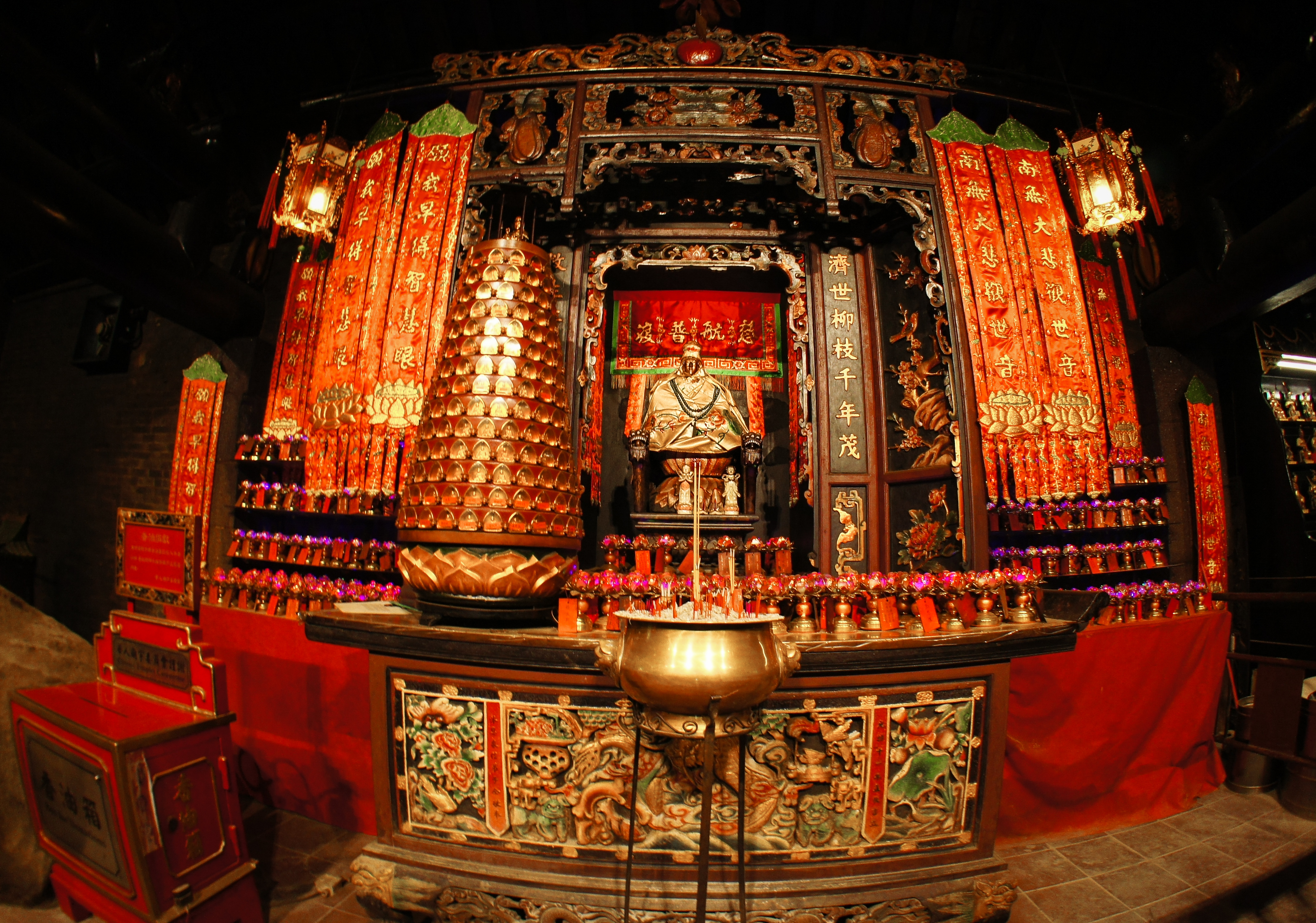
Statue of the Goddess of Mercy in Lin Fa Temple

The main deity enshrined in the temple is Kwum Yam (also referred to as Guan Yin), the Goddess of Mercy. Besides, other deities can also be found in the temple. Worshippers pay accolade to deities including Wai Tor, Yum Choi Sun and Tai Sui as well. These deities are respectively known as Buddhist Temple Guardian, the Wealth God (of the nether side) and the Sixty Gods of Time among Chinese.

=== Kwun Yum and Lin Fa Kung ===
The divinity Kwum Yam has a long history in Chinese culture. The legend has different forms but she is commonly recognized as the goddess of mercy, kindness and clemency. It had been said that Kwun Yam was a male god at first but eventually evolved to be a female holy being. There are also myths saying that Kwun Yam was originally a princess and turned out to be a goddess. However, deliverance of the heaps and spiritual salvation are the typical perceptions that Kwun Yam delivers. Obviously, the foundation of Lin Fa Temple (the Lotus Temple) in Hong Kong is based on the legend of Kwun Yam. Stories and myths have been spreading around, saying that Kwun Yam was once seen presenting herself on the Lotus Rock. Therefore, worshippers and parishioners then built up a temple to praise Kwum Yam near the rock, and this gave rise to the construction of the temple.

== Traditions ==
The long history of Lin Fa Temple is accompanied by a variety of traditions, such as the Kwun Yam Festival, Kwun Yum Open Treasury and Tai Hang Dragon Dance.

=== Kwun Yam Festival ===
Lin Fa Temple provides a place for the followers of Kwun Yam to celebrate the four Kwun Yam festivals, including Kwun Yam's birthday, the day when she was ordained, the day of her deification and the day when she became the sea-goddess on the 19th day of the second, sixth, ninth and eleventh lunar month respectively.

=== Kwun Yum Open Treasury ===
Worshippers of Kwun Yam will go to Lin Fa Temple on the 26th day of the lunar calendar to "borrow" prosperity from Kwun Yam as a kind of blessing.

=== Tai Hang Dragon Dance ===
(Chinese: 大坑舞火龍)
During Mid-autumn Festival, the Dragon Dance team will first go to Lin Fa Temple before going to the Wanchai Southorn Playground for the Dragon Dance performance which bears a symbolic purpose to protect the followers from misfortune.
