= Dumplings (film) =

2004 Hong Kong film by Fruit Chan

Dumplings (Gaau ji)
- Film poster
- Directed by: Fruit Chan
- Written by: Lilian Lee
- Produced by: Peter Chan; Eric Tsang
- Starring: Miriam Yeung; Tony Leung Ka-fai; Bai Ling; Pauline Lau; Mi Mi Lee; Miki Yeung
- Cinematography: Christopher Doyle
- Edited by: Fruit Chan (Note: Credited as Sam-Fat Tin.); Chan Ki-hop
- Music by: Chan Kwong-wing
- Production company: Applause Pictures
- Release dates: 4 August 2004 (Germany); 11 October 2005 (Cardiff Film Festival)
- Running time: 91 minutes
- Country: Hong Kong
- Languages: Cantonese; Mandarin

Dumplings (Chinese: 餃子; pinyin: Jiǎozi; Jyutping: Gaau2zi2) is a 2004 Hong Kong horror film, directed by Fruit Chan. It was expanded from a short segment in the horror compilation, Three... Extremes. The film is rated as Category III in Hong Kong. It premiered in Germany during the Berlin International Film Festival, on 4 August 2004, as part of the Panorama section.

== Plot ==
Mrs. Li, a former actress, is losing her good looks and longs for passion with her wealthy husband, who is having an affair with his much younger masseuse. Mrs. Li seeks the help of Aunt Mei, a local chef. Mei cooks her some special dumplings which she claims to be effective for rejuvenation. She tells Mrs. Li that the secret ingredient for her rejuvenating dumplings is unborn fetuses imported from an abortion clinic in Shenzhen, where she used to work. Mrs. Li is frustrated by the lack of progress and asks Mei to keep finding more potent remedies.

Mei agrees to perform a risky black market abortion on Kate, a girl five months pregnant who has been impregnated by her father, in order to provide the fetus for Mrs. Li. Mei prepares dumplings; after Mrs. Li sneaks a look in the kitchen and sees the fetus, she is disgusted and runs away, but shortly returns and consumes them. She receives a call that her husband has broken his leg and returns home. When she arrives to care for him, he finds her more attractive than before, and they have passionate sex. Kate and her mother are seen riding a bus home after the abortion, with Kate bleeding heavily onto her seat. After getting off, Kate collapses on the pavement and dies in her mother's arms.

Mrs. Li hosts a dinner party for her friends, who compliment her and marvel over her newfound beauty. However, they claim there is a horrid fish-like smell in the air, which turns out to be from Mrs. Li herself. She excuses herself from the table and flees to the bathroom. Furious with Mei, Mrs. Li calls her, demanding to know what she has ingested. Mei claims that a child conceived by way of incest is the most potent and assures Mrs. Li that the results will be worth the embarrassment from the smell, while Mrs. Li cries in the bathtub while watching a rerun of her old series. Mr. Li arrives home and eavesdrops on their conversation.

Mr. Li visits Mei and passes a girl who resembles Kate. They discuss instances of cannibalism in Chinese history while Mei makes him dumplings. He eats them and they have violent sex, during which she reveals she is actually 64 years old. They are interrupted by a call from Mrs. Li, but Mei hangs up on her. Mr. Li leaves, and Mrs. Li arrives to plead with Mei for more dumplings, but Mei continues to ignore her. When Mrs. Li tracks Mei down at a hair salon and leaves her a check, Mei rips it apart.

Police arrive at Kate's apartment and find her father stabbed to death by her mother. Mei flees her apartment, and Mrs. Li sees the apartment being raided by police. Mrs. Li meets with Mr. Li's masseuse, who states she is five months pregnant, and Mrs. Li pays her to immediately abort the fetus. Mrs. Li instructs the doctor to use a method without drugs to perform the abortion. Mei is pictured carrying her belongings through the streets while Mrs. Li makes dumplings from the fetus.

== Differences from the version in Three... Extremes ==
Whereas the extended version retains much of the plot from the short film in Three... Extremes, the endings differ. The short film focuses solely on Mrs Li's quest for rejuvenated youth and does not include the masseuse or the subplot involving Mr Li and Mei's affair. Consequently, in place of the masseuse's pregnancy, Mrs Li finds that she herself is two-months pregnant with a child she was told she would never have. After learning she can no longer get dumplings from Mei, she decides to abort her own child and make it into dumplings for her to eat. The final scene is of Mrs Li, close-up to the camera and slowly eating a dumpling, most probably with meat of her own fetus.

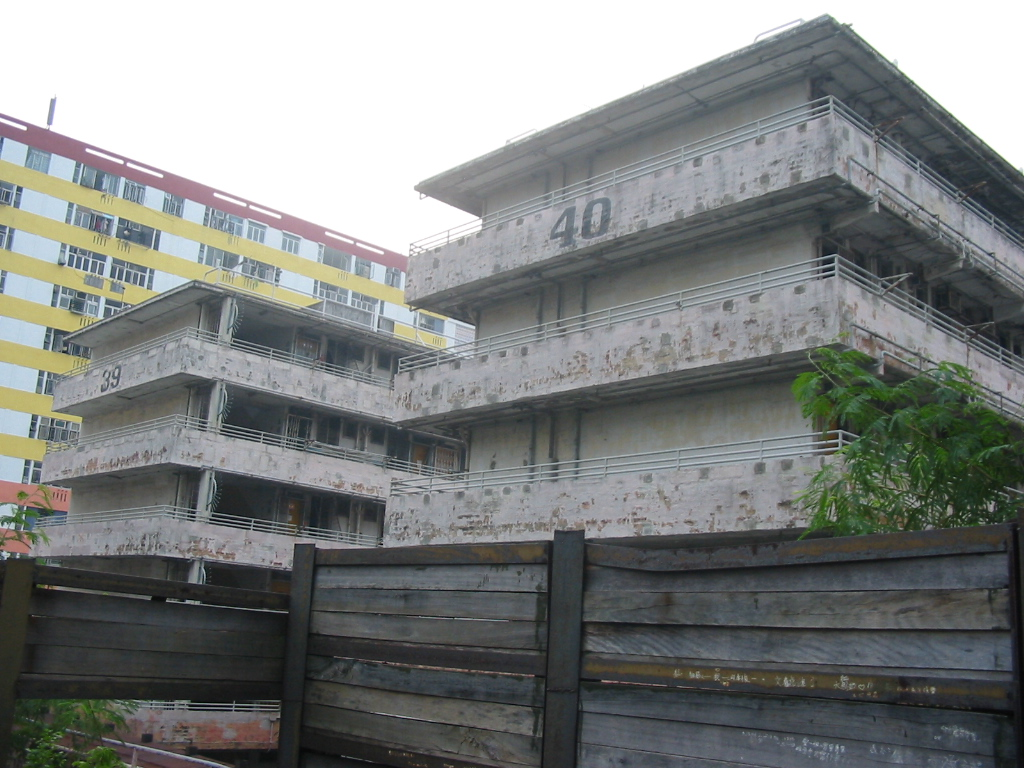
Mei's Hong Kong apartment is located within Shek Kip Mei Estate. Block 40, demolished in 2007, is featured in the film.

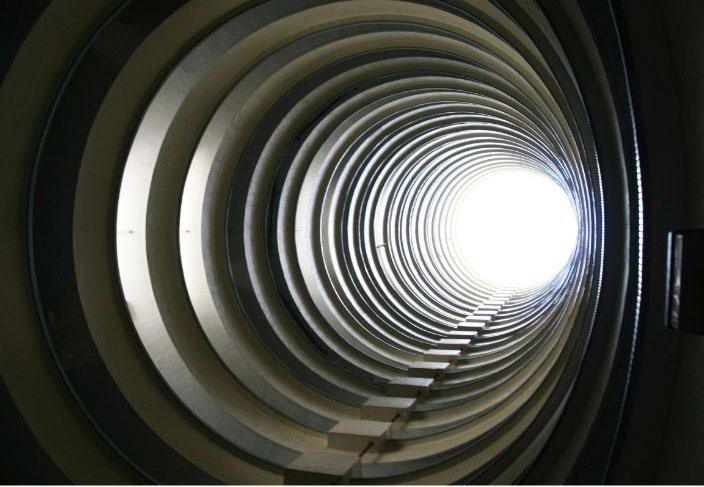
Kate lives with her parents in Lai Tak Tsuen. The building void appears in the film.

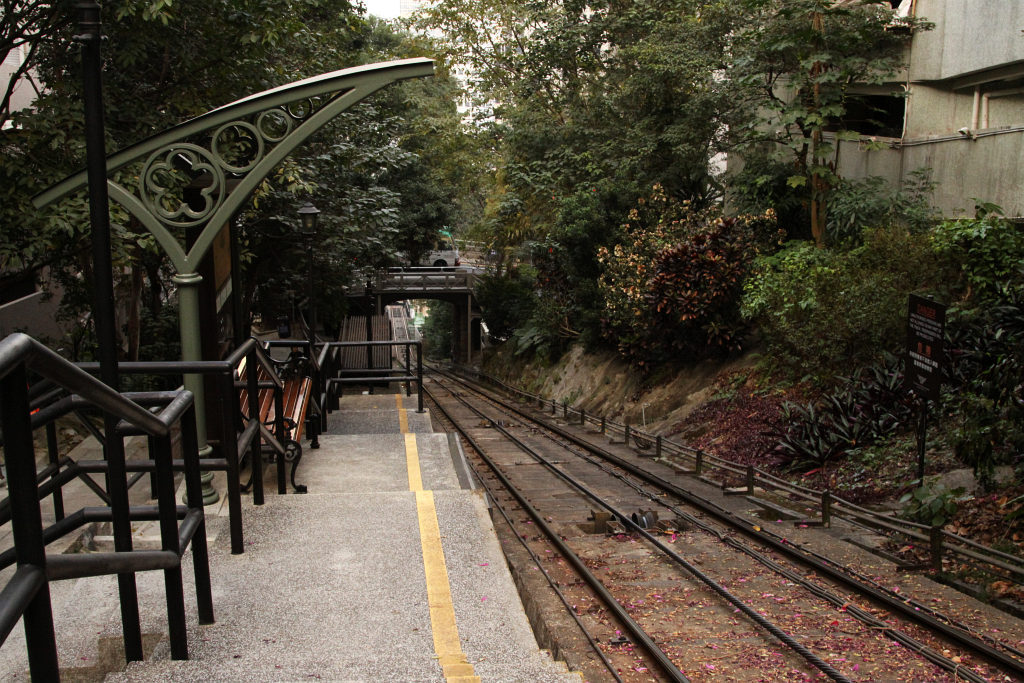
MacDonnell Road station of the Peak Tram appears in a scene of the film, when Mrs. Li and Mei walk up the hill towards Mrs. Li's house.

== Cast ==
- Miriam Yeung as Mrs Li
- Tony Leung Ka-fai as Mr Li
- Bai Ling as Aunt Mei
- Pauline Lau as Masseuse
- Miki Yeung as Kate
- Wong So-foon as Kate's mother

== Production ==
Filming locations include Shek Kip Mei Estate, before redevelopment, and Lai Tak Tsuen.

== Reception and interpretation ==
Dumplings received mixed reviews. Keith Hennessey Brown of Eye For Films gave the film 4.5 out of 5 stars, calling it "a beautifully crafted, thoughtful and thought-provoking piece of cinema that once again confirms Fruit Chan's status as Hong Kong's best filmmaker". Mark Kermode of The Guardian praised Miriam Yeung's performance and "Lilian Lee's blacker-than-black screenplay", but criticized that its "socio-political nuances are lost ... amid sploshy scenes of catheters and cookery which flag up the film's grindhouse origins". AmselLuu of Asian Movie Pulse called the film "well-shot" and "well-acted with the impressive performance of Bai Ling as Aunt Mei", but was less impressed with Miriam Yeung's performance.

The film has been called "one of the most realistic works of 'fiction'", since it deals with a practice that has been repeatedly reported from China's and Hong Kong's recent past. Indeed Fruit Chan and Lilian Lee believe that they were served fetus soup while researching for the film in a hospital and that Chan repeatedly consumed such soup while recovering after an accident, finding out only afterwards that "he had eaten soup made from a miscarried five-month fetus".

The film has been interpreted as a criticism of China's one-child policy, which caused many parents to have abortions even against their will. It raises the question of who is more to blame: the government whose policy makes sure that the fetuses cannot be born, or those who then exploit their bodies for their own purposes?

== Awards ==
Bai Ling won the award of Best Supporting Actress at the 24th Hong Kong Film Awards in 2005.

== See also ==
- Child cannibalism
