= Serenade (Hong Kong) =

Housing area

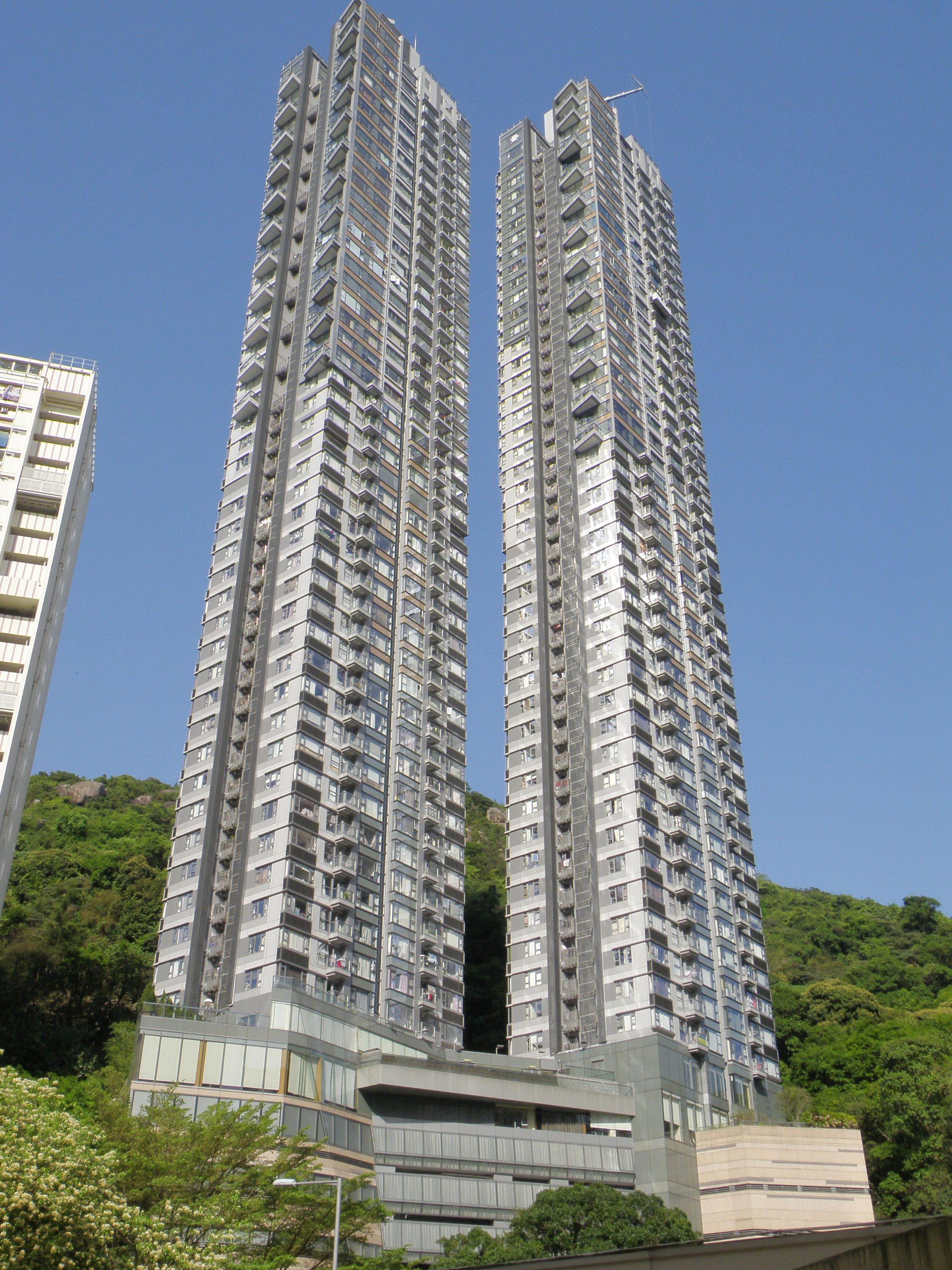
Serenade.

Serenade is a private housing estate in Tai Hang, Causeway Bay, Wan Chai District, Hong Kong Island, Hong Kong. It has two residential towers each 53 storeys tall and a clubhouse with an outdoor swimming pool. Construction completed in January 2010 with 275 flats. Before Serenade began construction, the site was occupied by Lai Sing Court.

== Politics ==
Serenade is located in Tin Hau constituency of the Wan Chai District Council. It was formerly represented by Chan Yuk-lam, who was elected in the 2019 elections until July 2021.
