= Tai Hang Nullah =

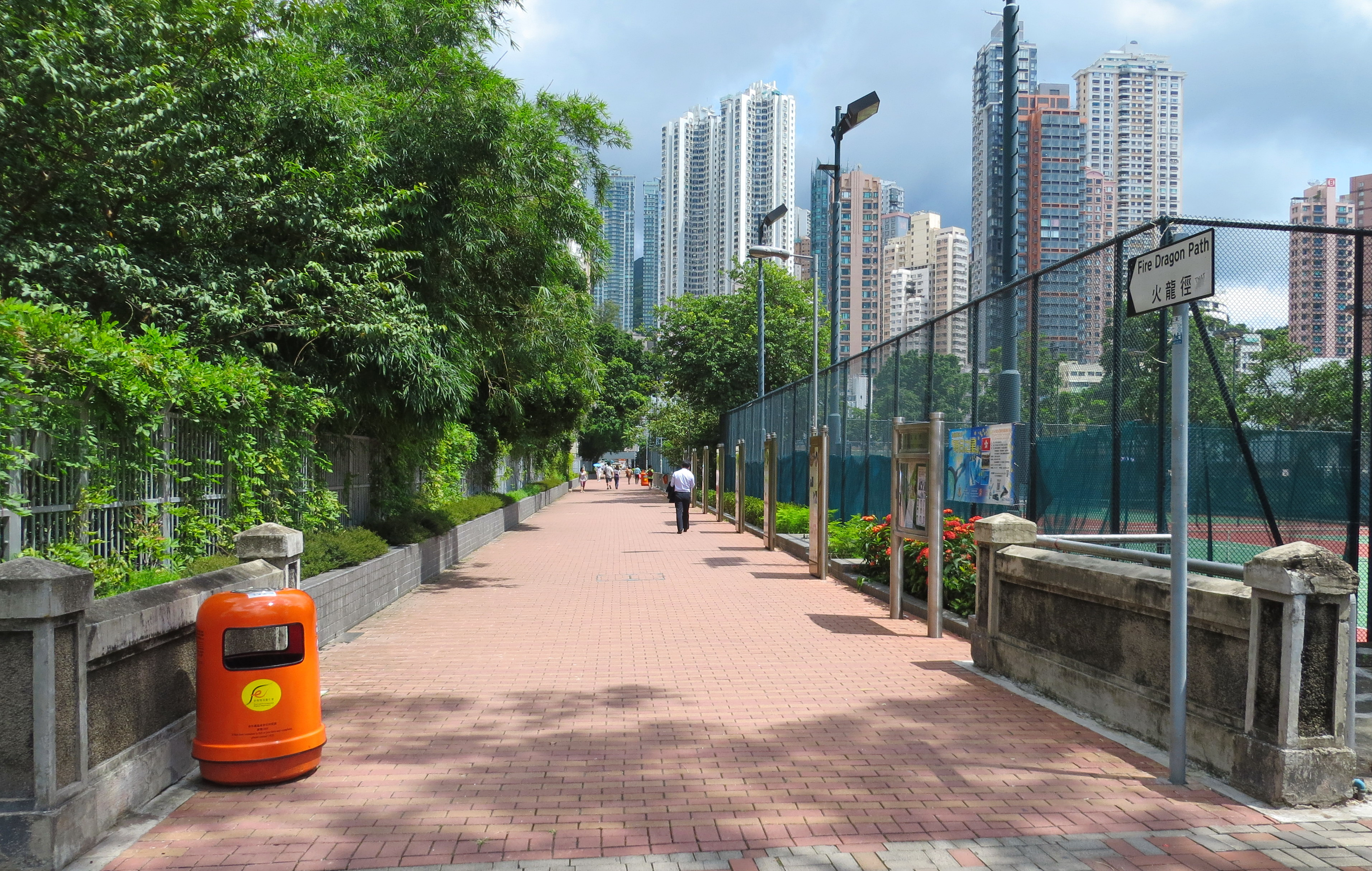
Fire Dragon Trail

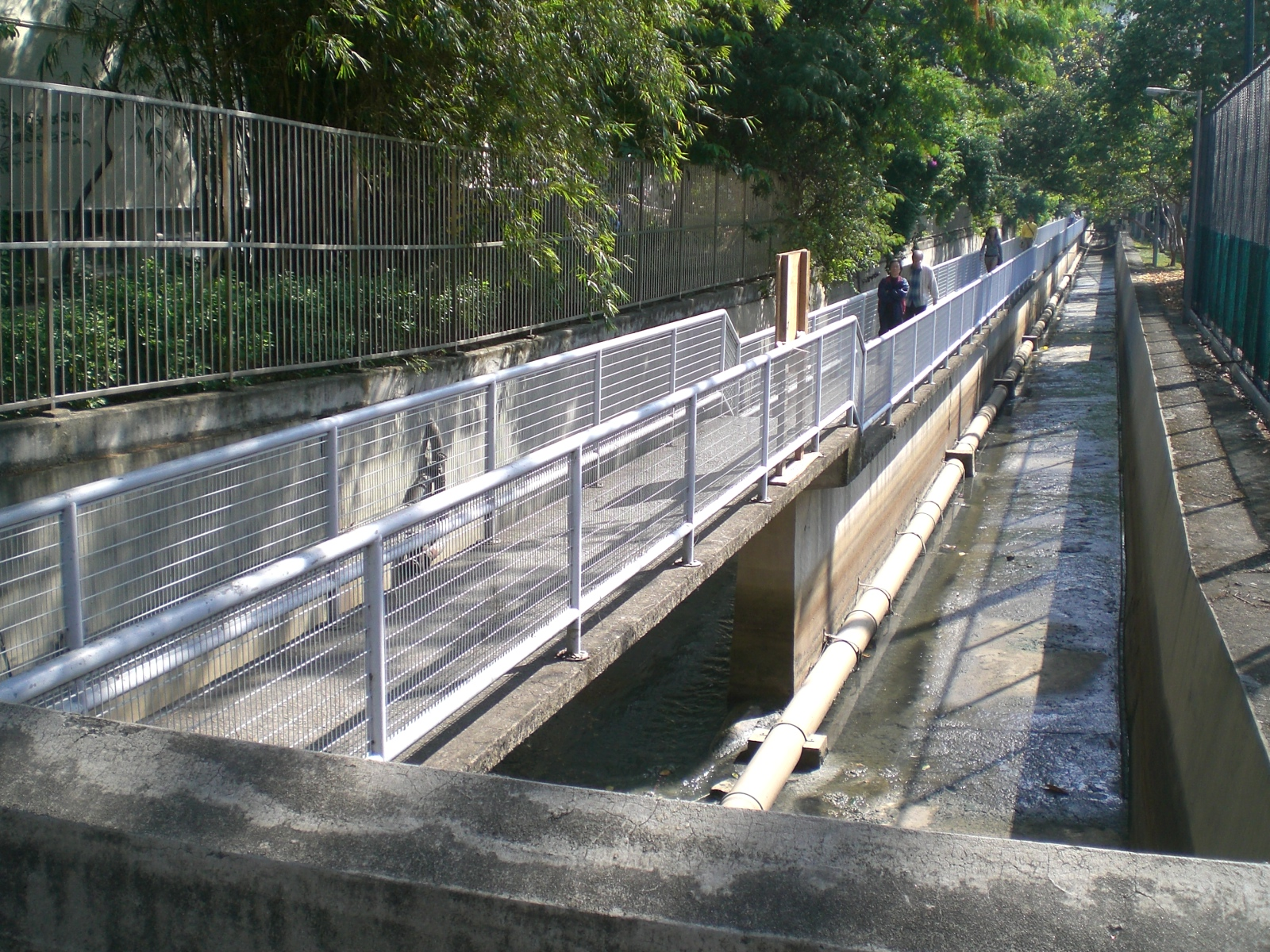
The northern entrance of Causeway Road before the covering of the Tai Hang Nullah; the pedestrian bridge in the picture is commonly known as the "Bridge over the River Kwai". (Photo taken in December 2007)

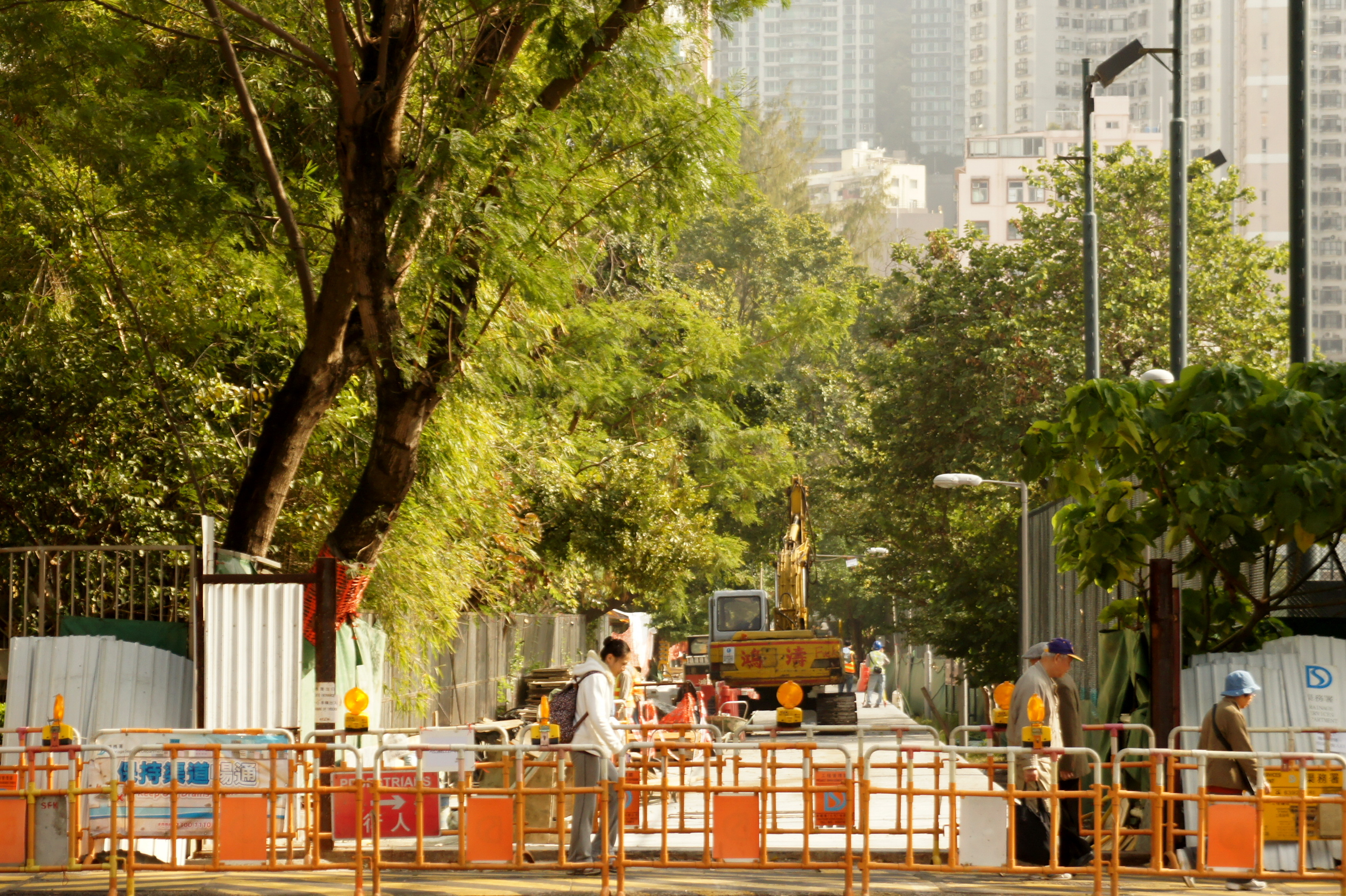
The northern entrance of Causeway Road where the Tai Hang Nullah covering works were in progress. (Photo taken in January 2012)

Tai Hang Nullah (Chinese: 大坑明渠 or 大坑渠) is one of the main nullahs in Hong Kong, located in Tai Hang in the south of Causeway Bay on Hong Kong Island. It originates from streams in the area of Mount Butler (畢拿山) and Jardine's Lookout (渣甸山) and flows northward into the bay of Causeway Bay. This waterway is the origin of the place name Tai Hang (大坑, lit. Big Nullah or Big Pit). However, due to urban development and land reclamation projects, most of the waterway was converted into culverts in the 1960s, leaving only a 200-metre-long section from Tung Lo Wan Road (銅鑼灣道) to Causeway Road (高士威道) that is adjacent to the Causeway Bay Sports Ground and Queen's College. There is a very narrow pedestrian bridge above the channel, commonly known as the "Bridge over the River Kwai".

The upstream of Tai Hang Nullah was covered and became Wun Sha Street (浣紗街) as early as the 1960s.

== Engineering Works ==
The original open nullah was located near Queen's College in Tai Hang. To improve the surrounding environment, the Drainage Services Department carried out the "Improvement Works of Nullah at Tai Hang" project in November 2009. The project cost HK$24 million and the scope of the project included covering a 250-metre-long Tai Hang Nullah, widening the old footpath, and carrying out greening works along the expanded footpath. The project was completed in August 2013. The project solved the odour problem caused by the Tai Hang Nullah and created a new landmark for Tai Hang - the Fire Dragon Trail, adding a unique leisure space to Tai Hang. The Tai Hang Fire Dragon Dance performed during the Mid-Autumn Festival is a local tradition of Tai Hang. This activity was listed as a national intangible cultural heritage of China in 2011, and was included in the Representative List of the Intangible Cultural Heritage of Hong Kong in 2017. In 2019, it was included in the Excellent Protection Practice Case of National Intangible Cultural Heritage Representative Projects by the Ministry of Culture and Tourism of China. To mark this cultural event, the new pedestrian walkway was named Fire Dragon Trail (火龍徑).
