= Pok Fu Lam Village Fire Dragon Dance =

Festival in Hong Kong

The Fire Dragon Dance in Pok Fu Lam Village is the main activity during the Mid-Autumn Festival. People hope to beg for peace and be blessed by the gods. It is an important part of the cultural heritage of Hong Kong.

== Background ==
The Fire Dragon Dance in Pok Fu Lam is similar to Tai Hang's. The origin of Fire Dragon Dance can be traced to over a hundred years ago in Tai Hang. After suffering from a storm, the people of Pok Fu Lam village were attacked by a snake that destroyed the village's peace. The villagers then caught the snake and killed it. In the days following the snake's death, plague broke out in Tai Hang. At that time, an elderly villager received Buddha's guidance in a dream that told him to hold The Fire Dragon Dance in the Mid-Autumn festival to drive away the plague. This succeeded, and people began to believe that The Fire Dragon Dance could drive away bad luck and plague. So the tradition of The Fire Dragon Dance has been upheld until now and the location spread from Tai Hang to Po Fu Lam. The Fire Dragon Dance is a traditional custom of the Hakka ethnic group from China.

== The Fire Dragon ==
Pok Fu Lam fire dragons are incense-lit, straw-filled dragons. The Fire Dragon are over ten meters long and made of bamboo sticks, metal wire and straw (pearl grass) imported from China,. The dragon is supported by bamboo poles which become handles for the dancers. Villagers adhere burning incense sticks to the skeletons and the burning incense sticks constitute the body of the Fire Dragon. Several large balls or pomelos pierced with wooden sticks are used for dragonballs. In tradition's centennial anniversary in year 2010, leader of Pok Fu Lam village fire dragon dance team, Mr. Ng Kwong-nam, made an attempt for Guinness World Records. He made a dragon which was officially measured to be over 73 meters long. It used 40 000 incense sticks and had 36 segments, two people for each segment.

== Activities ==
The fire dragon dance starts at 6:30 p.m. on the mid-autumn Festival. At the entrance of Pokfulam village, there will be an altar, and incense will be burned at the altar to worship the fire dragon. Then, the villager will paint the eyes of the dragon, which is called "waak lung dim zing" in Chinese. At 7 o'clock p.m., the fire dragon dance starts. The fire dragon will first dance around the Pokfulam road. It will then go to the Lin Ning Spirit and Xi Guo Da Wang Temple to pray, and enter the village after the pray. In fact, the fire dragon will pass through main streets: Wai Tsai, Lung Zi Duk and Coi jyun to visit each family in the village and bless the villagers. Afterwards, the fire dragon will return to the entrance of the village and other people can incense at the fire dragon and pray for bless there. The fire dragon will then be moved to the Waterfall Bay beach through Pokfulam road, Wah Fu Road and Waterfall Bay Road. spinning on the bus stop at the Pokfulam road twice and swaying at the Wah Fu Road in front of the Wah Lok House twice again. Finally, when it is arrived to the Waterfall Bay beach, the villagers will wear life jackets and bring back the dragon to the sea, which means "cong lung kwai hoi" in Chinese. The whole event will end at 11:30 p.m.

== Location ==
=== Layout and History of Pok Fu Lam Village ===
Pok Fu Lam village is located on Hong Kong Island on Pok Fu Lam Road. The village is characterized by its narrow lanes and twisting alleys that form a complex network of paths through a collection of traditional one-storey buildings that feature walls of hay and stone and pitched roof tiles, some of which have been there since 1886, the establishment date for the original dairy farm company. The village houses around two thousand villagers today. The village is also home to some religious structures such as the Li Ling Pagoda and the Bogong Shrine.

== Values ==
The tradition of fire dragon dance began in Pokfulam village about 200 years ago, it witnessed the changes of both the village and Hong Kong, thus the historical culture of the dance to villagers and Hong Kong people is significant and momentous.

=== To the villagers ===
Pokfulam's fire dragon dance is not as popular as Tai Hang's, but the whole community participates in the process of constructing the dragon. Despite the secret construction methods, other villagers can take part in the event: they help carry buckets, move heavy stones, and prepare turnip puddings. In fact, it aims to build a sense of community through the division of work, and strengthen the bonding among villagers. Moreover, the fire dragon dance is literally meant as a blessing to the village as it will pass through each house and lane, symbolizing the dismissal of pestilence and wishes for the health of all villagers.

=== To Hong Kong ===
Pokfulam's fire dragon dance is a historical architecture, the villagers promote their community as part of industrial and agricultural heritage of Hong Kong. The villagers also willing to introduce visitors the ancient design, structure and reconstructions of the houses as education. The outsiders, men or women, could even be involved in part of the ‘dancing’ process, for instance, putting the incense sticks into the dragon, holding it and rushing down to the sea with other villagers. This is unlike the Tai Hang's. It is an important folk custom that expresses fraternity and social harmony. The World Monument Fund claimed it as the modern appearance of the village belies its importance to the history of Hong Kong, contributing to the preservation of the diversity of this urban space.
