= Pok Fu Lam =

Residential area on Hong Kong Island

Coordinates: 22°15′36″N 114°08′16″E

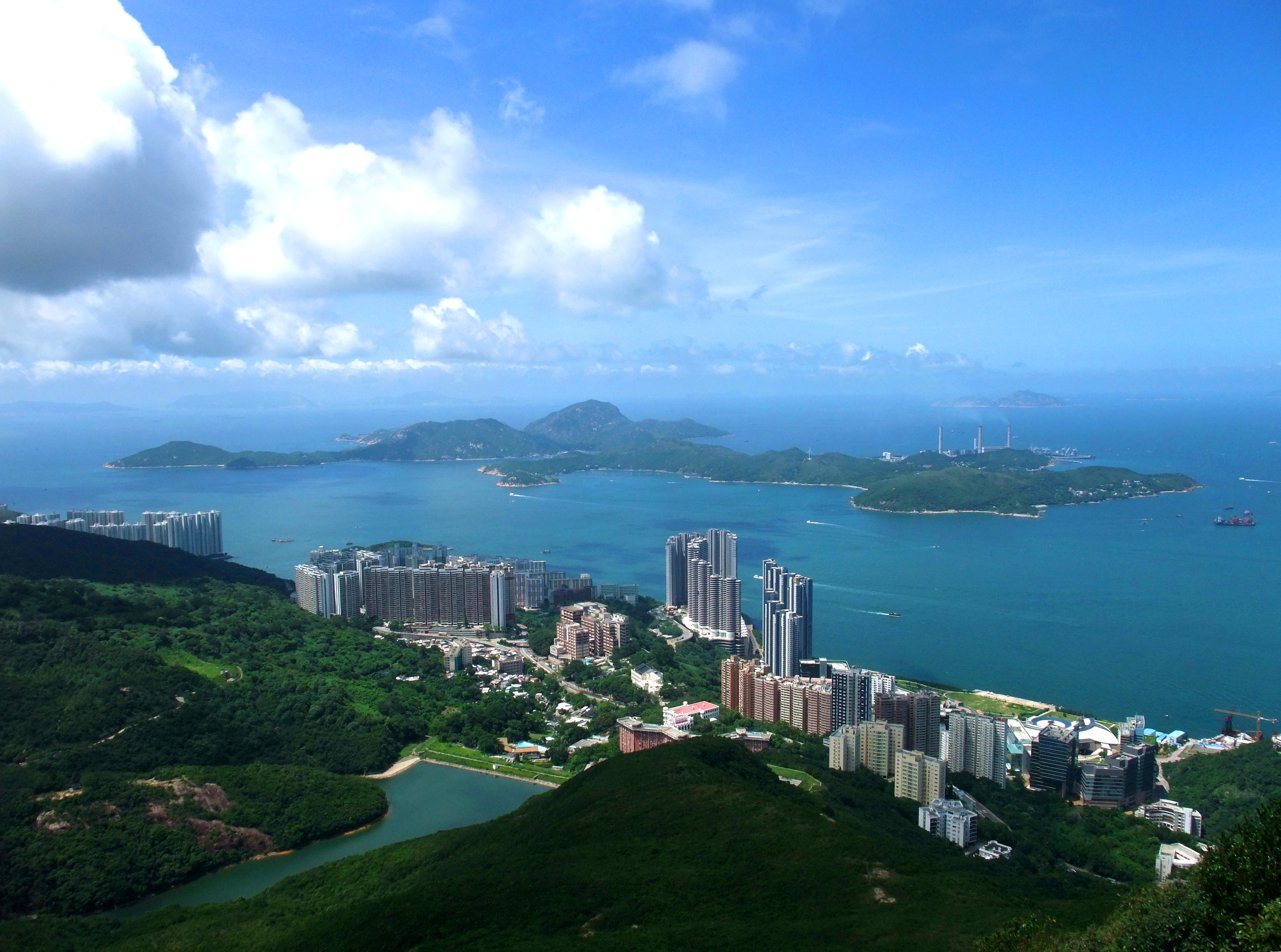
- Overlooking Pok Fu Lam and Lamma Island from High West
- Chinese: 薄扶林
- Cantonese Yale: Bohkfùhlàhm
- Literal meaning: Thin Shielding Forest
Transcriptions
Standard Mandarin
- Hanyu Pinyin: Bófúlín
Yue: Cantonese
- Yale Romanization: Bohkfùhlàhm
- Jyutping: Bok6fu4lam4
- IPA: [pɔ̀ːk̚.fȕː.lɐ̏m]

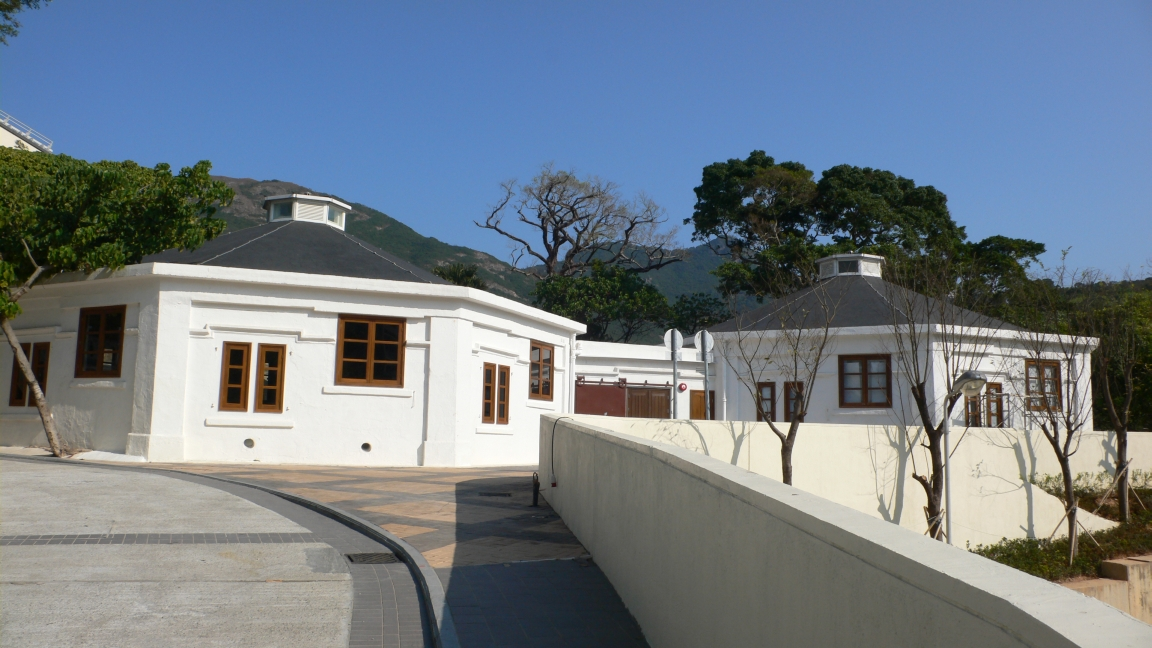
Old cowsheds of the dairy farm

Pok Fu Lam (薄扶林) or Pokfulam is a residential area on Hong Kong Island, at the western end of the Southern District. It is a valley between Victoria Peak and Mount Kellett, around Telegraph Bay.

Pok Fu Lam can claim several firsts in the history of Hong Kong: It was the place where Hong Kong's floral emblem, Bauhinia blakeana, was first discovered; the site for Hong Kong's first reservoir, Pok Fu Lam Reservoir (1883, now part of a country park), and the site for Hong Kong's first dairy farm by five investors, including Sir Patrick Manson in 1885. The farm supplied not only milk, but cattle to Hong Kong, and later became Dairy Farm. However, it no longer exists in Pok Fu Lam.

Pok Fu Lam is connected to Lung Fu Shan, Sai Ying Pun and Aberdeen by the Pok Fu Lam Road. It's also indirectly connected to the Mid-Levels. Pok Fu Lam also overlooks Lamma Island. Pok Fu Lam is connected to Kennedy Town via Smithfield and Shek Tong Tsui via Hill Road.

== Sights ==
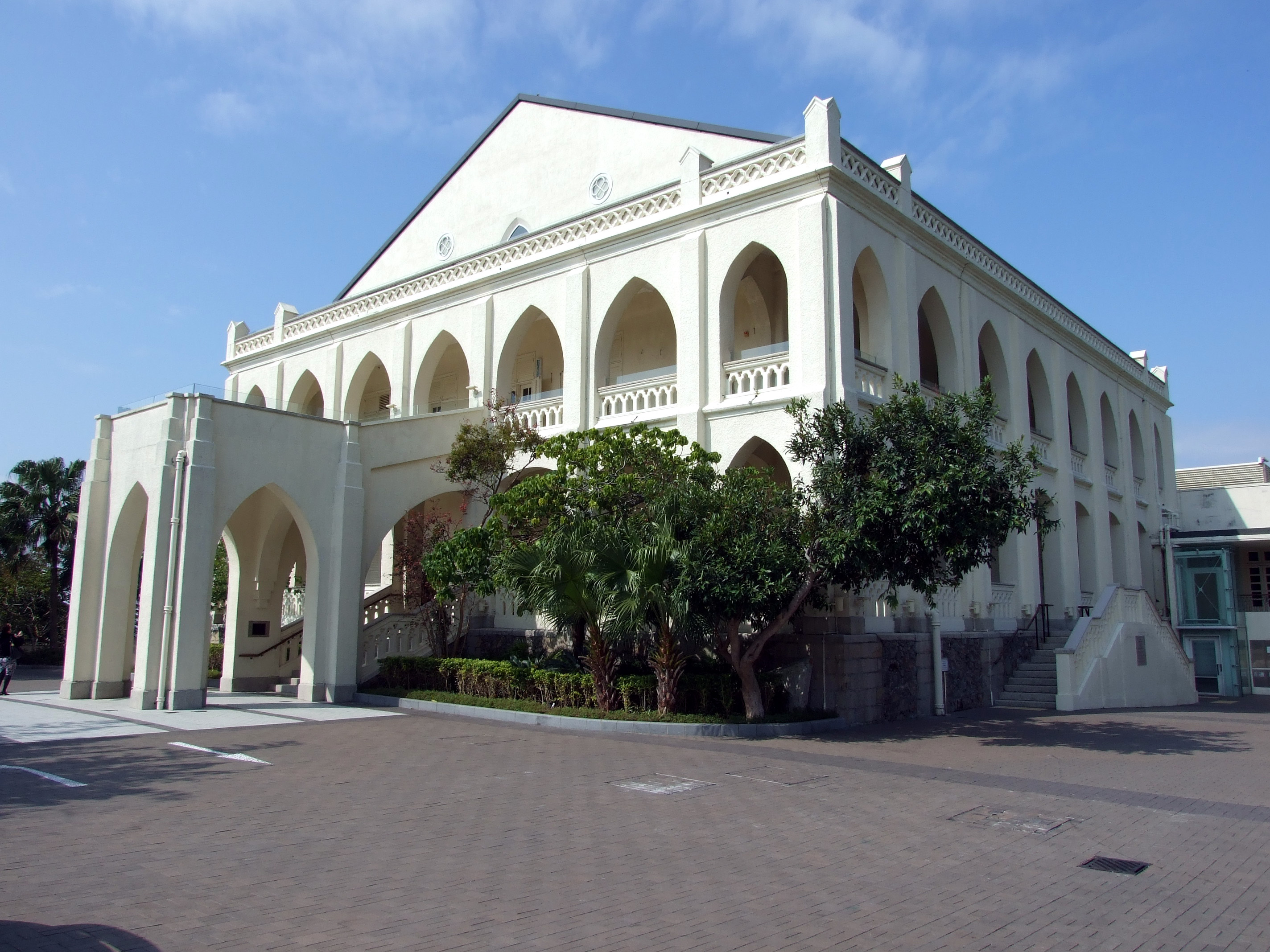
Béthanie in Pok Fu Lam

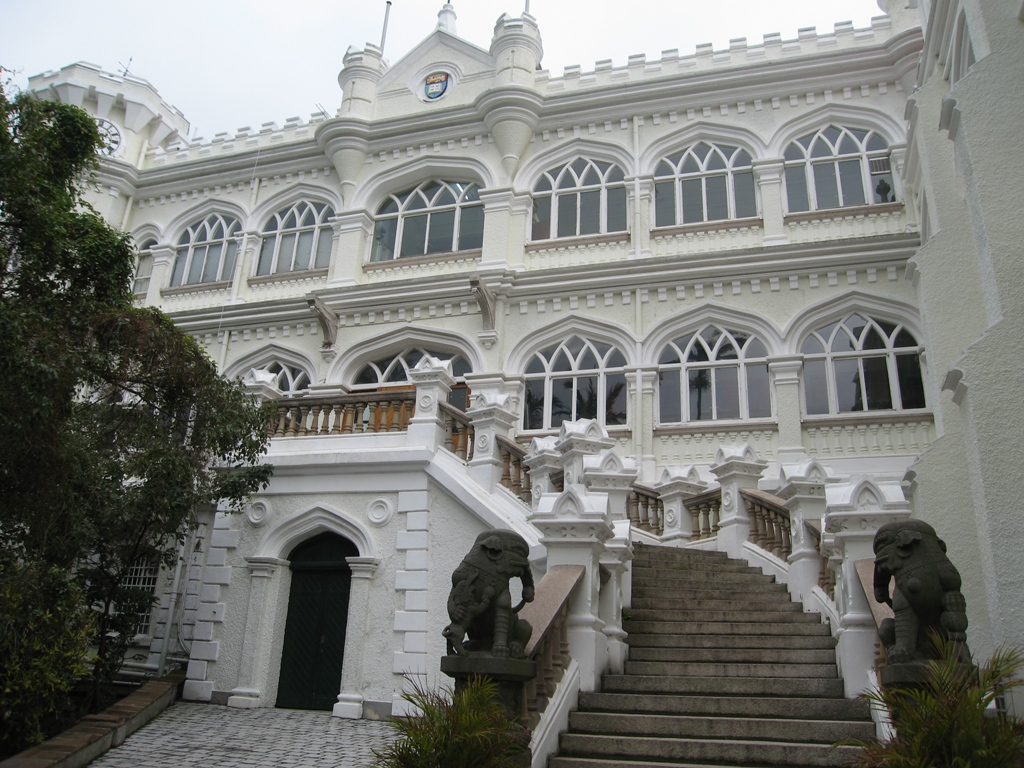
University Hall

=== Béthanie and the former dairy farm ===
Although the farm itself no longer exists, its remains and other colonial era institutions continue to exist serving, in some cases, other purposes. The former dairy farm can still be seen in the grassy slopes of the hills, but mainly in the two milking sheds that remain. They are between the new Vocational Training Center and the much older Béthanie. Béthanie and the cow sheds are presently administered by the Hong Kong Academy for Performing Arts, but were previously controlled by the University of Hong Kong which used Béthanie as headquarters for the HKU Press. The APA uses Béthanie and the cow sheds for various educational purposes, but also lends the chapel in Béthanie to St. John's Cathedral (Anglican) as the locale for Emmanuel Church - Pokfulam, a daughter (subordinate) church serving the west of Hong Kong Island.

Béthanie was built as a sanatorium between 1873 and 1875 for the French Catholic missionaries in China, better known as Missions Etrangères de Paris or MEP. Recently restored with loving care, Béthanie is now used by the Academy for the Performing Arts for educational purposes. Béthanie includes a small chapel. In its present restored configuration, this chapel seats about 100 and is used each Sunday by Emmanuel Church - Pokfulam, a daughter church of St. John's Cathedral. The Béthanie chapel is a beautiful Neo Gothic structure. Some of the original statuary and stained glass windows have been recovered and re-installed.

=== University Hall ===
Across the Pokfulam Road stands University Hall (U-Hall), is a residential unit for undergraduates of the University of Hong Kong. Originally, U-Hall was the residence of a merchant, but eventually, it came under the control of the same French Catholic missionaries who built Béthanie. It was extended greatly and printed religious literature in its basement in many languages for nearly 100 years. In the 1950s, when missionary work in China died, the building was given to the HK government which gave it to the University of Hong Kong as a student residential unit. It is smaller now than it used to be, but still houses 100 or so undergraduates. There was a chapel in the building: it now serves as the dining hall for the students. University Hall is much in demand as a location for movies, wedding photos, advertisements, and other purposes.

== Village ==
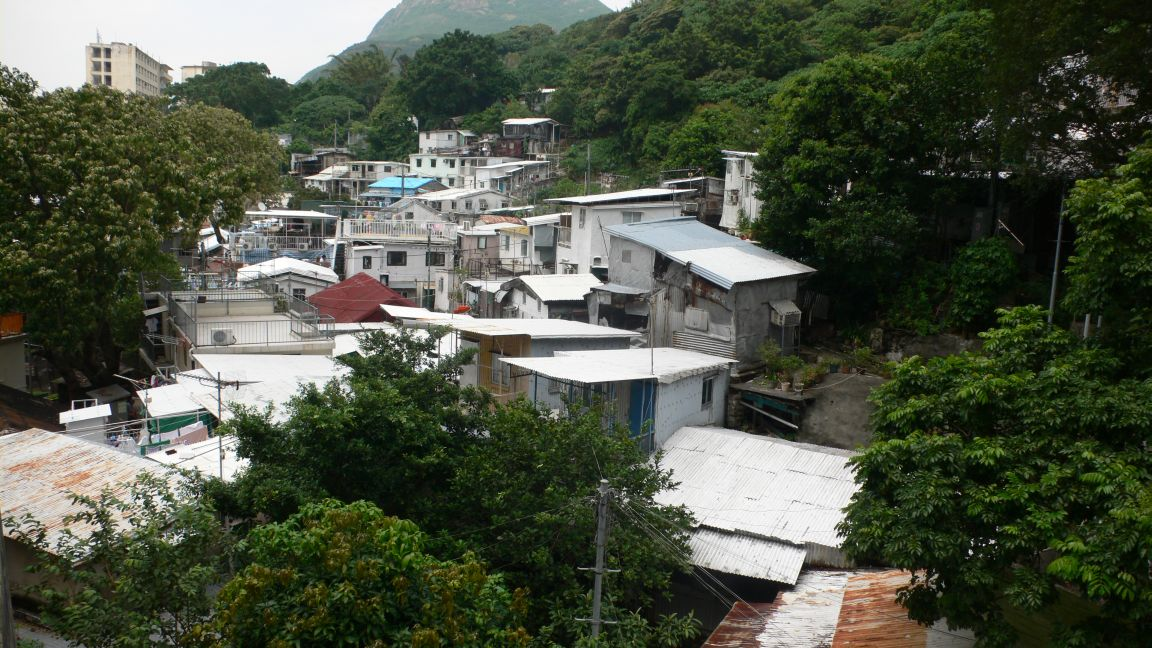
Pok Fu Lam Village

At the centre of Pok Fu Lam is an indigenous village, the Pok Fu Lam Village (薄扶林村), the only one of its kind remaining on Hong Kong Island. Often mistaken as a shanty town by the residents of the surrounding apartments, the conservation value of the village has been acknowledged by its inclusion on the 2014 World Monuments Watch by the World Monuments Fund.

=== History ===
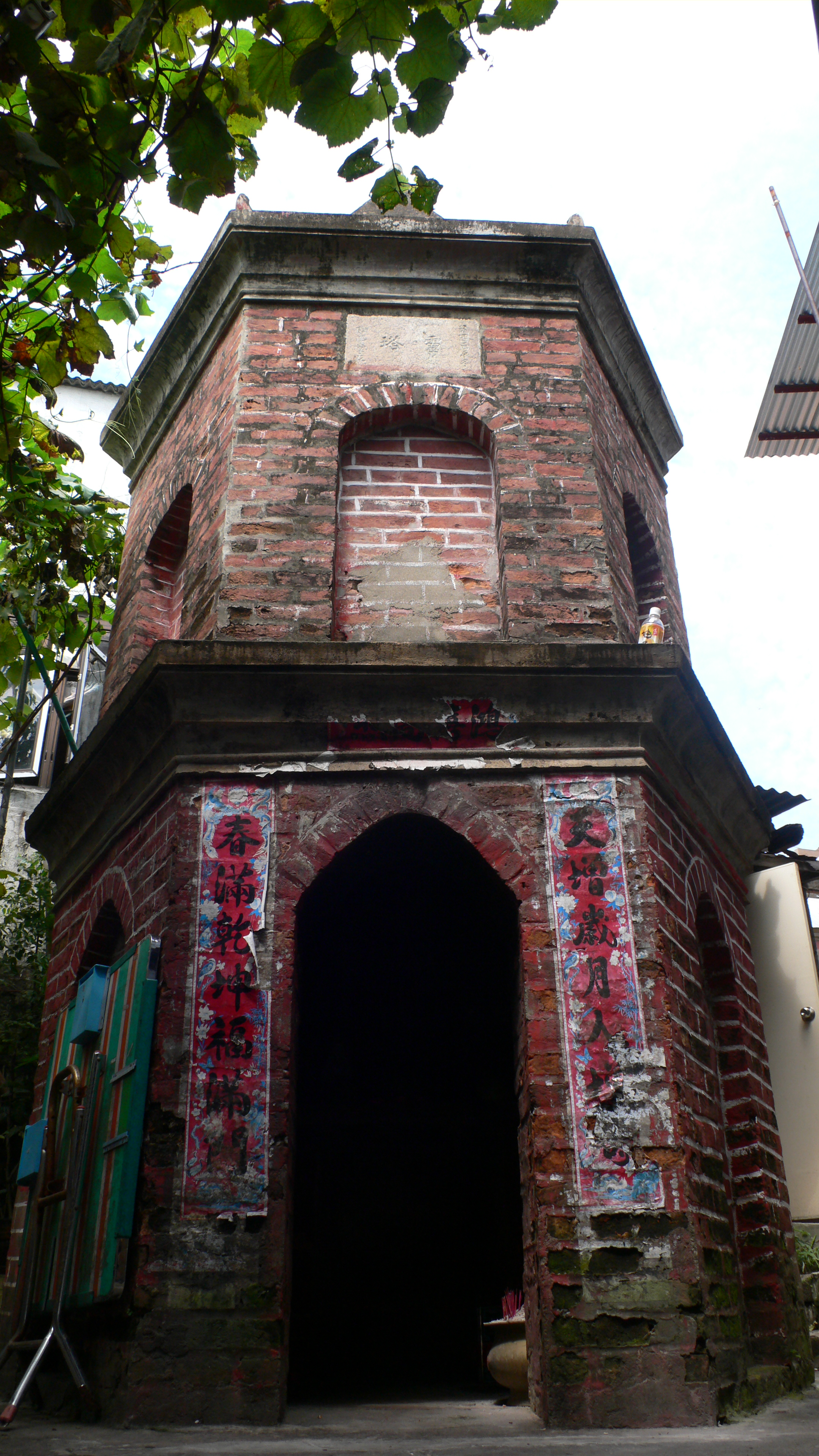
Lee Ling Fairy Tower

Pok Fu Lam Village is a historic village, which has existed since the beginning of the 17th century. Local residents in the past have repeatedly asked the government to give indigenous inhabitants of Pok Fu Lam the same recognition as residents of the New Territories. These claims have been rejected by the government which also threatened demolition of the village.

In the Kangxi period (late 17th century) of the Qing dynasty, approximately 2,000 people seeking asylum from turmoils in mainland China reached this village. The early villagers, mostly with the surnames of Chen, Huang, and Luo, were farmers. The "Xinan County Journal" of 1819 mentioned that Pok Fu Lam Village was one of three villages on Hong Kong Island (the other ones were at Stanley and Wong Chuk Hang). It was described as "built alongside the hill and the creek, its structures are quite elegant".

At the time of the 1911 census, the population of Pok Fu Lam was 833. The number of males was 580.

After the Second World War, the massive refugee influx seeking asylum from mainland China reached Hong Kong, resulting in the village population increasing from 20-odd households to more than 100 households. The original vegetable gardens were replaced by houses. It was not until the 1980s, when the Hong Kong economy experienced rapid growth, that the village population began to decrease, but many villagers remain in the village today.

=== Fire Dragon Festival ===
The villagers have their own festivals: the annual Fire Dragon Dance, the oldest of its kind in Hong Kong, is held during the Mid-Autumn Festival, and is organised entirely by the villagers, who strive to preserve the unique festival for the generations to come. Ng Kong-kin, master craftsman of the 73.3 metre long dragon, has been making these creatures for more than four decades, and continues to volunteer his time building the enormous beast every year; his brother Ng Kong-nan, supervises the training of the dancers and preparation for the annual celebrations. All villagers participate in the burning of incense and each household is blessed by the dragons as they dance through the village, making the festival a fundamental part of the village life. Many other less well known festivals include Bou Chun Tin, which commemorates Nüwa repairing the Wall of Heaven; Fa San Fuk, a ritual carried out on Lunar New Year's Eve for good fortune throughout the year; and Jip Nin Gang, when villagers calculate the best time in Chinese feng shui to welcome the new year, and prepare celebratory procedures for the particular moment.

=== Buildings ===
The forest village is divided into three parts: Middle is "Wai Chai", Northern portion is "the vegetable garden", the village tail is "Long Tzutu". There are few types of village house. Some are made of stone and hay with Chinese tiled pitched roof. Some Chinese tiled pitched roof had been replaced with galvanised steel roof. Some village houses are made of brick with concrete flat roof or galvanised steel roofs. In addition the village has a characteristic tower, named Li Ling Divine Pagoda or Li Ling Fairy Tower (李靈仙姐塔), which is approximately 5 metres high. The existing pagoda was rebuilt in 1916. The first pagoda was built of stone as advised by the elder villagers.

== Housing estates ==
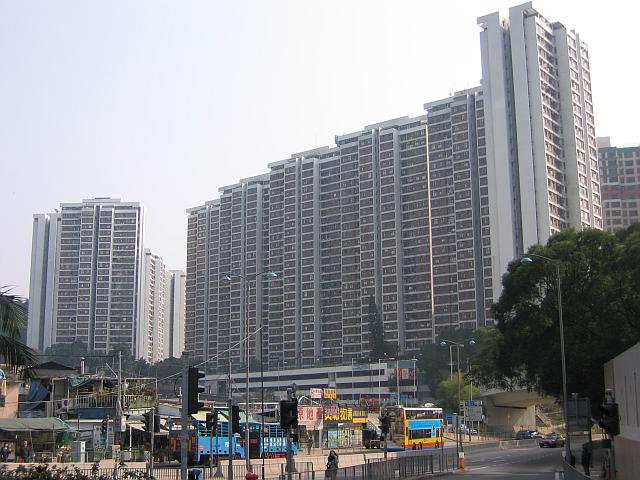
Chi Fu Fa Yuen, next to Pok Fu Lam Village

Pok Fu Lam is notable for its quiet, green living environment (by Hong Kong standard), attracting a significant number of expatriates, many of whom work at the nearby University of Hong Kong. Several private housing estates are located in Pok Fu Lam.

- Chi Fu Fa Yuen (置富花園) was developed in the mid-seventies by Hongkong Land. It comprises 20 towers of 28-storey high-rise buildings with a total of 4,258 residential units and 7 towers of 5-storey villa type low-rise buildings with 70 household units.
- Pokfulam Gardens
- Baguio Villa

== Education ==
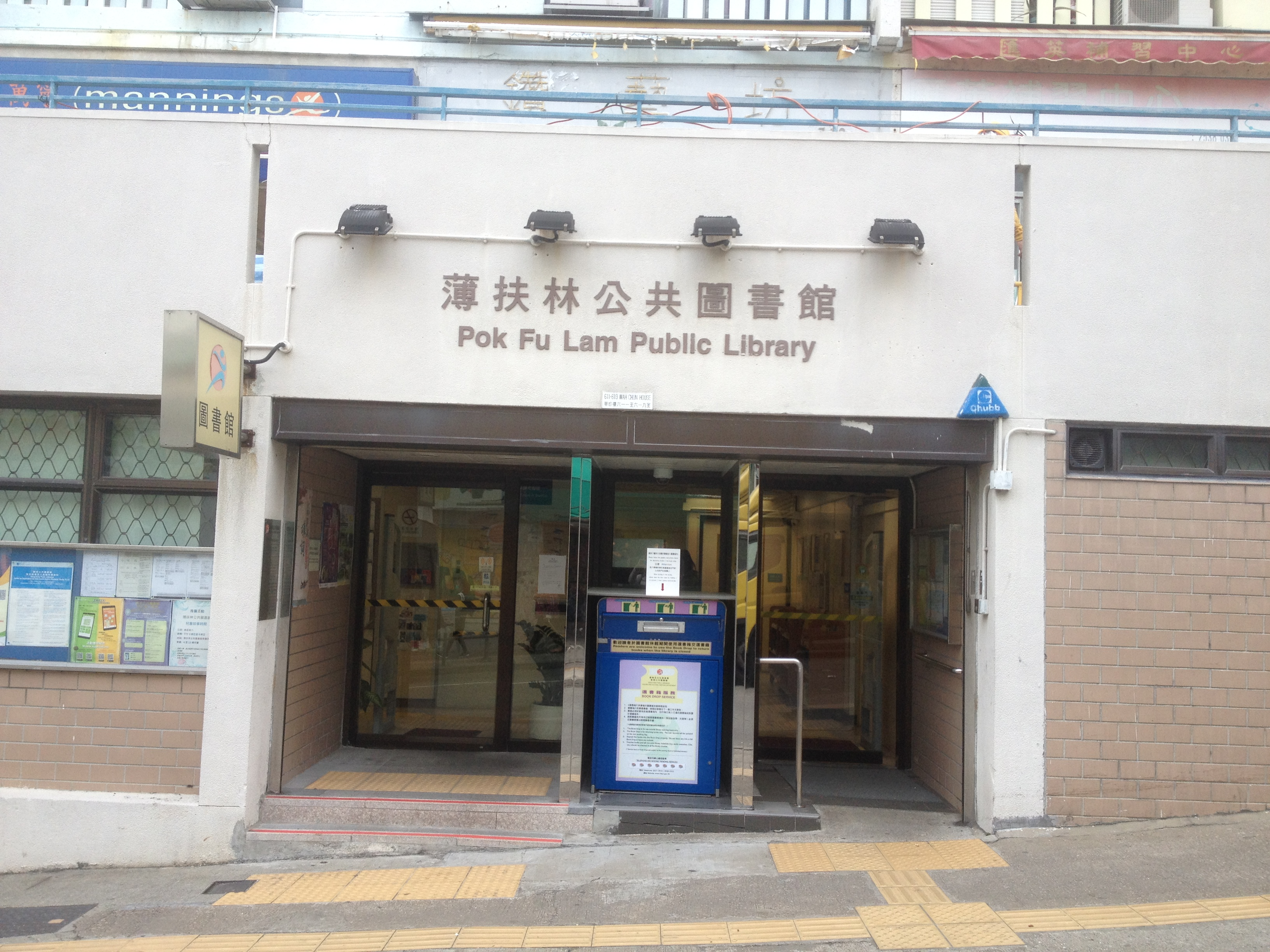
Pok Fu Lam Public Library, in Wah Fu Estate

Educational institutions in Pok Fu Lam include:

- German Swiss International School maintains a campus adjacent to Pok Fu Lam Village.
- Kellett School has a preparatory campus by the intersection between Pok Fu Lam Road and Shek Pai Wan Road.
- Ebenezer School & Home for the Visually Impaired is located along Pok Fu Lam Road.
- West Island School, a secondary school part of the English Schools Foundation is located along Victoria Road.
- Kennedy School, a primary school part of the English Schools Foundation is located along Sha Wan Drive.

Pok Fu Lam is in Primary One Admission (POA) School Net 18. Within the school net are multiple aided schools (operated independently but funded with government money) and Hong Kong Southern District Government Primary School (香港南區官立小學). Aided primary schools in Pok Fu Lam in POA 18 include SKH Chi Fu Chi Nam Primary School (聖公會置富始南小學) and Tung Wah Group of Hospitals Hok Shan School (香港華富邨華林徑5號).

Former schools

- Pokfulam Government Primary School Now the German Swiss School Pok Fu Lam Campus.

Hong Kong Public Libraries operates the Pokfulam Public Library in Wah Fu Estate.

== Hospital ==
- Queen Mary Hospital

== See also ==
- Cyberport
- Sandy Bay
- Pok Fu Lam Fire Dragon Dance
- List of places in Hong Kong
