= Three... Extremes =

2005 film by Fruit Chan, Park Chan-wook and Takashi Miike

- Theatrical release poster
- Directed by: Fruit Chan; Park Chan-wook; Takashi Miike
- Written by: Dumplings: Lilian Lee; Cut: Park Chan-wook; Box: Bun Saikou; Haruko Fukushima
- Produced by: Ahn Soo-hyun; Peter Ho-sun Chan; Fumio Inoue; Naoki Sato; Shun Shimizu
- Starring: Bai Ling; Tony Leung Ka-fai; Lee Byung-hun; Im Won-hee; Kyōko Hasegawa; Atsuro Watabe
- Cinematography: Chung Chung-hoon; Christopher Doyle; Koichi Kawakami
- Edited by: Fruit Chan; Chan Ki-hop; Kim Jae-beom; Kim Sang-bum; Yasushi Shimamura
- Music by: Chan Kwong-wing; Kōji Endō; Peach Present
- Production companies: Applause Pictures; CJ Entertainment; Kadokawa Pictures
- Distributed by: Lions Gate Films (United States)
- Release date: August 20, 2004
- Running time: 125 minutes
- Countries: Hong Kong; Japan; South Korea
- Languages: Cantonese; Mandarin; Japanese; Korean
- Box office: $1.5 million

Three... Extremes (Chinese: 三更2; pinyin: Sāngēng 2; Korean: 쓰리, 몬스터; RR: Sseuli, Monseuteo; Japanese: 美しい夜、残酷な朝; Utsukushī Yoru, Zankokuna Asa) is a 2004 horror anthology film. A follow-up to Three (2002), it follows the same concept of three individual segments by directors from three East Asian countries.

The segments are, in order: Dumplings, directed by Fruit Chan (Hong Kong), Cut, directed by Park Chan-wook (South Korea), and Box, directed by Takashi Miike (Japan).

Dumplings was also released as a theatrical feature film the same year, with additional scenes and a different ending. Although a sequel to Three, Extremes was released before the original in the United States, leading Three to be released in the United States as Three... Extremes II, repackaged as a faux sequel.

== Films ==
=== Dumplings ===
Aging actress Mrs. Li wants to rejuvenate her youth and beauty to attract the attention of her husband, Li, who has secretly taken a mistress behind her back. She buys dumplings from Aunt Mei, a mysterious seller who claims to be much older than she appears. However, to her disgust, she learns that the dumplings are in fact made from aborted fetuses, which Mei takes from a nearby hospital that has a secret abortion facility, as well as working as an abortion midwife herself.

Nevertheless, Mrs. Li decides to continue eating the fetus dumplings. One of them, made from a five-month-old fetus (the oldest of the aborted fetuses thus far), seems to have a positive effect on Mrs. Li's libido. However, since the fetus was "cursed" due to being a product of incest, it also causes her skin to exhibit a fishy smell. Eventually, Mei has to move out when the authorities are about to capture her. Mrs. Li, now two months pregnant despite being declared infertile earlier, is still desperate for a rejuvenation and performs an abortion on herself. She licks some blood off her chin with an inhumanly long tongue. Finally, she eats another dumpling.

=== Cut ===
A successful film director has to face a night of misery when a man who appeared in all five of his films as an extra captures both him and his wife to play a deadly game. The wife, a pianist, is gagged and trapped in a system of sharp wires at her piano. The director is instructed to strangle a young girl the extra met earlier in the day, or else the extra will chop off the wife's fingers one by one every five minutes. The extra reveals that he kidnapped the couple because he is jealous that the director is able to be a rich and good man, while he is poor and abusive to his wife and son, the former of whom he murdered before the incident.

The director tries to buy time by telling stories of his infidelity, though the extra continues to chop the wife's fingers until only one remains on her left hand. The director ultimately decides to kill the young girl by strangling her. He tries, but does not quite succeed in killing her. The young girl's wig comes off and she is revealed to be a boy — the extra's son. The extra is only stopped when he slips after stepping on a bloody ring that the wife was wearing before he chopped off her ring finger. The wife then bites the extra's neck, pushing him into the wires that imprison her, leaving him bleeding to death. Traumatized and delusional, the director, now believing his wife to be the extra's son, strangles her to death.

=== Box ===
Kyoko, a 25-year-old novelist, frequently experiences nightmares of her past as a circus performer. When she was 10 years old, Kyoko worked in a circus with her twin sister Shoko and their benefactor Higata. Kyoko felt that Higata was favoring Shoko over her when he praised her after a performance. When Shoko was training, Kyoko forced and locked her into a box. However, Higata watched the incident and tried to rescue her, only for Kyoko to scar him in the face and then accidentally set the box on fire. Since then, Kyoko is haunted with guilt and wants to apologize to her sister. She is also struck uncannily by her literature publisher, Yoshii, who is a doppelgänger of Higata, except that he is more caring to her.

One day, Kyoko follows an invitation to her old circus, only to discover the box containing Shoko's burned remains. She is confronted by Higata, who is distraught after the incident and tells her that both Kyoko and Shoko are important to him, but only as one entity. After luring her into kissing him, he forces her into a plastic sack, fits it into a box, then buries it in the nearby snowy ground. However, it is revealed that the entire event of the film is just another dream of Kyoko, who in reality has been conjoined with Shoko since birth. The sisters exit the house to meet with Higata/Yoshii, both indeed the same person.

== Cast ==
=== Dumplings ===
- Miriam Yeung as Mrs Li
- Bai Ling as Mei
- Pauline Lau as Li's maid
- Tony Leung Ka-fai as Li
- Meme Tian as Connie

=== Cut ===
- Lee Byung-hun as Director
- Im Won-hee as Stranger
- Kang Hye-jung as Director's wife
- Yum Jung-ah as actress in vampire role

=== Box ===
- Kyōko Hasegawa as Kyoko
- Atsuro Watabe as Yoshii/Higata
- Mai Suzuki as Young Kyoko
- Yuu Suzuki as Young Shoko

== Dumplings theatrical ==
Three... Extremes' first film Dumplings was extended and turned into a full-length theatrical film of the same name that was released into British cinemas by Tartan Films in the spring of 2006.

== Release ==
Three... Extremes was theatrically released on October 28, 2005 by Lionsgate. After its release on November 17, 2005, the film has grossed $77,532 in North America and $1,516,056 in other territories, for a worldwide total of $1,593,588.

=== Critical response ===
Three...Extremes received generally positive reviews. Review aggregator Rotten Tomatoes gave the film an 85% approval rating based on 61 reviews, with an average rating of 6.8 out of 10; its consensus reads: "This anthology contains brutal, powerful horror stories by three of Asia's top directors." Metacritic, which assigns a normalized rating out of 100 to reviews from mainstream critics, gave the film an average score of 66 out of 100 based on 22 reviews, indicating "generally favorable reviews".

Chicago Sun-Times critic Roger Ebert praised the film by giving it 3½ stars out of 4, describing the films as "deeply, profoundly creepy", and he attributed their qualities to the works of famous horror writers Edgar Allan Poe, H. P. Lovecraft and Stephen King. The New York Times' Dana Stevens gave a positive review, writing: "Though Three Extremes [sic] may seem tame to jaded fans of what has been termed New Asian Horror, it serves as a fine introduction to the genre for those who are curious but squeamish." The Boston Globe's Ty Burr gave a favorable review, advising viewers to "fasten your seat belts for a bumpy ride -- narratively and artistically -- and don't go in on a full stomach."
