= Tai Hang =

Area on Hong Kong Island

Tai Hang Chinese: 大坑
- Village
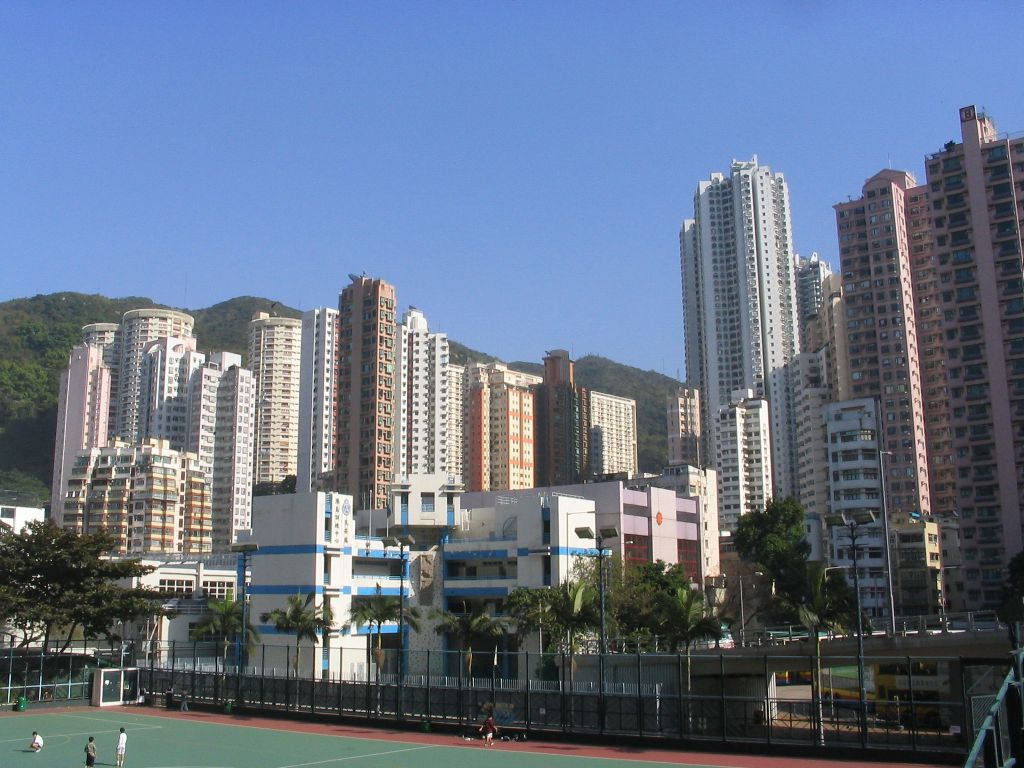
- Tai Hang

- Location within Hong Kong
- Coordinates: 22.27444°N 114.19383°E
- Country: People's Republic of China
- Special administrative region: Hong Kong
- Island: Hong Kong Island
- Time zone: UTC+8:00 (HKT)

Tai Hang
- Traditional Chinese: 大坑
- Simplified Chinese: 大坑
Transcriptions
Standard Mandarin
- Hanyu Pinyin: Dàkēng
- IPA: [tâ.kʰə́ŋ]
Wu
- Wugniu: du^{6} khaon^{1}
- IPA: Shanghainese: [du˩ kʰɑ̃˦]
Yue: Cantonese
- Jyutping: daai^{6} haang^{1}
- IPA: [taj˨.haŋ˥]

Tai Hang (Chinese: 大坑; Jyutping: daai^{6} haang^{1}; lit. 'The Big Water Channel') is an area southeast of Causeway Bay located in the mid-north of Hong Kong Island in Hong Kong. It is home to many luxurious private apartments. Residents are predominantly more affluent Hong Kong locals and expatriate professionals.

== Geography ==
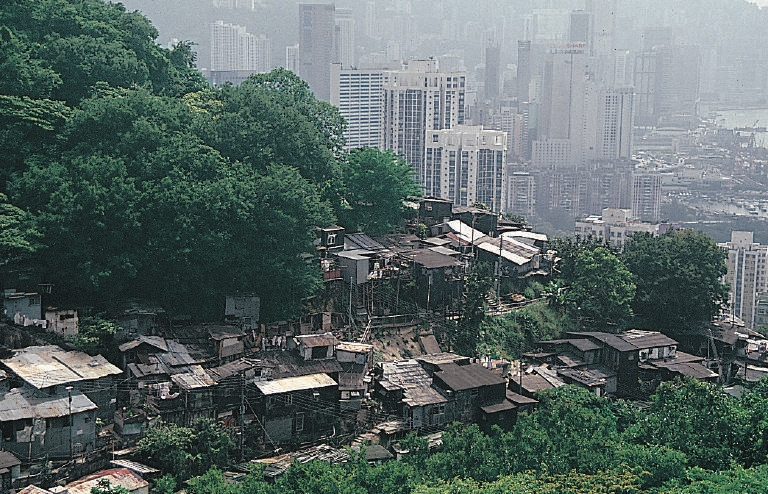
Tai Hang in the 1980s

Tai Hang is a valley with an opening to Causeway Bay in north and So Kon Po in west. To its south and east are hills. The former coastline is marked by Tung Lo Wan Road and the main road Tai Hang Road winds in the hills throughout the area.

The name of Tai Hang, literally "big nullah", originates from the nullah that passed through the area. The nullah has been covered and made subterranean -- this has been converted into Wun Sha Street and Fire Dragon Trail.

The area of Tai Hang is divided into upper and lower areas. The upper area includes a public housing estate Lai Tak Tsuen and some highrise residential blocks for affluents, such as Illumination Terrace (光明臺, 5-7 Tai Hang Road) or Ronsdale Garden (龍華花園, 25 Tai Hang Drive). The lower area has many old residential blocks, with a number of restaurants along the streets. It is named after a stream (or drainage) from nearby hills.

== Features ==
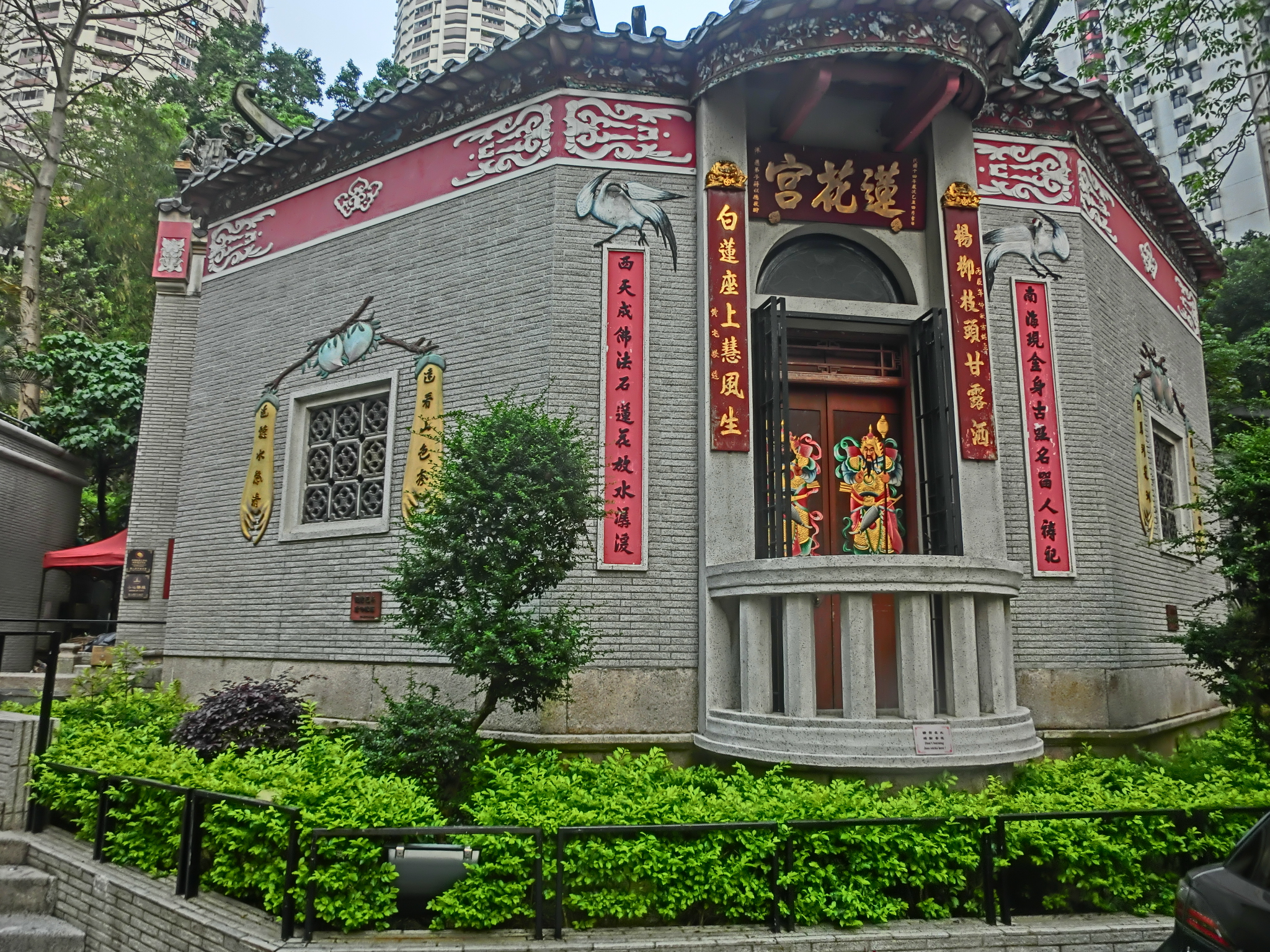
Lin Fa Temple in Tai Hang

The northern area has seen significant numbers of restaurants open, making Tai Hang a hot spot for dining and leisure.

Lai Tak Tsuen is located in the area. The famous Tiger Balm Garden was also located in the area.

The Lin Fa Temple is located at the end of Lin Fa Kung Street. It was originally built 1863, during the Qing Dynasty, and was reconstructed in 1986 and 1999. The original use of the temple was a worship place for Kwan Yin, the goddess of mercy.

== Landscape ==
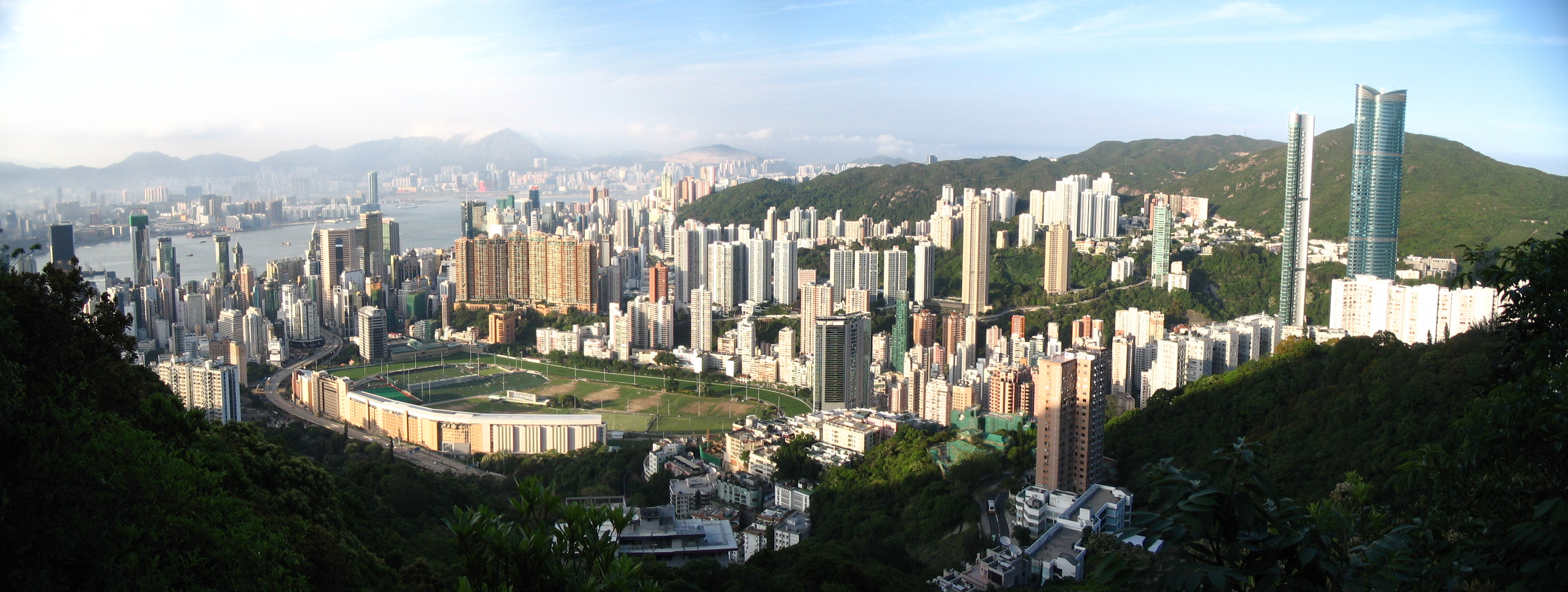
From Mount Cameron overlooking to the areas of Tai Hang, Happy Valley and Jardine's Lookout

== Tai Hang fire dragon dance ==
Tai Hang Fire Dragon Dance

For the three nights straddling the Mid-Autumn Festival, the Tai Hang fire dragon dance is held in Tai Hang. The main attraction is a 67-metre-long 'fire dragon' that winds its way with much fanfare and smoke through a collection of streets located in Tai Hang, close to Victoria Park in Causeway Bay. Fire dragon dance started in 1880 when Tai Hang was a small Hakka village of farmers and fishermen on the waterfront of Causeway Bay. This custom has been followed every year since 1880, with the exception of the period during the Japanese Occupation, the 1967 disturbances, and the COVID-19 pandemic.

According to local legend, over a century ago, a few days before the Mid-Autumn Festival, a typhoon and then a plague wreaked havoc on the village. While the villagers were repairing the damage, a python entered the village and ate their livestock. According to some villagers, the python was the son of the Dragon King. A soothsayer decreed the only way to stop the chaos was to stage a fire dance for three days and nights during the upcoming mid-autumn festival. The villagers made a huge dragon of straw and covered it with incense sticks, which they then lit. Accompanied by drummers and erupting firecrackers, they danced for three days and three nights – and the plague disappeared.

== Housing ==
Most housing estates in the area are private with the exception of Lai Tak Tsuen (16 Lai Tak Tsuen Road, Causeway Bay):

- Carnation Court (41-47 Tai Hang Road, Causeway Bay)
- Cherry Court (12-14 Tai Hang Road, Causeway Bay)
- Coho (18 School Street, Causeway Bay)
- Concord Villas (65-67 Wun Sha Street, Causeway Bay)
- Dragon Centre (21-25 Wun Sha Street, Causeway Bay)
- The First Mansion (78 Tung Lo Wan Road, Causeway Bay)
- Fontana Gardens (Ka Ning Path, Causeway Bay)
- Fook Hing Court (63 Wun Sha Street, Causeway Bay)
- Harvest Moon Villa (5 Fuk Kwan Avenue, Causeway Bay)
- Gardenview Heights (19 Tai Hang Drive, Causeway Bay)
- Illumination Terrance (5-7 Tai Hang Road, Causeway Bay)
- Intelligent Court (36-40A Tung Lo Wan Road, Causeway Bay)
- Jolly Villa (8 Tai Hang Road, Causeway Bay)
- Jones Hives (8 Jones Street, Causeway Bay)
- Little Tai Hang (98 Tung Lo Wan Road, Causeway Bay)
- Rhenish Mansion (1-9 Lin Fa Kung Street East, Causeway Bay)
- Ronsdale Garden (25 Tai Hang Drive, Causeway Bay)
- Serenade (11 Tai Hang Road, Causeway Bay)
- The Jolly Court (16 Lin Fa Kung Street West, Causeway Bay)
- The Legend (23 Tai Hang Drive, Causeway Bay)
- The Warren (9 Warren Street, Causeway Bay)
- Trafalgar Court (70 Tai Hang Road, Causeway Bay)
- Warrenwoods (23 Warren Street, Causeway Bay)
- Wun Sha Tower (33-45 Wun Sha Street, Causeway Bay)
- Y.I (70 Tai Hang Road, Causeway Bay)

== Education ==
Tai Hang is under School Net 12 in the Primary One Admission (POA). Multiple government and aided schools are located in Tai Hang, which being the following:

- True Light Middle School of Hong Kong
- Hotung Secondary School

== See also ==
- Pok Fu Lam Village Fire Dragon Dance
