= Shui On Centre =

- 瑞安中心
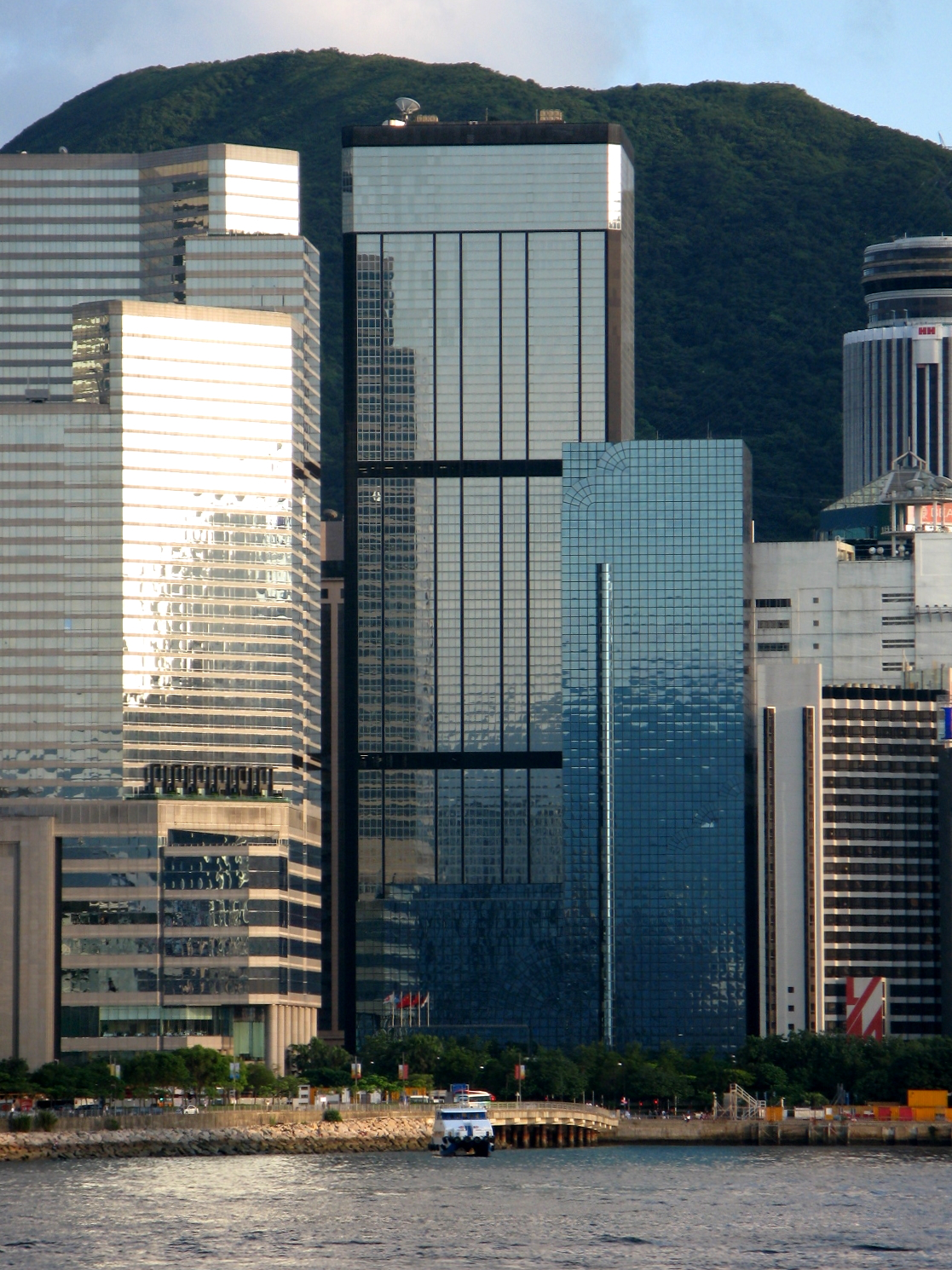
- Shui On Centre, in front of the taller Revenue Tower
- Interactive map of the Shui On Centre area

General information
- Status: Completed
- Type: Commercial offices
- Location: 6-8 Harbour Road, Wan Chai North, Hong Kong
- Coordinates: 22°16′48.65″N 114°10′17.29″E
- Construction started: March 1986; 40 years ago
- Completed: May 1987; 38 years ago

Height
- Roof: 118.50 m (388.8 ft)

Technical details
- Floor count: 35

Design and construction
- Architects: Shui On Properties; Simon Kwan & Associates Ltd
- Main contractor: Shui On Contractors

Shui On Centre
- Chinese: 瑞安中心
Transcriptions
Standard Mandarin
- Hanyu Pinyin: Ruì'ān Zhōngxīn
Yue: Cantonese
- Jyutping: seoi6 on1 zung1 sam1

Shui On Centre (Chinese: 瑞安中心) is a 35-storey Grade A office building in Wan Chai North, Hong Kong. The building was completed in May 1987.

In neighbours the Hong Kong Convention and Exhibition Centre and Grand Hyatt Hong Kong.

It has the head office of the publisher of the Hong Kong Post.

== See also ==
- Shui On Land, the flagship property company of the Hong Kong–based Shui On Group
