= Fleming Road =

Road in Hong Kong

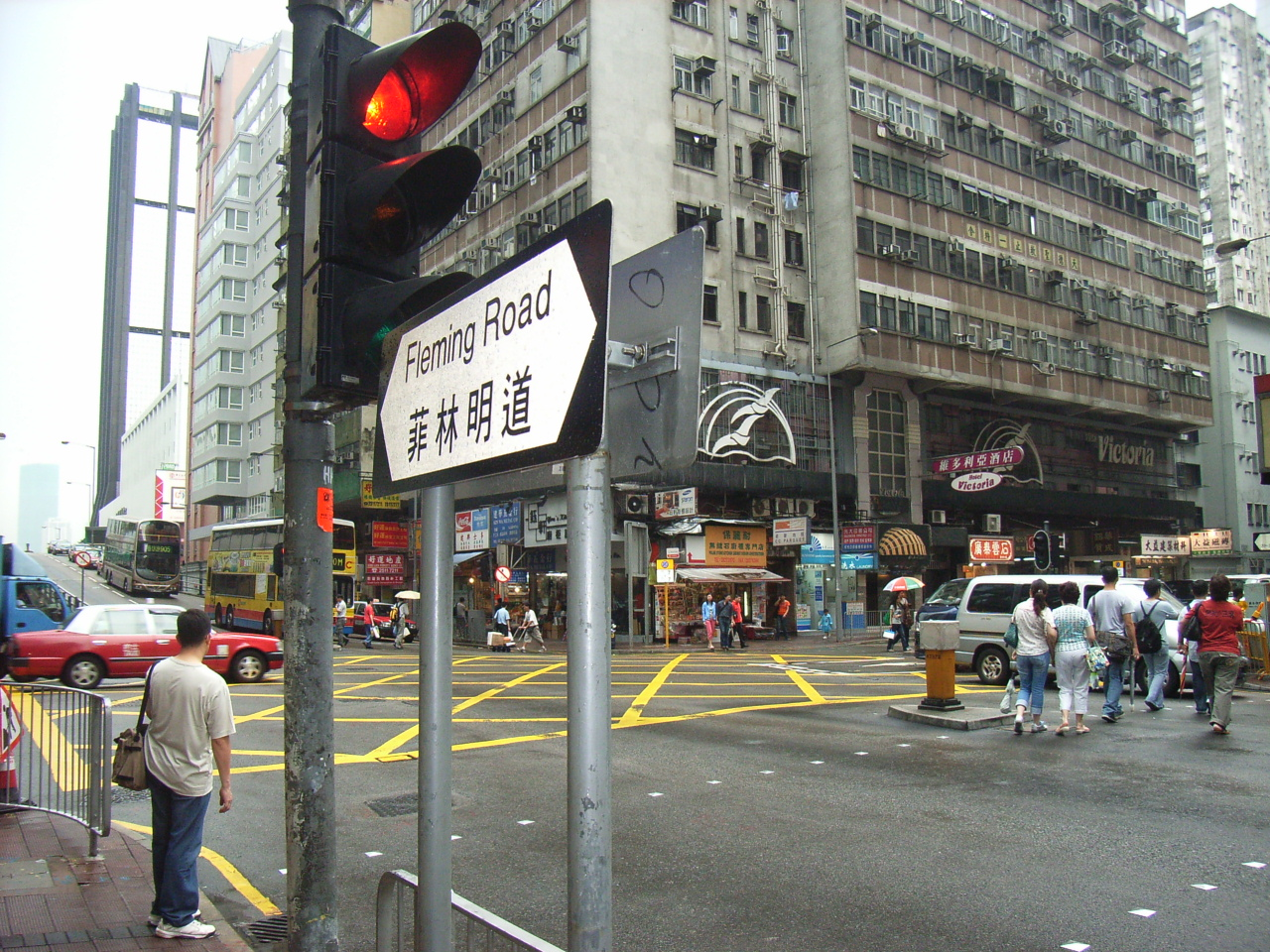
Fleming Road, Wan Chai in September 2006

Fleming Road (Chinese: 菲林明道) is a road in Wan Chai and Wan Chai North on the Hong Kong Island of Hong Kong. The road begins south with Johnston Road, runs across Hennessy Road, Lockhart Road and Jaffe Road, flies over Gloucester Road and runs across Harbour Road and ends at the junction with Convention Avenue and Expo Drive East.

== History ==
The road was named after Francis Fleming, Colonial Secretary of Hong Kong between 1890 and 1892. The road was built on the 1921 reclamation. In the 1970s, another reclamation extended the road to Wan Chai North by the Victoria Harbour.

At the junction of Fleming Road and Lockhart Road, a 3-storey building housed comfort women for the Japanese Army during the Japanese occupation of Hong Kong between 1940 and 1945.

On 17 December 2005, during the WTO Ministerial Conference of 2005, protestors from South Korea broke the police defense line on Lockhart Road and rushed along Fleming Road in an attempt to break into the Hong Kong Convention and Exhibition Centre in Wan Chai North. A full scale clash with the Hong Kong Police Force took place at this road and Central Plaza.

== See also ==
- List of streets and roads in Hong Kong
