= Grand Hyatt Hong Kong =

Hyatt-branded hotel in Hong Kong

- Chinese: 香港君悅酒店
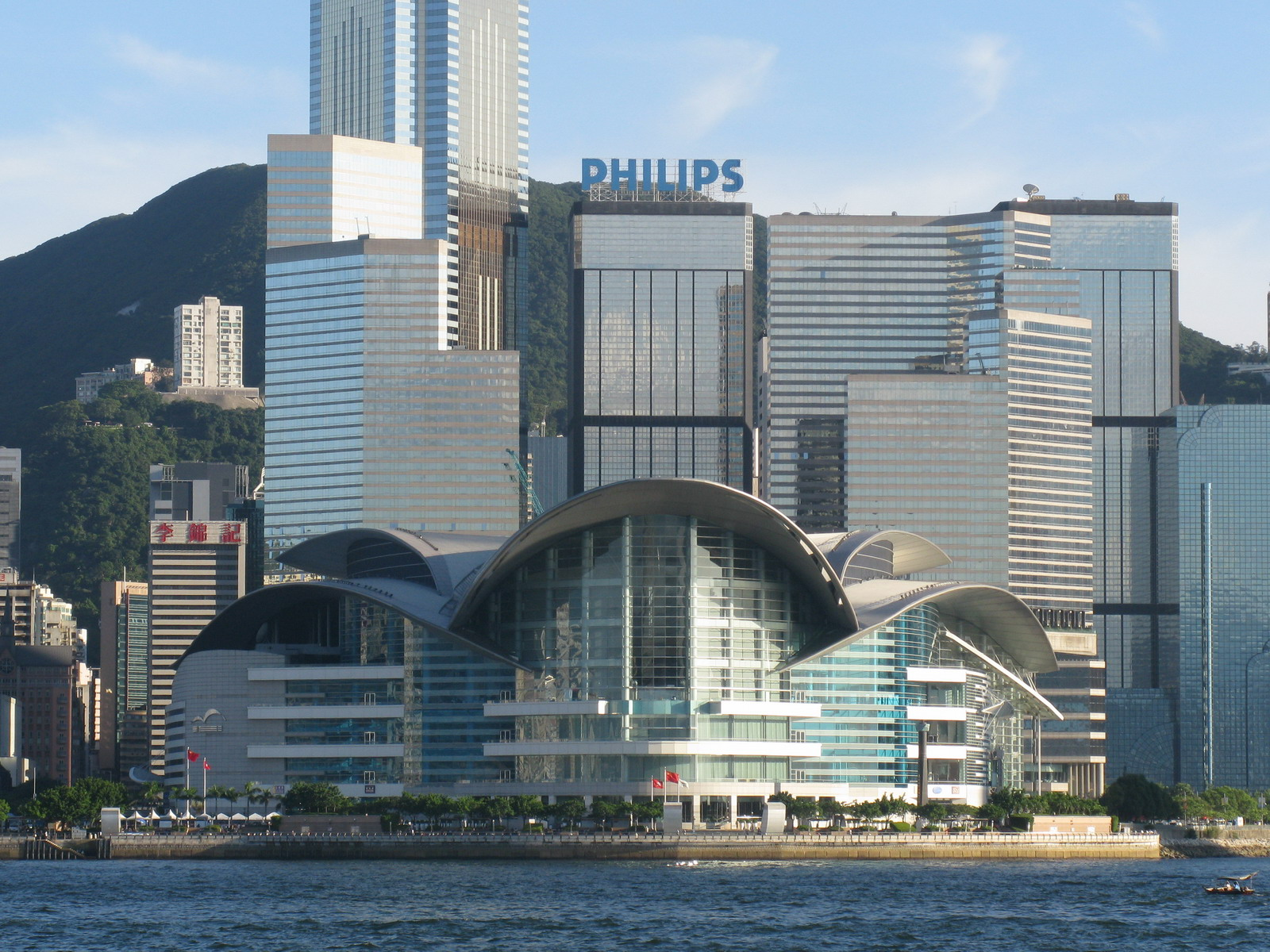
- The hotel is in the tower behind the Hong Kong Convention and Exhibition Centre.

- Location within Hong Kong urban core

General information
- Location: 1 Harbour Road, Wan Chai, Hong Kong
- Coordinates: 22°16′52″N 114°10′19″E
- Opening: 21 November 1989; 36 years ago
- Owner: New World Development
- Operator: Hyatt Hotels Corporation

Website
- www.hyatt.com/en-US/hotel/china/grand-hyatt-hong-kong/hkggh

Grand Hyatt Hong Kong
- Traditional Chinese: 香港君悅酒店
- Simplified Chinese: 香港君悦酒店
Transcriptions
Standard Mandarin
- Hanyu Pinyin: Xiānggǎng Jūnyuè Jiǔdiàn
Yue: Cantonese
- Jyutping: hoeng1 gong2 gwan1 jyut6 zau2 dim3

The Grand Hyatt Hong Kong is a luxury Hyatt hotel in Hong Kong, and the Asian flagship of Hyatt International. It has been described in a New York Times travel article as a "world-famous prestige" property. It opened on 21 November 1989 and is located at 1 Harbour Road, Wan Chai, adjacent to the Hong Kong Convention and Exhibition Centre.

The hotel has 11 food and beverage outlets.

Club floor rooms provide access to a lounge on the higher floors.

== VIP visits ==
The Grand Hyatt Hong Kong has been attended by heads of state and heads of government including Bill Clinton in 1998 and Hu Jintao, Zhu Rongji and Li Keqiang in their first visit to Hong Kong.

== Plateau Spa ==
In 2004, the 11th floor was converted into a spa and "hotel with a hotel" named "The Plateau" at a cost of some US$10 million. Plateau Spa was awarded as "Top 15 World's Best Spas" by a Travel + Leisure readers' poll in 2007. Encouraged by the results of the experiment, Hyatt now plans to install spas in all its Park Hyatt and some other Grand Hyatt brand hotels.
