= Wan Chai =

Area of Hong Kong Island

Coordinates: 22°16′47″N 114°10′18″E

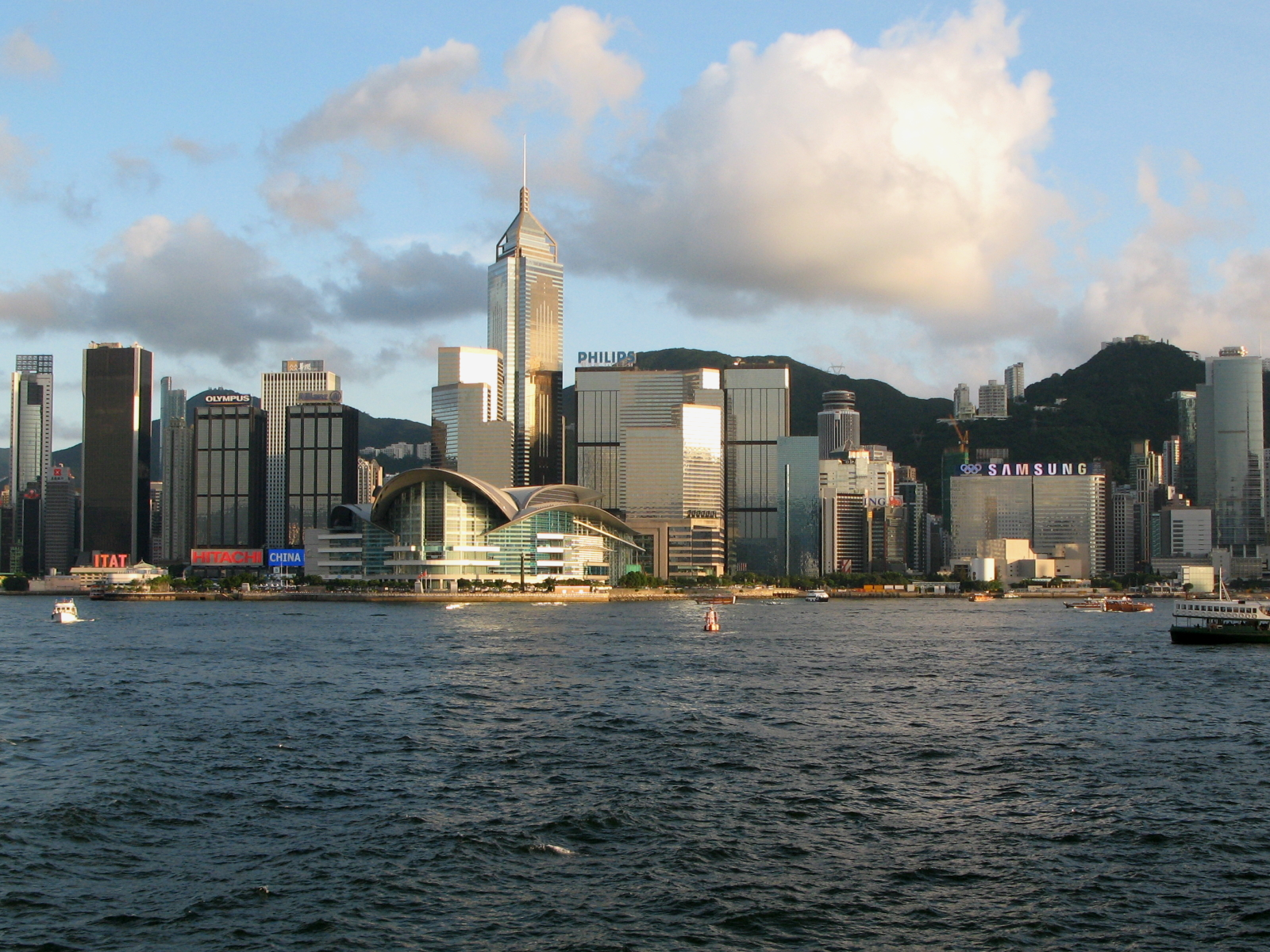
- Wan Chai as seen from Victoria Harbour
- Traditional Chinese: 灣仔
- Simplified Chinese: 湾仔
- Cantonese Yale: Wāan dzái
- Jyutping: waan^{1} zai^{2}
- Literal meaning: "small bay" or "cove"
Transcriptions
Standard Mandarin
- Hanyu Pinyin: Wānzǎi
Wu
- Wugniu: uae^{1} tse^{3}
- IPA: [ué tsè] (Shanghainese)
Yue: Cantonese
- Yale Romanization: Wāan dzái
- Jyutping: waan^{1} zai^{2}
- IPA: [wáːn tsɐ̌i]

Location of Wan Chai within Hong Kong SAR

Wan Chai (Chinese: 灣仔; Jyutping: waan1 zai2) is an area of the western part of Wan Chai District on the northern shore of Hong Kong Island, Hong Kong. It is bounded by Canal Road to the east, Arsenal Street to the west, and Bowen Road to the south. The area north of Gloucester Road is often called Wan Chai North.

Wan Chai is one of the busiest commercial areas in Hong Kong with offices of many small and medium-sized companies. Wan Chai North features office towers, parks, hotels and an international conference and exhibition centre. Wan Chai is also well known for its famous night life which has evolved over decades. As one of the first areas developed in Hong Kong, the locale is densely populated but facing urban decay. The government has undertaken several urban renewal projects in recent years. There are various landmarks and skyscrapers within the area, most notably the Hong Kong Convention and Exhibition Centre (HKCEC), Central Plaza and Hopewell Centre.

== Names ==
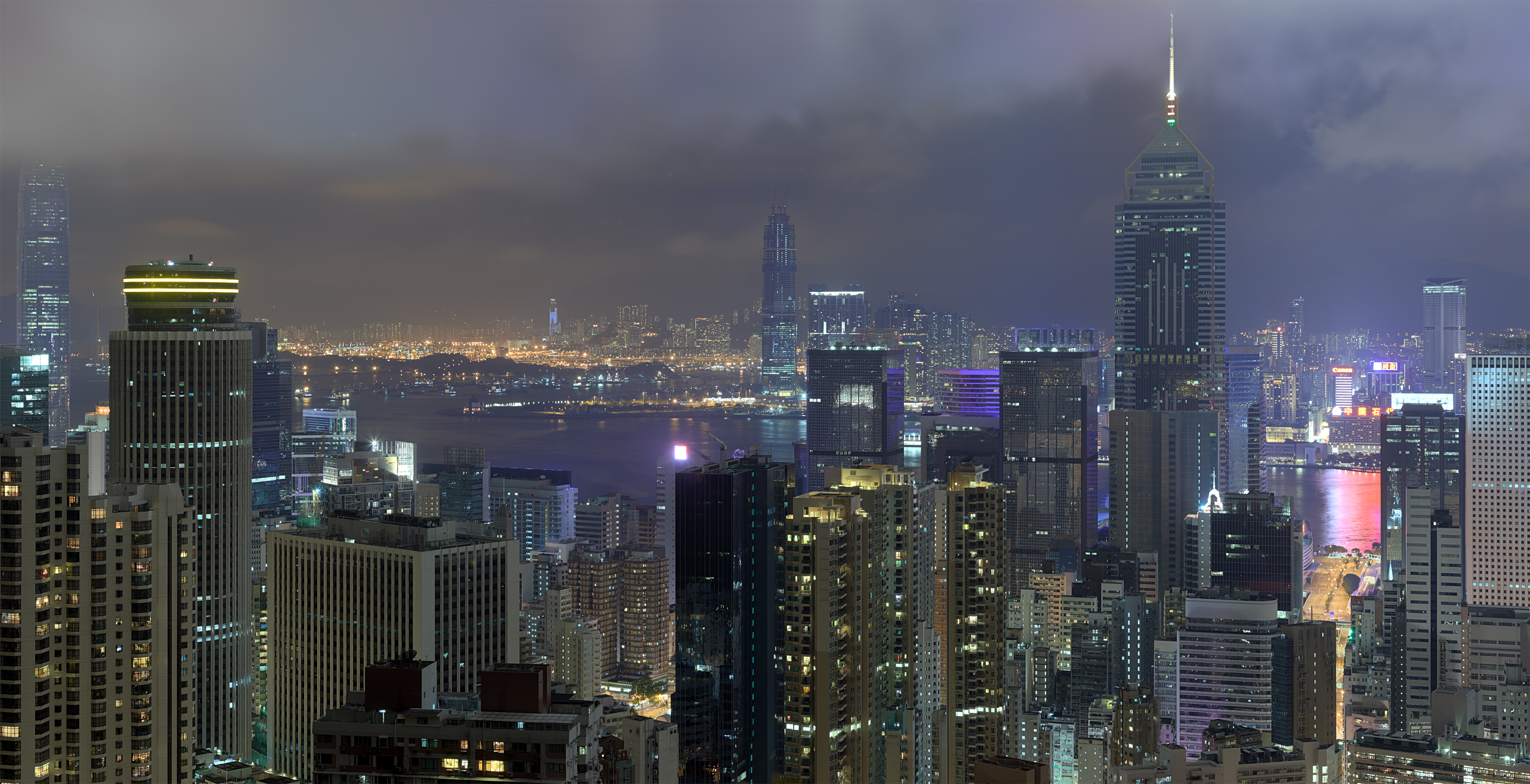
Panorama of Wan Chai, Hong Kong, taken from a lookout along Stubbs Road near Victoria Peak

Wan Chai originally began as Ha Wan (下環), literally meaning "a bottom ring" or "lower circuit". As one of the earliest developed areas in Hong Kong along the Victoria Harbour, Central ("centre ring" in Chinese), Sheung Wan ("upper ring"), Sai Wan ("western ring") and Wan Chai are collectively known as the four rings (四環) by the locals. Wan Chai literally means "a cove" in Cantonese, from the shape of its coastal line; however, owing to drastic city development and continual land reclamation, the area is no longer a cove.

== History ==
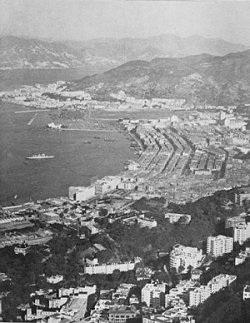
The coastline of Wan Chai in the early 1960s

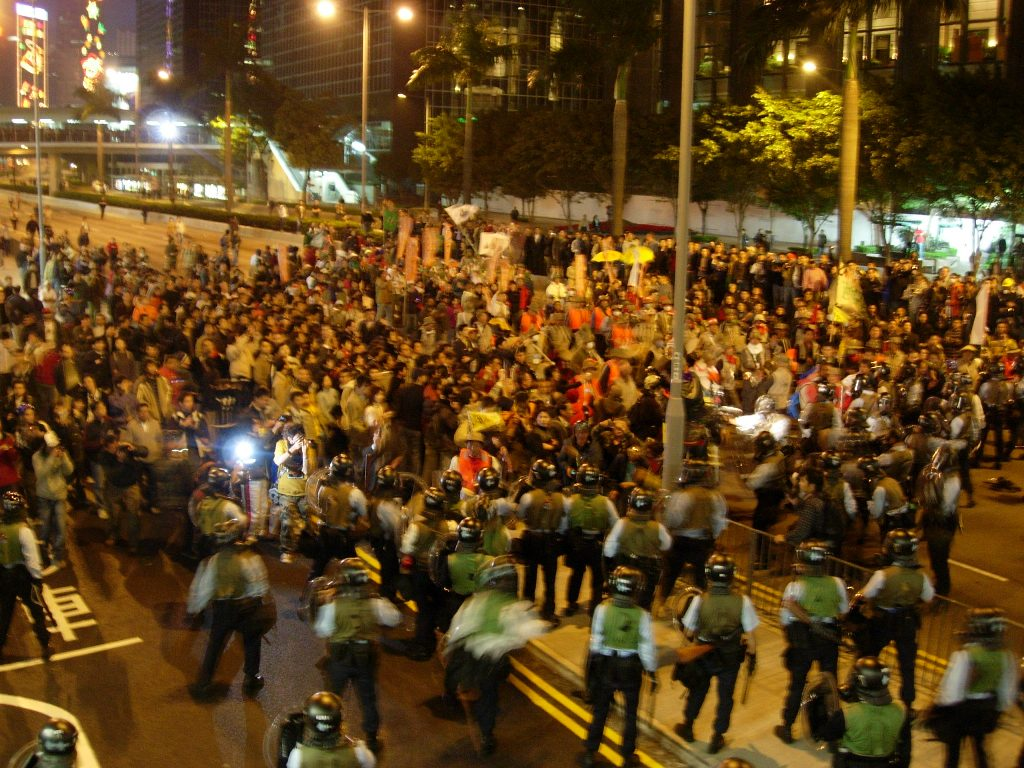
Protest zones were set up in Wan Chai for the international 2005 WTO conference

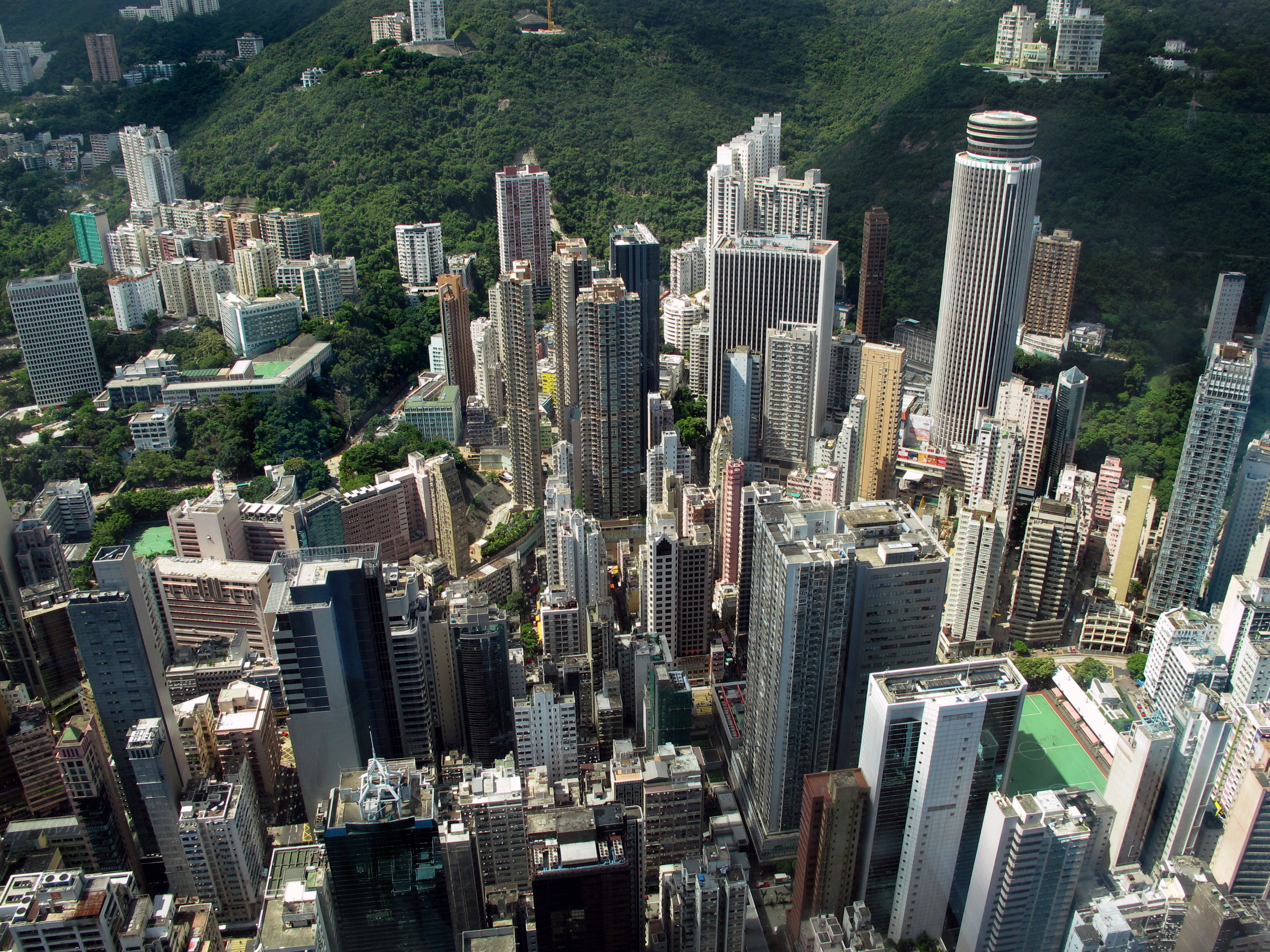
High density buildings in Wan Chai

Wan Chai was the first home to many Chinese villagers living along the undisturbed coastlines in proximity to Hung Shing Temple. Most of them were fishermen, who worked around the area near Hung Shing Temple overlooking the entire harbour. Hung Shing Ye, the God of the Sea, was one of the deities worshipped by the locals.

=== British Colony (from 1842) ===
With the growth of the British Hong Kong administration, centred in old Victoria (modern Central), Wan Chai attracted those on the fringes of society, such as "coolie" workers, who came to live on Queen's Road East. A focal point of development at that time was Spring Gardens, a red-light zone.

By the 1850s, the area was already becoming a Chinese residential area. There were dockyards on Ship Street and McGregor Street for building and repairing ships. The edge of Sun Street, Moon Street and Star Street was the original site of the first power station in Hong Kong, operated by the Hongkong Electric Company, which began supplying power in 1890.

One of the first waterfront hospitals was the Seaman's Hospital, built in 1843, which was funded by the British merchant group Jardine's. It was then sold to the British Royal Navy in 1873 and subsequently redeveloped into the Royal Naval Hospital. After the Second World War, the hospital was revitalised as the Ruttonjee Hospital and became one of the main public hospitals in Hong Kong.

The district was home to several well-known schools. One of these schools was established by the famous traditional teacher, Mo Dunmei (莫敦梅). Started as a shushu (書塾) in 1919, the school was renamed Dunmei School in 1934 after him. It taught classical Chinese writings and Confucian ethics.

In 1936, the Chinese Methodist Church (香港基督教循道衛理教會) moved its building from Caine Road, Mid-levels Central, to Hennessy Road, Wanchai, a thoroughfare of the district running from west to east. This church building became the landmark of the district. In 1998, this building was demolished and replaced by a 23-storey building.

=== Second World War and the Sino-Japanese War (1937–1945) ===
During the Japanese occupation in the early 1940s, many bombardments took place in Wan Chai. There were abundant incidents of cannibalism, starvation, torture and abuses of the local population by the Japanese soldiers, including the illegal use of child labour. Senior residents could recall vividly how they survived the hardships: this oral history became an important, first-hand source of the harsh living conditions in Hong Kong under the Japanese period. The Dunmei school was closed during the Japanese occupation period. After the war, the school continued to provide Chinese education for children from families of higher income.

=== Post-war development (from 1945) ===
During the 1950s, the pro-Communist underground cell network Hailiushe (海流社) established their headquarters at the rooftop of a multi-story house on Spring Garden Lane. This group was successfully raided by the Hong Kong Police.

Prostitution had been one of the oldest occupations in Wan Chai. There are numerous historical accounts of women trading sexual services for western merchandise, especially with sailors from trading ships visiting this area. In the 1960s, Wan Chai became legendary for its exotic night life, especially for the US servicemen resting there during the War in Vietnam. Despite rapid changes of Wan Chai's demography due to reclamation and redevelopment, the presence of sex workers operating among ordinary residential areas has continued to be a distinctive feature. Some of the lifestyle was illustrated in past movies such as The World of Suzie Wong.

=== Transfer of sovereignty to China (PRC) ===
Wan Chai's Hong Kong Convention and Exhibition Centre has been home to major political and economic events. It was the site of the Hong Kong handover ceremony in 1997, in which the last governor of Hong Kong, Chris Patten, formally concluded the British chapter and transferred Hong Kong to China. The WTO Ministerial Conference in 2005 was also one of the largest international events hosted in Hong Kong, with delegates from 148 countries participating.

In May 2009, 300 guests and staff members at the Metropark Hotel in Wan Chai were quarantined, suspected of being infected or in contact with the H1N1 virus during the global outbreak of swine flu. A 25-year-old Mexican man who had stayed at the hotel was later found to have caught the viral infection. He had traveled to Hong Kong from Mexico via Shanghai.

=== Reclamation ===
The changes of Wan Chai's coastline from 1842 to 1997

Wan Chai's coastline has been extended outwards after a series of land reclamation schemes. Early in 1841, the coastline was located at Queen's Road East (the area of Spring Gardens and Ship Street). The first reclamation took place and new land was sold to Minister of Foreign Affairs of the British Colony. The project was privately funded and the government did not take part. Soon after, in 1858, the Minister and his salesmen sold the land back to the Chinese after Sir Robert Brown Black was named President of the Legislative Council of Hong Kong.

The next reclamation project in Wan Chai was the Praya East Reclamation Scheme. The coastline was extended to today's Gloucester Road. The reclamation after World War II from 1965 to 1972 pushed the coastline further out to the areas around Convention Avenue and the Wan Chai Pier. The 1990s Wan Chai Development project added additional land, on which the current HKCEC stands today.

== Community life ==
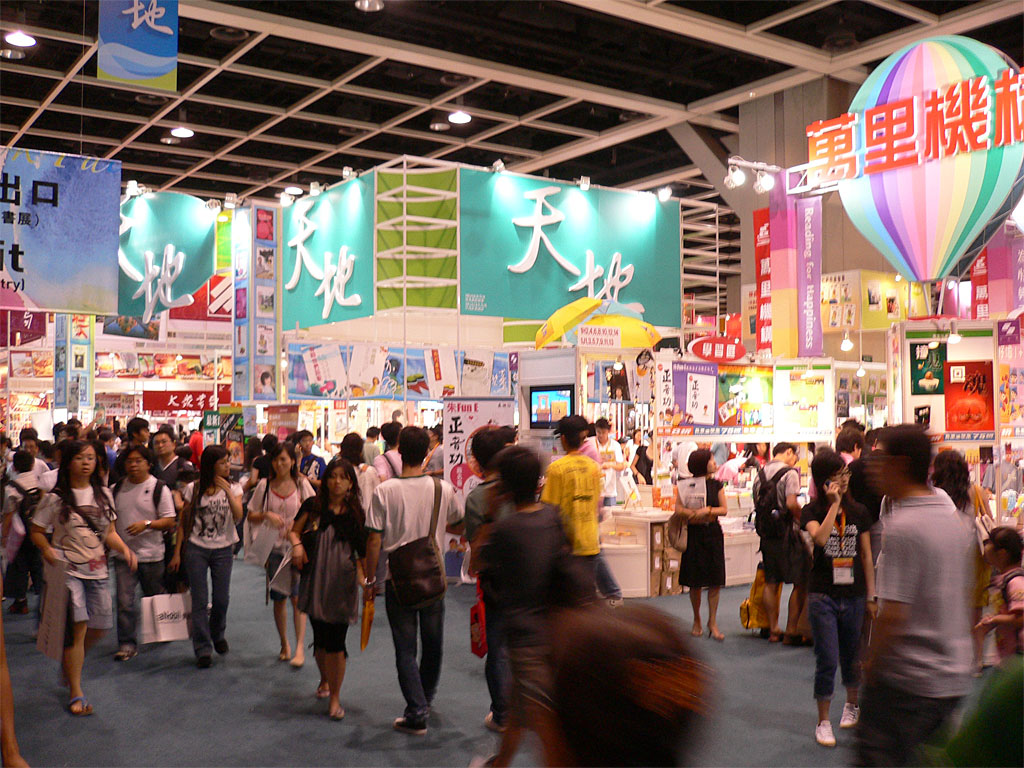
Book fair inside the Hong Kong Convention and Exhibition Centre

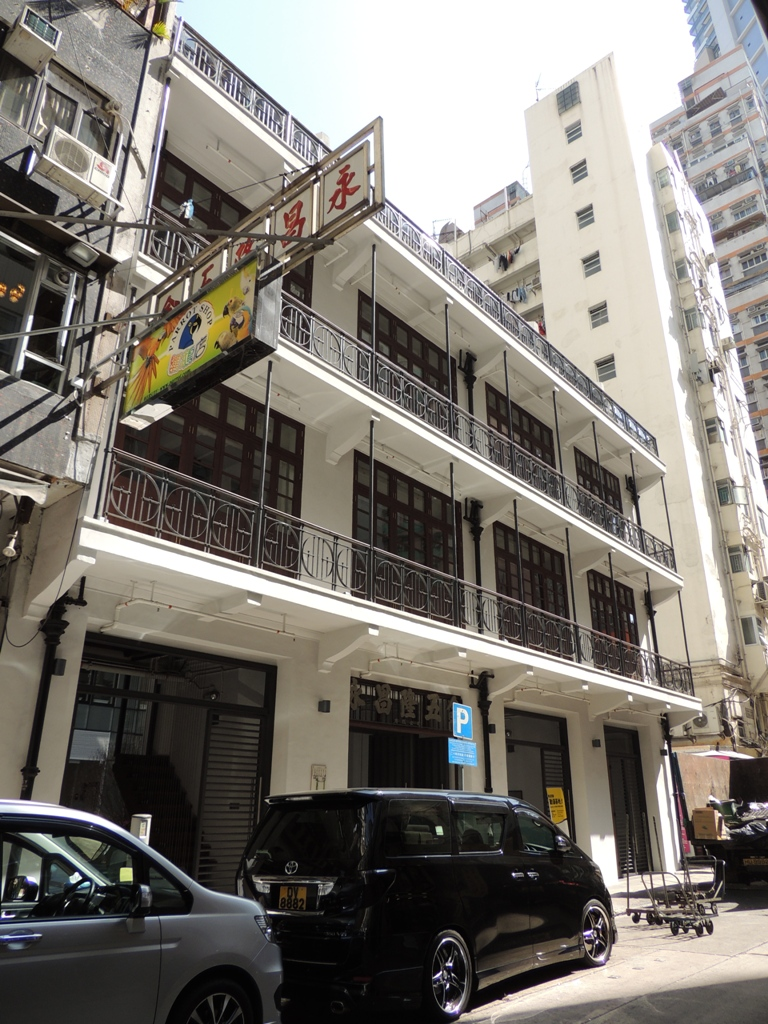
Comix Homebase

=== Arts and culture ===
Wan Chai is a major hub of foreign and Chinese cultural institutions in Hong Kong. It is home to the French Alliance Francaise, German Goethe-Institut and the British Council (until 2001). Near the waterfront, there are the Hong Kong Academy for Performing Arts and Hong Kong Arts Centre, two of the most popular venues for theatrical and cultural performances in Hong Kong. The Academy for Performing Arts is a higher education institution that trains musicians, performers, actors and dancers, as well as a public venue for drama, concerts, dance, and musicals productions. Every year the academy produces a number of Broadway musicals, including Singin' in the Rain, Saturday Night Fever, and Annie. The Arts Centre, just opposite to the academy, houses a studio theatre, art galleries, rehearsal rooms, the Goethe-Institut and a restaurant overlooking the Victoria Harbour.

The Hong Kong Convention and Exhibition Centre (HKCEC), a HK$4.8 billion convention centre with an extension completed in 1997, covers over 16 acres (65,000 m^{2}) of newly reclaimed land that added an extra 38,000 m^{2} of functional space to the existing convention centre. It remains a venue for international trade fairs, some of which are among the biggest in the world: the annual Hong Kong Book Fair in July, food fair and festival, technology exhibitions, anime conventions and cosplay competitions.

=== Dining ===
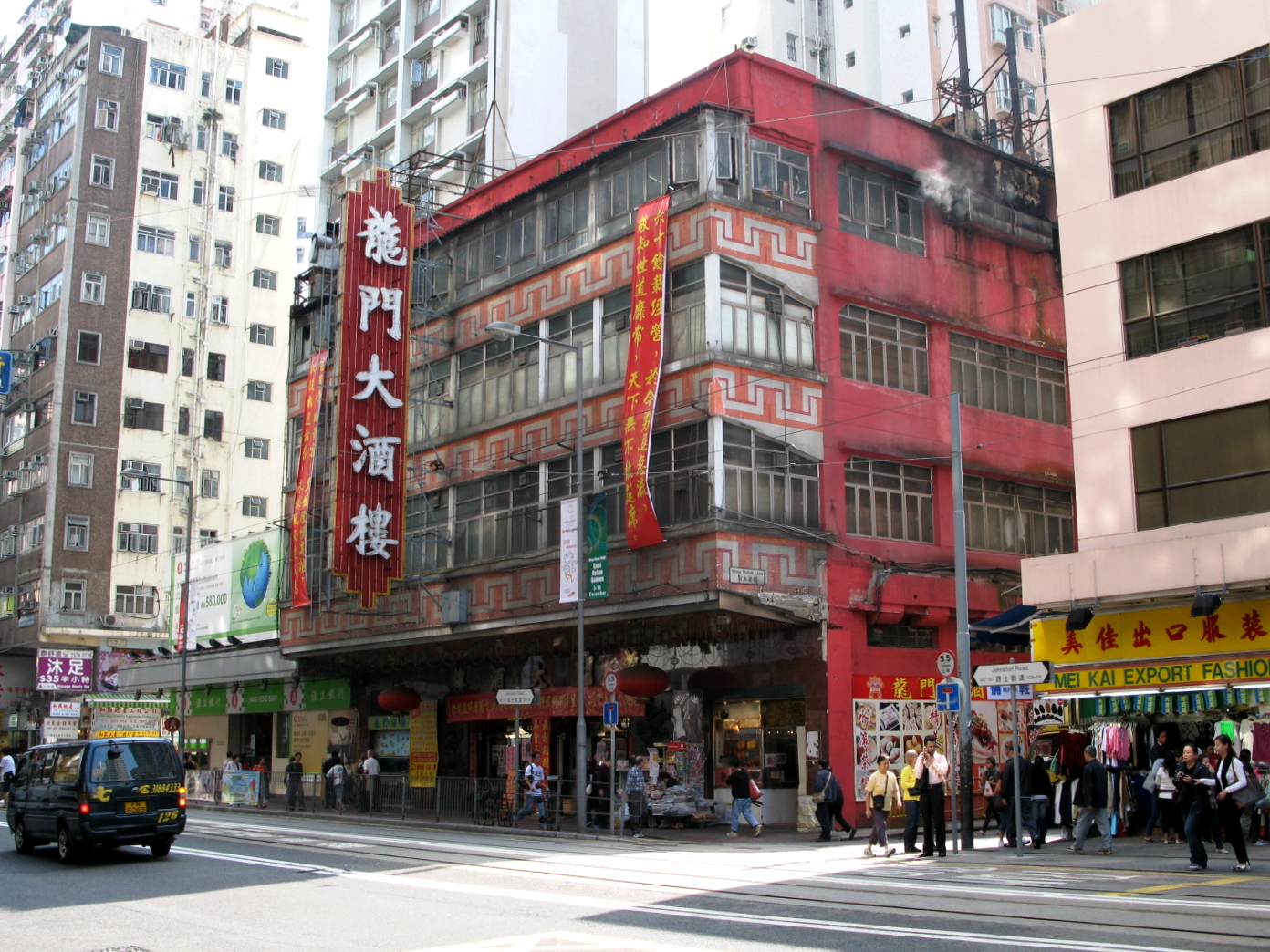
Lung Mun, an old-styled Cantonese restaurant

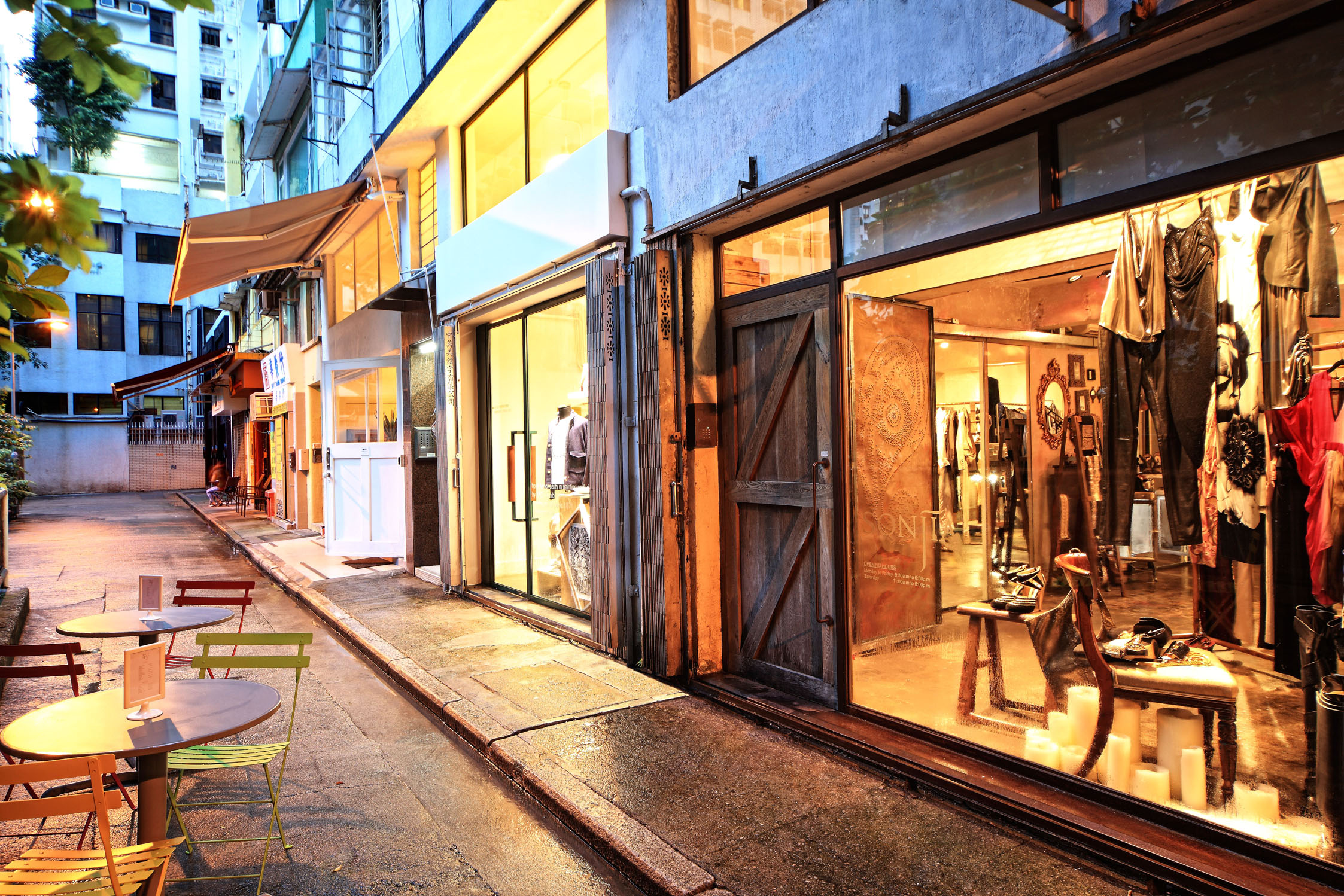
Shops in Sun Street

- Cha chaan teng are local-styled fast-food restaurants, and Chinese pastry. Many of the restaurants can be found all along Jaffe Road. Numerous tea shops offer cheap Chinese herbal tea, like leong cha (lit. cool tea) and 24-mei.
- Dai pai dong, open-air restaurants in a big tent, is another classic restaurant type that appeared in Wan Chai. Despite the often unclean and uncomfortable eating conditions, many people are attracted to the freshly made steamed rice roll, congee and chow mein early in the morning. Due to urban renewal projects in recent years, most of these restaurants are fading away.
- Yum cha, is the name associated with having dim sum, e.g. Fook Lam Moon restaurant. People usually have "one bowl with two pieces" (一盅兩件, meaning a cup of tea with two dim sums) for breakfast. There were three old-styled dims restaurants remaining in Wan Chai, namely Lung Mun, Lung To, and Lung Tuen. Lung Mun, the last of the trio, closed on 30 November 2009. A number of Buddhist cuisine restaurants are also available in the area.
- The 1980s also saw an expansion of Western-cuisine restaurants in Wan Chai. Nowadays, Japanese, Korean, Vietnamese, Thai and Indian restaurants are all very common. There are also many fast food restaurants serving Cantonese and other Chinese dishes, including the franchised Maxim's and Café de Coral. Jaffe Road and Lockhart Road are famous for pubs.

=== Bar district ===
The area towards the western end of Lockhart Road, including a small part of the parallel Jaffe Road, is one of Hong Kong island's two main bar districts (the other being the more upmarket Lan Kwai Fong in Central). Once considered primarily as a red light district, this area is now more diverse with bars, pubs, restaurants and discos. A number of the raunchier bars still remain; however, their doorways festooned with women from Thailand and the Philippines. The famous novel and film The World of Suzie Wong sets many scenes in this area. The bar district has been popular with visiting sailors and navies, when Fenwick Pier, west of the Hong Kong Convention and Exhibition Centre, was in use as a military pier.

=== Recreational activities ===
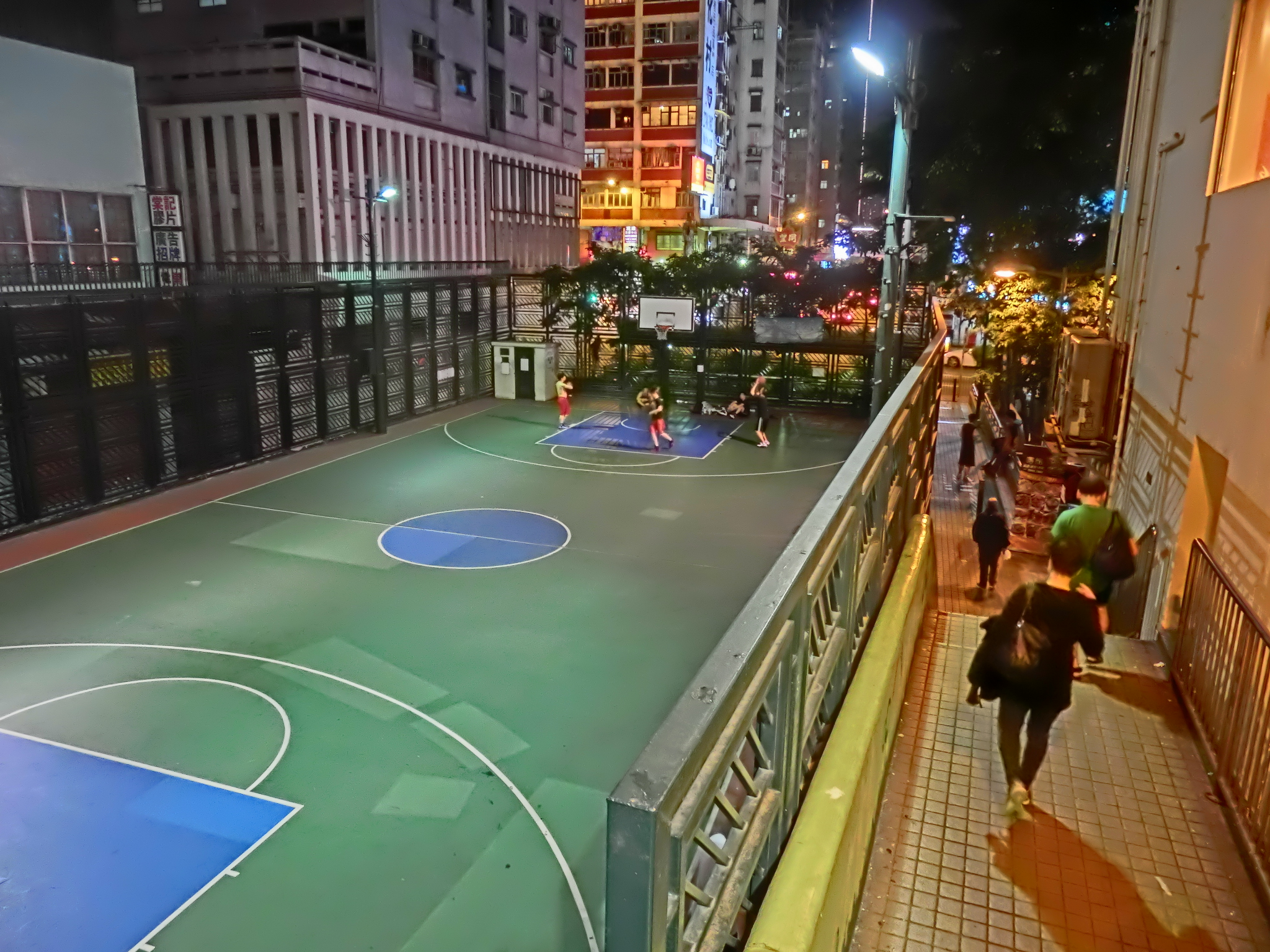
Basketball court near Wan Chai Road

Southorn Playground on Johnston Road (the tram line) is a meeting place for the locals in Wan Chai, particularly the senior residents. During the prime years of the British colonial administration, coolie workers would convene at the playground in the morning to await employment opportunities. In the evening, the playground became an open-air pitch where people sold food, performed magic and kung fu.

Some of those trademark activities still exist through today: senior citizens socialise and play Chinese chess, young people at school play football and basketball, ad-hoc street basketball games that attract flocks of spectators and players. Occasionally, the entire playground is used for carnival fairs, three-player drill basketball contests and hip hop dance competitions.

=== Religious diversity ===
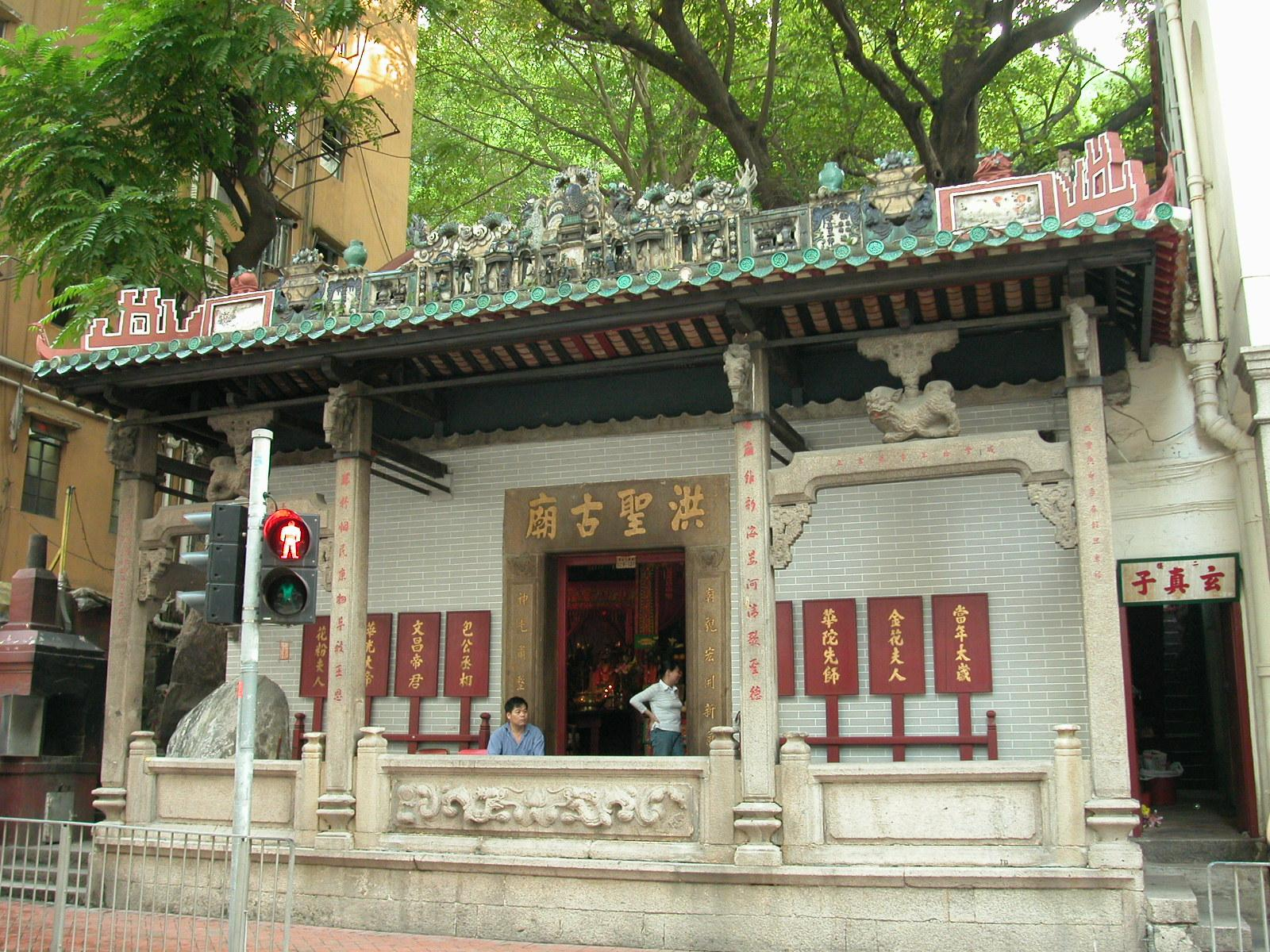
Hung Shing Temple

Wan Chai's places of worship represent Buddhism, Taoism, Catholicism, Protestantism, Christianity, Mormonism, Sikhism, and Islam. Despite the wide variety, many religious structures are located in close proximity to each other. Hung Shing Temple, for example, is a typically Taoist temple. Inside, there are Buddhist Kwun Yum chapels next to the main altar. People coming to worship Hung Shing Ye could also burn joss sticks to Kwun Yum as well. Villain hitting is another blended ceremony, combining in different proportions Confucianism, Taoism, and folk religion. Some old female "psychics" perform this ancient ceremony under the Canal Road Flyover in particular days of a lunar month. The Wan Chai Khalsa Diwan Sikh Temple is the biggest Sikh temple in Hong Kong. The Asia Area Office of the Church of Jesus Christ of Latter-day Saints, along with chapels where multiple congregations meet throughout the week, is on Gloucester Road.

== Tourism and landmarks ==
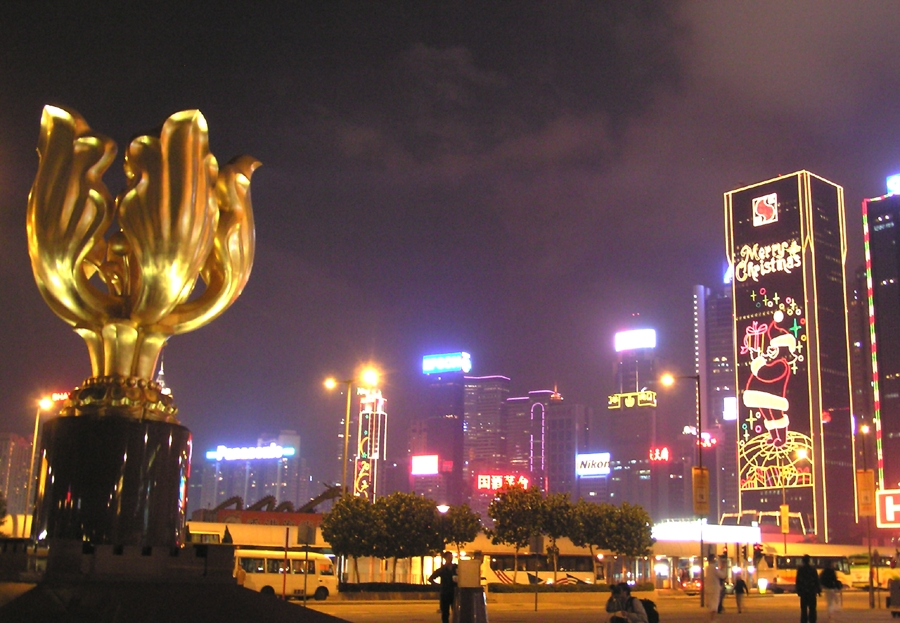
The Golden Bauhinia Square at night

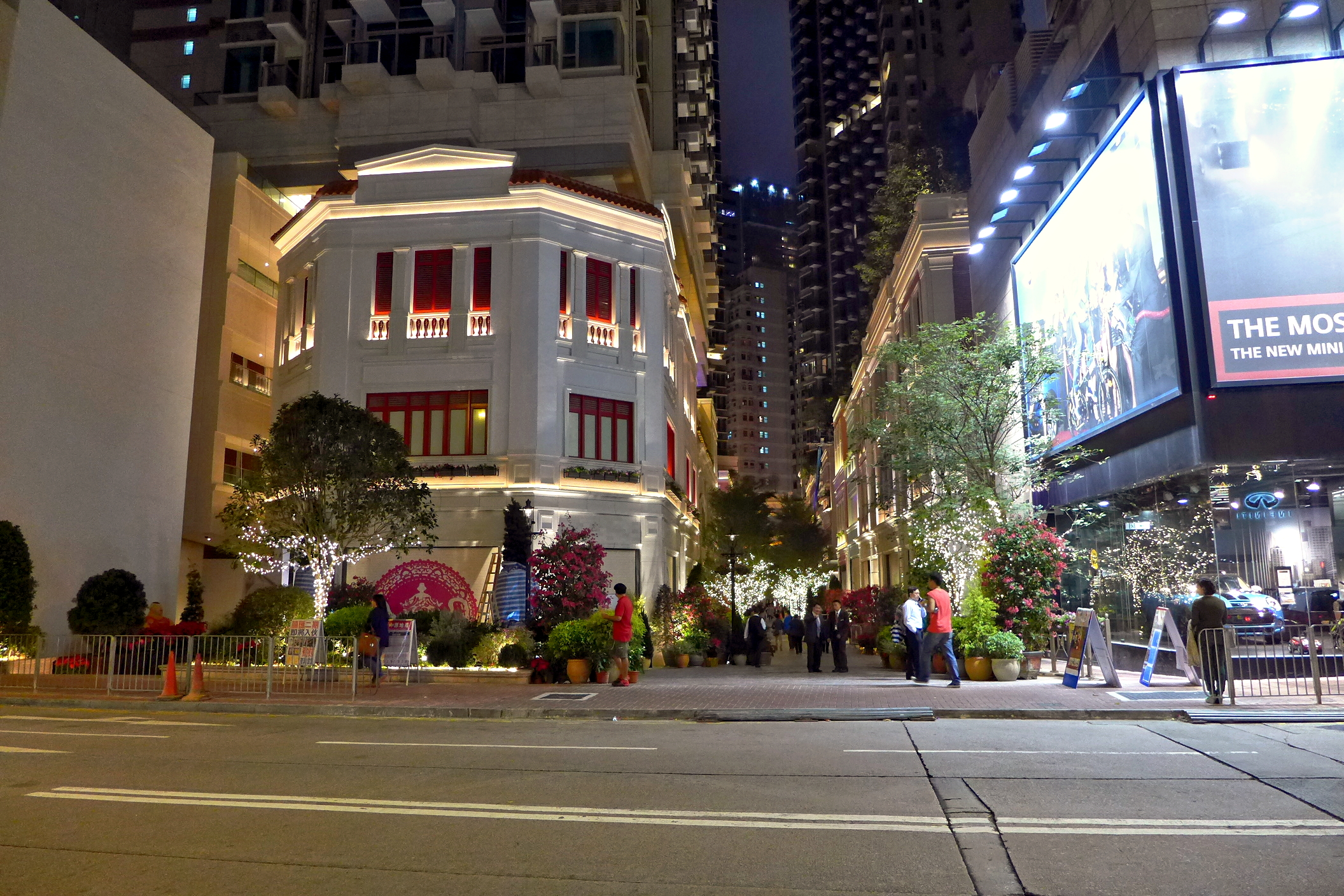
Lee Tung Avenue

Wan Chai offers historical conservation sites including Old Wan Chai Post Office, Hung Shing Temple and Pak Tai Temple. Many of the medium-sized shopping centres are named in numerals, such as Oriental 188, 328, and 298 Computer Centre. These numbers might have come from the earlier days when all prostitution houses were numbered, as they were referred to as "big numbers" (大冧巴, dai lum bah).

There are many commercial complexes and office skyscrapers in Wan Chai. The HK$4.4 billion 78-storey skyscraper Central Plaza currently stands as the third tallest building in Hong Kong. Small but free art exhibitions used to be held on the second floor all year round, whereas the first floor connects Wan Chai's footbridge network: the Hong Kong Exhibition and Convention Centre at the network's extreme north, Wan Chai Pier, China Building, Harbour Centre, Central Plaza, Immigration Department Tower, Wan Chai Court, Wan Chai MTR station and Johnston Road (the tram line) at the network's extreme south.

More recent tourist attractions include the Golden Bauhinia Square, the site of a daily flag-rising ceremony. This ceremony is enhanced on 1 July (Handover of Hong Kong) and 1 October (National Day of China).

A 3-storey pergola exhibition is built opposite to Li Chit Garden. Tai Fat Hau footbridge also holds an art display of the fingerprints of 30,000 citizens slated for the Guinness Book of World Records. The sticker pictures on 50 poles of the bridge have been colloquially called the "50 landscapes of Wan Chai" (灣仔五十景).

Lovers' Rock reclines on the hillside of Bowen Road near Shiu Fai Terrace, mid-levels Wan Chai. The rock received its name since it resembles a small, thin column sticking out of the rock base. This special-looking rock is said to have granted happy marriages to its devoted worshippers. Many people are attracted by its reputation.

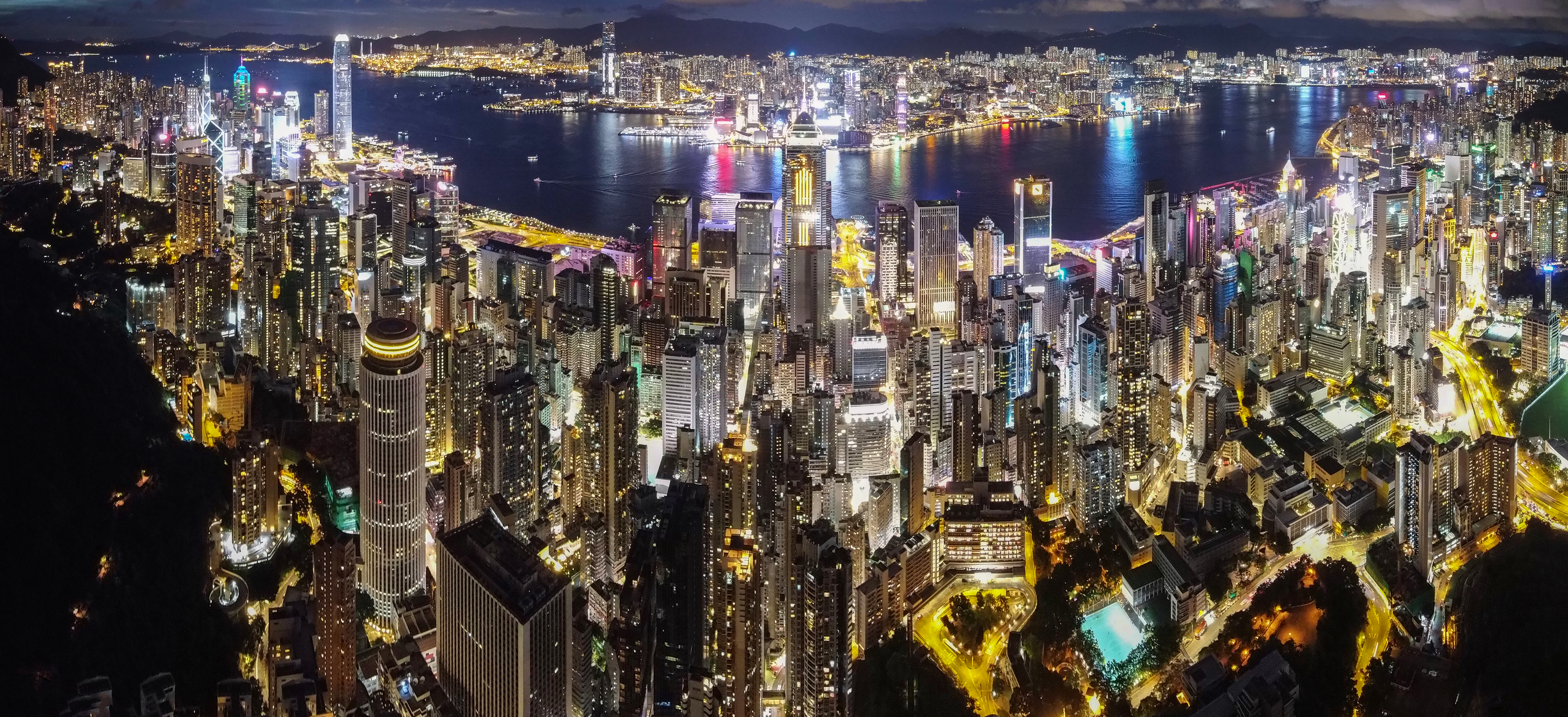
View of Wan Chai at night from Stubbs Road, also showing Central Plaza on the right

== Buildings and constructions ==
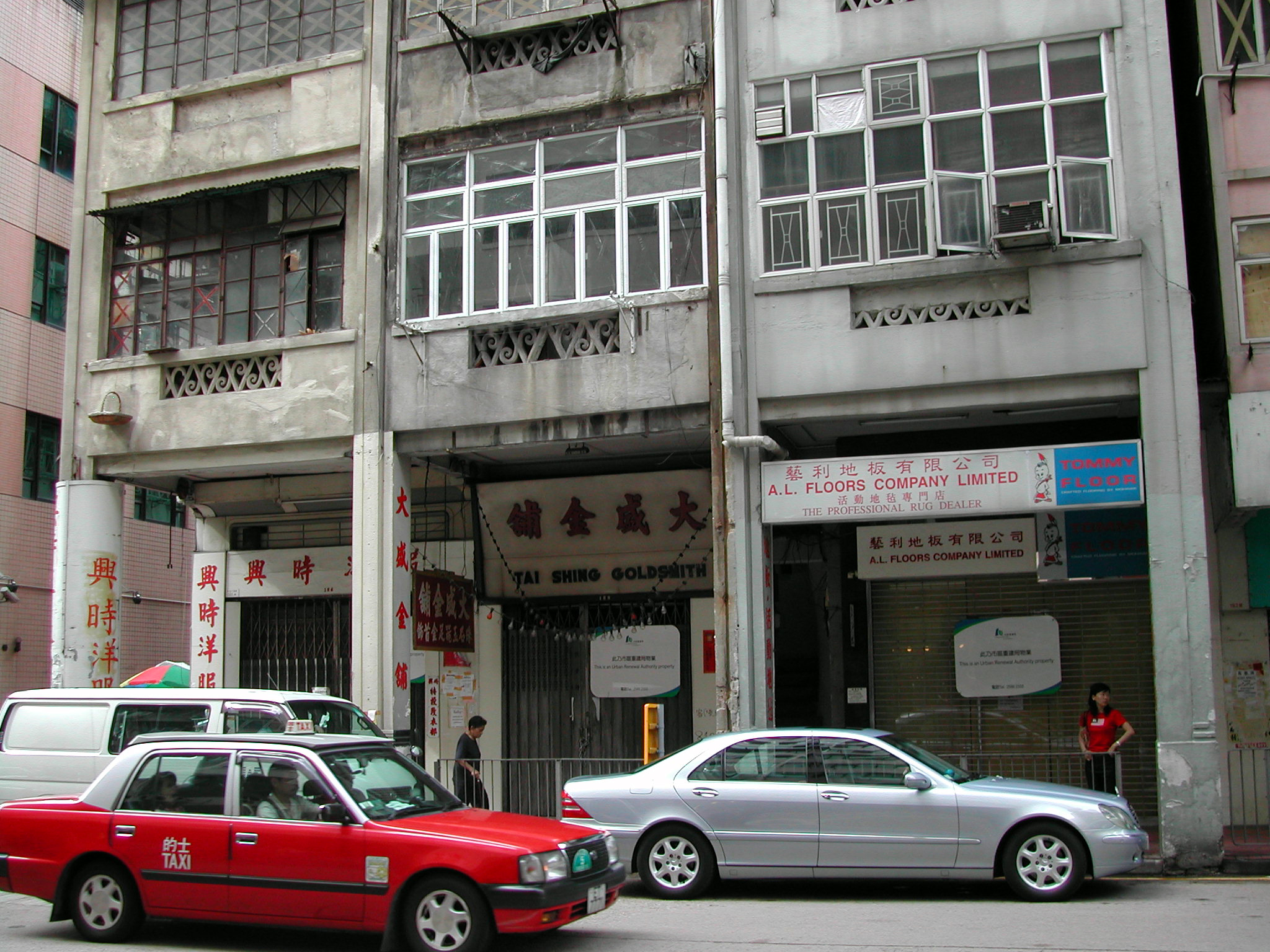
Old-fashioned shops (tong-lau) in Wan Chai are typical examples of Lingnan architecture, comparable to those found in Guangzhou and Taipei. Attached to the second story from the pavement, numerous pillars were built in front of the closed stores.

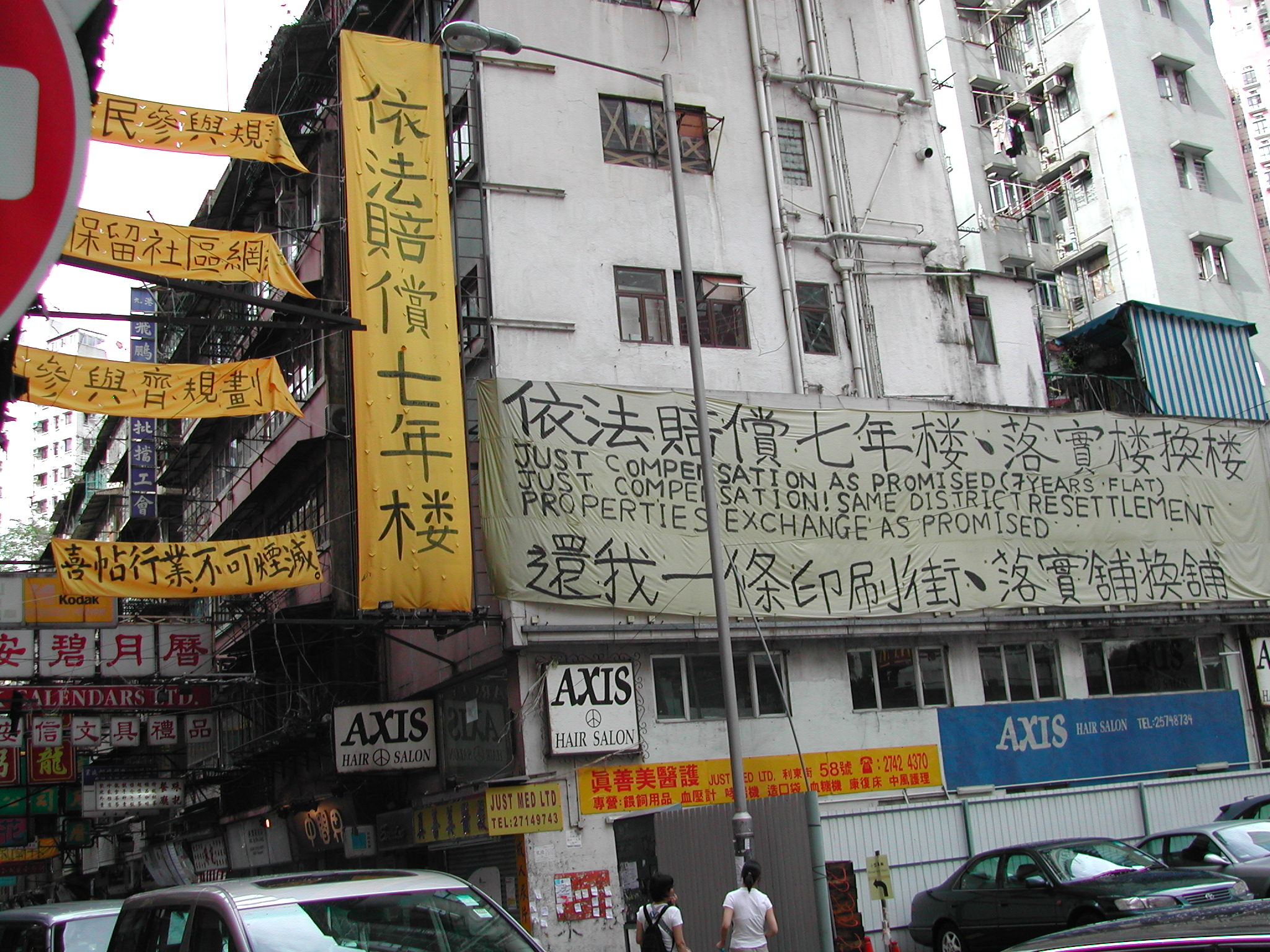
Banners brandished all over Lee Tung Street against the demolishing action of the government in 2005

=== Architecture ===
Throughout Wan Chai's history, construction styles have changed according to the architectural movement at the time.

Era	Style	Examples
Qing Dynasty	Chinese-style	Hung Shing Temple
1910s–1920s	Neoclassical architecture	Old Wan Chai Post Office; Blue House
1930s	Streamline Moderne architecture	Wan Chai Market
Post-WWII	Bauhaus-style	Shop houses (tong-lau) on Lee Tung Street, Tai Yuen Street; Caltex House

In the 1950s and 1960s, an increasing number of girlie bars and nightclubs were opened in the red-light district by Jaffe and Lockhart Road. The establishments entertained visiting sailors landing at Fenwick Pier. Beyond Gloucester Road is the commercial area developed in the late 1970s and 1980s, a time at which Hong Kong underwent economic development at full speed. At the same time, buildings like the Hong Kong Academy for Performing Arts, HKCEC, and Central Plaza were constructed on the newly reclaimed land.

Skyscrapers in Wan Chai include:

- Central Plaza, 78 floors, offices, completed in 1992
- Hopewell Centre, 64 floors, offices, completed in 1980
- Sun Hung Kai Centre, 56 floors, offices, completed in 1981
- May House, 47 floors, government offices, completed in 2004. Headquarters of the Hong Kong Police Force
- China Online Centre, 52 floors, offices, completed in 2000
- Three Pacific Place, 40 floors, offices, completed in 2004
- Convention Plaza Office Tower, 50 floors, offices, completed in 1990
- Immigration Tower, 49 floors, government offices, completed in 1990
- Revenue Tower, 49 floors, government offices, completed in 1990
- Wanchai Tower, 44 floors, government offices, completed in 1985
- MLC Tower, 40 floors, offices, completed in 1998
- Wu Chung House, 40 floors, offices and government offices, completed in 1992
- Great Eagle Centre, 35 floors, offices, completed in 1983
- Shui On Centre, 35 floors, offices, completed in 1987
- QRE Plaza, 35 floors, offices and shops, completed in 2007
- China Resources Building, 48 floors, offices, completed in 1983
- Harbour Centre, 33 floors, offices, completed in 1983

=== Urban decay and renewal ===
Many of Wan Chai's older buildings now face a serious problem of urban decay. To tackle the problem, the government has launched a series of urban renewal projects to bring new life into the area. Many local residents have relocation worries such as whether the Urban Renewal Authority can compensate enough to put them in a new space of equal size. Other concerns involve the loss of building character that make up part of that Hong Kong cultural identity.

- Demolition of Lee Tung St – Old buildings on Lee Tung Street are scheduled for demolition. Many businesses have shut down or moved out. Today, most stores have signs on their gate proclaiming "This is an Urban Renewal Authority Property".
- Renovation of Tai Yuen St – Visitors may gain a distinctive experience of bustling local street-stall shopping in Tai Yuen Street. Many huckster stalls sell a wide variety of dried goods, garments, household products, dumplings, and Chinese herbal medicine. This predominantly tourist attraction area is a place where old houses and modern mansions mingle, creating an interesting disparity.

=== Central and Wan Chai reclamation (from 2007) ===
After the completion of the Central and Wan Chai Reclamation Feasibility Study in 1989, the Land Development Policy Committee endorsed the idea of an ongoing series of reclamation. The reclamation comprises three discrete development areas to be aligned by public parks, namely, Central, Tamar and Exhibition. The urban development of each cell would be further divided into five subsequent phases. As of 2014, reclamation for the Central area has been completed: the area is largely taken by the new government offices and the Legislative Council of Hong Kong (its old building in the heart of Central has been reverted to its original use as the Supreme Court).

== Government ==
The Hong Kong Immigration Department has its headquarters at the Immigration Tower in Wan Chai. The Hong Kong Police Force operates from the Wan Chai District; their headquarters is located at the Wan Chai Police District Headquarters, 1 Arsenal Street. within the Hong Kong Police Headquarters Compound. Maggie Farley of the Los Angeles Times said in 1996, referring to the then Wan Chai Police Station, that the police headquarters was "a stolid, whitewashed building with square pillars and breezy verandas".

== Economy ==
Firms and companies headquartered in Wan Chai or with regional offices there include:

- AIA Group
- BNY Mellon
- Beijing Enterprises
- China Everbright Group
- China Jinmao
- China Life Insurance Company
- China Merchants Capital
- China Overseas Land and Investment
- China Resources
- China State Construction International
- China Telecom
- Dah Sing Bank
- Emperor Group
- Great Eagle Holdings
- Hopewell Holdings
- Langham Hospitality Group
- Oliver Wyman
- PAG (investment firm)
- PetroChina
- Shanghai Industrial Holdings
- Shanghai Pudong Development Bank
- Sinochem
- Sinopec
- Société Générale
- Sun Hung Kai Properties
- Tencent Holdings
- Wells Fargo

Chamber of Commerce

- British Chamber of Commerce in Hong Kong
- Singapore Chamber of Commerce (Hong Kong)

Esquel Group has its head office in Harbour Centre (海港中心), Wan Chai.

Jademan (now Culturecom) was formerly headquartered in Harbour Centre.

== Transportation ==
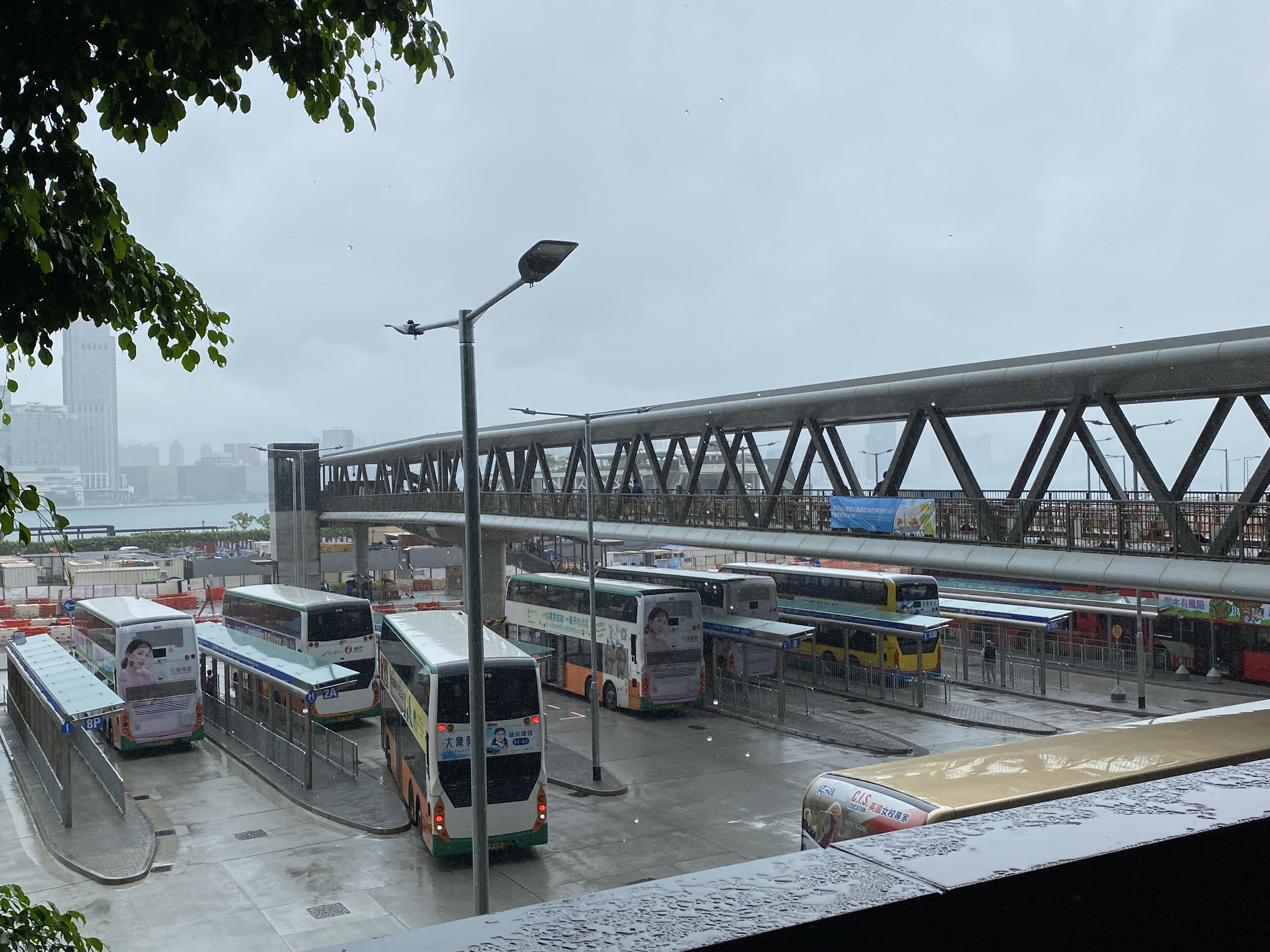
Exhibition Centre Station Public Transport Interchange

Geographically, Wan Chai is the crossing point between the Central and Western District (West Point/Central), and the Eastern (Causeway Bay/North Point) district. Its thoroughfares connect the main developed areas along the northern coast of Hong Kong Island. The transport infrastructure is efficient, convenient and highly accessible.

- Mass Transit Railway (MTR)
  - Wan Chai station on the Island line, trains run between Kennedy Town and Chai Wan (north-eastern part of Hong Kong Island)
  - Exhibition Centre station on the East Rail line, trains run between Admiralty and Lo Wu/Lok Ma Chau border crossings
- Trams run between Kennedy Town and Shau Kei Wan (north-eastern part of Hong Kong Island)
- Buses travel along thoroughfares such as Gloucester Road and Hennessy Road, with destinations as different parts of Hong Kong
- Ferry services from Wan Chai Pier to Tsim Sha Tsui in Kowloon, across the Victoria Harbour

=== Ferries ===
The Star Ferry at Wan Chai Pier is the sole ferry operator in the area. Frequent services cross the Victoria Harbour from HKCEC, Wan Chai to the Cultural Centre in Tsim Sha Tsui. In light of more convenient and competitive cross-harbour public transportation, the Star Ferry continues to provide an inexpensive option to local commuters. Numerous shipping companies, such as the Anglo-Eastern Group, also have their headquarters in Wan Chai.

=== Main roads and tunnels ===
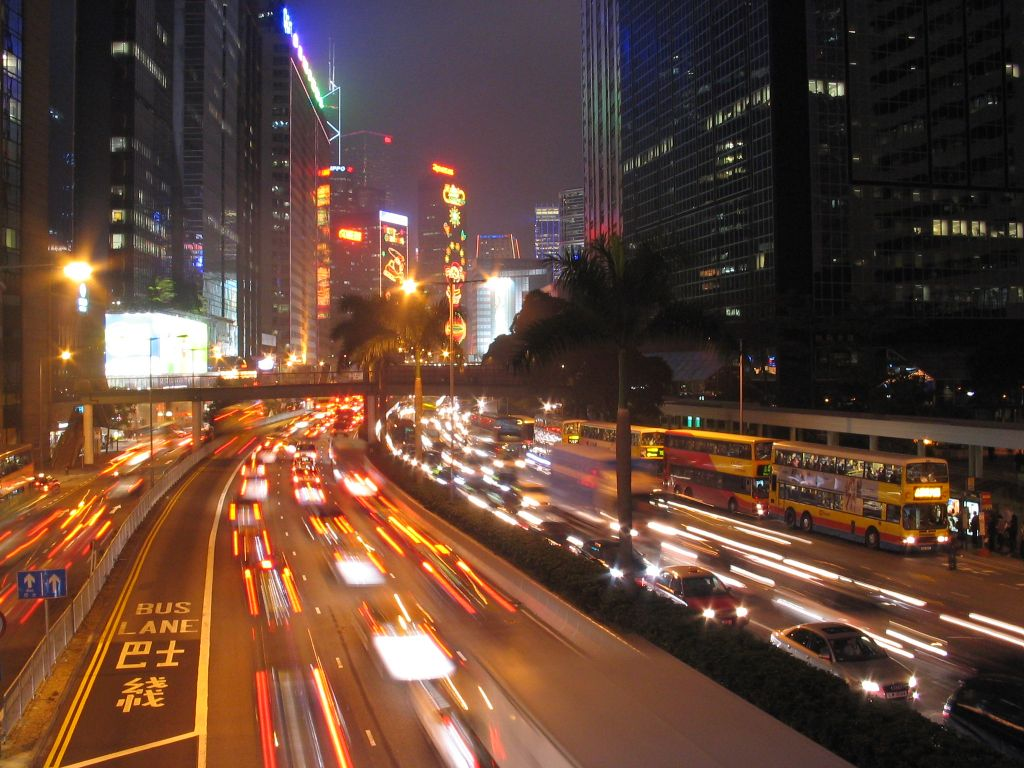
Gloucester Road in Wan Chai

Wan Chai's Gloucester Road, an east–west trunk route along the northern coast, is connected to Cross-Harbour Tunnel, the first undersea tunnel in Hong Kong. This tunnel is connected to the south by a direct viaduct from its landing point on Hong Kong Island to the Aberdeen Tunnel towards the southern coast. Connecting Hong Kong Island at Kellett Island (the site of the Royal Navy Club) to a reclaimed site at Hung Hom Bay in Kowloon, this tunnel provides a direct link by road. Prior to the tunnel's opening in 1972, local drivers and pedestrians depended solely upon the Star Ferry services to cross the Victoria Harbour. Linking the main financial districts on both sides of Victoria Harbour, the tunnel carries 123,000 vehicles daily. On the other hand, the thoroughfare Queen's Road East, an extension from Queen's Road West at Kennedy Town, through Queen's Road Central at Central, Queensway at Admiralty, takes a southerly route to provide an alternative east–west road link. Due to Wan Chai's early involvement in the British colonial administration, road names were often taken from previous Governors, such as Hennessy Road, and notable people (Gloucester Road, Jaffe Road, Lockhart Road, Johnston Road, Fleming Road, Luard Road, O'Brien Road, Marsh Road, Stewart Road, McGregor Street, etc.).

Thoroughfares, Roads and Streets:

- Amoy Street
- Anton Street
- Arsenal Street
- Convention Avenue
- Cross Lane
- Cross Street
- Electric Street
- Expo Drive
- Expo Drive Central
- Expo Drive East
- Fenwick Pier Street
- Fenwick Street
- Fleming Road
- Gresson Street
- Harbour Road
- Hennessy Road
- Hill Side Terrace
- Jaffe Road
- Johnston Road
- Landale Street
- Lockhart Road
- Lee Tung Avenue
- Luard Road
- Lun Fat Street
- Marsh Road
- Monmouth Path
- Moon Street, Starstreet Precinct
- O'Brien Road
- Performing Arts Avenue
- Queen's Road East
- Salvation Army Street
- Schooner Street
- Ship Street
- Spring Garden Lane
- St. Francis Street
- St. Francis Yard
- Star Street, Starstreet Precinct
- Stewart Road
- Stone Nullah Lane
- Sun Street, Starstreet Precinct
- Swatow Street
- Tai Wo Street
- Tai Wong Street East
- Tai Wong Street West
- Tai Yuen Street
- Thomson Road
- Tonnochy Road
- Triangle Street
- Wan Chai Road
- Wood Road

=== Mass Transit Railway ===
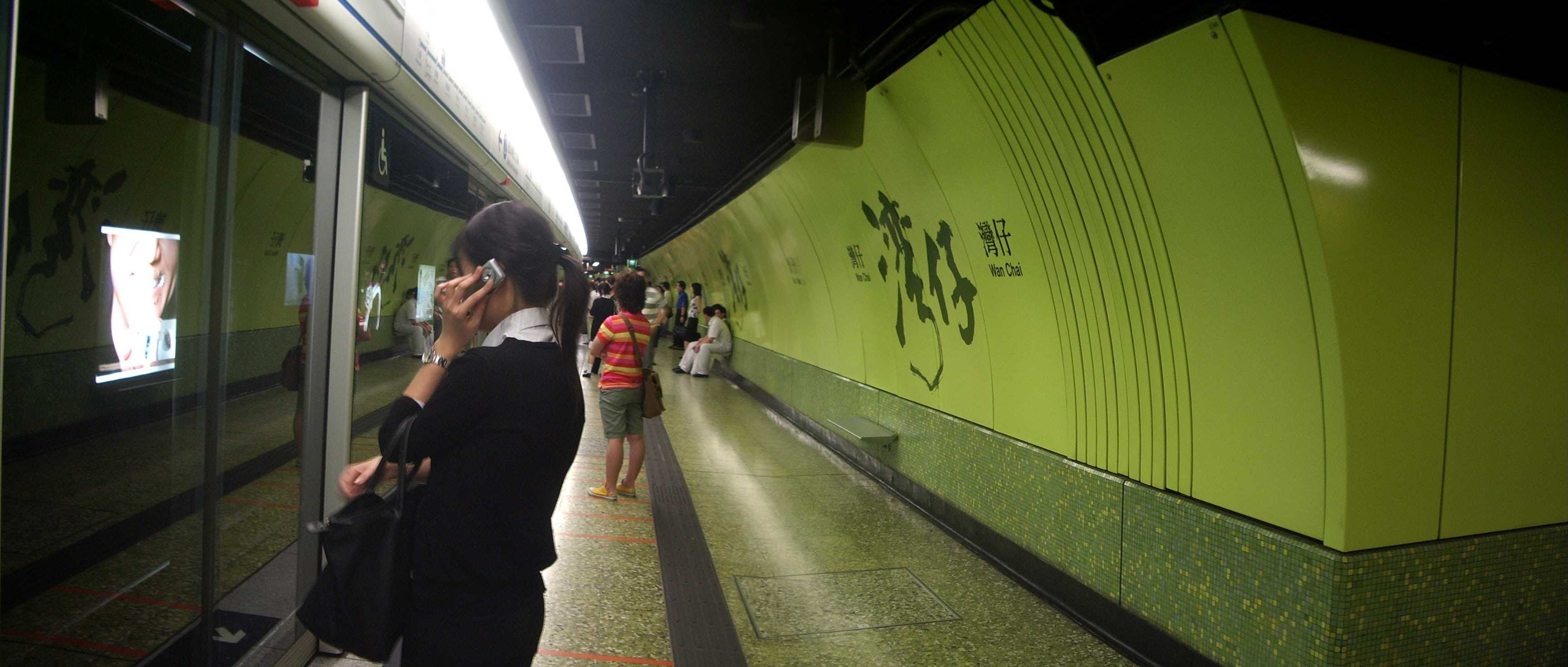
Wan Chai MTR station

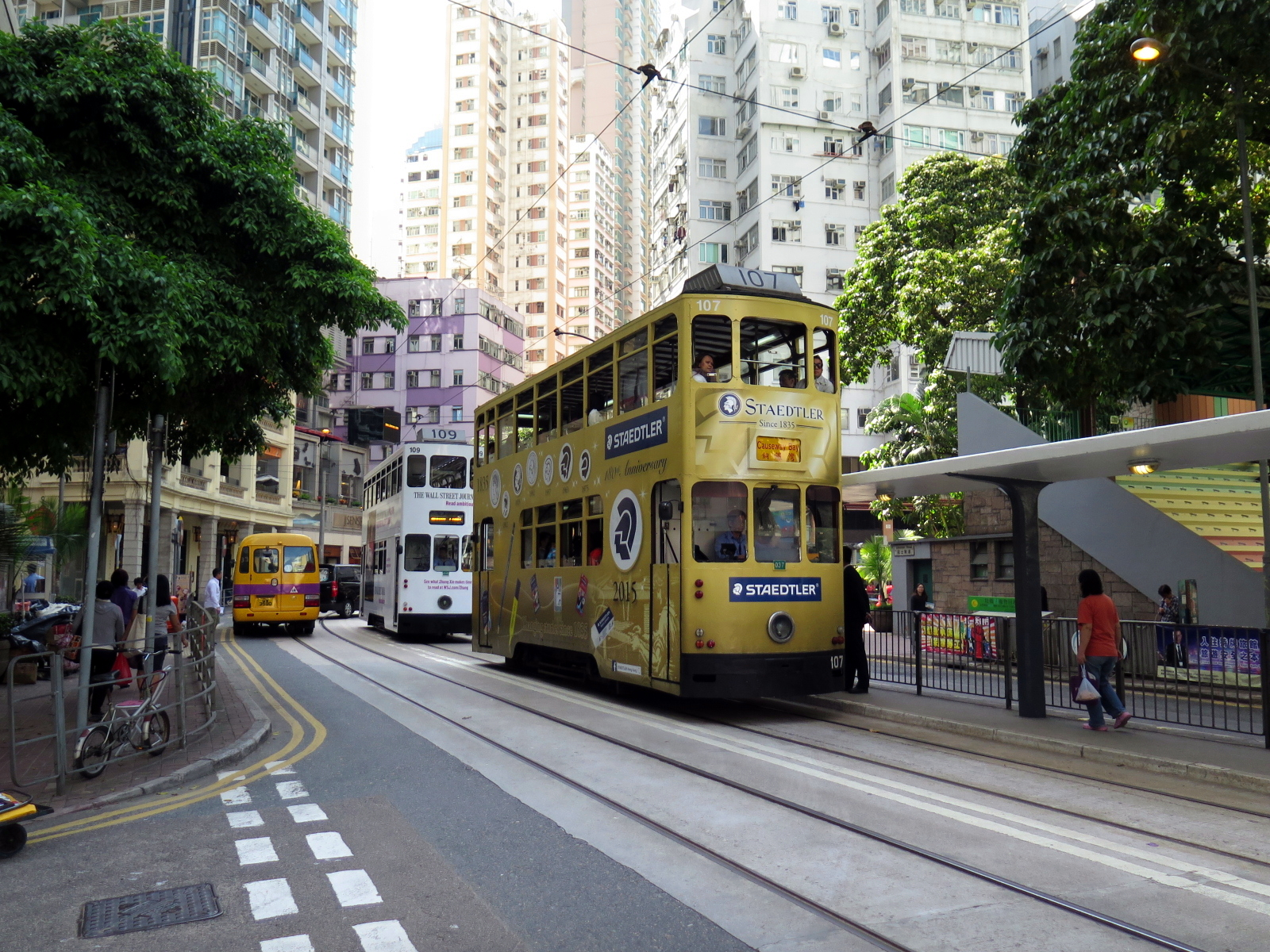
Trams in Johnston Road

- Island line – Wan Chai

The MTR Island line runs beneath Hennessy Road, a thoroughfare, in the locality. Due to the large size of Wan Chai, more than 50 entry/exit gates and 8 entrances/exits are set up. An extension project was carried out in the early 2000s; it created two additional entrances/exits, one of which connects to the footbridge network from the Hong Kong Exhibition and Convention Centre to the station. Then this footbridge is also interconnected with covered corridor of buildings along the Victoria Harbour, and ends up at Wan Chai Pier.

- East Rail line - Exhibition Centre

The East Rail line was extended from Hung Hom to Admiralty in 2022 as part of the Shatin to Central Link project, with a newly built station near the Hong Kong Exhibition and Convention Centre. Its exits connect to the footbridge network in Wan Chai North which also leads back to Wan Chai station.

=== Trams ===
Tram services run between Shau Kei Wan on the northeastern part of the island and Kennedy Town on the west, with a circular branch serving Happy Valley and the Happy Valley Racecourse. The tram route runs across Johnston Road and Hennessy Road.

=== Buses ===
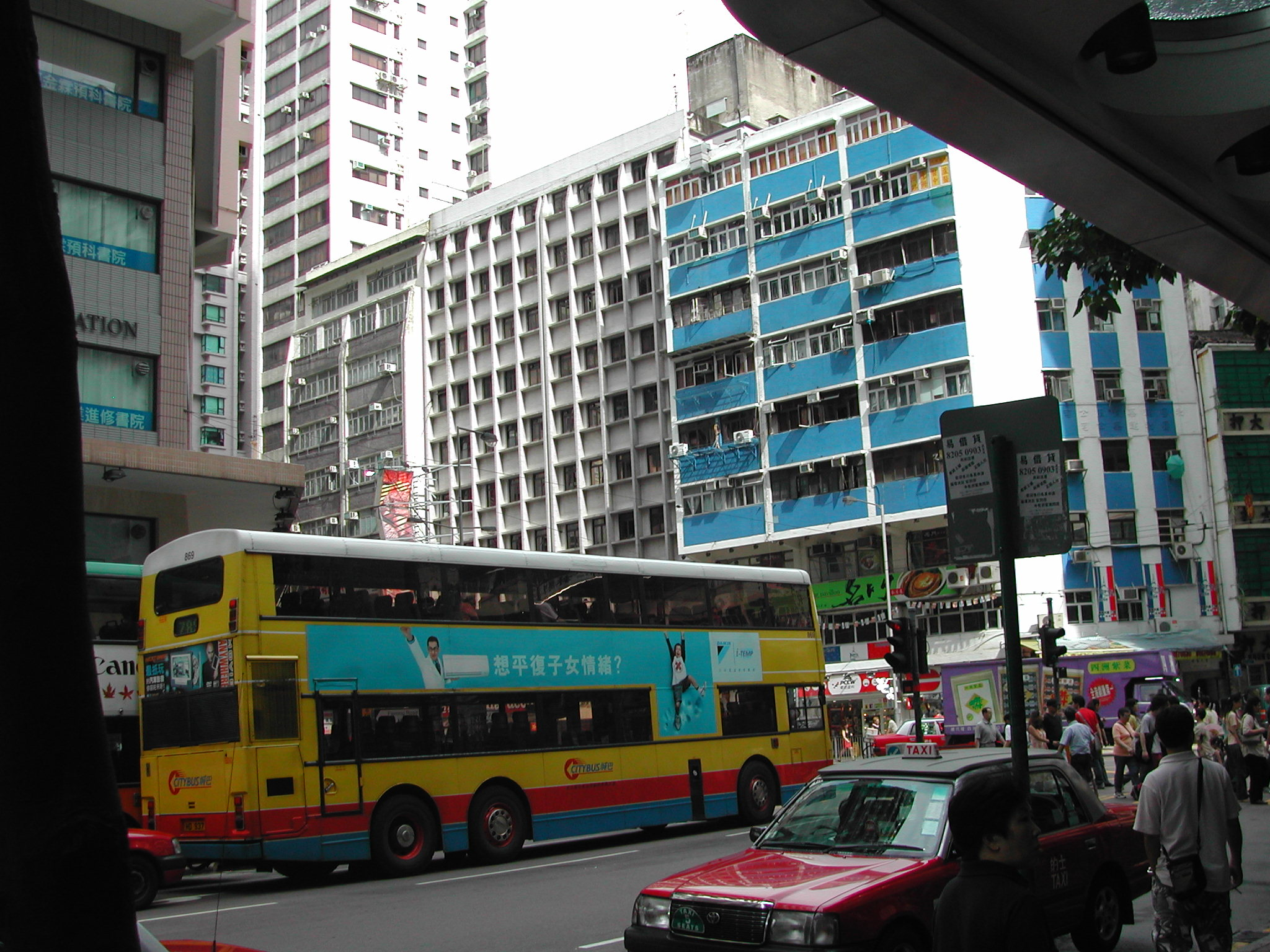
Fleming Road in Wan Chai, filled with buses and taxis.

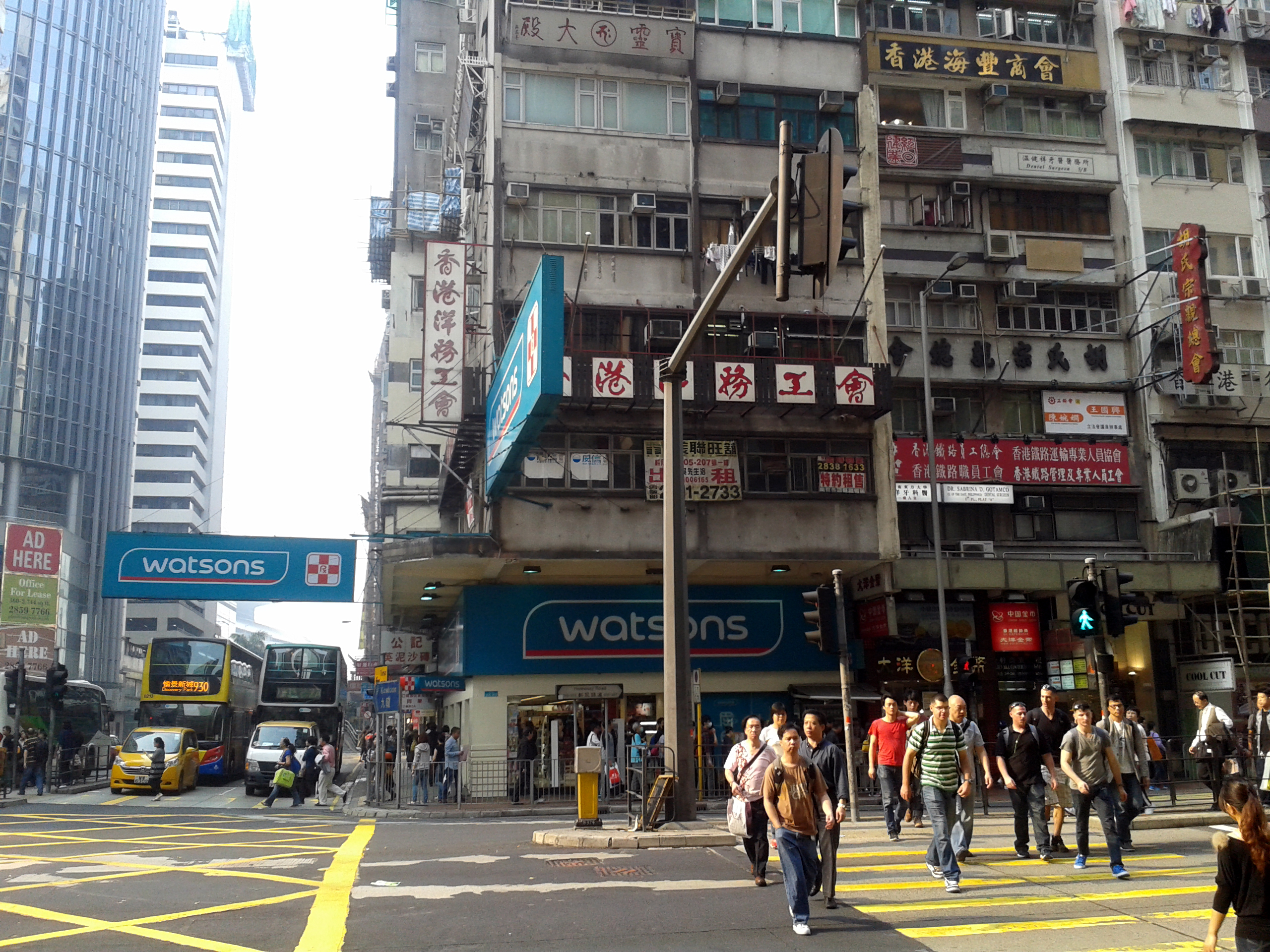
Pedestrian crossing busy streets in Wan Chai (Fleming Road and Hennessy Road junction).

Most buses travel in Wan Chai from Admiralty to Causeway Bay via Hennessy Road or, in the opposite direction, Johnston Road and Gloucester Road.

=== Taxis ===
Red taxi (urban) services are available to hire in Wan Chai. These can be pre-booked by telephone; however, hailing on the street is a more common way of getting a taxicab. Vehicles that carry a green plate at the front of their cars are able to carry passengers across the Victoria Harbour to Kowloon. There are, however, areas with restricted kerbs and designated pick-up and drop-off points in the area.

=== Minibus ===
There are two types of minibuses in Wan Chai, the green minibus and the red minibus. In general, green minibuses operate on scheduled service with fixed routes and published fares. Red minibuses run with government licence but on non-scheduled services, casually connecting regular travellers and commuters to specific urban areas across Hong Kong Island. Drivers of red minibuses will display fares in the front of their minibus windshields.

- Routes:
  - Green: 4A, 4B, 4C, 5, 6, 7, 9, 11, 14M, 21A, 21M, 24A, 24M, 25, 28, 30, 31, 35M, 36X, 39M, 40, 56, 69
  - Red:
    - West Point – Causeway Bay (Sogo) / Shau Kei Wan
    - Tsuen Wan – Wan Chai – Causeway Bay. The return to Tsuen Wan stop is in front of Wan Chai Computer Centre.
    - Sheung Shui – Wan Chai
    - Yuen Long – Wan Chai

== Education ==
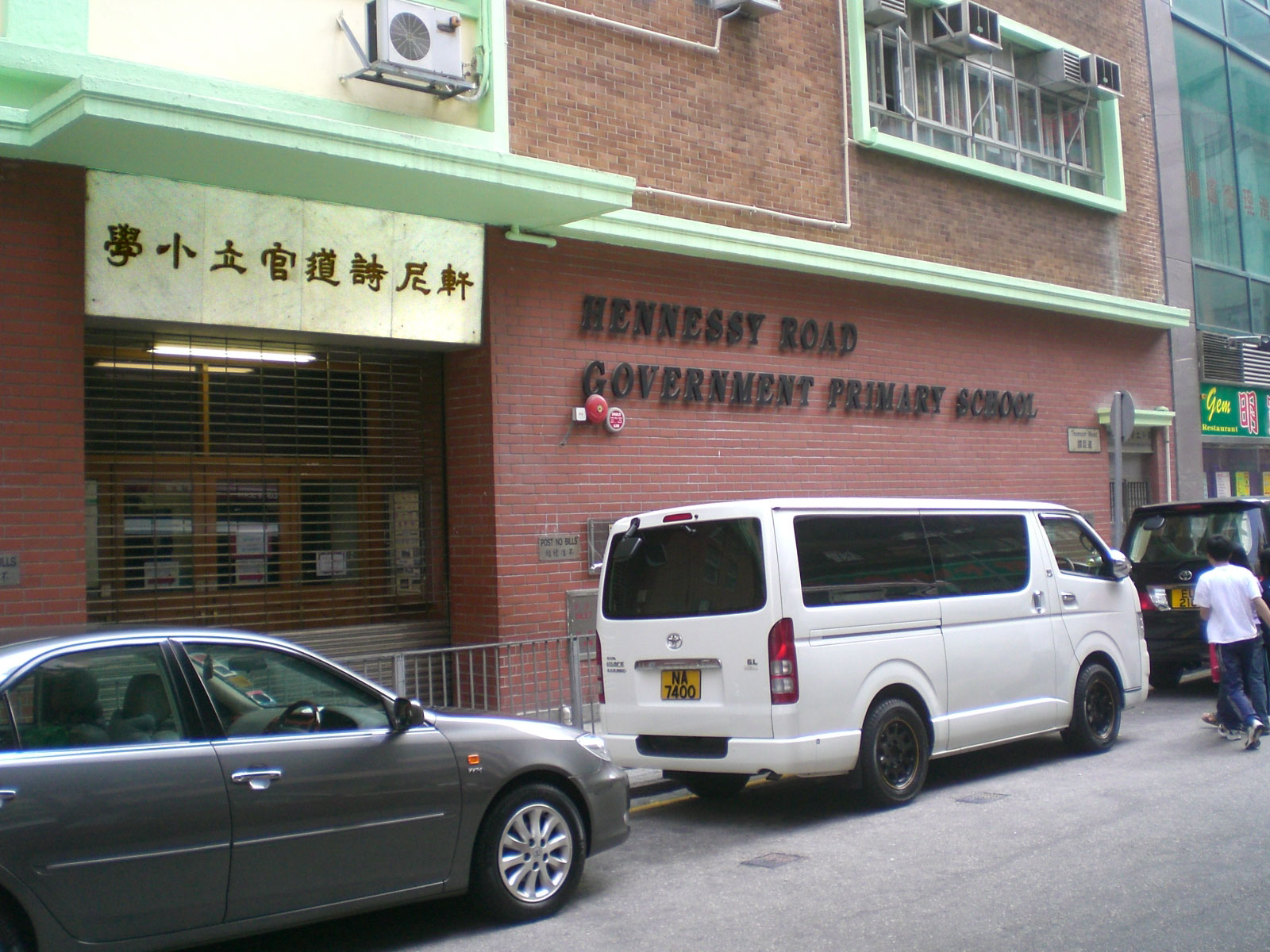
Hennessy Road Government Primary School (軒尼詩道官立小學) in Wan Chai

Wan Chai is in Primary One Admission (POA) School Net 12. Within the school net are multiple aided schools (operated independently but funded with government money) and the following government schools: Hennessy Road Government Primary School (軒尼詩道官立小學) and Sir Ellis Kadoorie (Sookunpo) Primary School (官立嘉道理爵士小學).

Hong Kong Public Libraries operates the Lockhart Road Public Library in the Lockhart Road Municipal Services Building in Wan Chai.

== See also ==
- Wan Chai District
- Wan Chai Pier
- Hong Kong Convention and Exhibition Centre
- Golden Bauhinia Square
