= Central Plaza (Hong Kong) =

Supertall skyscraper in Wan Chai, Hong Kong

- 中環廣場
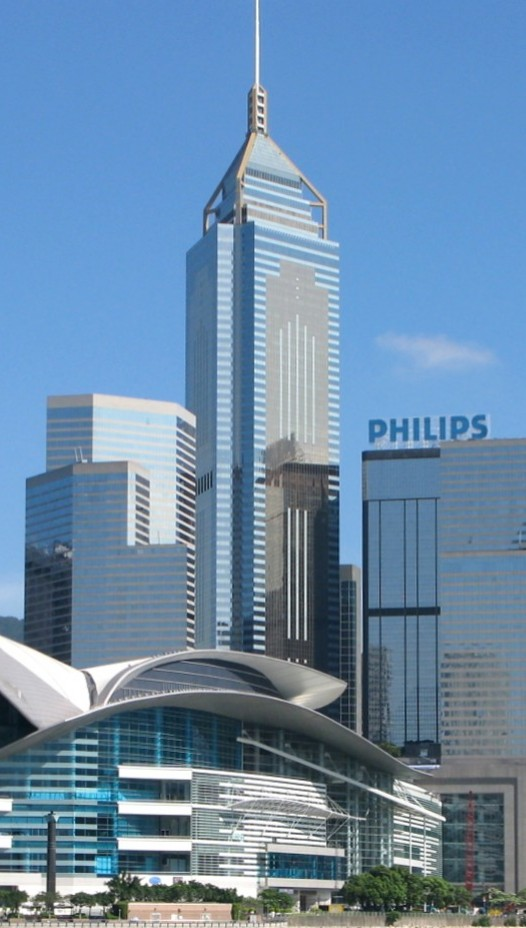
- Central Plaza in June 2009
- Interactive map of the Central Plaza area

General information
- Status: Completed
- Type: Commercial offices
- Architectural style: Postmodern
- Location: 18 Harbour Road; Wan Chai, Hong Kong
- Coordinates: 22°16′48″N 114°10′25″E
- Construction started: 1989; 37 years ago
- Completed: 1992; 34 years ago

Height
- Architectural: 373.9 m (1,227 ft)
- Roof: 309 m (1,014 ft)
- Top floor: 299 m (981 ft)

Technical details
- Floor count: 78; 3 below ground
- Floor area: 172,798 m^{2} (1,859,982 sq ft)
- Lifts/elevators: 39

Design and construction
- Architects: Dennis Lau & Ng Chun Man Architects & Engineers
- Developer: Ryoden Development; Sino Land; Sun Hung Kai Properties
- Structural engineer: Arup
- Main contractor: Manloze Ltd

Central Plaza
- Traditional Chinese: 中環廣場
- Simplified Chinese: 中环广场
- Cantonese Yale: Jūngwàahn Gwóngchèuhng
Transcriptions
Standard Mandarin
- Hanyu Pinyin: Zhōnghuán Guǎngchǎng
- Wade–Giles: Chung^{1}-huan^{2} Kuang^{3}-chʻang^{3}
Yue: Cantonese
- Yale Romanization: Jūngwàahn Gwóngchèuhng
- Jyutping: Zung1waan4 Gwong2coeng4
- IPA: [tsʊŋ˥.wan˩ kʷɔŋ˧˥.tsʰœŋ˩]

Central Plaza is a 78-storey, 374 m (1,227 ft) skyscraper at 18 Harbour Road, in Wan Chai on Hong Kong Island in Hong Kong. Completed in August 1992, it is the third tallest tower in the city after 2 International Finance Centre (2 IFC) in Central and the International Commerce Centre in West Kowloon. It was the tallest building in Asia from 1992 to 1996, until the Shun Hing Square was built in Shenzhen, a neighbouring city. Central Plaza surpassed the Bank of China Tower as the tallest building in Hong Kong until the completion of 2 IFC.

Central Plaza was also the tallest reinforced concrete building in the world, until it was surpassed by CITIC Plaza, Guangzhou in 1996. The building uses a triangular floor plan. On the top of the tower is a four-bar neon clock that indicates the time by displaying different colours for 15-minute periods, blinking at the change of the quarter.

An anemometer is installed on the tip of the building's mast, at 378 metres (1,240 ft) above sea level. The mast has a height of 102 m (335 ft). Central Plaza also houses the world's highest church inside a skyscraper, Sky City Church.

== History ==
The land upon which Central Plaza sits was reclaimed from Victoria Harbour in the 1970s. The 77,800 square feet (7,230 m^{2}) site was auctioned off by the Hong Kong Government at City Hall Theatre on 25 January 1989. It was sold for a record HK$3.35 billion to a joint venture called "Cheer City Properties", owned 50 per cent by Sun Hung Kai Properties and 50 per cent by fellow real estate conglomerate Sino Land and their major shareholder the Ng Teng Fong family. A third developer, Ryoden Development, joined the consortium afterwards. Ryoden Development disposed off its 5% interest for 190,790 square feet of office space in New Kowloon Plaza from Sun Hung Kai in 1995.

The first major tenant to sign a lease was the Provisional Airport Authority, which on 2 August 1991 agreed to lease the 24th to 26th floors. A topping-out ceremony, presided over by Sir David Ford, was held on 9 April 1992.

== Design ==
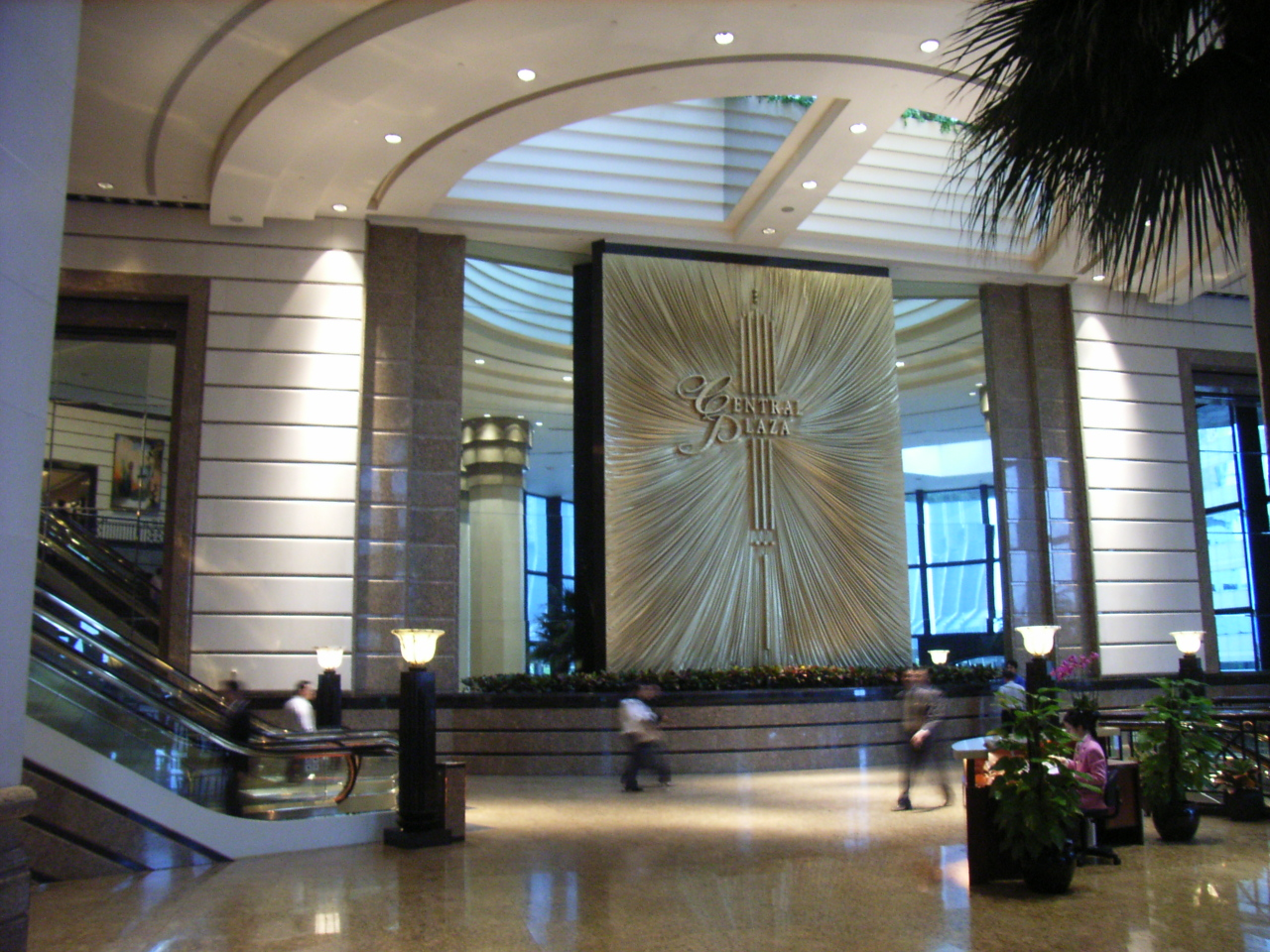
Main Lobby

Central Plaza is made up of two principal components: a free standing 368-metre-high (1,207 ft) office tower and a 30.5-metre-high (100 ft) podium block attached to it. The tower is made up of three sections: a 30.5-metre-high (100 ft) tower base forming the main entrance and public circulation spaces; a 235.4-metre-tall (772 ft) tower body containing 57 office floors, a sky lobby and five mechanical plant floors; and the tower top consisting of six mechanical plant floors and a 102-metre-tall (335 ft) tower mast.

The ground level public area along with the public sitting out area form an 8,400 m^{2} (90,000 sq ft) landscaped garden with a fountain, trees and artificial stone paving. No commercial element is included in the podium. The first level is a public thoroughfare for three pedestrian bridges linking the Mass Transit Railway, the Convention and Exhibition Centre and the China Resources Building. By converting these space for public use, the building gained 20% more plot ratio. The shape of the tower is not truly triangular with its three corners truncated to provide better internal office spaces.

Central Plaza was designed by the Hong Kong architectural firm Ng Chun Man and Associates (since renamed Dennis Lau & Ng Chun Man Architects, or DLN) and engineered by Arup. The main contractor was a joint venture, comprising the contracting firms Sanfield (a subsidiary of Sun Hung Kai) and Tat Lee, called Manloze Ltd.

=== Design constraints ===
==== Triangular shaped floor plan ====
The building was designed to be triangular in shape because it would allow 20% more of the office area to enjoy the harbour view as compared to square or rectangular shaped buildings. From an architectural point of view, this arrangement provides better floor area utilisation, offering an internal column-free office area with a clear depth of 9 to 13.4 m (30 to 44 ft) and an overall usable floor area efficiency of 81%. Nonetheless, the triangular building plan causes the air handling unit (AHU) room in the internal core to also assume a triangular configuration. With only limited space, this makes the adoption of a standard AHU infeasible. Furthermore, all air-conditioning ducting, electrical trunking and piping gathered inside the core area has to be squeezed into a very narrow and congested corridor ceiling void.

==== Super high-rise building ====
As the building is situated opposite the Hong Kong Convention & Exhibition Centre, the best to maximise the harbour views for the building and to not be obstructed by the neighbouring high-rise buildings was to design it to be tall enough to clear the height of neighbouring buildings. However, designing tall buildings bring several difficulties in structural and building services design. For example, excessive system static pressure in water systems, high line voltage drop, and a long distance of vertical transportation (resulting in long waits for elevators). All these problems can increase the capital cost of the building systems and impair the safety operations of the building.

==== Maximum clear ceiling height ====
As a general practice, achieving a clear height of 2.6 to 2.7 m (8.5 to 8.9 ft), and a floor-to-floor height of 3.9 to 4.0 m (12.8 to 13.1 ft) would be required. However, due to the high wind load in Hong Kong for such a tall high-rise building, every increase in building height per metre would increase the structural cost by more than HK$1 million (HK$304,800 per ft). Therefore, a comprehensive study was conducted and finally a floor height of 3.6 m (12 ft) was adopted. With this issue alone, an estimated construction cost saving for a total of 58 office floors, would be around HK$30 million. Yet at the same time, a maximum ceiling height of 2.6 m (8 ft 6 in) in office areas could still be achieved with careful coordination and dedicated integration.

==== Structural constraints ====
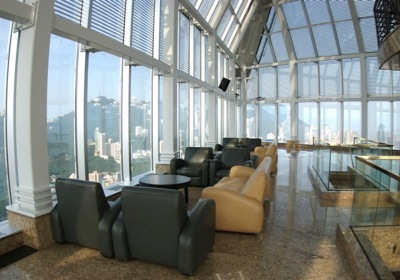
Sky City Church lounge area in the Apex

- The site was a newly reclaimed area with a maximum water table rise of about 2 m (6 ft 7 in) below ground level. In the original brief, a 6-storey basement was required, therefore a diaphragm wall design was chosen.
- The diaphragm wall design allowed for the basement to be constructed by the top-down method. It allowed the superstructure to be constructed at the same time as the basement, thereby removing time-consuming basement construction period from the critical path.
- Wind loading was another major design criterion as Hong Kong is often affected by typhoons. Not only must the structure be able to resist the loads generally and the cladding system and its fixings resist higher local loads, but the building must also perform dynamically in an acceptable manner such that predicted movements lie within acceptable standards of occupant comfort criteria. To ensure that all aspects of the building's performance in strong winds would be acceptable, a detailed wind tunnel study was carried out by Professor Alan Davenport at the Boundary Layer Wind Tunnel Laboratory at the University of Western Ontario.

==== Steel structure vs. reinforced concrete ====
Steel structures are more commonly adopted in high-rise buildings. In the original scheme, an externally cross-braced framed tube was applied with primary/secondary beams carrying metal decking with reinforced concrete slab. The core was also composed of steelwork, designed to carry vertical loads only. Later after a financial review by the developer, they decided to reduce the height of the superstructure by increasing the size of the floor plate so as to reduce the complex architectural requirements of the tower base which means a high strength concrete solution became possible.

In the final scheme, columns at 4.6 m (15 ft) centres and 1.1-metre-deep (3.6 ft) floor edge beams were used to replace the large steel corner columns. As climbing form and table form construction method and efficient construction management are used in this project which make this reinforced concrete structure take no longer construction time than the steel structure. And the most attractive point is that the reinforced concrete scheme can save HK$230 million compared to that of steel structure. Hence the reinforced concrete structure was adopted and Central Plaza is now one of the tallest reinforced concrete buildings in the world.

In the reinforced concrete structure scheme, the core has a similar arrangement to the steel scheme and the wind shear is taken out from the core at the lowest basement level and transferred to the perimeter diaphragm walls. In order to reduce large shear reversals in the core walls in the basement, and at the top of the tower base level, the ground floor, basement levels 1 and 2 and the 5th and 6th floors, the floor slabs and beams are separated horizontally from the core walls.

Another advantage of using reinforced concrete structure is that it is more flexible to cope with changes in structural layout, sizes and height according to the site conditions by using table form system.

== Trivia ==
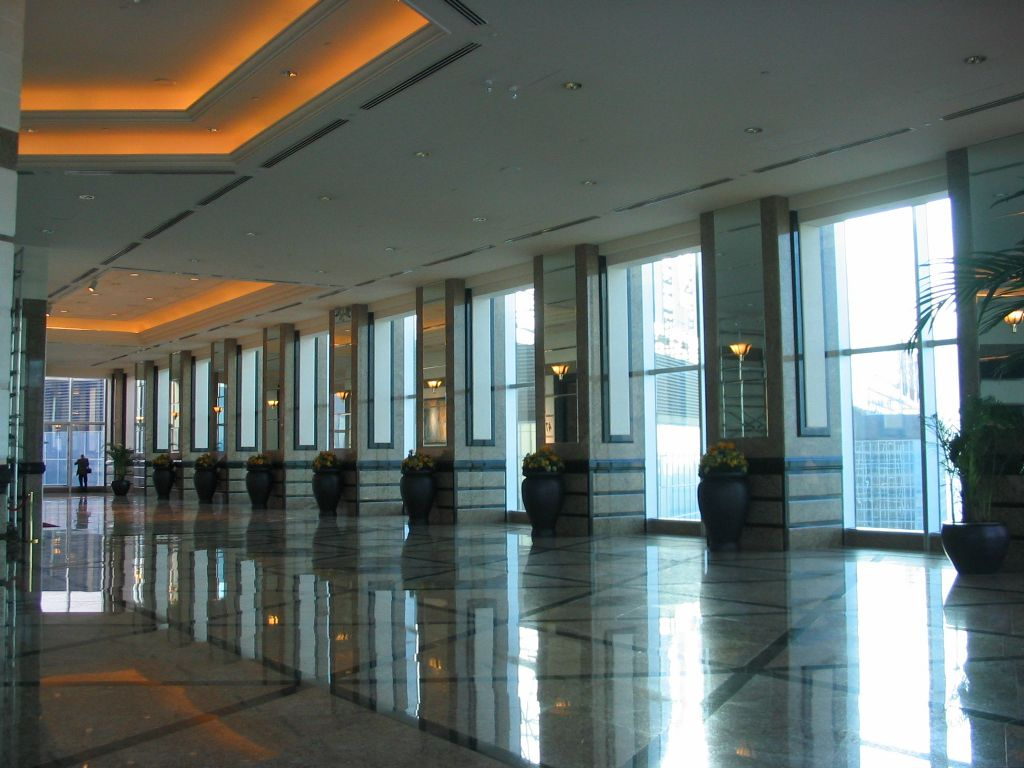
The Sky Lobby on the 46th floor was visited by American TV show The Amazing Race 2.

This skyscraper was visited in the seventh leg of the reality TV show The Amazing Race 2, which described Central Plaza as "the tallest building in Hong Kong" (despite this being inaccurate). Although contestants were told to reach the top floor, the actual task was performed on the 46th floor.

== See also ==
- List of tallest buildings in Hong Kong
- List of buildings and structures in Hong Kong
- List of tallest freestanding structures
