= Starstreet Precinct =

Neighborhood in Hong Kong

Coordinates: 22.276632°N 114.168109°E

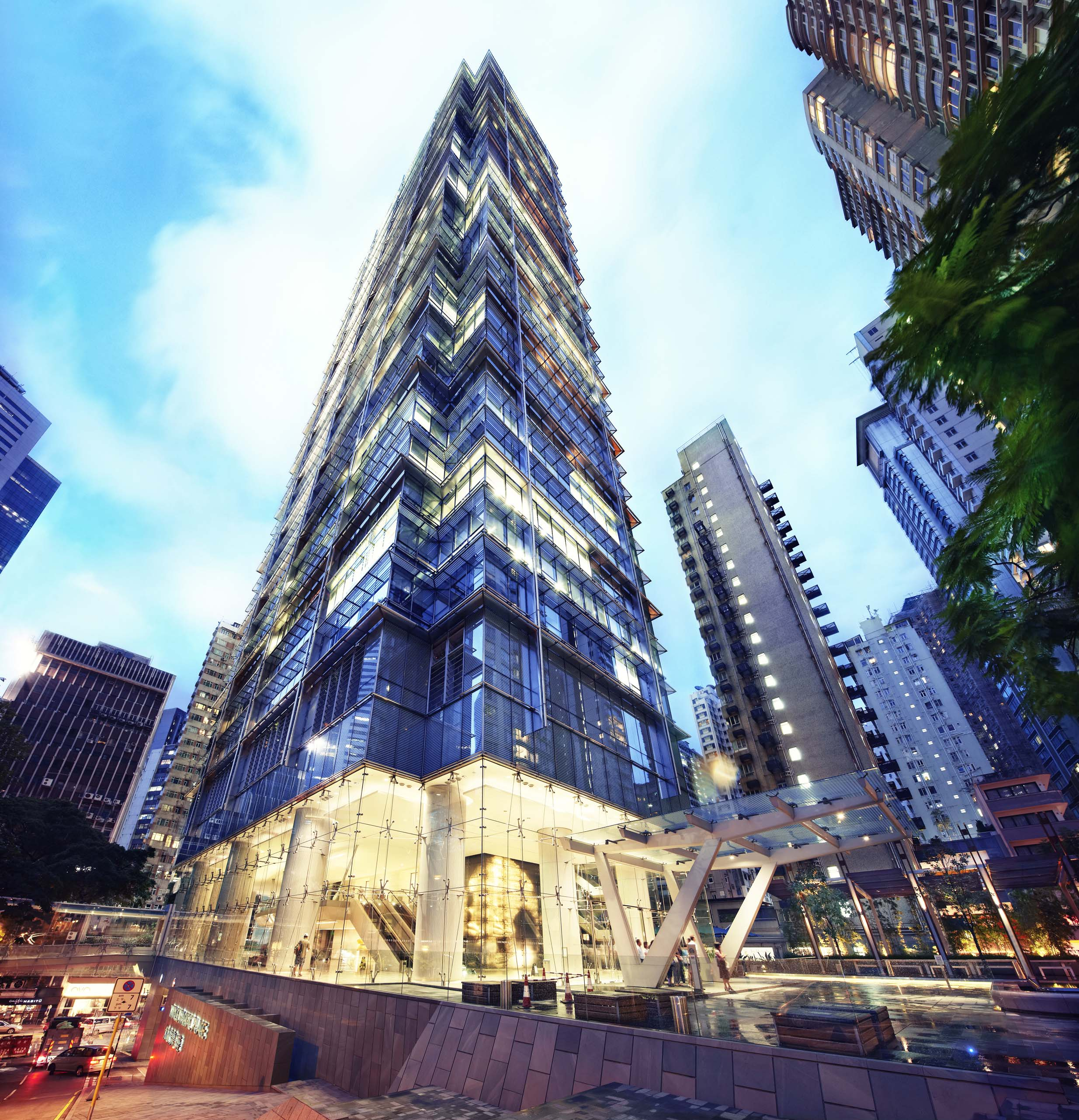
Three Pacific Place.

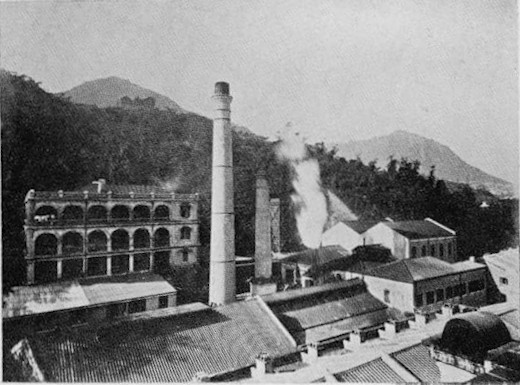
Former Hongkong Electric's Wan Chai Power Plant in the 1900s.

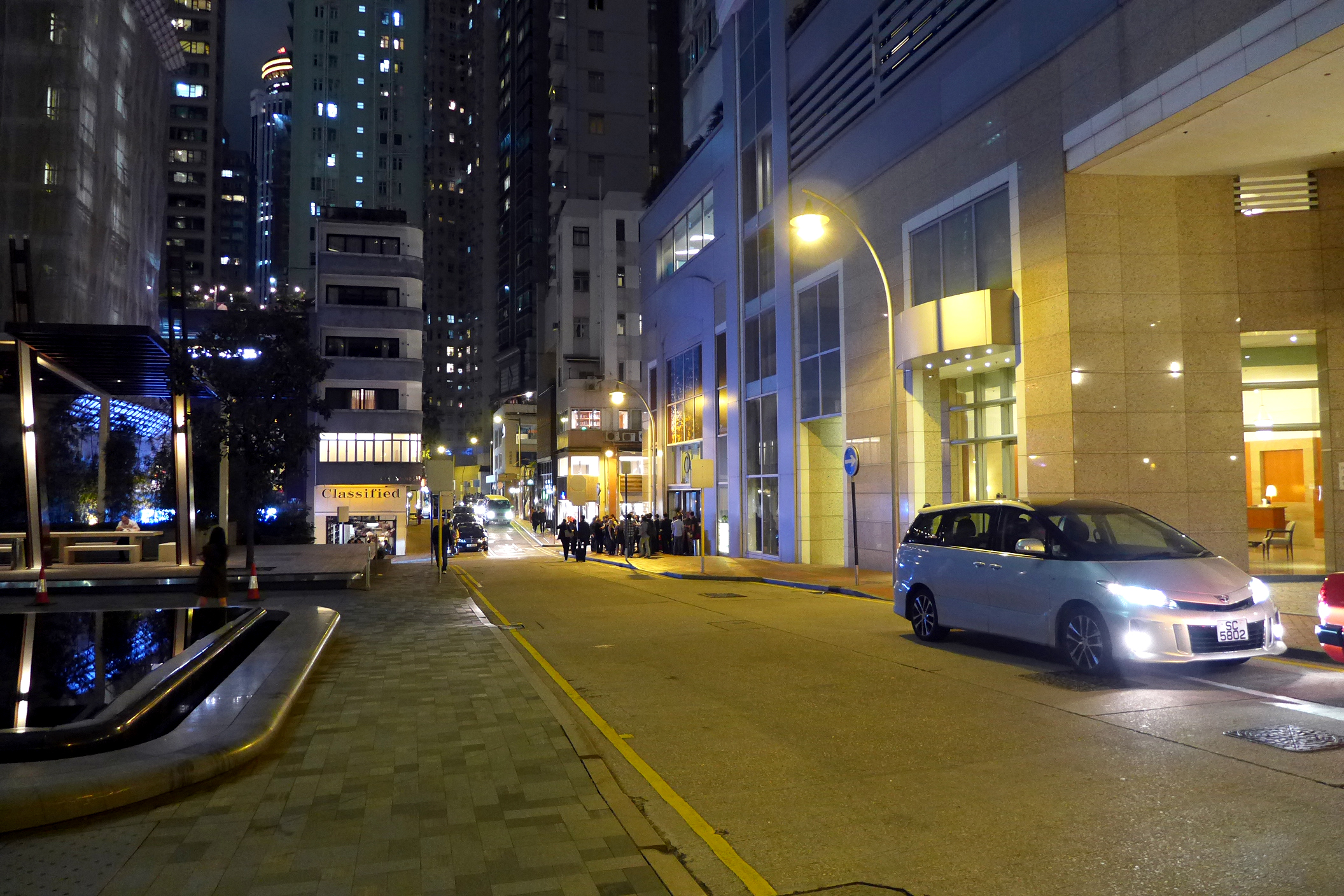
Star Street.

The Starstreet Precinct (Chinese: 星街社區) is a neighborhood in Wan Chai, Hong Kong, centred on Three Pacific Place and comprising mainly Star Street (星街), Moon Street (月街), Sun Street (日街), St. Francis Street (聖佛蘭士街), St. Francis Yard (進教圍), and Wing Fung Street (永豐街).

== History ==
The hilly area of the streets was the earliest burial ground assigned by the Hong Kong Government in 1841 for the non-Chinese population. This was removed in 1889 and replaced by residential buildings for local Chinese.

In 1890, Star Street became the site of Hongkong Electric's Wan Chai Power Plant, the first electricity generating station in Hong Kong. In celebration of the new street lights brought by the plant, the surrounding streets were renamed, "sun", "moon" and "star" as in the Three Character Classic. The station was demolished in 1922.

Starting in 1988, Swire Properties, the developer of Pacific Place, started acquiring properties in the neighbourhood. Having acquired a large number of properties there, they started transforming the area into a commercial neighbourhood. They retained ownership of the car parks, shops and restaurants, and went into such details as designing specific street signs.

== Features ==
The area has now evolved into a shopping and dining area with cafés restaurants, bars, galleries, florists and home design outlets as well as arts and cultural programmes like art exhibitions, charity events and cultural performances.

Together with a landscaped environment, these shops have significantly modified the area's economic profile and aspect. The Three Pacific Place Link connects the precinct to the rest of the Pacific Place complex and the Admiralty MTR station. The 280-metre (310-yard) link, equipped with travelators, was completed in 2007.

== See also ==
- Wan Chai Heritage Trail
