= China Resources Building =

Building in Wan Chai, Hong Kong

Coordinates: 22.280162°N 114.175435°E

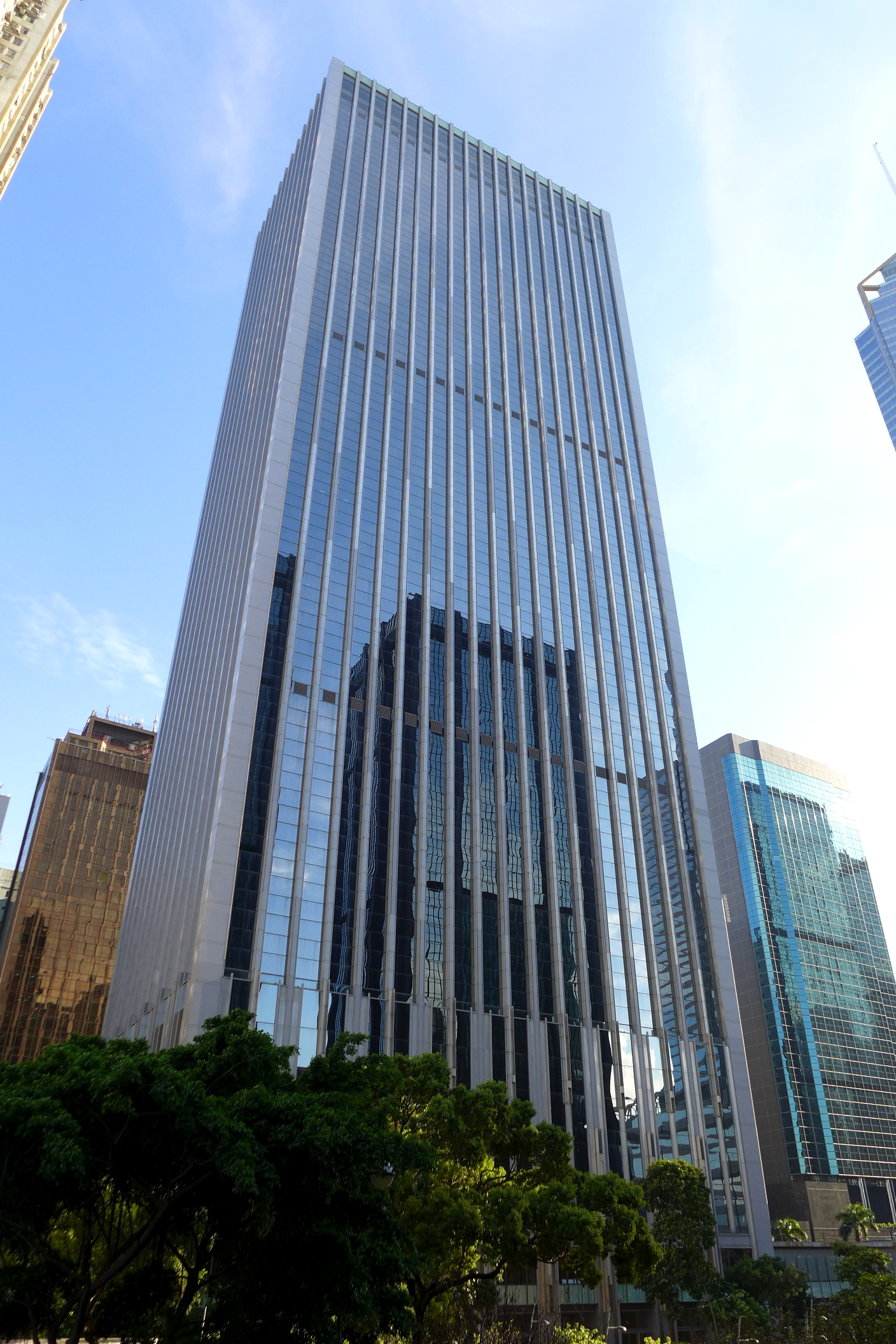
- China Resources Building after renovation
- Traditional Chinese: 華潤大廈
- Simplified Chinese: 华润大厦
Transcriptions
Standard Mandarin
- Hanyu Pinyin: Huárùn Dàshà
Yue: Cantonese
- Jyutping: waa4 jeon6 daai6 haa6

China Resources Building (Chinese: 華潤大廈) is a 50-floor office building located at 26 Harbour Road in Wan Chai North, Hong Kong. It was built in 1983.

== Tenants ==
- China Resources Enterprise
- Consulate of North Korea

== See also ==
- Great Eagle Centre
- China Resources Enterprise
