= Harbour Road =

Road in Wan Chai, Hong Kong

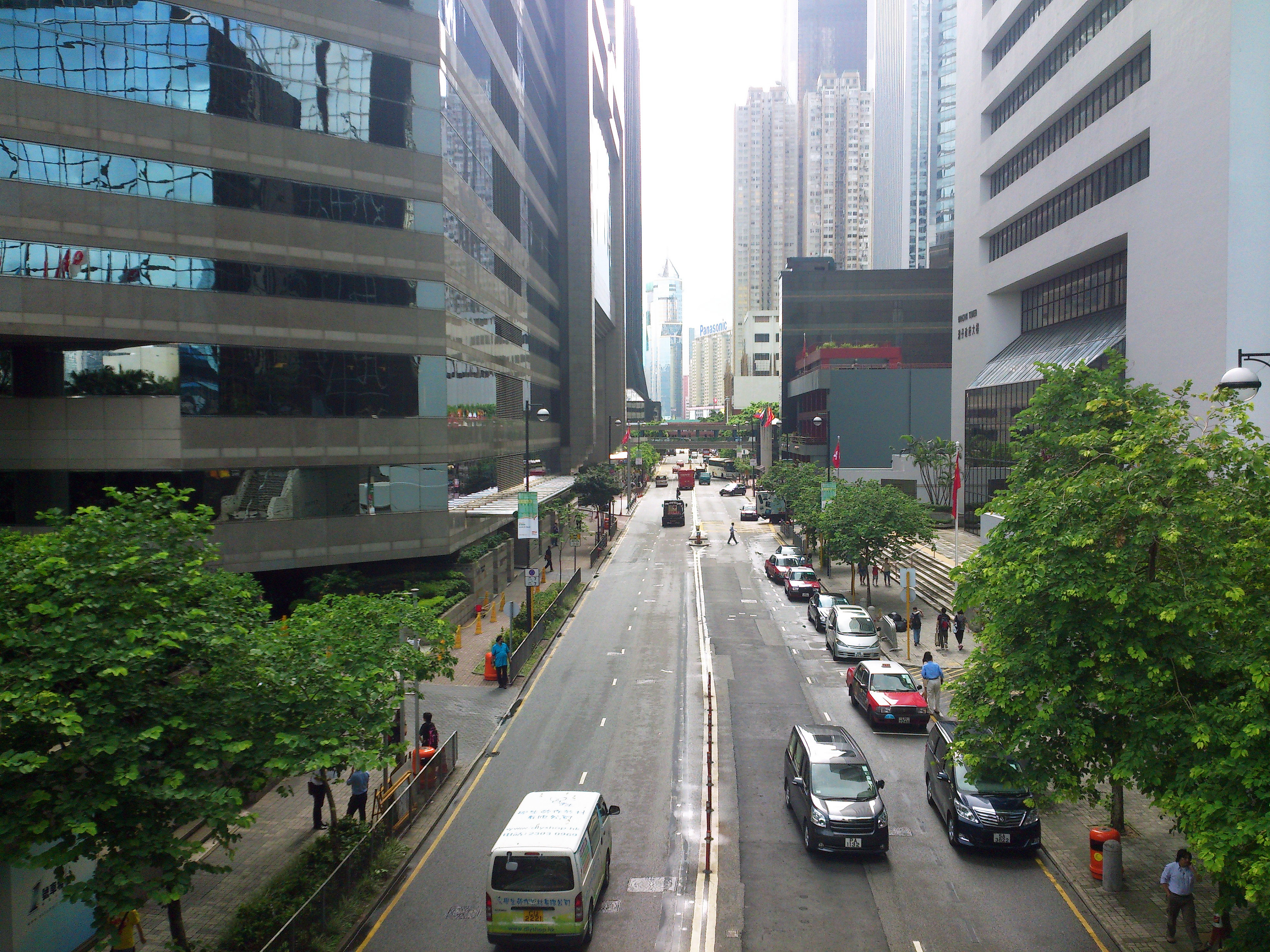
- Harbour Road
- Traditional Chinese: 港灣道
- Simplified Chinese: 港湾道
Transcriptions
Standard Mandarin
- Hanyu Pinyin: Gǎngwān Dào
Yue: Cantonese
- Jyutping: gong2 waan1 dou6

Harbour Road (Chinese: 港灣道) is a road in Wan Chai District, Hong Kong, located in the north of Wan Chai, Hong Kong Island.

The western end of the road connects to the intersection of Fenwick Pier and Fenwick Road, the middle section is perpendicular to Fleming Road and the eastern end is to Tonnochy Road, largely parallel to Gloucester Road and Convention Avenue.

== Notable buildings ==
- Central Plaza
- Hong Kong Convention and Exhibition Centre
- Sun Hung Kai Centre
- Hong Kong Arts Centre
- Hong Kong Academy for Performing Arts
- Wanchai Tower
- Shui On Centre
- China Resources Building
- Australian Consulate-General, Hong Kong and Macau

== See also ==
- List of streets and roads in Hong Kong
