= Victoria Park Road =

Road in Hong Kong

Coordinates: 22.282847°N 114.184673°E

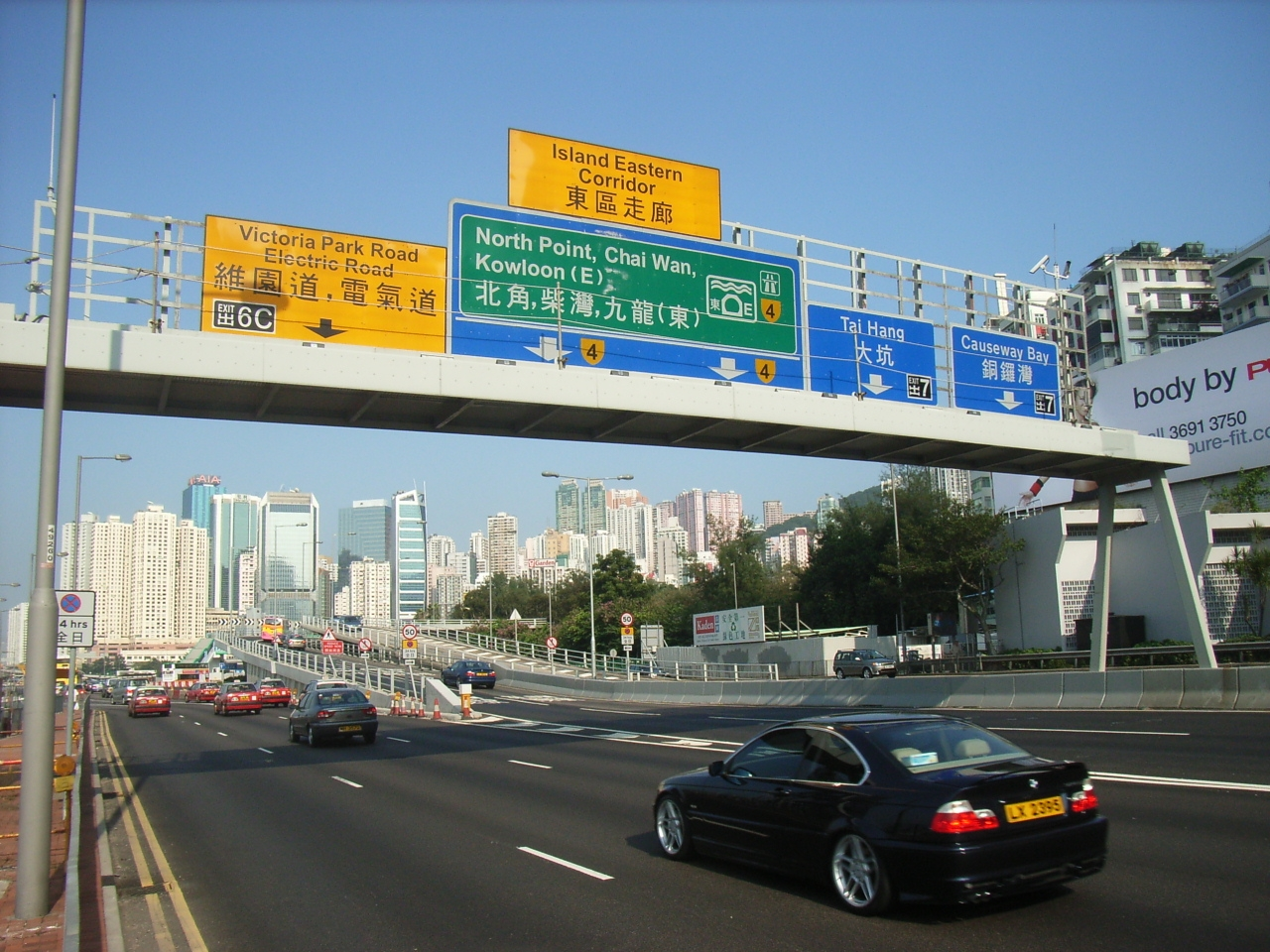
Victoria Park Road in October 2006

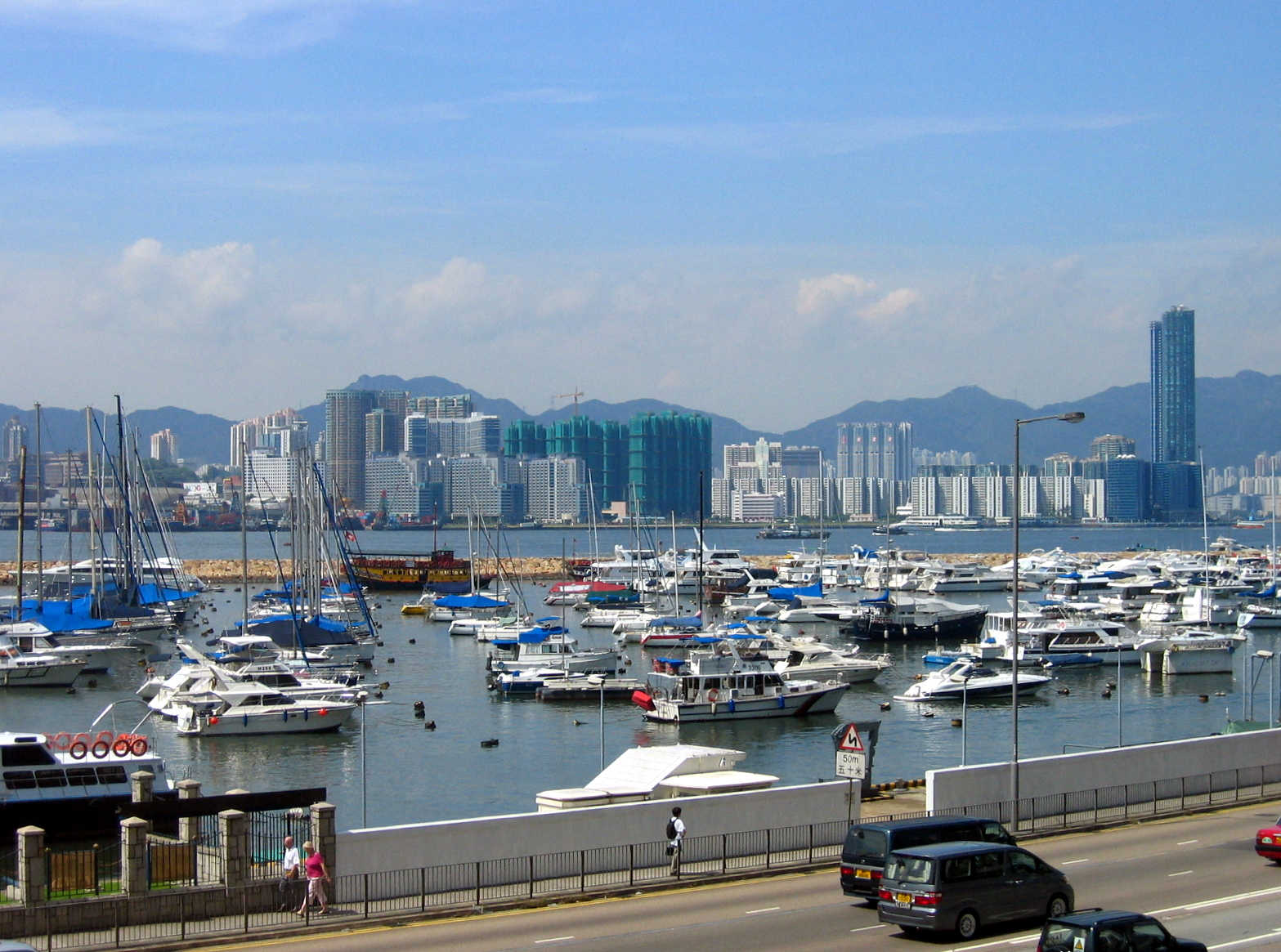
Victoria Park Road along the Causeway Bay Typhoon Shelter in August 2006.

Victoria Park Road (Chinese: 維園道) is a major road in Causeway Bay, Hong Kong. Opened to traffic in 1972 (alongside the Cross-Harbour Tunnel) the 750 metre long road is named after the eponymous park, which is located on its southern side. Its western section between Gloucester Road and the Island Eastern Corridor served as a portion of Route 4 prior to completion of the Central–Wan Chai Bypass.

The road begins where the eastbound carriageway of Gloucester Road ends near the Police Officers' Club and Jardine Noonday Gun – both of which are located within Causeway Bay Typhoon Shelter – and terminates at the junction of Hing Fat Street and Gordon Road.

In 2022, the section of the harbour-front between the road and Causeway Bay Typhoon Shelter was redeveloped and expanded as part of the overall development of Victoria Harbour waterfront.

Preceded by Island Eastern Corridor	Hong Kong Route 4 Victoria Park Road	Succeeded by Gloucester Road
