= Causeway Bay Typhoon Shelter =

Sheltered anchorage in Hong Kong

Coordinates: 22.28570°N 114.18520°E

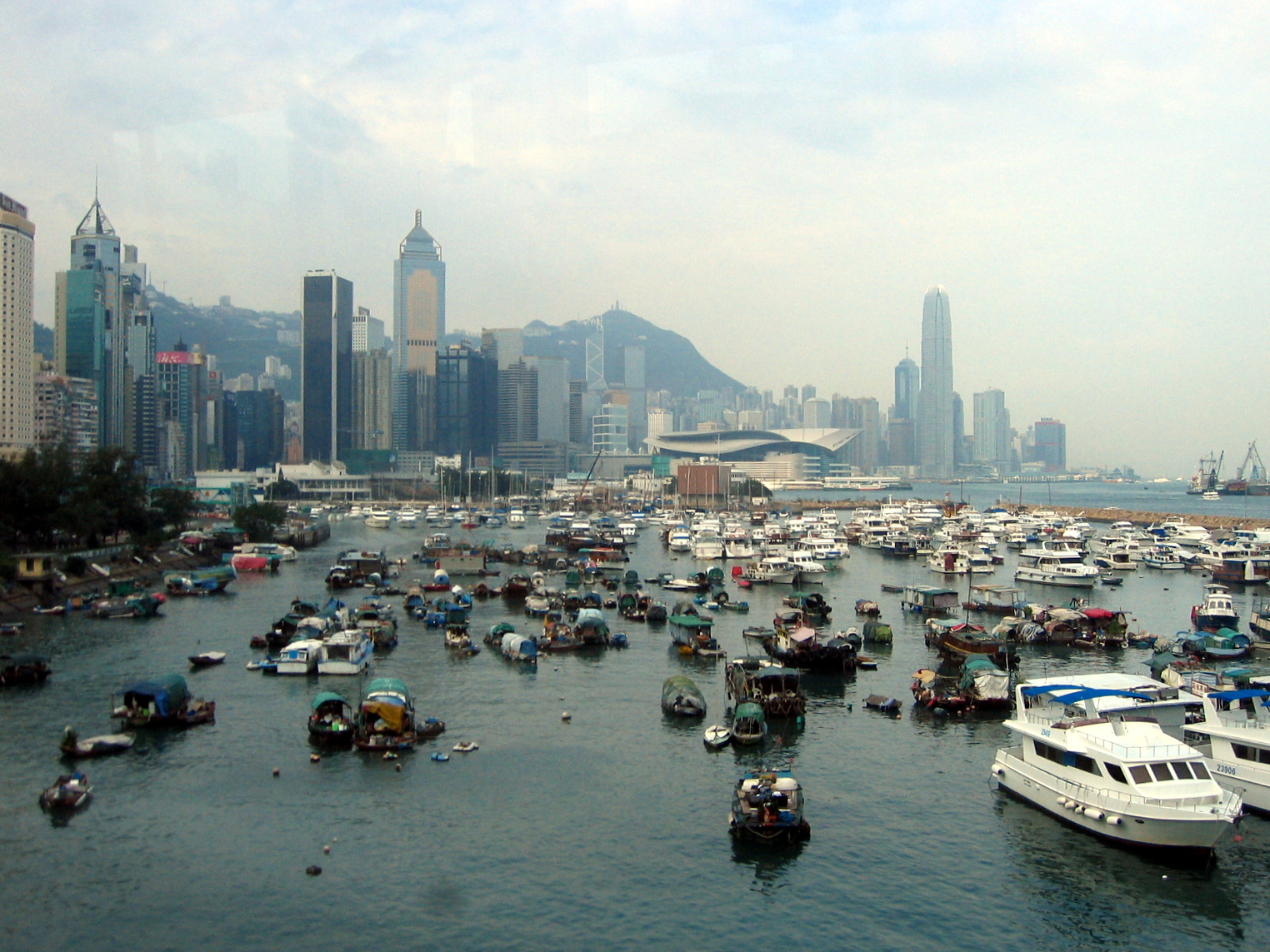
- Causeway Bay Typhoon Shelter in November 2006
- Traditional Chinese: 銅鑼灣避風塘
- Simplified Chinese: 铜锣湾避风塘
- Jyutping: Tung^{4} Lo^{4} Waan^{1} bei^{6} fung^{1} tong^{4}
Transcriptions
Standard Mandarin
- Hanyu Pinyin: Tónglúowān bìfēngtáng
Yue: Cantonese
- Jyutping: Tung^{4} Lo^{4} Waan^{1} bei^{6} fung^{1} tong^{4}

Causeway Bay Typhoon Shelter is a typhoon shelter located in Causeway Bay, Hong Kong, between the Hong Kong Island entrance of Cross-Harbour Tunnel on Kellett Island and Island Eastern Corridor. It was the first typhoon shelter in Hong Kong. It is roughly 17 hectares in area.

== History ==
The original typhoon shelter was built after the 1874 typhoon, at the present location of Victoria Park, to provide shelter for fishing boats during storms. It was completed in 1883 with a breakwater only 427 metres (1,400 feet) long. The cost was HK$96,500.

In December 1903, a legislative council member, Gershom Stewart, suggested that the typhoon shelter be expanded. The motion was passed but expansion works could not be carried out due to lack of capital. The Legislative Council and the Hong Kong Chamber of Commerce questioned the Hong Kong Government on the expansion in 1904 and 1906, but the Government did not give any response.

On 18 September 1906, a typhoon struck Hong Kong, destroying 3,653 boats and killing 15,000 people, most of them fishermen. In March 1908, the Government finally carried out expansion works on the typhoon shelter, deepening it by 3 metres (9 feet) and expanded it to 30 hectares (75 acres).

In 1953, the typhoon shelter was moved northwards to its present site and the original typhoon shelter was reclaimed to provide land for Victoria Park. The new typhoon shelter had a size of 26 hectares (65 acres). However, reclamation projects which started in the typhoon shelter during the late 1960s to construct the Cross-Harbour Tunnel decreased the size of the typhoon shelter.

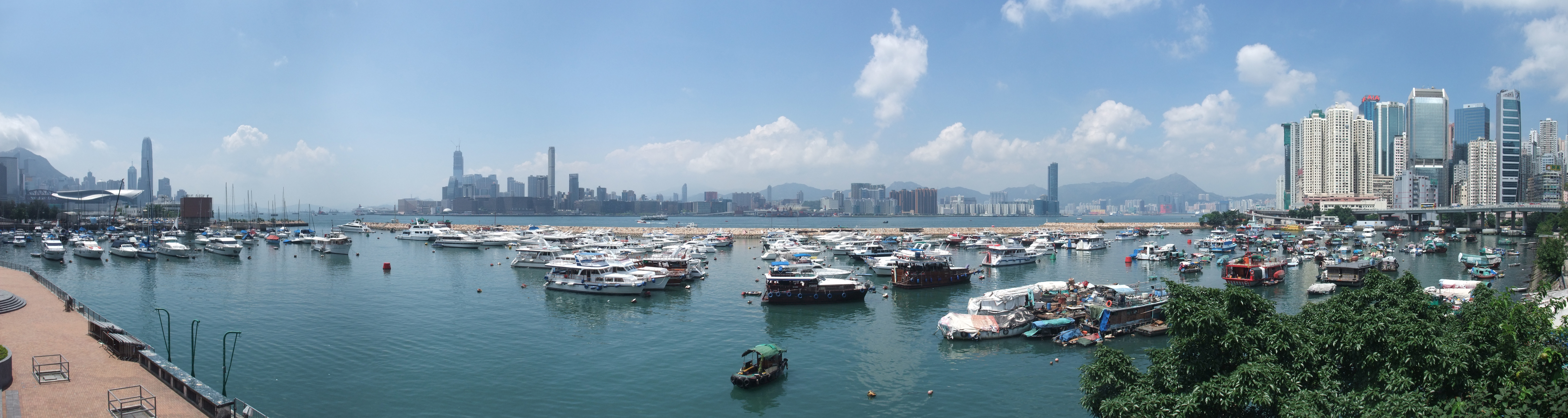
Panoramic view of Causeway Bay Typhoon Shelter in August 2008.

Much of the shelter was temporarily reclaimed as a working area for construction of the Central–Wan Chai Bypass (the working for Route 4 Reengineering), an underground road, underworks that were part of the Wan Chai Phase II project of the Central and Wan Chai Reclamation, begun in 2009.

In 2022, the section of harbourfront alongside the shelter, roughly aligning with Victoria Park, was redeveloped and expanded, as part of the overall development of Victoria Harbour waterfront.

== Environmental concerns ==
A 2005 government report singled out the Causeway Bay Typhoon Shelter as having "exceptionally high levels" of tributyltin, exceeding 1000 times the baseline concentration measured in the East Lamma Channel.

== Surrounding roads ==
To the west:

- Cross-Harbour Tunnel

To the south:

- Gloucester Road
- Victoria Park Road

To the east:

- Island Eastern Corridor

== Notable places nearby ==
- Royal Hong Kong Yacht Club
- Noonday Gun
- Central–Wan Chai Bypass
- The Excelsior
- Victoria Park
- Shelter Street, south of Victoria Park reminds of the original typhoon shelter

== See also ==
- List of typhoon shelters in Hong Kong
