= Gloucester Road, Hong Kong =

Major highway in Hong Kong

Coordinates: 22°16′46″N 114°10′31″E

Gloucester Road
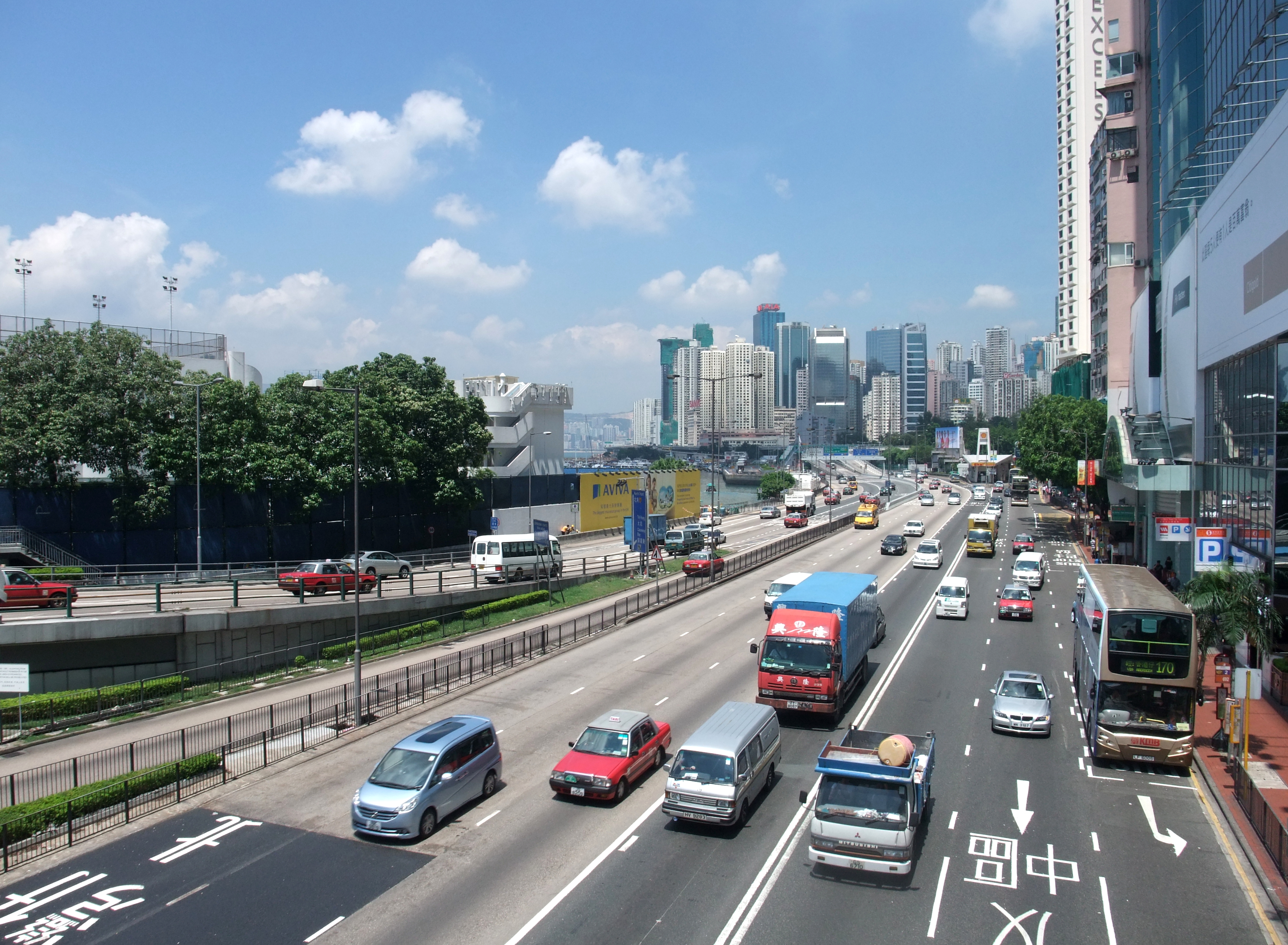
- Gloucester Road as viewed from a pedestrian footbridge in August 2008
- Interactive map of Gloucester Road
- Native name: 告士打道 (Yue Chinese)
- Length: 2.2 kilometres (1.4 mi)
- Location: Wan Chai, Hong Kong
- South end: Causeway Road / Moreton Terrace
- West end: Harcourt Road / Arsenal Street

Gloucester Road
- Chinese: 告士打道
Transcriptions
Standard Mandarin
- Hanyu Pinyin: Gàoshìdǎ dào
Wu
- Wugniu: kau^{5} zy^{6} tan^{3} dau^{4}
Yue: Cantonese
- Jyutping: gou3 si6 daa2 dou6

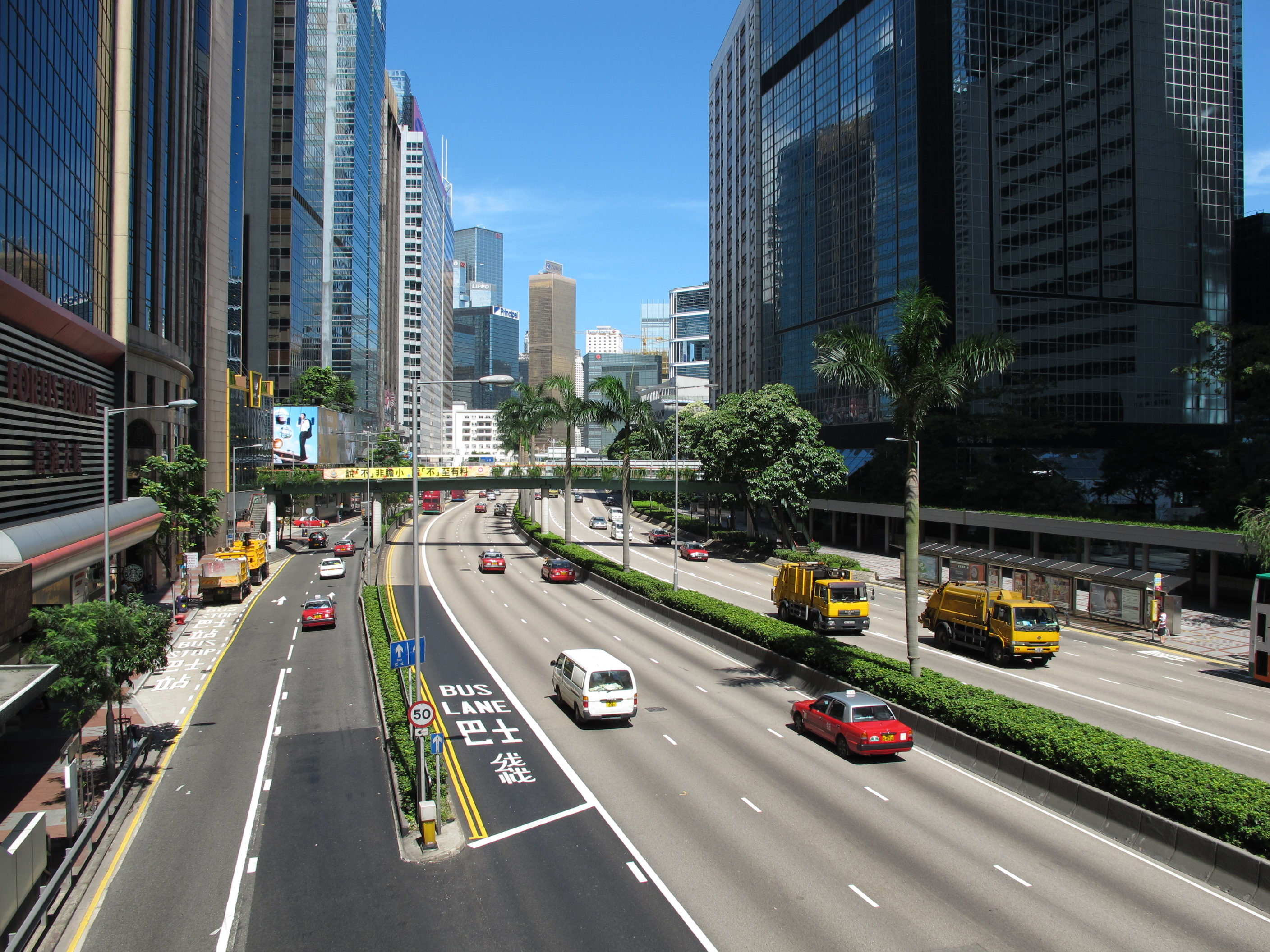
Gloucester Road in Wan Chai in July 2010

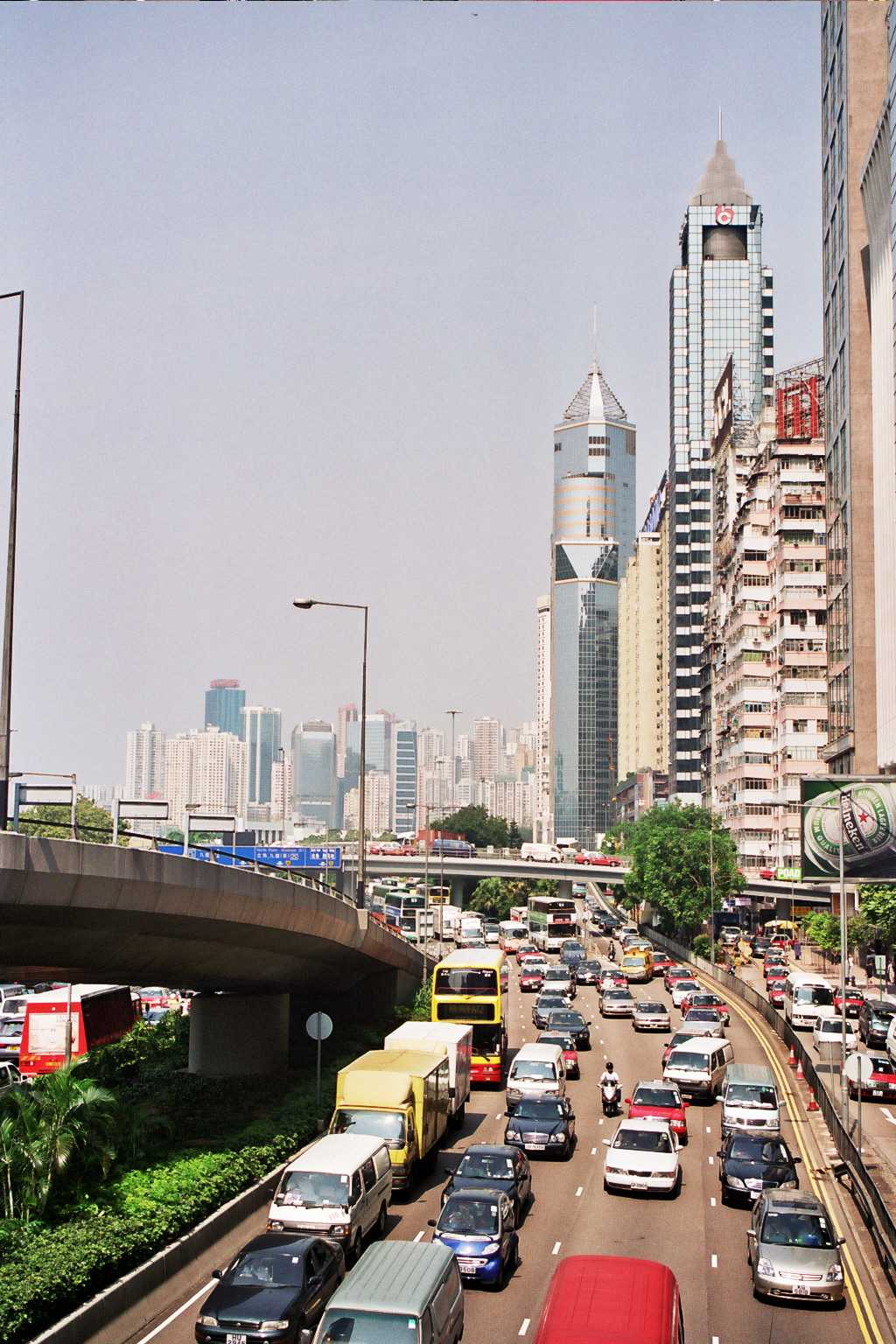
Gloucester Road in Wan Chai in August 2004, near the Wan Chai Sports Ground. Eastbound traffic is to the left hand side of the flyover.

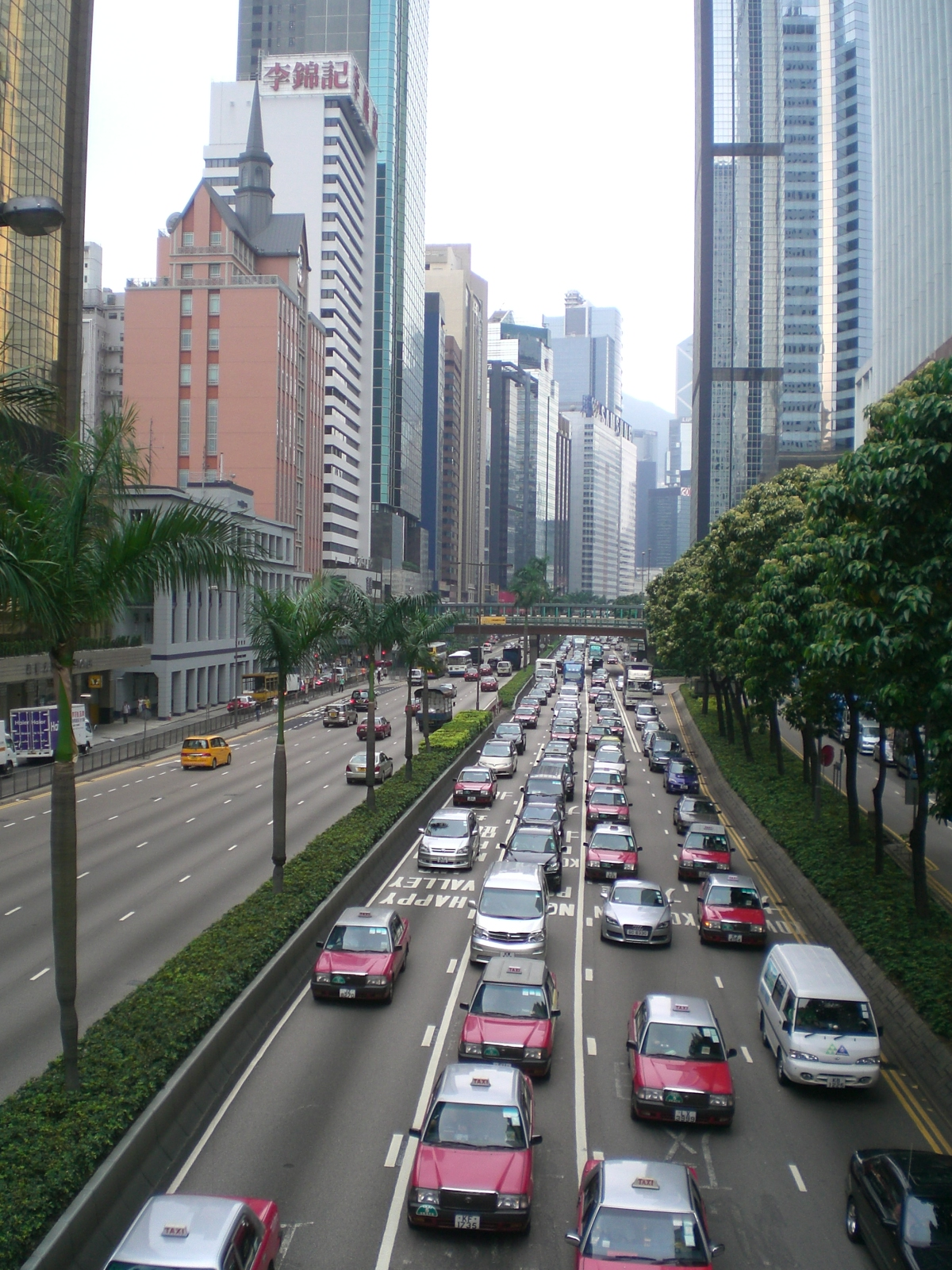
Gloucester Road, near Wan Chai Police Station in May 2007

Gloucester Road (/ˈɡlɒstər/ GLOST-ər; Chinese: 告士打道; Jyutping: gou^{3} si^{6} daa^{2} dou^{6}) is a major highway in Hong Kong. It is one of the few major roads in Hong Kong with service roads. It was named on 14 June 1929 after Prince Henry, Duke of Gloucester, to commemorate his visit to Hong Kong that year. The road is 2.2 kilometres (1.4 mi) in length, and has a speed limit of 70 km/h (43 mph).

== Location ==
Gloucester Road is in the north of Wan Chai and East Point on Hong Kong Island. It links the eastern end of Harcourt Road with the western end of Victoria Park. It initially formed part of Route 4, and connected the Island Eastern Corridor with Victoria Park Road prior to completion of the Central–Wan Chai Bypass. The road links the Cross-Harbour Tunnel near the Canal Road Flyover. It runs almost parallel to Lockhart Road.

== History ==
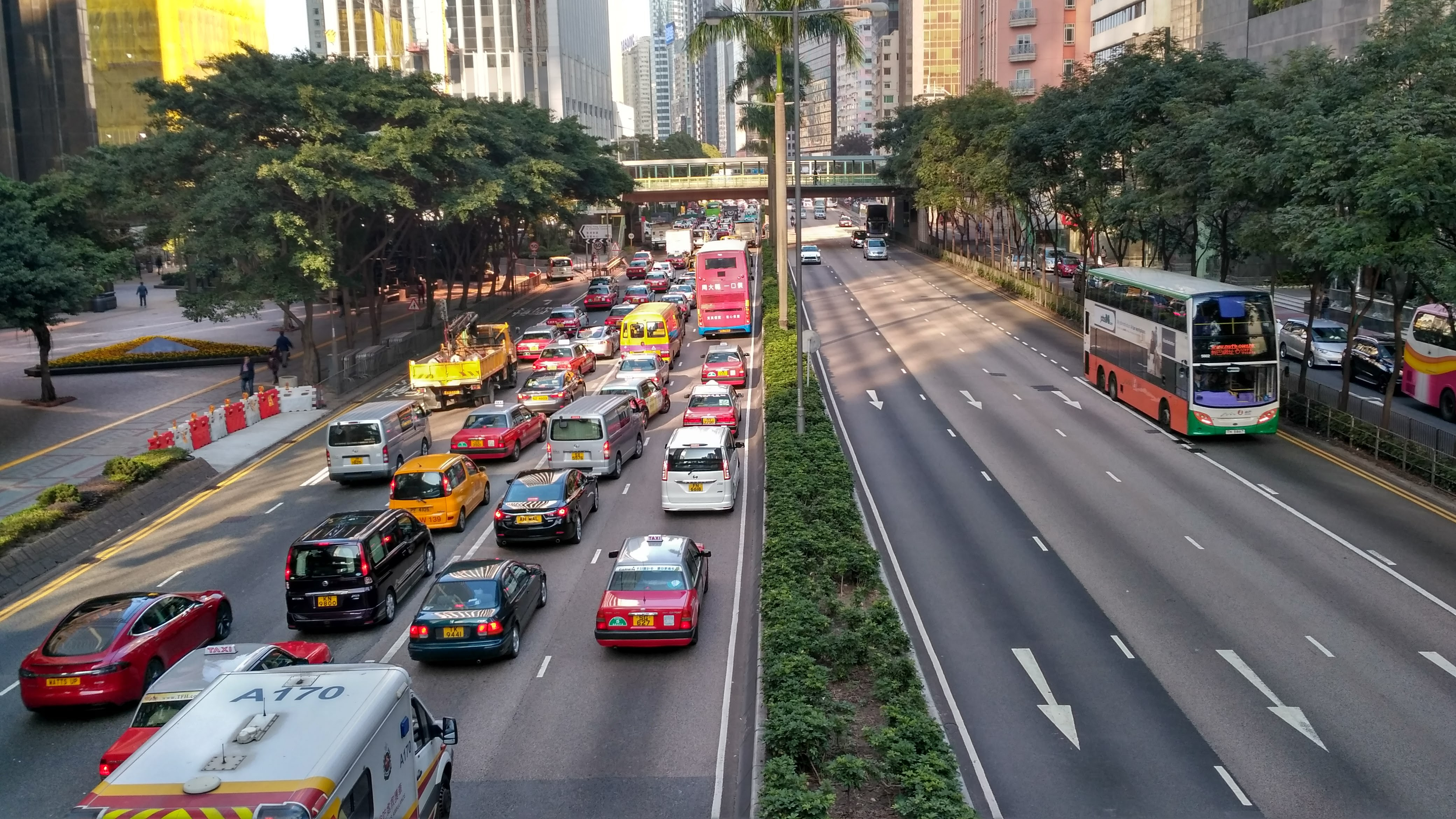
Gloucester Road in Wan Chai, as seen from a footbridge in February 2017

Gloucester Road was built on reclaimed land between 1922 and 1929 as a two-lane road on the seafront. It initially only connected the Royal Naval Arsenal Yard in Admiralty with Percival Street in Causeway Bay. It was extended to Cleveland Street after World War II. A canal west of Victoria Park Road was also reclaimed to form part of Gloucester Road.

The completion of Cross-Harbour Tunnel, Aberdeen Tunnel, alongside other major thoroughfares, resulted in increased traffic output, and thus a new road adjoining Gloucester Road, named Waterfront Road (海傍大道), was built in 1968, and opened to traffic in stages. The original Gloucester Road was then converted to a one-way system, with traffic heading westbound only. In 1980, the two roads were unified under the single name Gloucester Road. The original Gloucester Road is now known as either "Inner Gloucester Road" or "Gloucester Road service road".

== Landmarks ==
- The Hong Kong Academy for Performing Arts, main campus (Nos. 1-3)
- Telecom House (Nos. 4-6)
- Revenue Tower (Nos. 7-9)
- Wan Chai Tower (Nos. 10-12)
- Immigration Tower (No. 13-15)
- Central Plaza (Nos. 16-18)
- Sun Hung Kai Centre (Nos. 25-27)
- Pico Tower (Nos. 64-66)
- Lamborghini Hong Kong Showroom (No. 66)
- Luk Kwok Hotel (Nos. 70-72)
- Wanchai Meeting House of the Church of Jesus Christ of Latter-day Saints (No.118)
- Old Wan Chai Police Station, built in 1932, a Grade II Historic Building (No. 123)
- Wan Chai Sports Ground
- The Gloucester (Nos. 211-216)
- Sino Plaza (Nos. 256–258)
- Elizabeth House (Nos. 241-255)
- World Trade Centre (Nos. 277-279)
- Police Officer Club (Nos. 259-261)
- The Excelsior (Nos. 280-282)
- Windsor House (Nos. 313-315)
- Noonday Gun, across the road from The Excelsior
- China Resources Building
- Causeway Bay Typhoon Shelter

== See also ==
- List of streets and roads in Hong Kong

Preceded by Victoria Park Road	Hong Kong Route 4 Gloucester Road	Succeeded by Harcourt Road
