= Noon Gun =

Historic time signal in Cape Town, South Africa since 1806

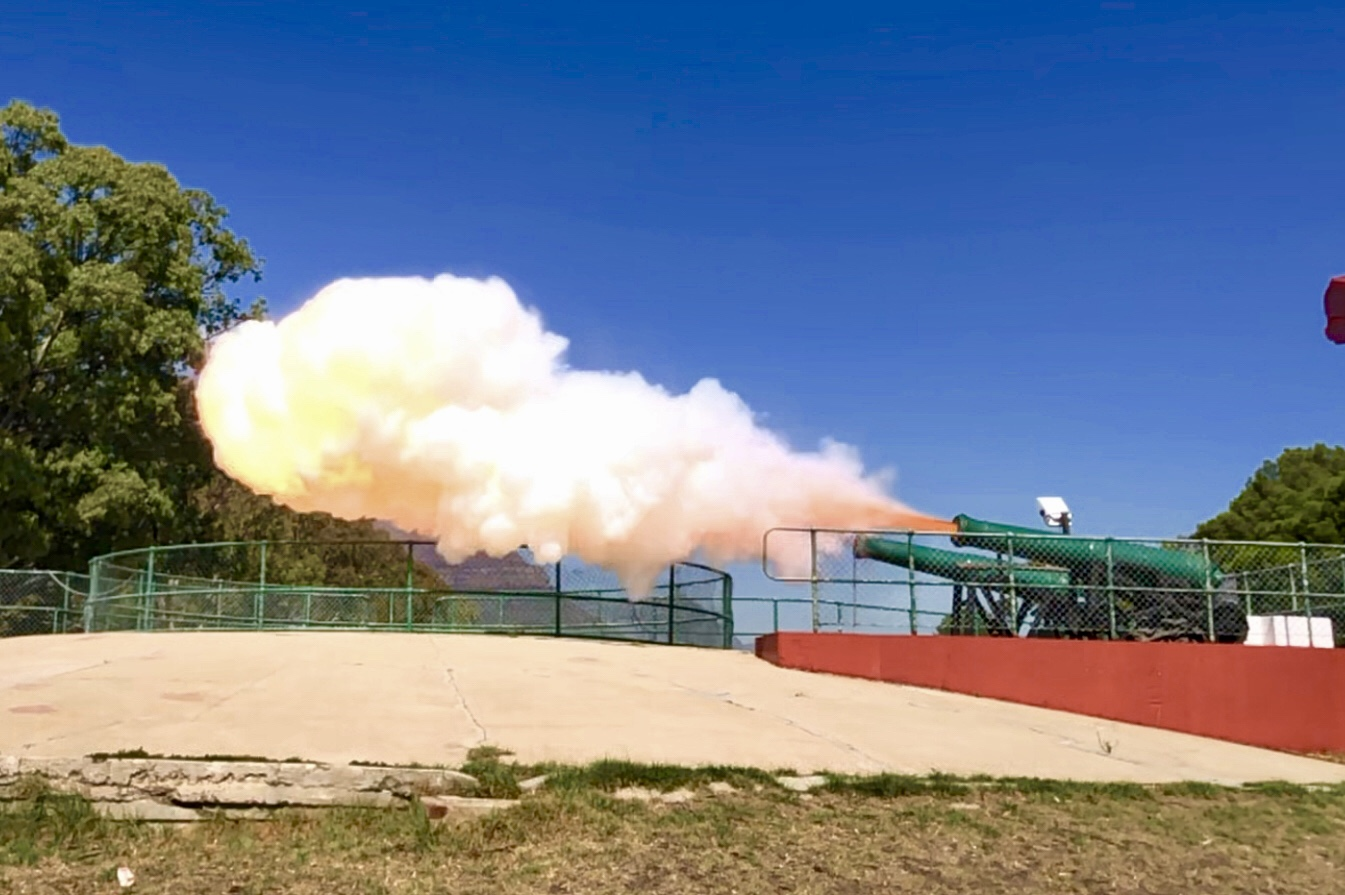
Seen firing on 4 April 2018

Noon Gun firing in slow motion

Video of the Noon Gun being fired in Cape Town. The gun is fired at precisely 12:00 every day from Signal Hill.

The Noon Gun is a time signal in Cape Town, South Africa, since 1806. It consists of a pair of black powder Dutch naval guns, fired alternatingly with one serving as a backup. The guns are situated on Signal Hill, close to the centre of the city.

Around 2021, the sightseeing point was officially closed to public entrance. One can still view and hear the firing of the Noon Gun from the parking lot outside the main gate.

A similar tradition exists in different other locations around the world, including in Nice (France), Hong Kong and at both the Québec Citadel and the Halifax Citadel (Canada).

== History ==
The settlement at the Cape of Good Hope was founded by the Dutch in 1652 and the signal guns were originally part of the regular artillery at the Imhoff Battery at the Castle in Cape Town.

The guns, which are still in use today, are 18 pounder smooth bore muzzle loading guns, and were designed by captain Thomas Blomfield in 1786. They were cast by Walker & Co. in early 1794, and proof fired at Woolwich in June 1794. After this type of gun was adopted by the Royal Navy as their standard naval gun, the Noon Guns were brought to Cape Town during the 1795 occupation.

In 1795 during the Napoleonic Wars, Britain took the Cape Colony from the Dutch East India Company ((De) Vereenigde Oostindische Compagnie (VOC) in Dutch). The VOC transferred its territories and claims to the Batavian Republic in 1798 and ceased to exist in 1799. The British handed the Cape Colony back to the Batavian Republic in 1803. However, in 1806 the Cape was occupied again by the British after the Battle of Blaauwberg. Thereafter the British controlled the Cape continuously until it became a part of the independent Union of South Africa in 1910. Shortly after the English took over, the two Dutch guns were removed from the Imhoff Battery and redeployed in town as signal guns, and the Castle received the latest English 18-pounders. Because the very loud report of the cannons upset residents nearby, the guns were eventually moved to the somewhat more remote Lion Battery on Signal Hill at 33°54′54.6″S 18°24′41.85″E. The first signal fired from there was on 4 August 1902.

Sailing ships were slow by modern standards and could not store fresh food for long periods, so the provisioning of vessels was one of the major commercial functions at Cape Town in those olden days. The noon Gun in Cape Town can be heard as far as the Parow area if listening closely; Indeed, the city was widely renowned as "The Tavern of the Seas". There were no telephones or telegraphs before the latter half of the 19th century and the sound of the guns travelled much faster than a dispatch rider on a horse. The guns were therefore originally used to announce the arrival of a ship, perhaps requiring provisions for the next leg of its journey, to residents living in the interior. As more modern means of communications and transportation became available, Cape Town discontinued the use of the guns to announce that a ship was in port.

The original guns – 18-pounder, smoothbore muzzle-loaders – are still in use today. The ritual represents one of Cape Town's oldest living traditions. These are the oldest guns in daily use in the world. They fire every day at 12 noon sharp, except Sundays and public holidays, and are maintained by the South African Navy.

== Time signalling ==
In addition to the aforementioned port hailing duties, the guns have had the task of firing a time signal since 1806. According to local tradition, the initial purpose of the gun was to allow ships in port to check the accuracy of their marine chronometers (a precision instrument used aboard ships to help calculate longitude). The gun report might be too inaccurate for ships several kilometers away if they did not correctly compensate for the relatively slow speed of sound. For this reason, ships marked their time by the puff of smoke rather than the sound, and this is one reason the guns are sited high above Cape Town Harbour.

The invention of the more accurate time ball in 1818 soon made time guns redundant for mariners wishing to set their chronometers. The time ball on Signal Hill was used to relay time from the Cape Town Observatory, whose time ball was not visible from all parts of the bay. At precisely 1:30pm Cape Mean Time, the ball would be dropped at the Observatory – an observer on Signal Hill would then drop that more prominent ball too. When setting their chronometers, mariners adjusted their observation of the time ball on Signal Hill by a second to allow for the relay from the observatory.

After the advent of the galvanic telegraph, it became possible to electrically trigger a gun remotely, and since 1864 the Noon Gun has been fired directly from the master clock of the oldest timekeeper in the country, the South African Astronomical Observatory. A South African Navy duty officer is present to ensure both guns are charged, explain the Noon Gun to any onlookers, and manually fire the backup gun in case of some failure with the active gun.

== Notable events ==
There have been few remarkable incidents involving the guns over the centuries. Perhaps the most notable one occurred many decades ago, in the days when horse-drawn traffic was commonplace. The rammer used to tamp the charge into the muzzle was inadvertently left in the bore of the cannon, and when the gun fired the rammer flew down into the city and killed a horse.

One day in June 1895, the gun fired at 10:30 rather than 12:00 when a spider interfered with the relay used to remotely fire the gun.

On Friday 7 January 2005, both the main gun and backup gun failed to fire owing to a technical difficulty. This was the first time in 200 years that the noon gun had not fired as scheduled.

== See also ==
- Category:Time guns
- Smoke signal
