= Kellett Island =

Former island of Hong Kong

Coordinates: 22.284153°N 114.182303°E

- Traditional Chinese: 奇力島
- Simplified Chinese: 奇力岛
Transcriptions
Standard Mandarin
- Hanyu Pinyin: Qílì Dǎo
Wu
- Wugniu: ji^{2} liq^{8} tau^{3}
Yue: Cantonese
- Yale Romanization: Kèih lihk dóu
- Jyutping: kei^{4} lik^{6} dou^{2}

Tang Lung Chau
- Traditional Chinese: 燈籠洲
- Simplified Chinese: 灯笼洲
- Literal meaning: Lantern island
Transcriptions
Standard Mandarin
- Hanyu Pinyin: Dēnglóng Zhōu
Wu
- Wugniu: ten^{1} lon^{2} tseu^{1}
Yue: Cantonese
- Yale Romanization: Dāng lùhng jāu
- Jyutping: dang^{1} lung^{4} zau^{1}

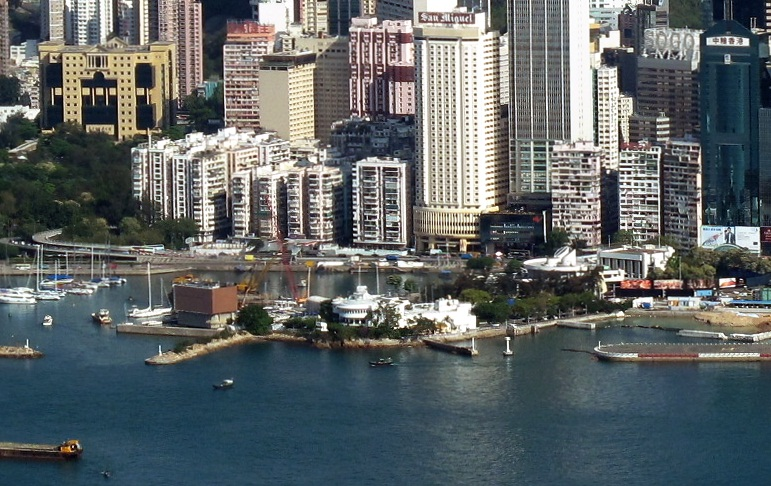
Kellett Island with the Royal Hong Kong Yacht Club buildings in 2011. A portion of the Causeway Bay Typhoon Shelter is visible on the left of the picture.

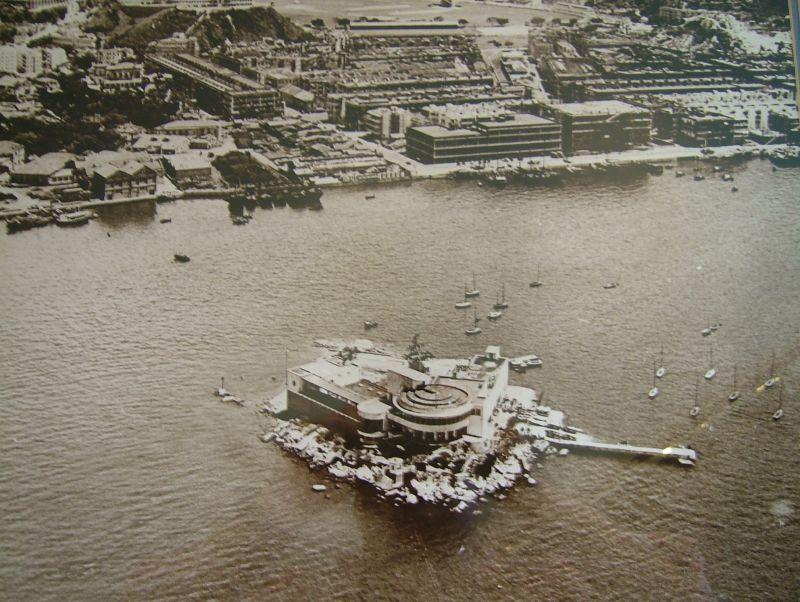
View of Kellett Island, with Royal Hong Kong Club Building and Pier, in 1948.

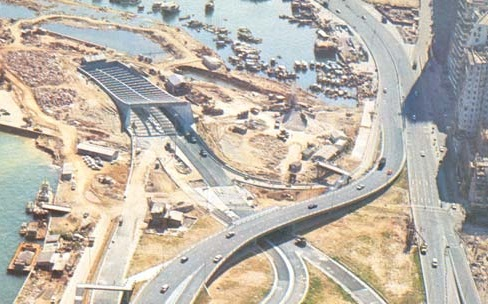
Entrance of the Cross-Harbour Tunnel and land reclamation connecting Kellett Island (upper left) to Causeway Bay in the 1970s.

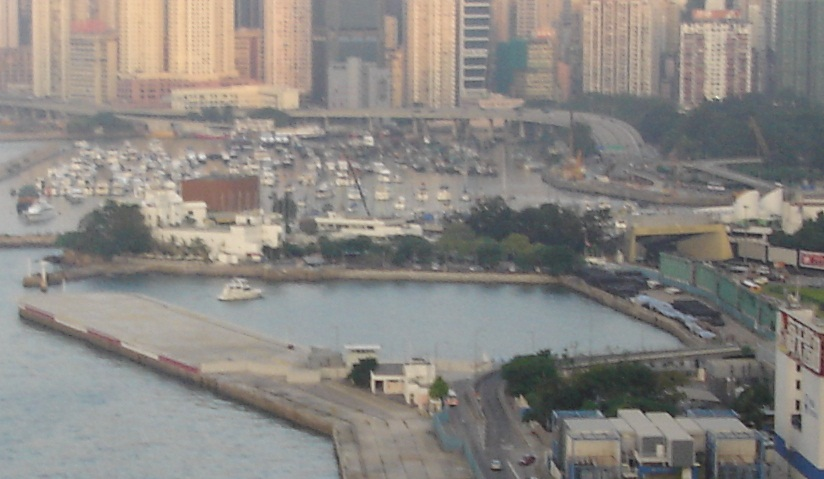
Kellett Island in 2004, viewed from the west. The Royal Hong Kong Yacht Club buildings are visible on the left, the entrance of the Cross-Harbour Tunnel is visible on the right, and the Causeway Bay Typhoon Shelter in the background.

Kellett Island is a former island of Victoria Harbour, off East Point in Hong Kong. It is now connected to Hong Kong Island at Causeway Bay following land reclamation in 1969.

It is located in Wan Chai District.

== Facilities ==
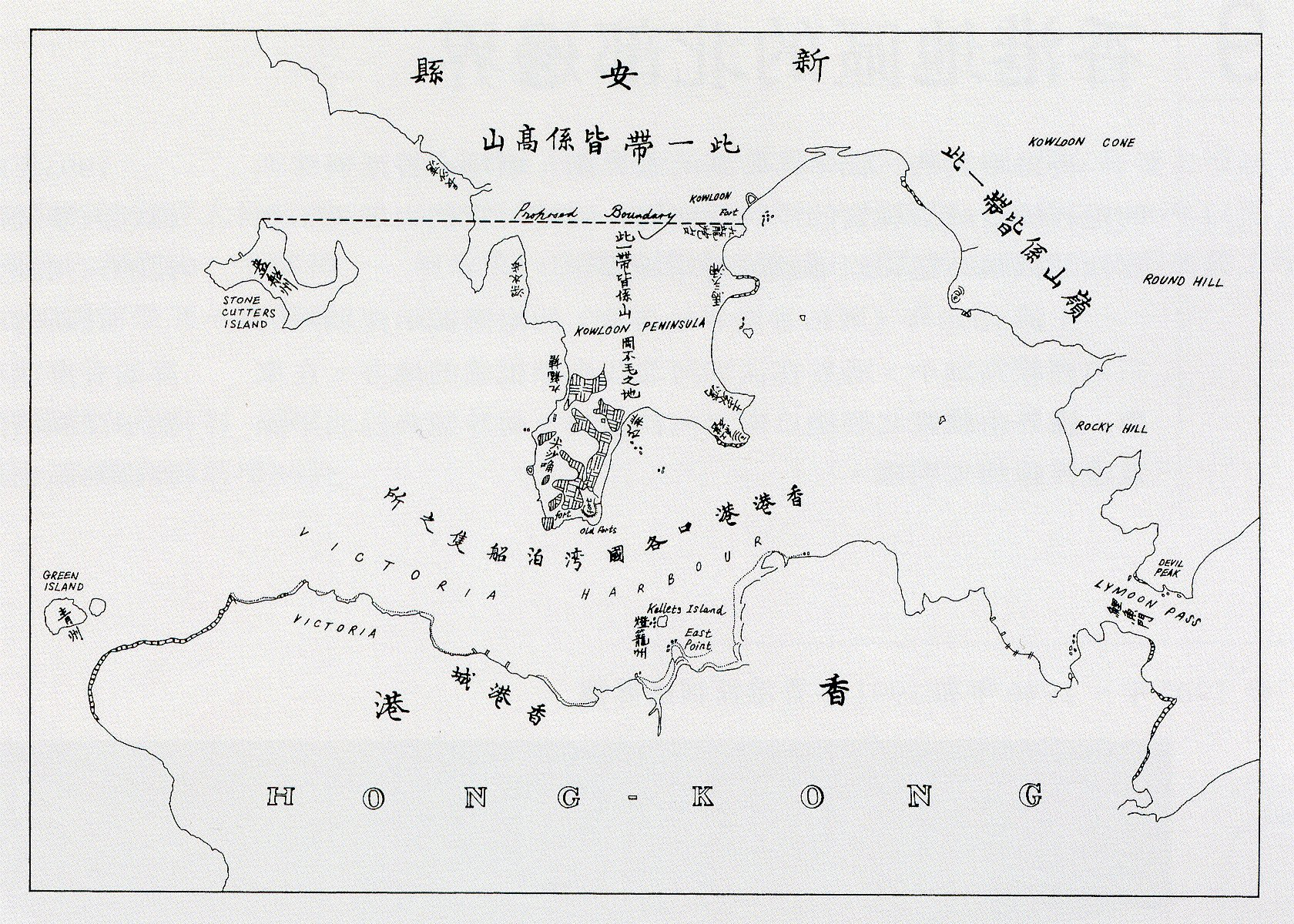
Kellett Island in the Map of Hong Kong in Convention of Peking in 1860

The main buildings of the Royal Hong Kong Yacht Club are located on the former Kellett Island. The former island and the reclaimed land form the western boundary of the Causeway Bay Typhoon Shelter. The southern entrance to the Cross-Harbour Tunnel is located on the Island.

== History ==
The island was ceded to Britain together with Hong Kong Island. A small fort was built on it in 1841 for the protection of the eastern section of Victoria Harbour, and a battery with three cannons was added in 1854. The island was renamed in the 1860s (some sources mention 1842) after the naval officer Sir Henry Kellett. Kellett Bay and Mount Kellett were also named after him. After Kowloon Peninsula was ceded to Britain in 1860, the defense position of Kellett Island declined in importance, and it was used by British armed forces for ammunition and gunpowder storage.

The island remained for the use of the Navy until 1938, when the Royal Hong Kong Yacht Club, formerly located in North Point, moved to Kellett Island. The clubhouse was built in 1939 on the foundations of the old Naval Powder Magazine. The new premises were formally opened on 26 October 1940 by the then Acting Governor, Lieutenant General Sir E. F. Norton.

After the fall of Hong Kong in 1941, occupying Japanese forces kept military supplies there, including fuel, gunpowder, artillery and ammunition. After the War, the Yacht Club was reopened there on 17 September 1945.

A causeway completed in 1952 was built to give access to the island by means other than water. Following reclamation work in the 1960s and the completion of the Cross-Harbour Tunnel in 1972, Kellett Island was connected to Causeway Bay and its original outline disappeared, although the name remained.

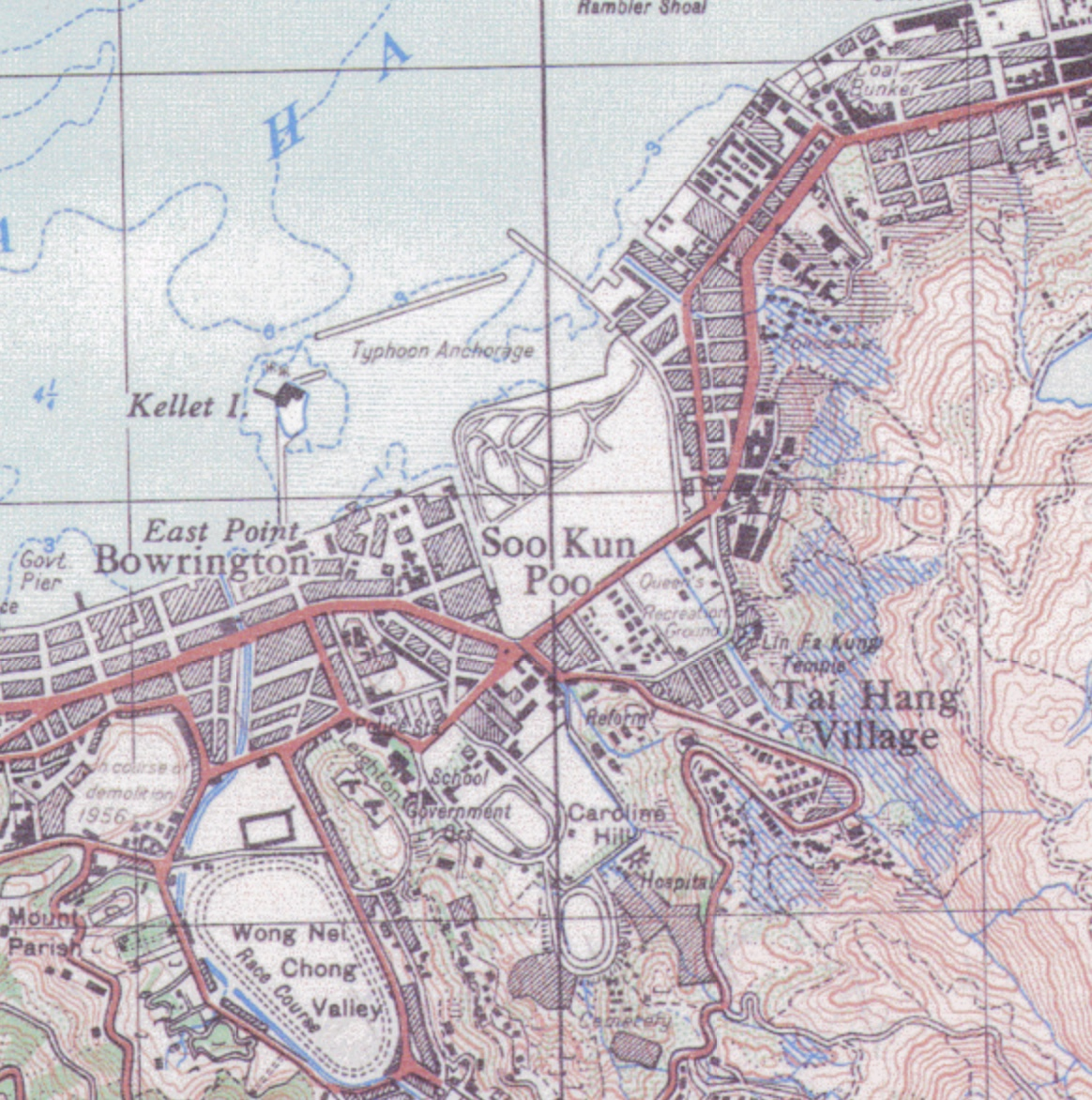
Kellett Island and Causeway Bay in 1957.

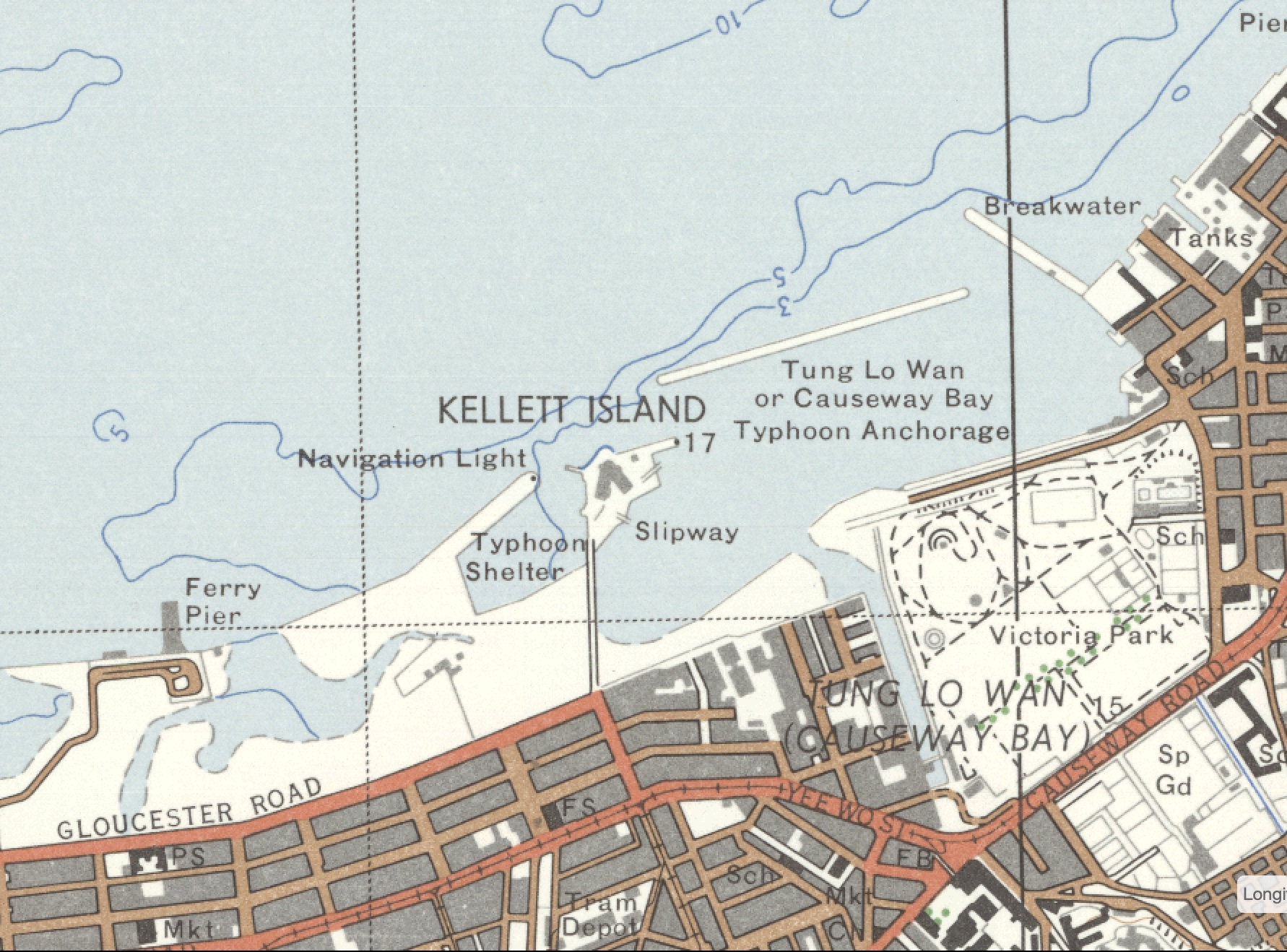
Kellett Island in 1970 February, right before its reclamation and connection with Hong Kong Island.

In October 1991, a pottery jar containing large quantity of Chinese copper coins was discovered at the island by the Royal Hong Kong Yacht Club. The coins were dated to Sui, Tang and Song dynasties (589–1279). The coins and the pottery jar were then handed over by the club to the Antiquities and Monuments Office.
