= Route 4 (Hong Kong) =

Road in Hong Kong

Route 4
- Island Eastern Corridor, Central-Wan Chai Bypass, Connaught Road (West & Central)
- Alignment and exits of Route 4 (zoom in to view exit details)

Route information
- Maintained by Highways Department
- Length: 14.1 km (8.8 mi)
- Existed: 8 June 1984 (Island Eastern Corridor)–present

Major junctions
- East end: Chai Wan Road/Wan Tsui Road in Chai Wan
- Route 2 in Quarry Bay; Route 3 in Sai Ying Pun
- West end: Shing Sai Road in Kennedy Town

Location
- Country: China
- Special administrative region: Hong Kong
- Districts: Eastern, Wan Chai, Central and Western

Highway system
- Transport in Hong Kong; Routes; Roads and Streets
← Route 3	→ Route 5

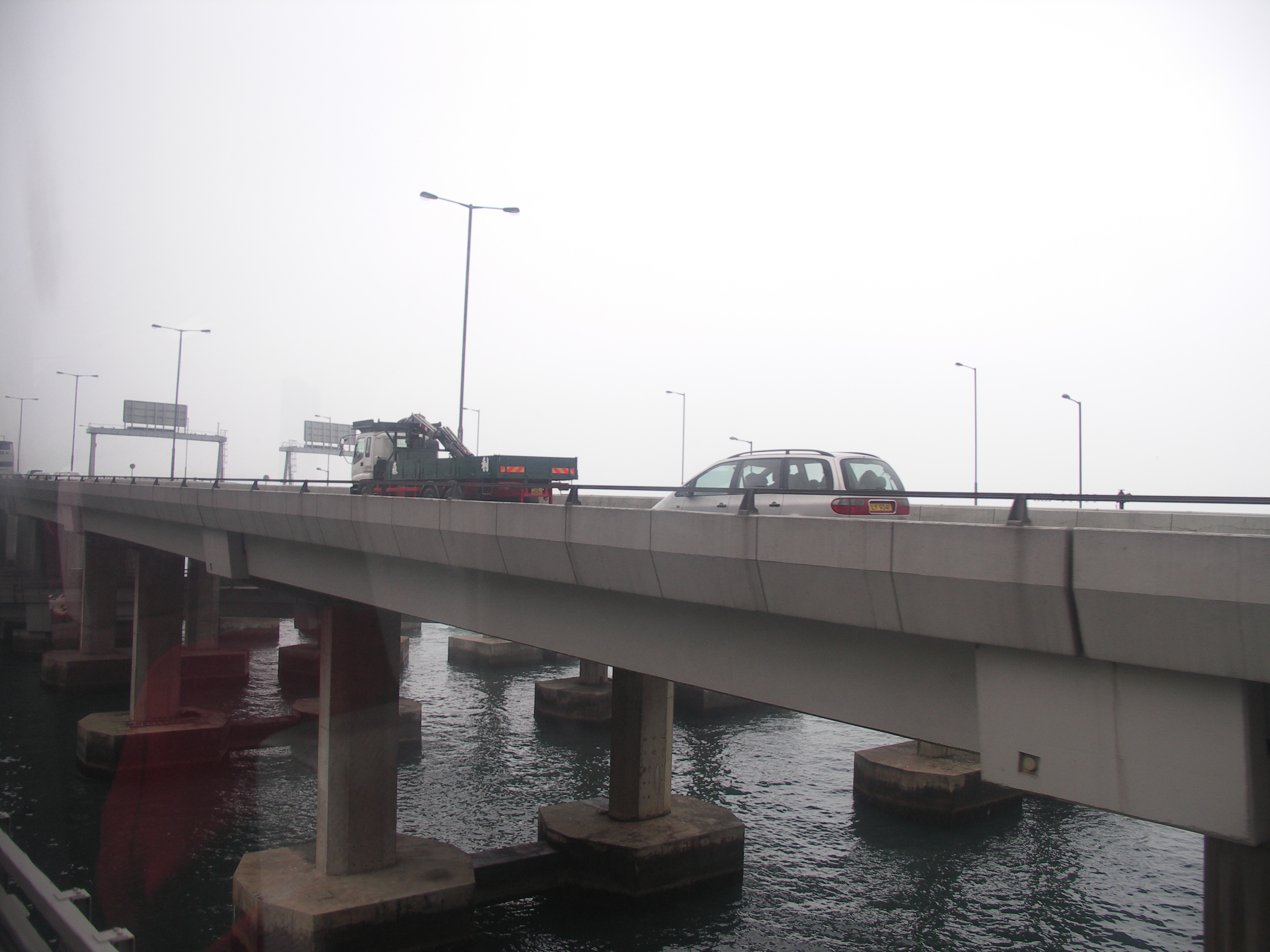
Island Eastern Corridor near North Point

Route 4 (Chinese: 四號幹綫; Jyutping: sei3 hou6 gon3 sin3) is an east-west road artery along the Hong Kong Island, Hong Kong. Formerly divided into routes 7 (Causeway Bay – Aberdeen) and 8 (Utilisation of Island Eastern Corridor), it was absorbed into Route 4 in 2004.

== Route ==
The current Route 4 could be divided into two sections:

From Chai Wan the route travels west towards Central via Island Eastern Corridor, Central–Wan Chai Bypass. Part two of the roadway extension, which took Route 4 from Connaught Road Central to Kennedy Town via the Connaught Road West Flyover (a.k.a. Rumsey Street Flyover), was completed in 1997.

The areas covered by the route include Kennedy Town, Shek Tong Tsui, Sai Ying Pun, Sheung Wan, Central, Wan Chai, Causeway Bay, Quarry Bay, Taikoo Shing, Shau Kei Wan, A Kung Ngam, Heng Fa Chuen and Chai Wan.

The section of Route 4 from Kennedy Town to Aberdeen was included in the proposal when construction commenced, but this section has yet to be built.

== Exits and Interchanges ==
District	Location	Road Name	km	mi	Exit	Destinations	Notes
Eastern	Chai Wan	Island Eastern Corridor	0.0	0.0	—	Chai Wan Road / Wan Tsui Road – Siu Sai Wan, Hing Wah Estate, Shau Kei Wan	Roundabout
Eastern	Chai Wan	Island Eastern Corridor	0.2	0.12	1A	Ning Foo Street to Lee Chung Street	Route 4 westbound exit only
Eastern	Chai Wan	Island Eastern Corridor	0.6	0.37	2	Shun Tai Road	To Route 4 eastbound only
Eastern	Chai Wan	Island Eastern Corridor	0.7	0.43	2	Pamela Youde Nethersole Eastern Hospital	From Route 4 westbound only
Eastern	Chai Wan	Island Eastern Corridor	1.0	0.62	2	Wing Tai Road – Heng Fa Chuen, Siu Sai Wan	To/from Route 4 westbound
Eastern	Heng Fa Chuen	Island Eastern Corridor	1.9	1.2	—	Shing Tai Road	To Route 4 westbound only
Eastern	Shau Kei Wan	Island Eastern Corridor	2.1	1.3	2A	Tung Hei Road – Aldrich Bay, A Kung Ngam	Northbound entrance only, southbound exit and entrance
Eastern	Shau Kei Wan	Island Eastern Corridor	2.9	1.8	2B	Tung Hei Road – Shau Kei Wan	From Route 4 westbound only
Eastern	Shau Kei Wan	Island Eastern Corridor	3.3–3.4	2.1–2.1	3A	Chai Wan Road – Shek O, Tai Tam and Stanley	To/from Route 4 westbound only
Eastern	Shau Kei Wan	Island Eastern Corridor	3.4	2.1	3B	Tung Hei Road – Shau Kei Wan, Aldrich Bay	To/from Route 4 westbound only
Eastern	Sai Wan Ho	Island Eastern Corridor	4.2–4.5	2.6–2.8	3C	Oi Shun Road / Tai Hong Street – Sai Wan Ho, Tai Koo Shing	To/from Route 4 westbound only
Eastern	Sai Wan Ho	Island Eastern Corridor	4.2–4.5	2.6–2.8	3C	Hong On Street – Kornhill	To/from Route 4 westbound only
Eastern	Quarry Bay	Island Eastern Corridor	4.6–5.5	2.9–3.4	4	Taikoo Wan Road – Tai Koo Shing	Directional-T interchange
Eastern	Quarry Bay	Island Eastern Corridor	4.9–5.5	3.0–3.4	5	Route 2 (Eastern Harbour Crossing) – East Kowloon	Directional-T interchange
Eastern	North Point	Island Eastern Corridor	5.8	3.6	6	Man Hong Street / Java Road – North Point	To/from Route 4 eastbound only
Eastern	North Point	Island Eastern Corridor	6.5	4.0	6	Java Road / King's Road – Quarry Bay	King's Road westbound to Route 4 westbound; Route 4 eastbound to Java Road
Eastern	North Point	Island Eastern Corridor	7.2	4.5	6A	Tong Shui Road – North Point	To/from Route 4 westbound only
Eastern	Fortress Hill	Island Eastern Corridor	7.5	4.7	6B	Island Eastern Corridor to Route 1 – Causeway Bay	To/from Route 4 eastbound only; Formerly part of Route 4
Wan Chai	Causeway Bay	Central–Wan Chai Bypass	9.2	5.7	—	Victoria Park Road	To Route 4 westbound only
Wan Chai	Wan Chai	Central–Wan Chai Bypass	9.9	6.2	7	Lung Wo Road – Wan Chai North and Causeway Bay	To/from Route 4 eastbound only
Central and Western	Central	Central–Wan Chai Bypass	11.6	7.2	8	Man Kat Street / Finance Street – Central	From Route 4 westbound only
Central and Western	Central	Central–Wan Chai Bypass	11.6	7.2	8	Man Chiu Street / Man Po Street	To/from Route 4 eastbound only
Central and Western	Sheung Wan	Rumsey Street Flyover	12.6	7.8	8A	Connaught Road West – Sai Ying Pun, Pok Fu Lam	To/from Route 4 eastbound only
Central and Western	Sai Ying Pun	Connaught Road West Flyover	12.9–13.8	8.0–8.6	9	Route 3 (Western Harbour Crossing) – West Kowloon	Directional-T interchange
Central and Western	Sai Ying Pun	Connaught Road West Flyover	13.8	8.6	—	Hill Road Flyover	To Route 4 eastbound only
Central and Western	Shek Tong Tsui	Connaught Road West Flyover	14.4	8.9	—	Shing Sai Road	To/from Route 4 eastbound only
