= Island Eastern Corridor =

Expressway in Eastern District, Hong Kong

Coordinates: 22.293547°N 114.199097°E

Island Eastern Corridor
- Part of Route 4
- IEC coloured red

Route information
- Maintained by Highways Department
- History: 1984 (Phase I); 1985 (Phase II); 1989 (Phase III)

Major junctions
- East end: Chai Wan
- West end: Causeway Bay, Central-Wan Chai Bypass

Location
- Country: China
- Special administrative region: Hong Kong
- Districts: Eastern, Wan Chai

Highway system
- Transport in Hong Kong; Routes; Roads and Streets

Island Eastern Corridor
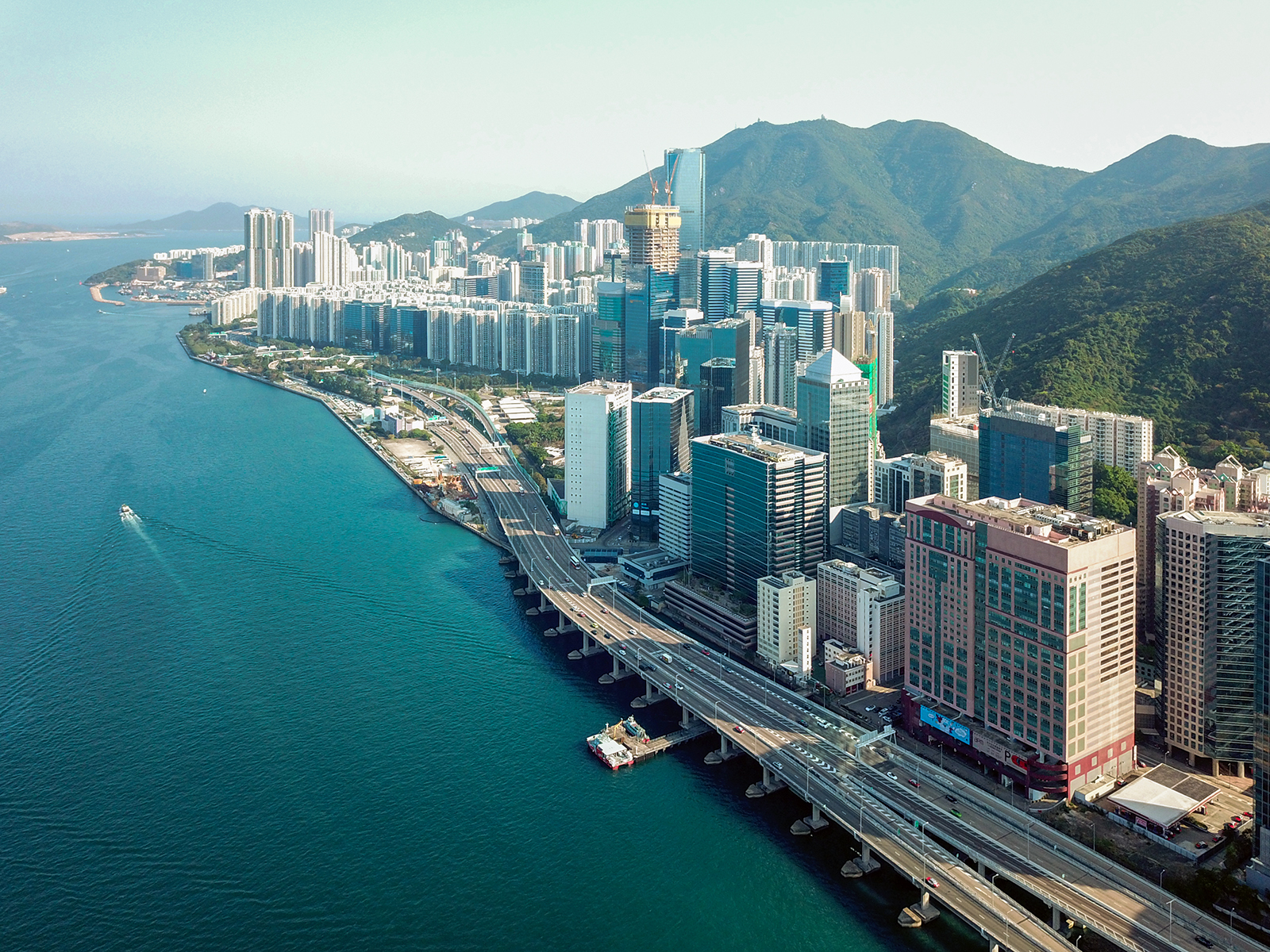
- Island Eastern Corridor along North Point and Quarry Bay in March 2018
- Traditional Chinese: 東區走廊
- Simplified Chinese: 东区走廊
Transcriptions
Standard Mandarin
- Hanyu Pinyin: Dōng Qū Zǒuláng
Yue: Cantonese
- Yale Romanization: dung1 keui1 jau2 long4

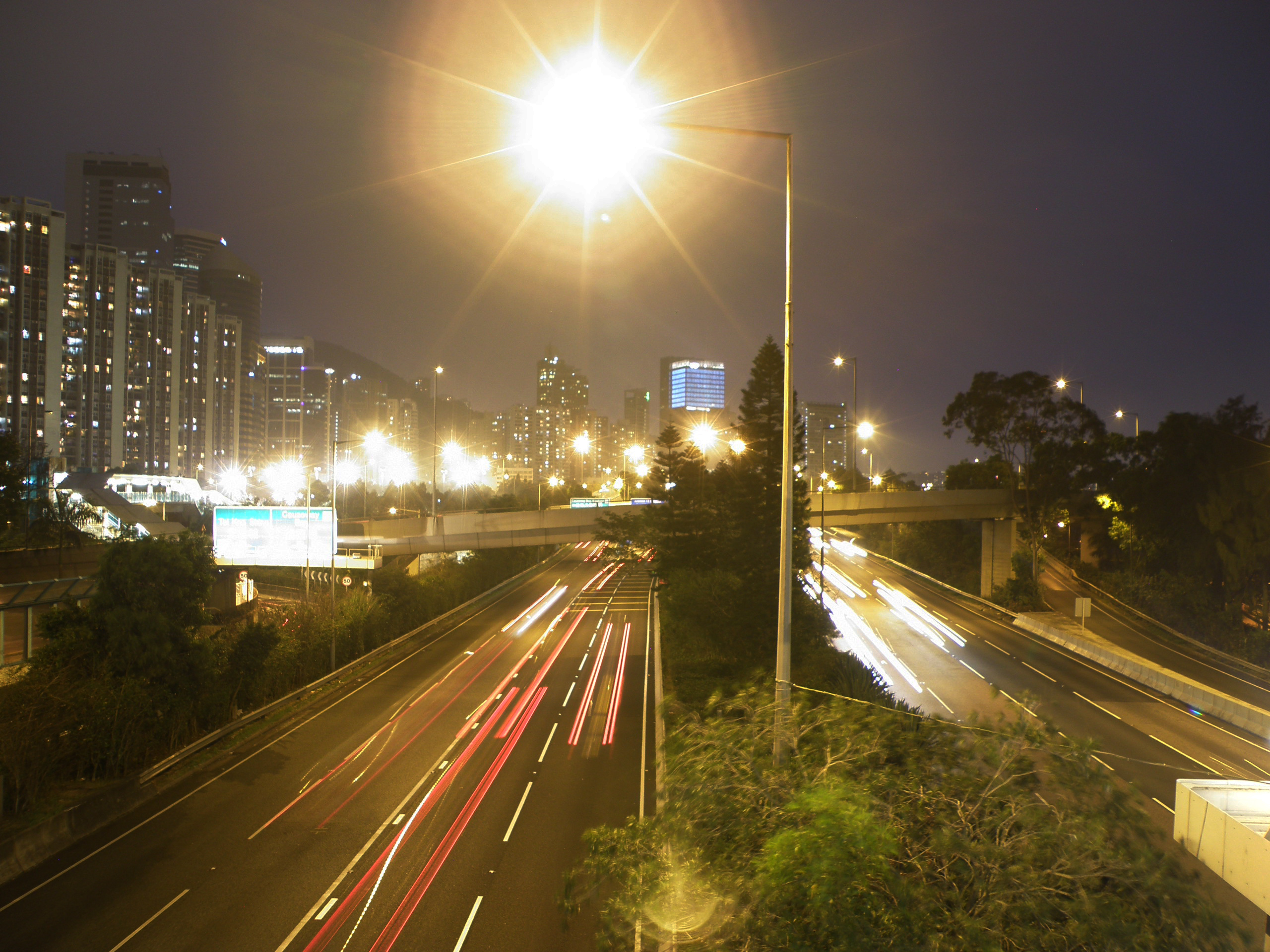
Island Eastern Corridor near Tai Koo Shing in February 2015

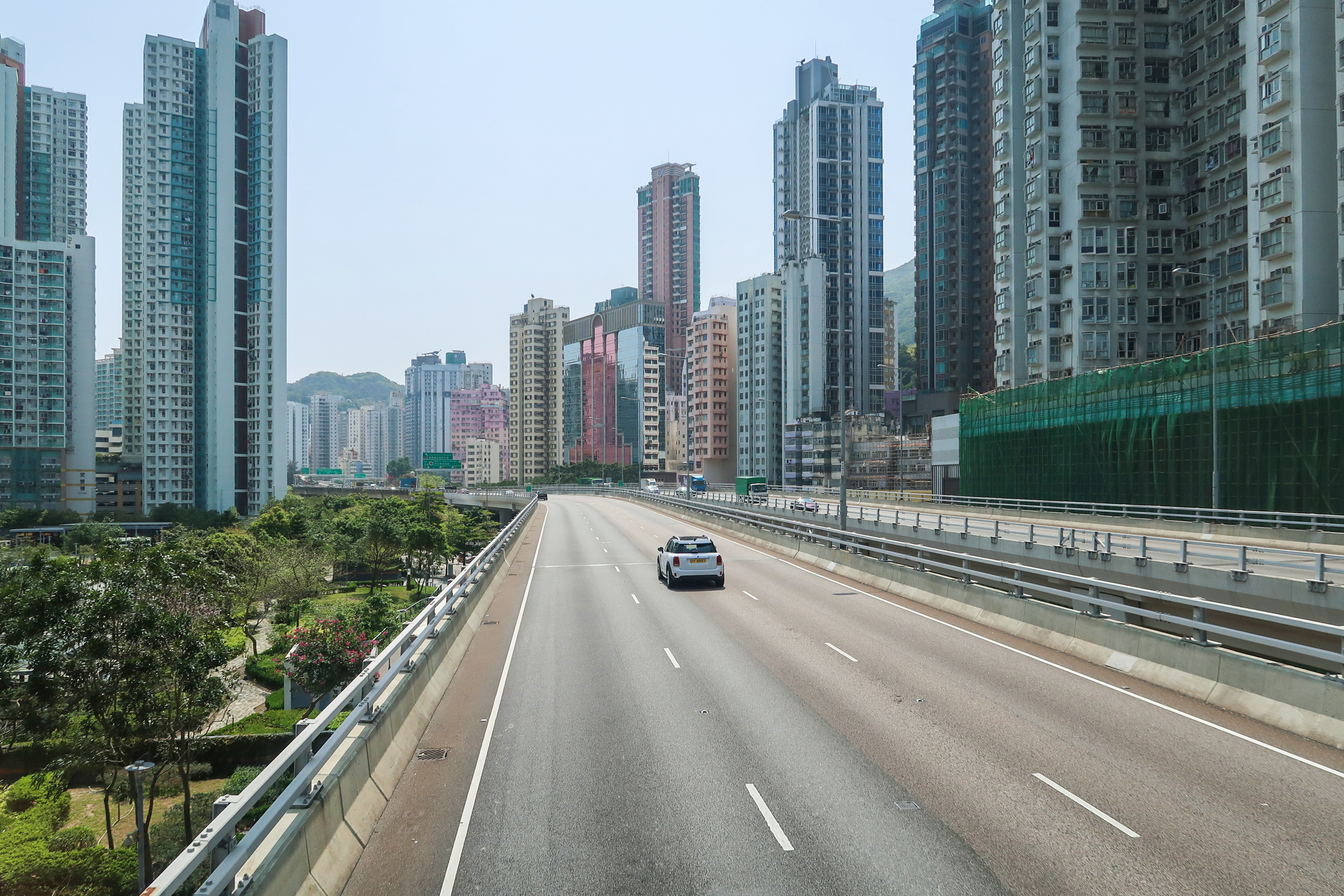
Island Eastern Corridor at Sai Wan Ho in March 2018

The Island Eastern Corridor (IEC) is an expressway built along the northeastern shore of Hong Kong Island in Hong Kong. It starts from Causeway Bay in the west and ends in Chai Wan in the east. It is mostly part of Route 4. The section between Causeway Bay and Quarry Bay consists mainly of viaducts built along Victoria Harbour.

== History ==
After World War II, the Eastern District of Hong Kong Island developed rapidly. As a result, the major thoroughfare in the area, King's Road, became very congested.

To relieve the issue of congestion, the idea of constructing an elevated vehicular corridor in the Eastern District was brought out in 1968, as part of the Hong Kong Long Term Road Study. The original plan was to construct an elevated dual carriageway above King's Road, which continues eastward as a ground-level road along the coastline between Sai Wan Ho and Chai Wan. Such alignment along King's Road was later discarded in favour of a waterfront viaduct running parallel to King's Road instead. It was not until 8 April 1981, 20 May 1982 and 5 August 1986 that construction commenced on the three sections of the corridor, respectively. The corridor was opened in three phases: Causeway Bay to Taikoo Shing on 8 June 1984; Taikoo Shing to Shau Kei Wan on 26 July 1985; and Shau Kei Wan to Chai Wan on 12 October 1989.

Work has been done to the expressway several times over its life, including the bridge diversions at Quarry Bay, completed in 2003, where Route 4 joins with Route 2. There is also a proposed extension of the Corridor into the hills of Chai Wan and Siu Sai Wan. The section of viaduct near City Garden has also been rebuilt and expanded so that it could become the eastern terminus of the Central–Wan Chai Bypass.

In 2008, the Island Eastern Corridor became the new venue of the Hong Kong Marathon 10 km race, held on 17 February 2008. The race track started from City Garden in North Point, and ran eastwards until Shau Kei Wan, where it made a U-turn, back along westbound IEC and ended at Victoria Park, near the western terminus of the IEC. The noise problem caused by the IEC's design became evident as residents complained about noises as high as 60 dB emitting at about five to six o'clock in the morning.

In February 2008, the Government announced that it will construct a waterfront promenade between Causeway Bay and Sai Wan Ho, with significant sections at North Point running under Island Eastern Corridor, using floating boards. However, the Government is concerned about the plan violating the Protection of the Harbour Ordinance, since the boards may need to extend seabound due to the lack of space. Further study will take place regarding the feasibility of the project. When it is finished, a continuous promenade will be formed between Central and Sai Wan Ho, together with recreational land use projects related to the Central–Wan Chai Bypass.

== Alignment ==
The corridor starts at Causeway Bay as a viaduct, where it joins Victoria Park Road and Gloucester Road with a ramp. It then heads east along the coast of North Point, still a viaduct until it comes to Quarry Bay where it descends onto ground level, and interchanges with the approach road of Eastern Harbour Crossing. After passing Taikoo Shing, the corridor becomes a viaduct again, now crossing between Sai Wan Ho and Aldrich Bay, making a broad curve toward the Hong Kong Museum of Coastal Defence, where it returns to ground level and runs past A Kung Ngam and Heng Fa Chuen all the way towards Chai Wan. It ends near Chai Wan Park, at a large roundabout with Chai Wan Road and Wan Tsui Road in Chai Wan, just next to MTR Chai Wan station.

The full length of the corridor, save for a small section in Chai Wan between its eastern terminus and Wing Tai Road, is a statutorily-designated expressway (under section 123(1) of the Road Traffic Ordinance, Cap. 374, Laws of Hong Kong). Speed limit for the expressway portion of IEC is 70 km/h.

== Criticism ==
It is often criticised for using up the seafront which could have been enjoyed by residents of Hong Kong had alternative alignments been chosen. Residents have also complained about traffic noises owing to some sections' proximity to residential buildings, and it could be advised that there would have to be sound barriers installed along this section. It has been suggested that the Watson Road – Tin Chiu Street section of the corridor be replaced with a tunnel, but was never considered due to the complex nature of the necessary works.

== Junctions along the Corridor ==
Eastern Corridor
Westbound	Exit Number	Eastbound
Connection to Chai Wan Road Roundabout Start of Route 4
Start of Eastern Corridor		End of Eastern Corridor
Chai Wan Station; Lee Chung Street	1A	No exit
Pamela Youde Nethersole Eastern Hospital	2	Heng Fa Chuen, Siu Sai Wan; Wing Tai Road
Aldrich Bay, A Kung Ngam; Tung Hei Road	2A	No exit
Shau Kei Wan; Tung Hei Road	2B	No exit
No exit	3A	Shek O, Stanley; Chai Wan Road
No exit	3B	Shau Kei Wan, Adrich Bay; Nam On Street, Nam On Lane
No exit	3C	Kornhill; Hong On Street
No exit	3C	Sai Wan Ho, Taikoo Shing; Tai Hong Street, Oi Shun Road
Taikoo Shing; Taikoo Shing Road	4	Taikoo Shing; Taikoo Shing Road
Kowloon (East); Eastern Harbour Crossing	5	Kowloon (East); Eastern Harbour Crossing
North Point; Man Hong Street	6	Quarry Bay; Java Road
No exit	6A	North Point; Tong Shui Road
Causeway Bay, Happy Valley, Wan Chai, Kowloon (Central); Eastern Corridor (Non-highway Section)	6B	No exit
Connection to Central–Wan Chai Bypass
Causeway Bay; Hing Fat Street	No exit	
End of Eastern Corridor		Start of Eastern Corridor
Connection to Victoria Park Road

== See also ==
- List of expressways in Hong Kong

Preceded by Eastern Terminus	Hong Kong Route 4 Island Eastern Corridor	Succeeded by Central–Wan Chai Bypass
