= Noonday Gun =

Time signal gun in Hong Kong

Coordinates: 22°16′57″N 114°11′02″E

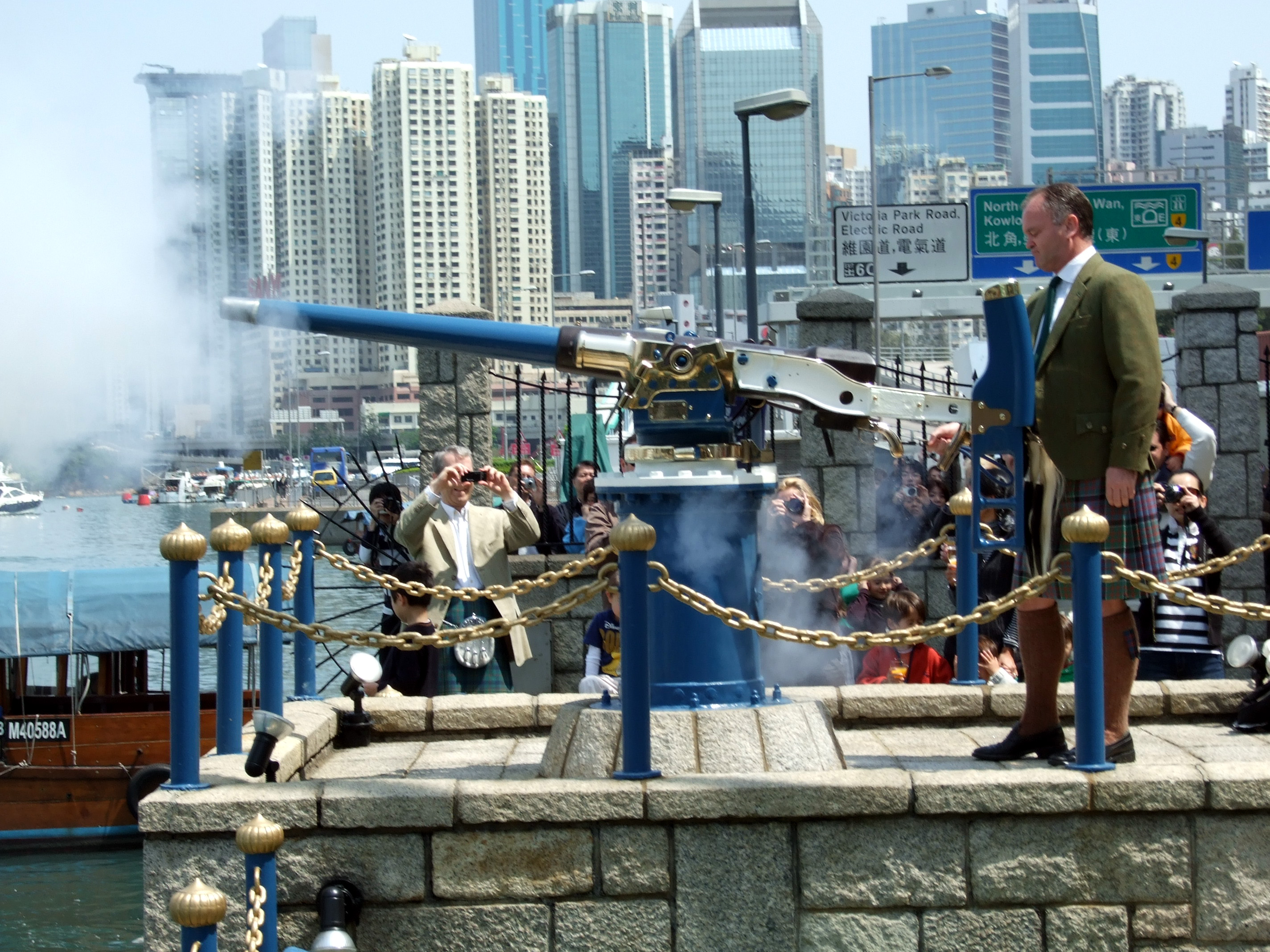
Firing of the Noonday Gun

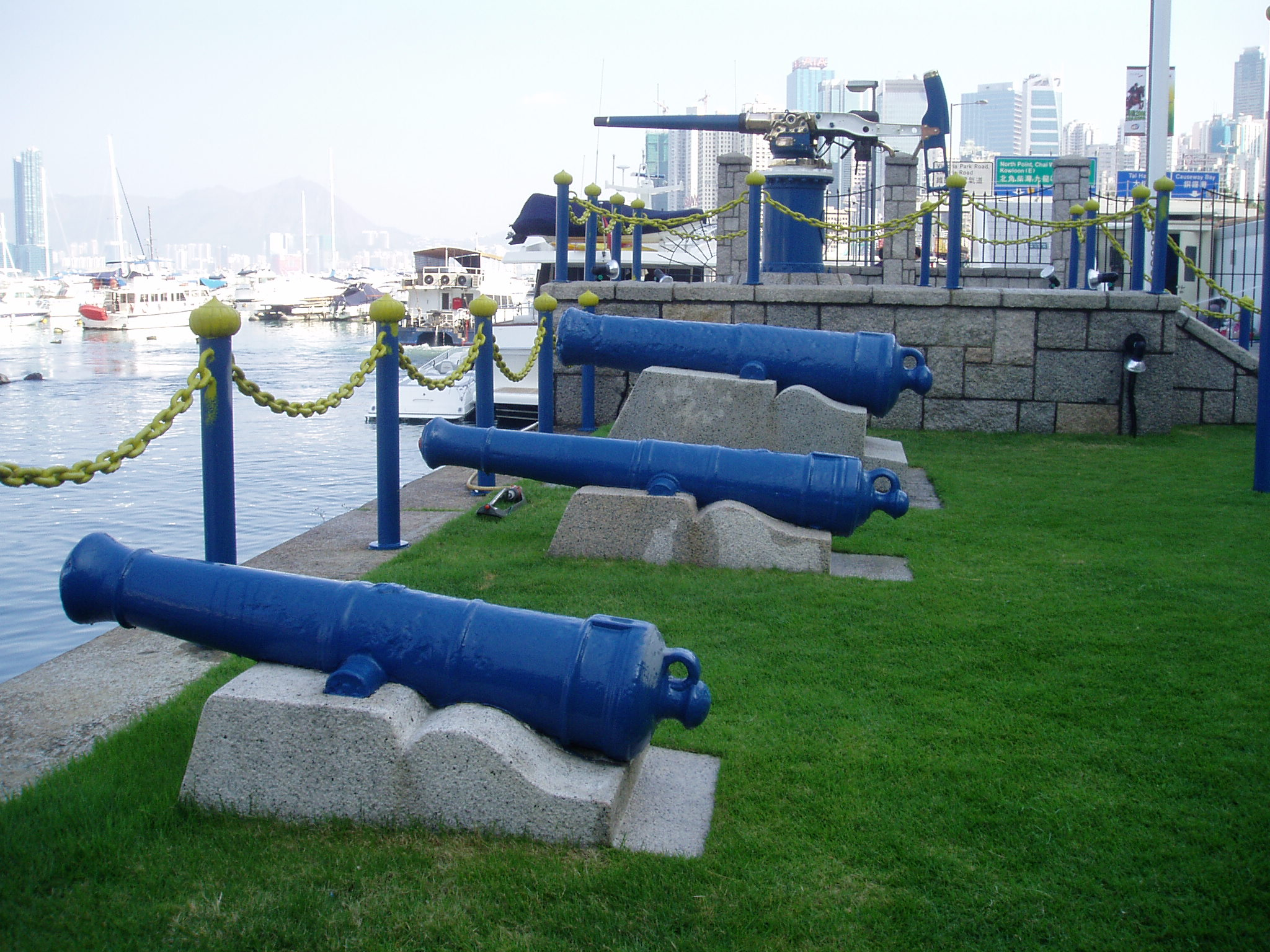
The Noonday Gun in the background, facing Causeway Bay Typhoon Shelter

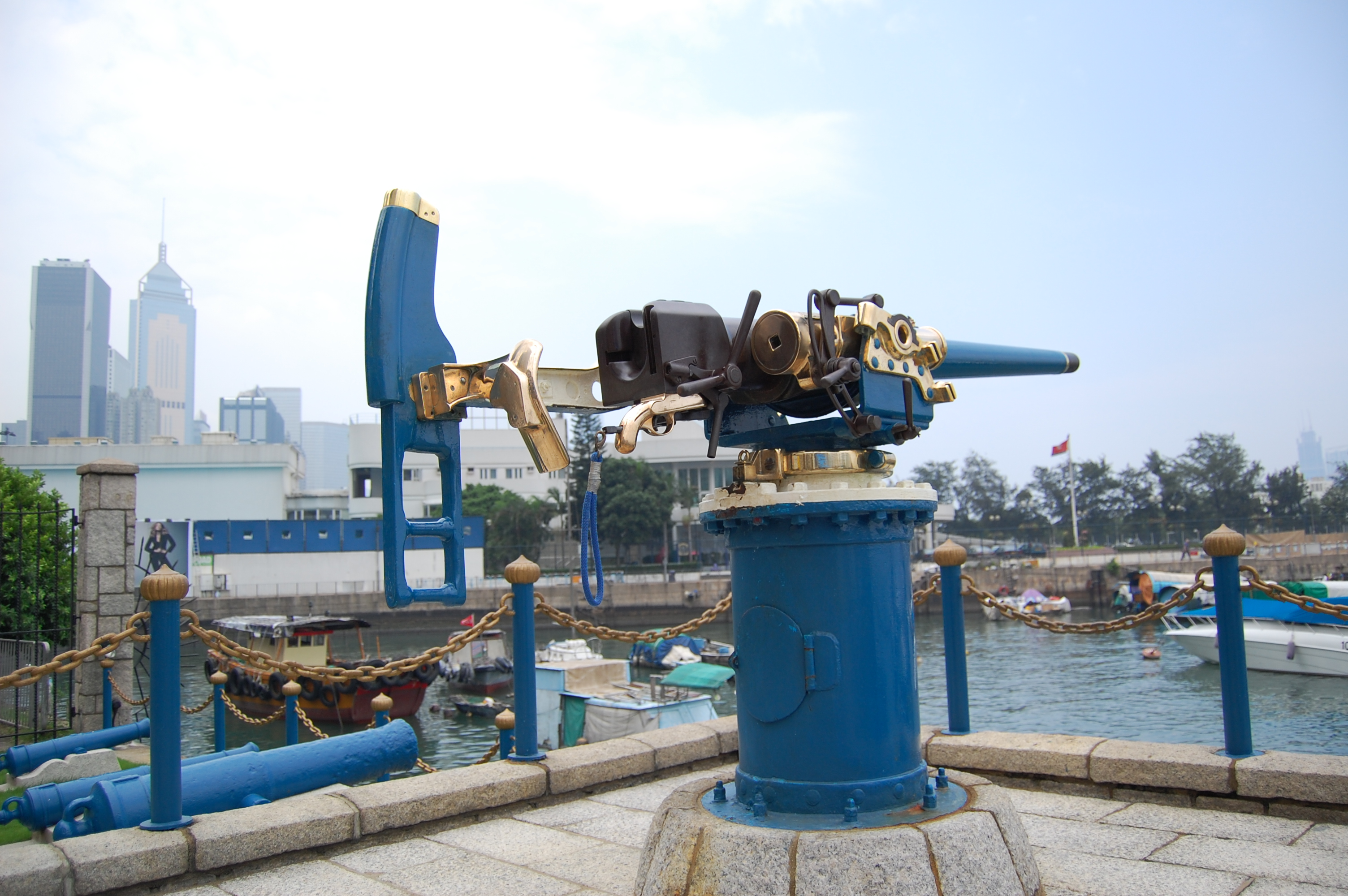
The Noonday Gun

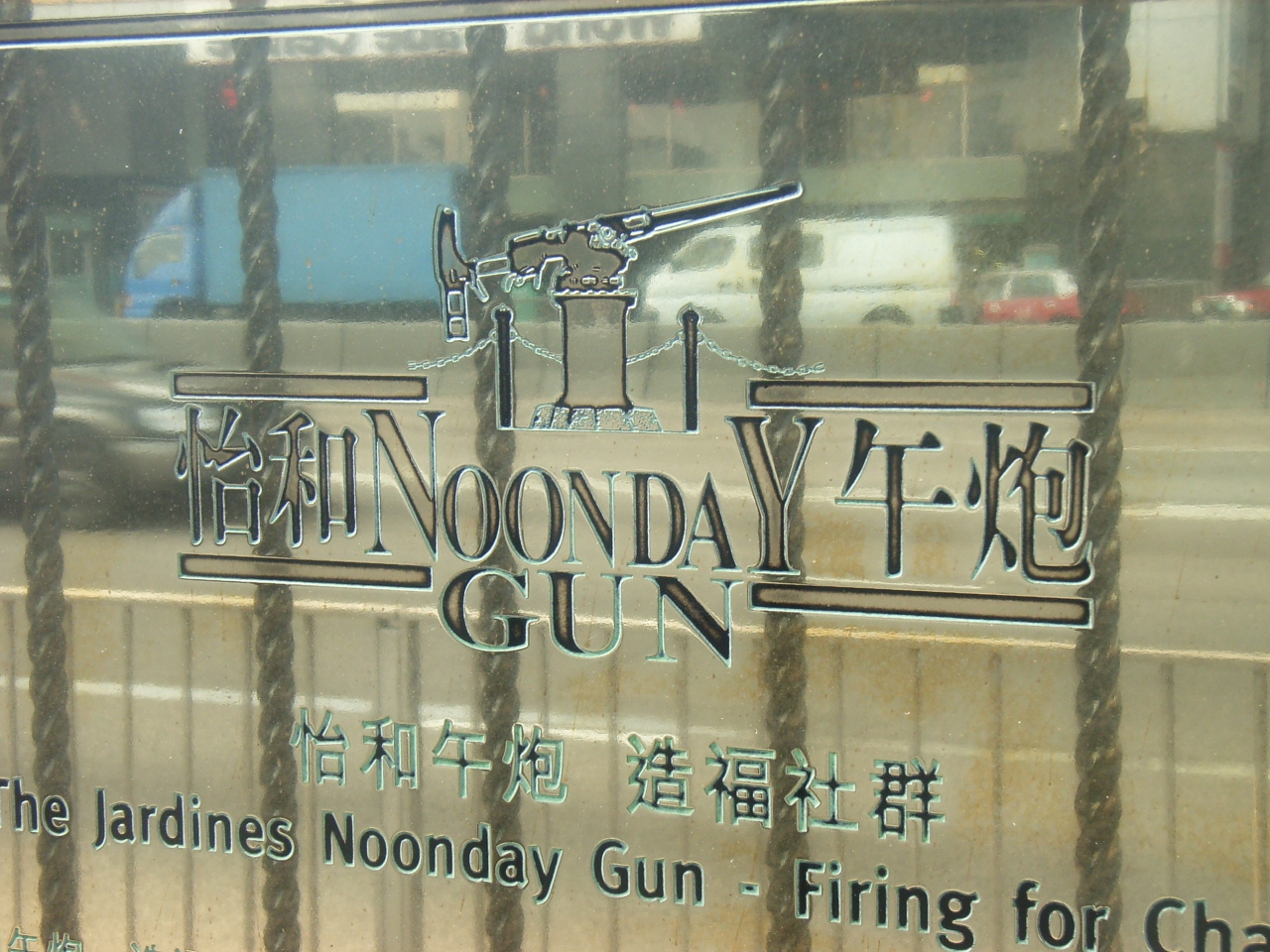
References are made to Jardines on the gun's descriptory plaque

The Noonday Gun (Chinese: 午炮) is a former naval artillery piece mounted on a small enclosed site near the Causeway Bay Typhoon Shelter on Hong Kong Island, Hong Kong. Owned and operated by Jardine Matheson, the gun is fired every day at noon and has become a tourist attraction.

== Origin ==
The Noonday Gun is located on the waterfront of the area formerly known as East Point, present-day Causeway Bay. East Point was the first plot of land in Hong Kong to be sold by the colonial government by public auction in 1841, and was purchased by Jardine Matheson. Over the years, land reclamation has shifted the coastline northward, and the siting of the gun has changed accordingly. The name East Point is now disused.

The tradition originated over an incident in the 1860s. Jardines' main godowns and offices were located at East Point, and its private militia would fire a gun salute to welcome a Jardine tai-pan's arrival by sea. On one occasion, a senior British naval officer became annoyed by this practice because he was new to Hong Kong and did not know of such a tradition. This was because such a salute was normally reserved for government officials and senior officers of the armed services. As a result, Jardines was ordered, as a penalty, to fire a gun every day at noon, in perpetuity.

In 1941, during the Japanese occupation of Hong Kong, the Japanese Imperial Army dismantled the gun and it was lost. After British forces regained Hong Kong in 1945, the Royal Navy provided Jardines with a new six-pound gun with which to continue the tradition of the noonday gun. On 1 July 1947, the Noonday gun was back in operation. Following complaints that the gun was too loud, in 1961 the marine police replaced the six-pound gun with a Hotchkiss three-pounder that saw action in the Battle of Jutland during the First World War.

== Tourist attraction ==
Although British rule ended in Hong Kong in 1997, the tradition of the noonday gun is continued by Jardine Matheson. A small crowd will gather for this daily event. Other than noon, the gun is also fired by a Jardines official at midnight every New Year's Day to celebrate the new year. At the daily firing event, a Jardines' guard marches up to the site in uniform. The guard rings a bell to signal the end of the fore-noon watch, a practice which dates from the time when Jardines' main offices and warehouses were located at East Point. Then, the guard marches up to the Noonday Gun and fires it, after which he rings the bell again, locks the chain blocking access to the gun and goes off. It is accessed by a tunnel passing under Gloucester Road from the basement car park in The Excelsior hotel, which is operated by Mandarin Oriental Hotel Group, a Jardines subsidiary. In March 2019, the Excelsior hotel was closed and slated for demolition, with plans for it to be replaced by an office building.

For a donation of HK$48,000 to the Community Chest charity, anyone can arrange to pull the lanyard that fires the gun.

== In popular culture ==
The firing of the gun was famously mentioned in Noël Coward's humorous song "Mad Dogs and Englishmen".

In Hong Kong, they strike a gong, and fire off a noonday gun
To reprimand each inmate who's in late.

== See also ==
- Noon Gun: Signal Hill, Cape Town, South Africa
- One O'Clock Gun: Edinburgh Castle, Edinburgh, Scotland.
