= Central–Wan Chai Bypass =

Road in Hong Kong

Central–Wan Chai Bypass
- Part of Route 4
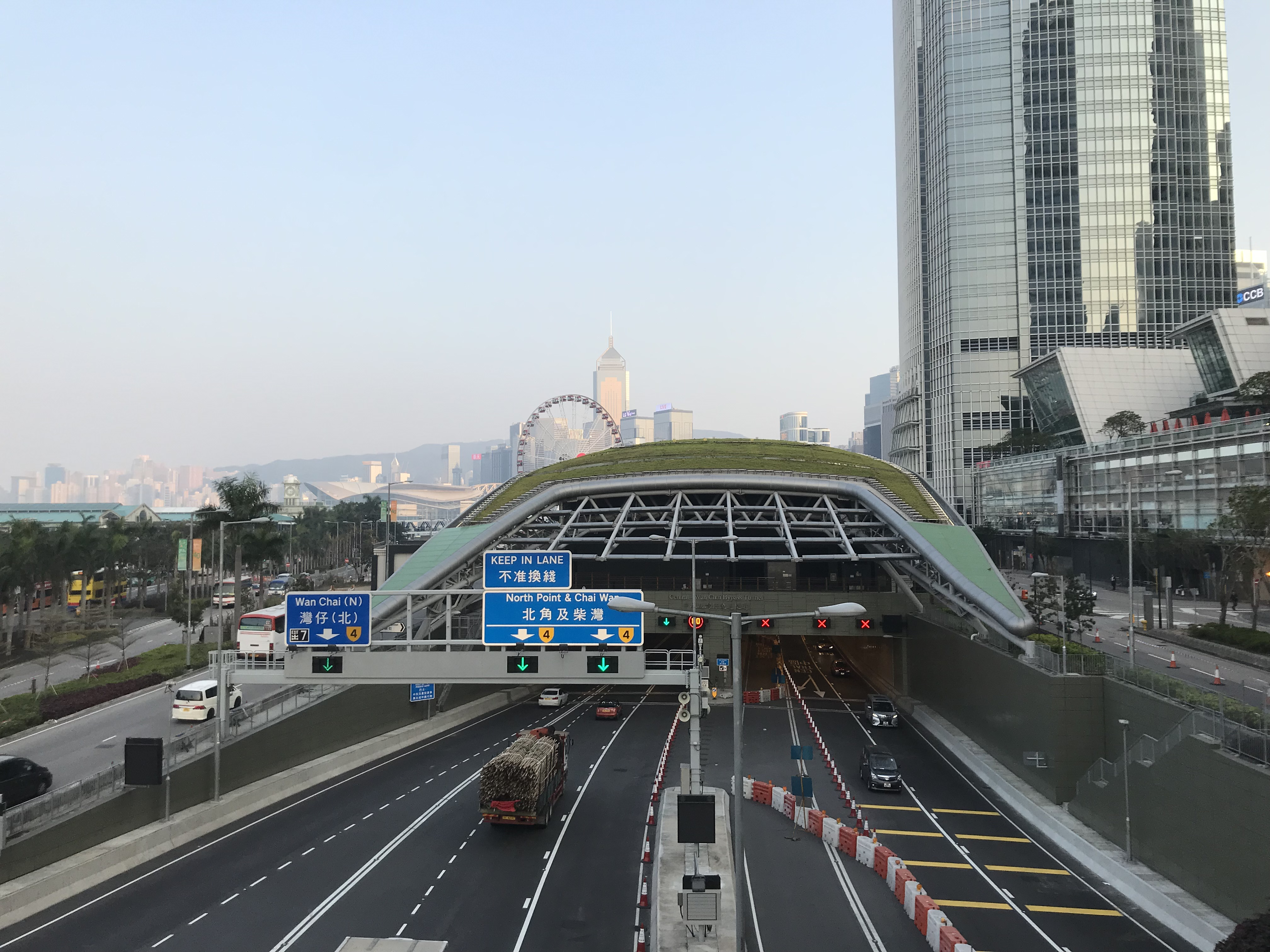
- Tunnel portal in Central (January 2019)

Route information
- Maintained by Highways Department
- Length: 4 km (2.5 mi)

Major junctions
- East end: Fortress Hill
- West end: Sheung Wan

Location
- Country: China
- Special administrative region: Hong Kong
- Districts: Eastern, Wan Chai, Central and Western

Highway system
- Transport in Hong Kong; Routes; Roads and Streets

Central–Wan Chai Bypass
- Traditional Chinese: 中環及灣仔繞道
- Simplified Chinese: 中环及湾仔绕道
Transcriptions
Standard Mandarin
- Hanyu Pinyin: Zhōnghuán jí Wān Zǎi Ràodào
Yue: Cantonese
- Jyutping: Zung1 waan4 kap6 waan1 zai2 jiu2 dou4

The Central–Wan Chai Bypass is a four-kilometre (2.5 mi) trunk road running between Sheung Wan and Fortress Hill on Hong Kong Island. The original design consists of a 2.3 km dual three-lane tunnel running under new reclamation areas provided by the Central and Wan Chai Reclamation project, and also connections to Connaught Road West flyover and Island Eastern Corridor. It substitutes Connaught Road Central, Harcourt Road, Gloucester Road and Victoria Park Road to be part of Route 4.

The bypass opened to traffic on 20 January 2019.

== History ==
The project, originally estimated to cost HK$28 billion, was approved by the Legislative Council finance committee in 2009, following a "decade of objections and legal challenges" from environmentalists and citizens concerned by further reclamation of Victoria Harbour. An Environmental Permit was issued under the Environmental Impact Assessment Ordinance and construction began the same year.

Lawmakers were "shocked" in 2013 by cost overruns. The Transport and Housing Bureau requested HK$8 billion in extra funding, bringing the total bill to HK$36 billion. Gary Fan, a member of LegCo's transport panel, asked: "Did the government deliberately underestimate the cost in order to get Legco to pass it?" The government bureau blamed unforeseen geotechnical difficulties as well as fluctuating labour and materials costs for the 28 per cent budget increase.

On 15 September 2015, the Director of Highways announced that the Central–Wan Chai Bypass would not open in 2017 as previously anticipated. He blamed a large metal object (probably a sunken ship) that was found on the seabed at the reclamation site in Wan Chai. As a result of the discovery, reclamation works were suspended for some time.

The first phase of the project opened on 20 January 2019 with the entire project becoming operational on 24 February that year.

== Alignment ==
The bypass starts from Rumsey Street Flyover at Sheung Wan. It enters a tunnel outside the International Finance Centre in Central, then heads east past the Tamar site in Admiralty with an interchange at Wan Chai. It continues to head east under the proposed reclamation areas of Wan Chai, Causeway Bay and Tin Hau.

The original design to have the bypass via Causeway Bay Typhoon Shelter leave the tunnel and connect with Island Eastern Corridor at Fortress Hill was amended so that the bypass would now emerge from the tunnel between the IEC carriageways, merging with them near Oil Street, Fortress Hill.

== Tunnel ventilation ==
Ventilation is an indispensable part for the operation of the tunnel as it will supply fresh air to maintain good air-quality environment to the commuters inside the tunnel while discharge vitiated air in a controlled manner at pre-determined suitable locations of exhaust. The tunnel ventilation system is also required to remove smoke in case of tunnel fire incidents. It is proposed to have three ventilation buildings sited near the western end, mid-length and eastern end of the Bypass to achieve the three objectives of supplying fresh air, extracting vitiated air and removing smoke during fire.

To achieve an energy efficient ventilation system by shortening the air extraction path, the location of proposed East Ventilation Building (EVB) needs to be as close to the tunnel portal as possible.

== Gallery ==
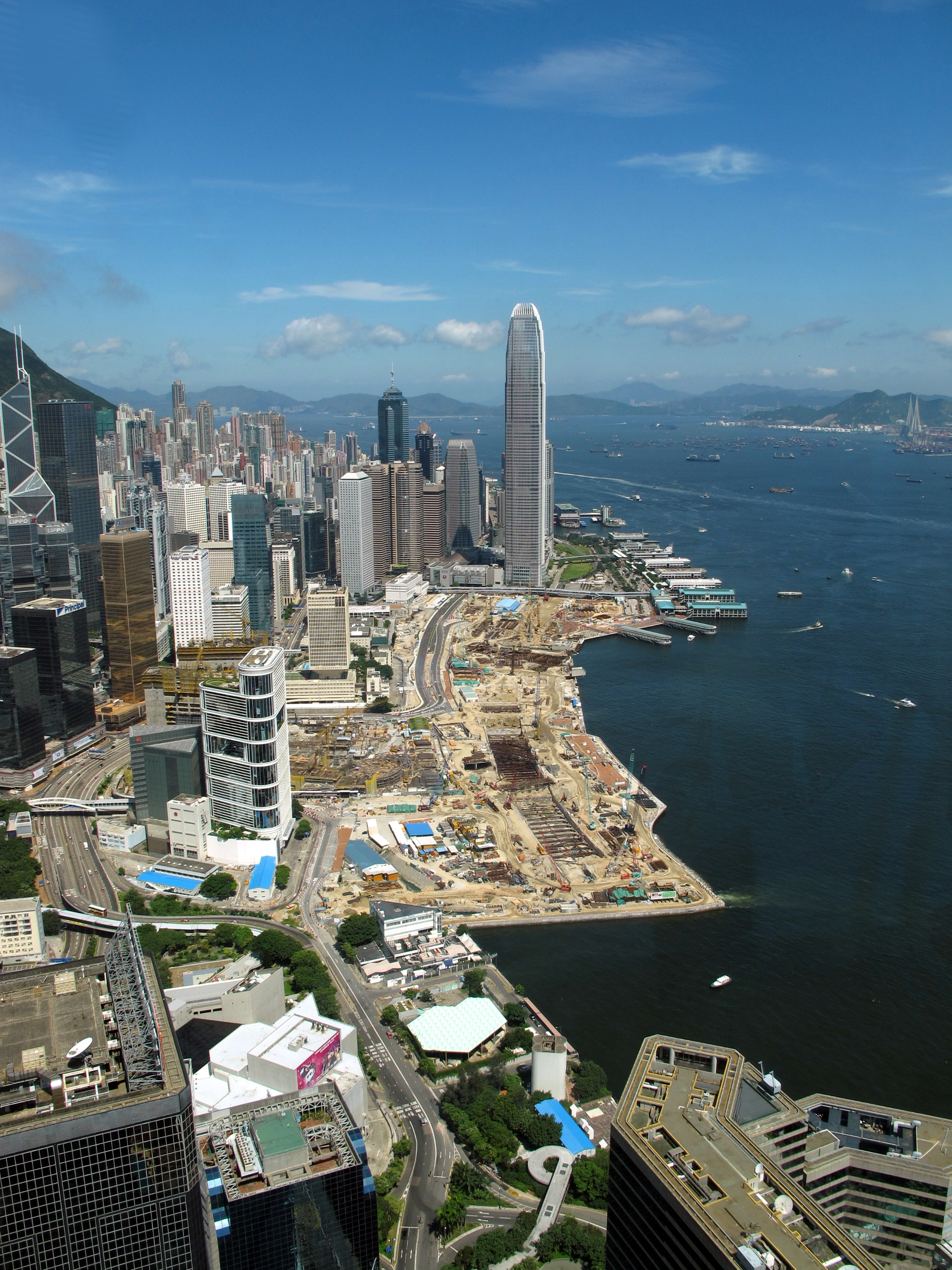
Construction site in 2010, looking west from Wan Chai.

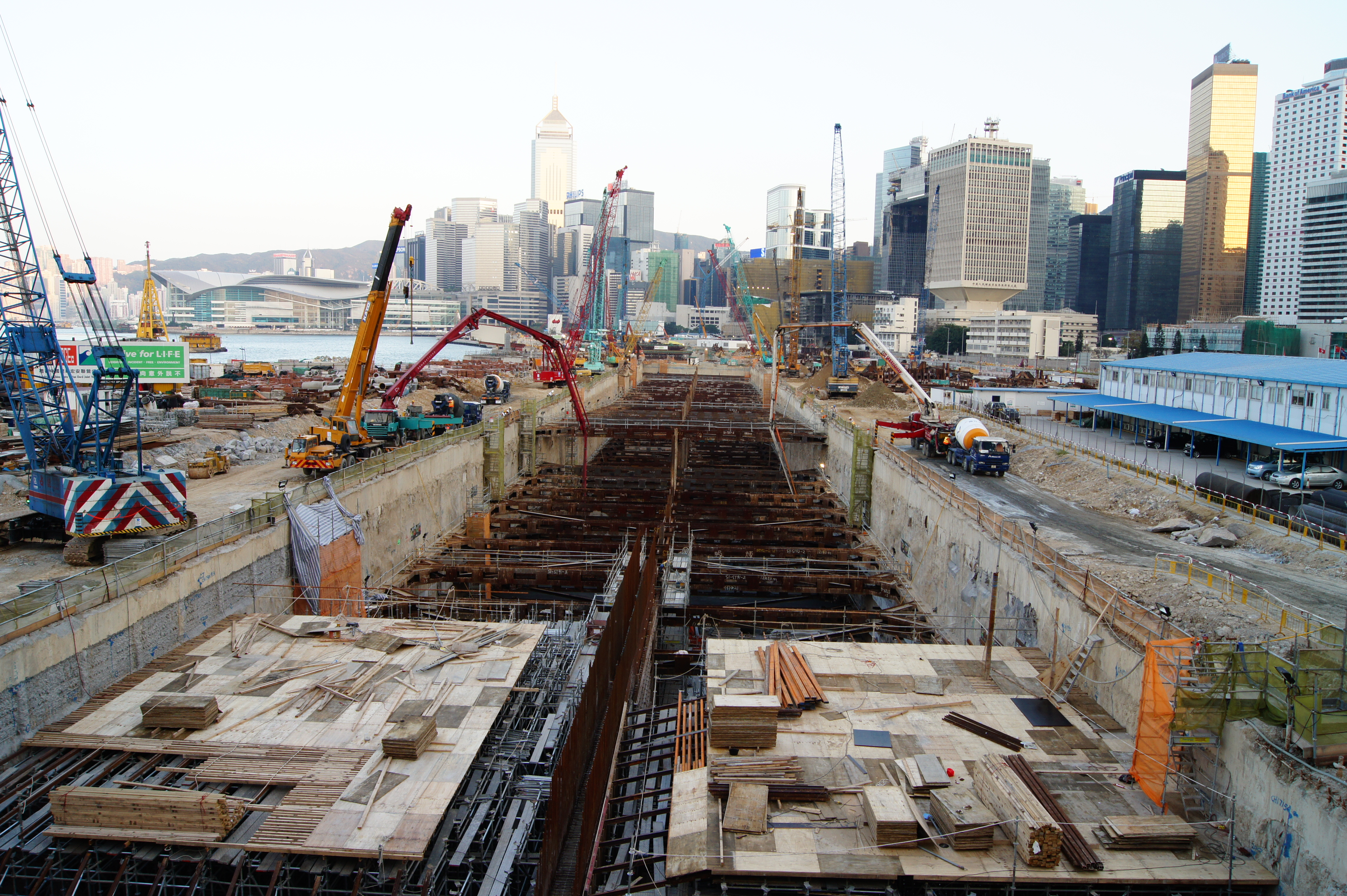
Construction site in 2011, looking east from the footbridge outside IFC.

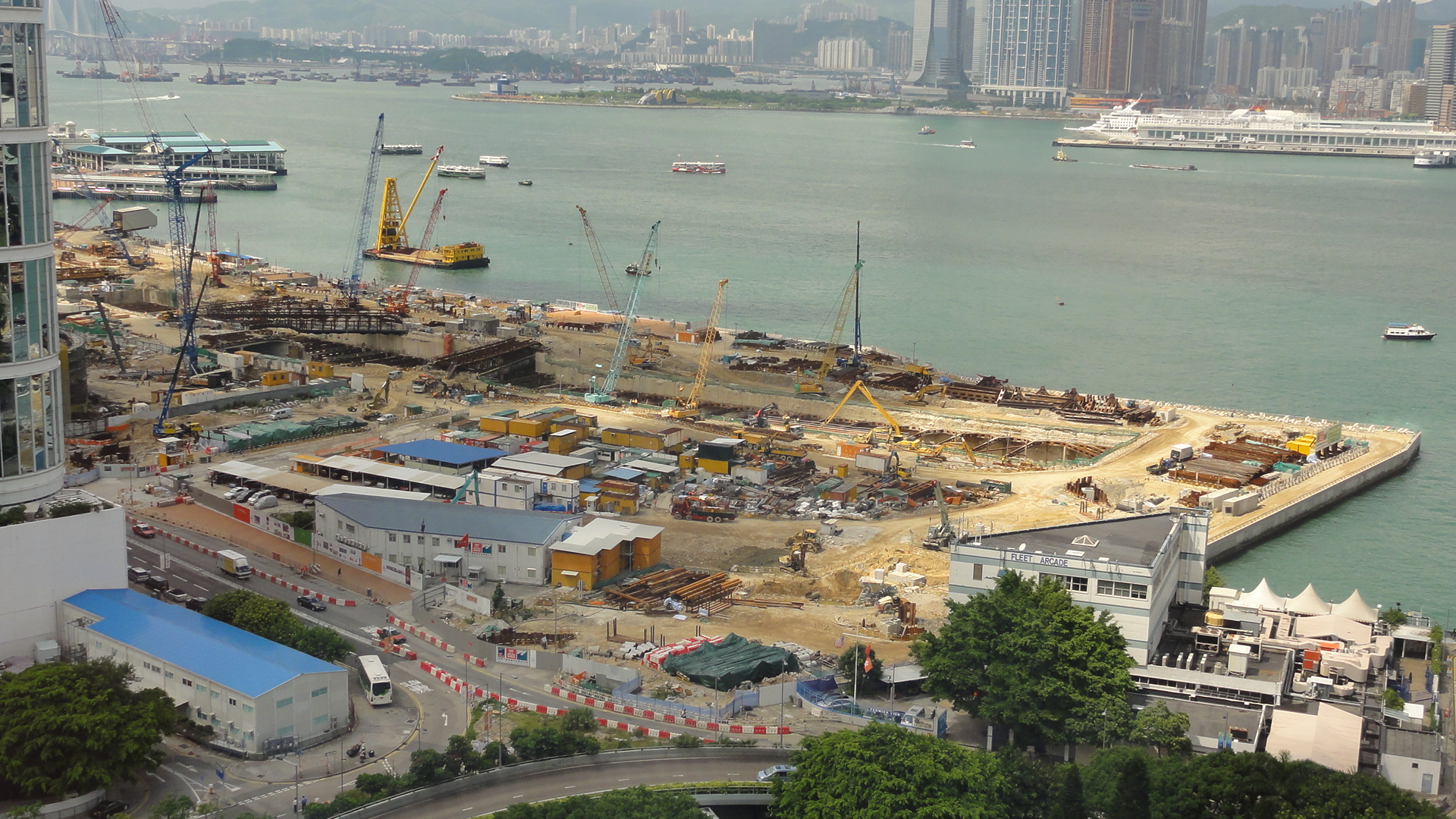
Admiralty section construction site.

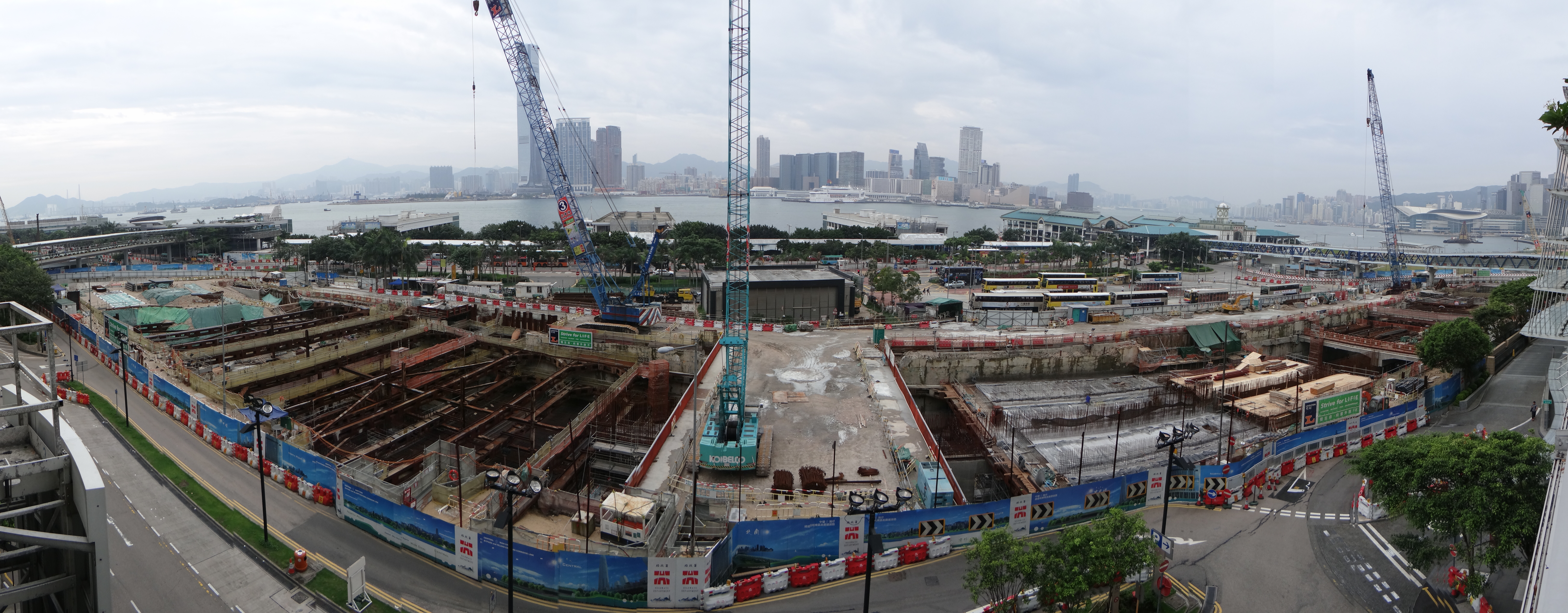
Central section construction site.

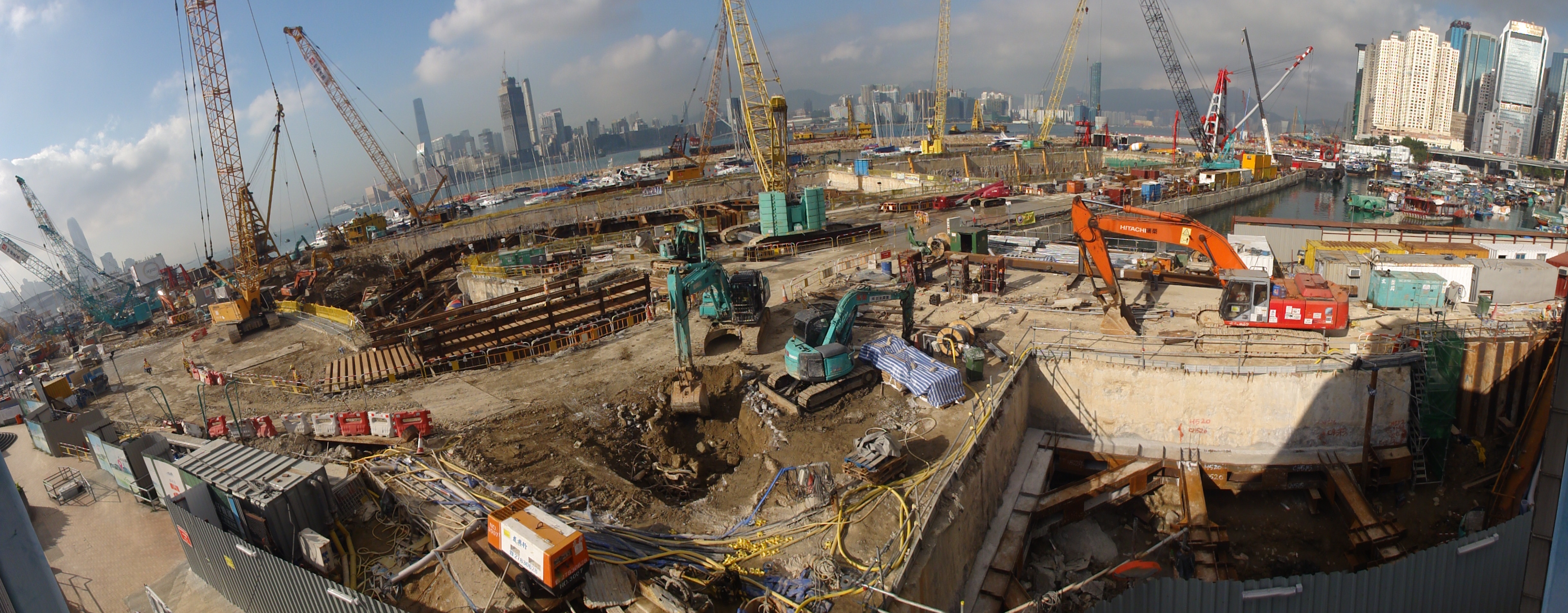
Causeway Bay section construction site.

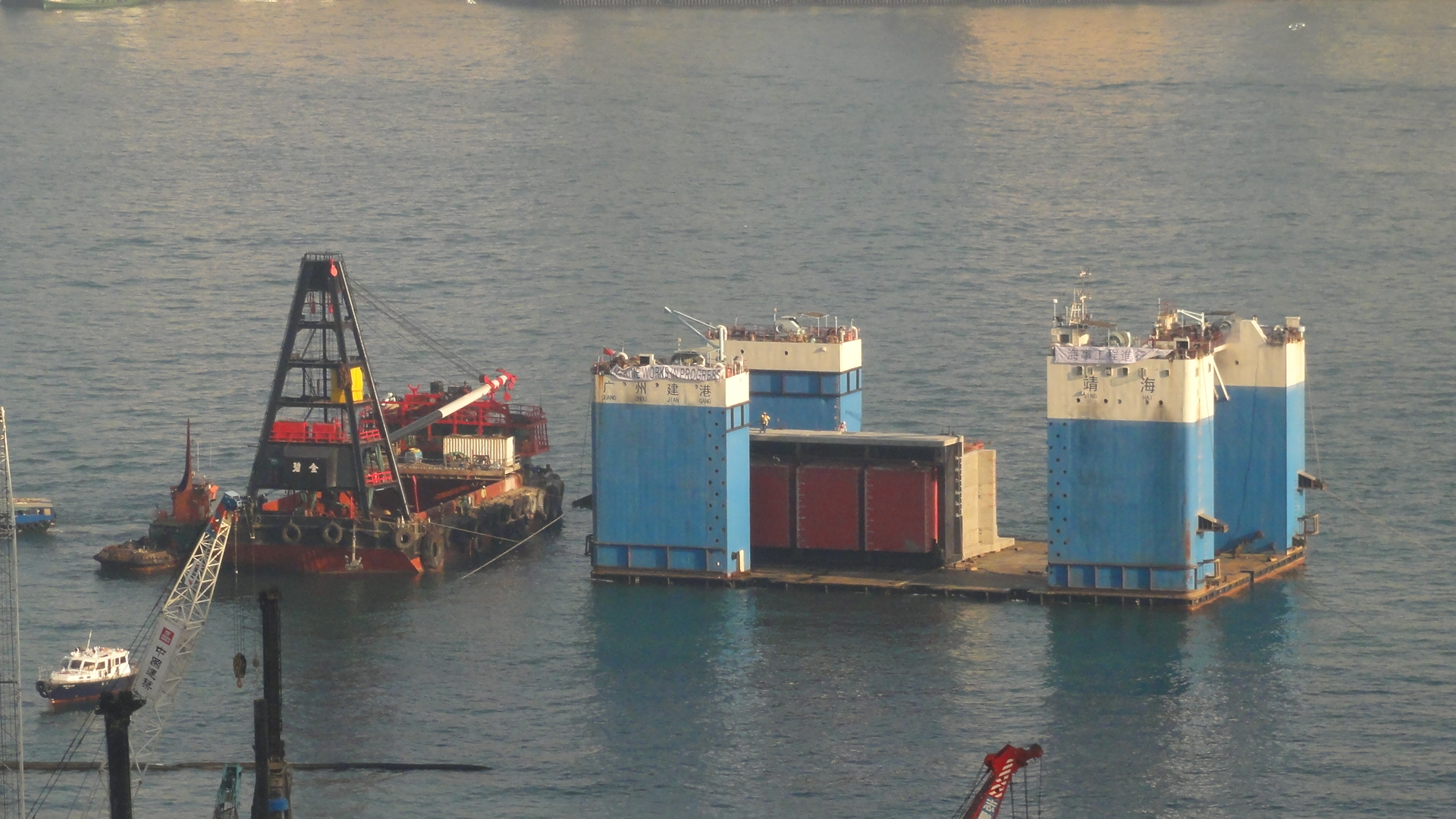
Semi-submersible ship used to install large precast unit.

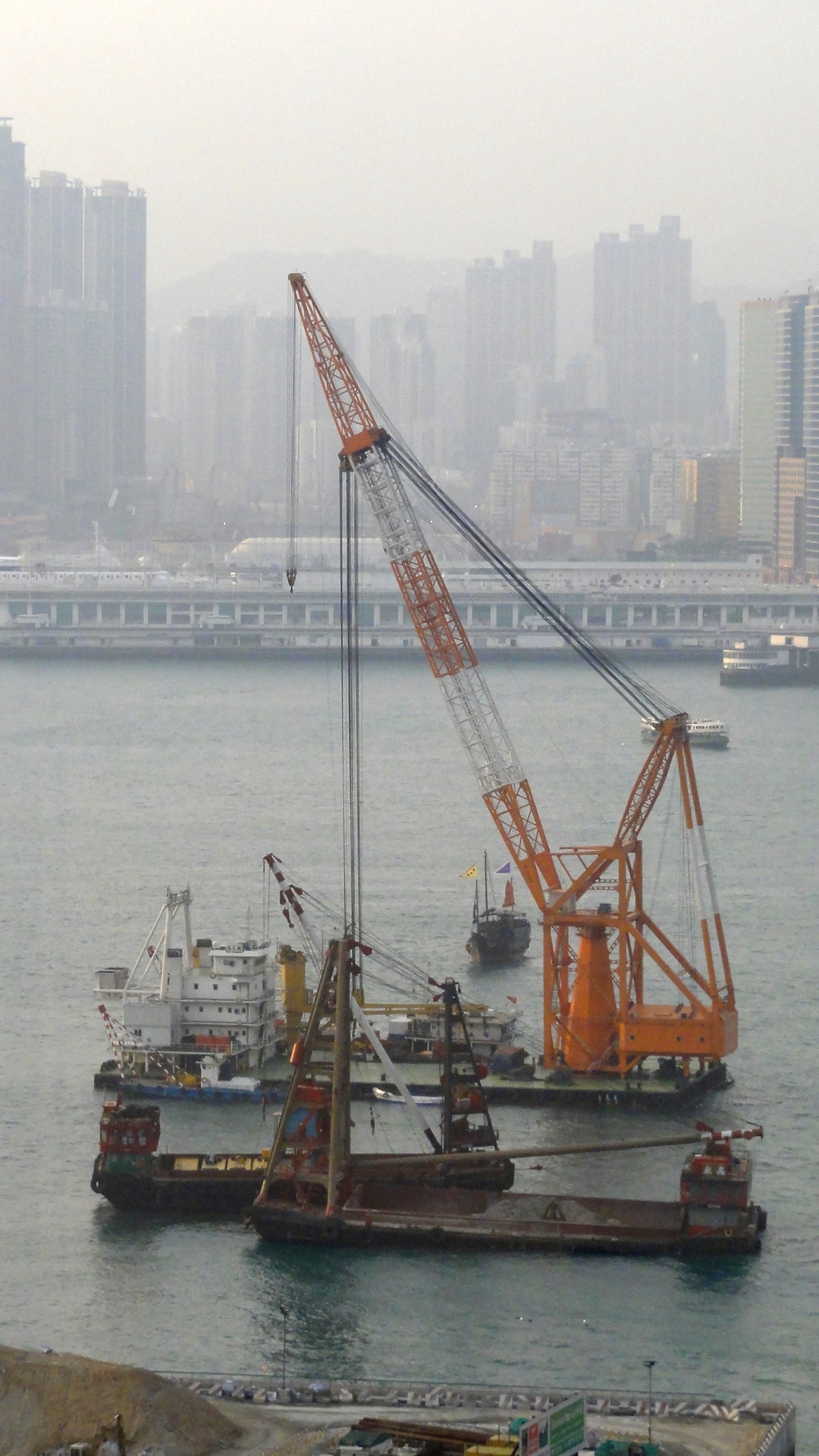
Heavy crane ship use in the construction.

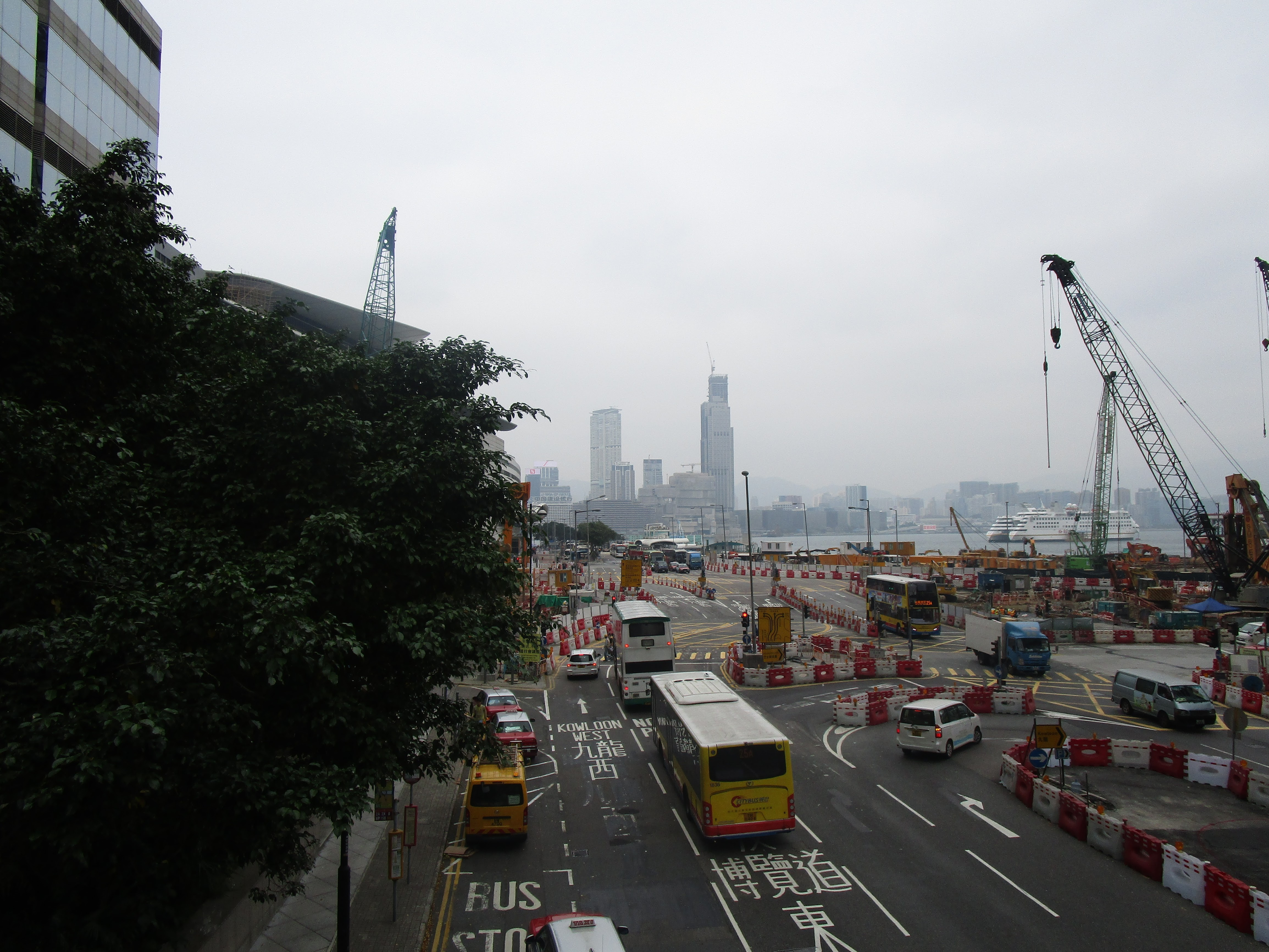
Construction works, as seen from Fleming Road in 2017.

== See also ==
- Central and Wan Chai Reclamation

Preceded by Island Eastern Corridor	Hong Kong Route 4 Central–Wan Chai Bypass	Succeeded by Connaught Road West
