= Citybus Route 8 =

Bus route in Hong Kong

8
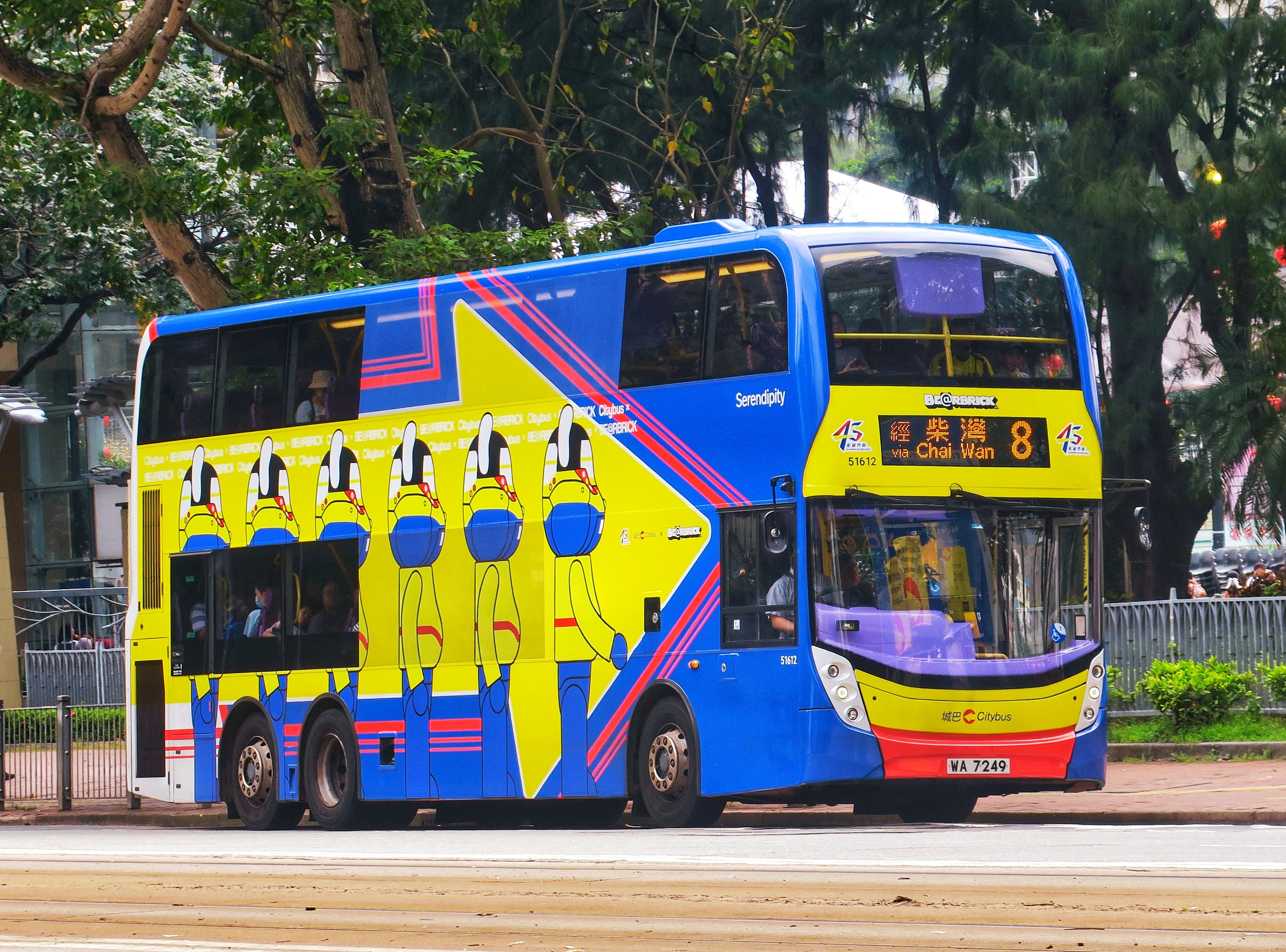
- An Alexander Dennis Enviro500 MMC on Route 8 passing Victoria Park

Overview
- Operator: Citybus
- Vehicle: Alexander Dennis Enviro500 MMC

Route
- Start: Heng Fa Chuen
- Via: Island Eastern Corridor
- End: Exhibition Centre station
- Length: 14 km
- Other routes: Citybus Route N8
- Competition: MTR Island line

Service
- Level: 05:30-00:00
- Alt. level: 06:15-00:45
- Frequency: 11–20 mins.
- Journey time: 48 mins.

Route 8 on Hong Kong Island is an express bus service operated by Citybus, between Exhibition Centre station and Heng Fa Chuen.

== History ==
Route 8 was started by China Motor Bus on 12 November 1949, between Wan Chai Ferry (then next to Stuart Road and Shau Kei Wan via King's Road and Shau Kei Wan Road, in response to the inauguration of a new ferry route between Wan Chai and Jordan Road Ferry Pier by HYF, and also with the intention of augment the then congesting Route 2. The route became the first route CMB started after the Second World War.

On 1 August 1954 CMB started a new route with no number between Shau Kei Wan and Chai Wan to serve the new bungalow development area there. At first the new route only serviced during mornings and from noon to evening, but in December service expanded to whole day long. On 1 June 1955 it merged with the main Route 8, with the terminus designated at the intersection between today's Chai Wan Road and Tai Tam Road (at that time, both roads were called Island Road). Still, the terminus was far away from development in Chai Wan, so a new route 8A was started in 1959 as a solution. 8A merged with 8 on 8 February 1961 after completion of widening works on Chai Wan Road. Consequently, the terminus was moved to the resite estates.

On 1 July 1972 the route was classified as an urban slope route, with a price higher than flat-road routes. On the same day service was further extended to San Ha Street, Chai Wan, to service the new Chai Wan Estate. At that time patronage on the route was high and it was usual to have a full bus. Starting from mid-1975, the route was completely serviced by double-deckers. On 22 June 1985 the eastern terminus was moved again to Chai Wan (East) Bus Terminus at Sheung On Street, and again on 1 February 1990 to Siu Sai Wan to serve the new Siu Sai Wan Estate. Partial air-conditioned service started on 27 February 1995, amongst the first batch of CMB routes to have done so.

Route 8 was handed over to NWFB on 1 September 1998 following the end of CMB franchise on Hong Kong Island bus services. Later the Siu Sai Wan terminus was changed to Island Resort.

Patronage on the route started to suffer from slow speed after the establishment of express routes 8X in 1996 and later 8P in 1998. Due to the strong request from local residents, the route was designated an express route on 11 February 2006 with the terminus at Heng Fa Chuen instead of Siu Sai Wan, and the route was changed to Island Eastern Corridor instead of King's Road.

In 2015, route have been extended to Wan Chai North due to the demolition of the Wan Chai Ferry Pier bus terminus for the construction of Sha Tin to Central Link expansion project of Exhibition Centre station until 2022.

== Route ==
=== Current Route ===
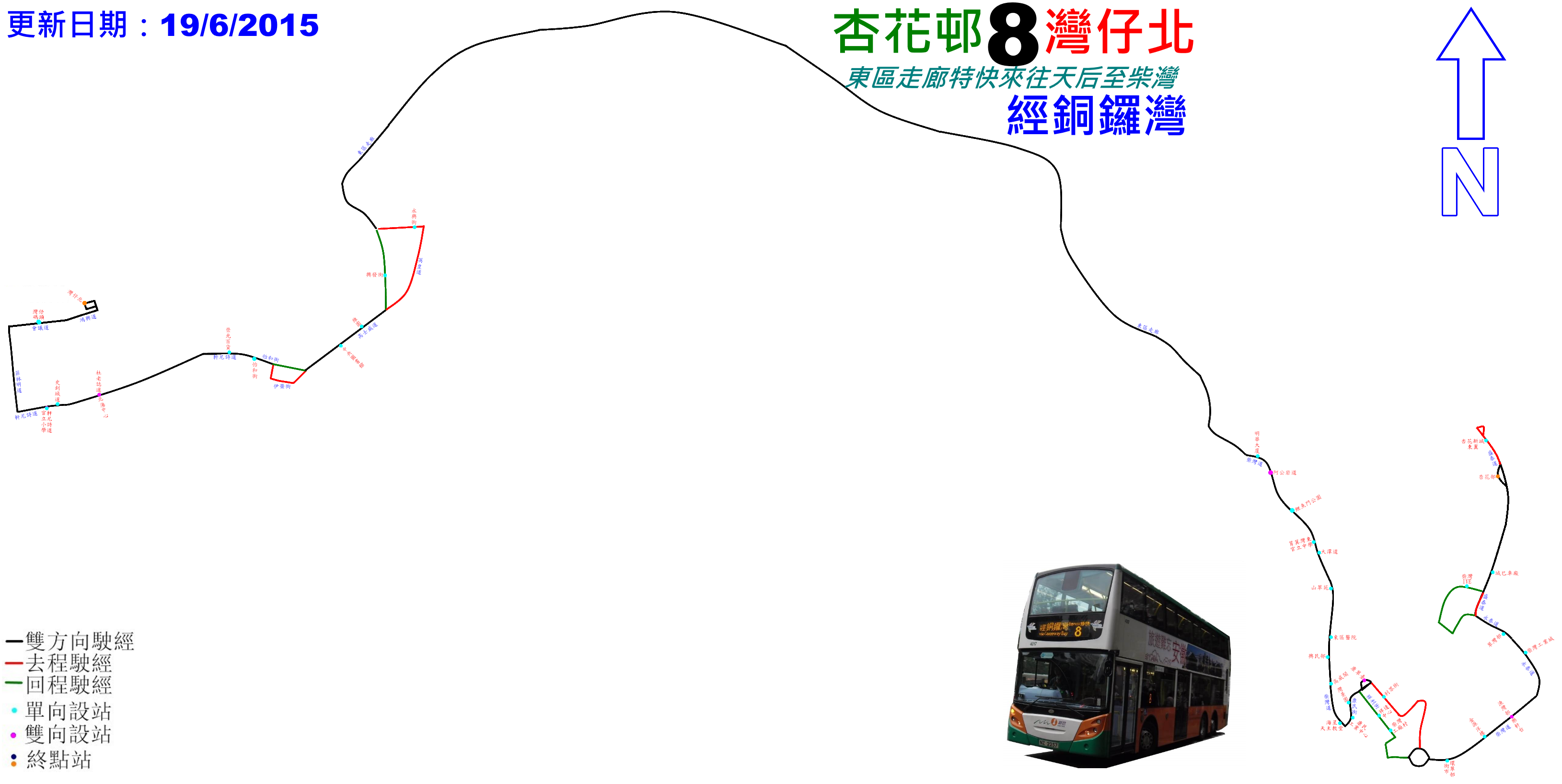
Wiring diagram of this line

Started at Hang Fa Chuen			Start at Exhibition Centre Station		
No.	Name of Bus Stop	Location	No.	Name of Bus Stop	Location
1	Hang Fa Chuen	Bus Terminus	1	Exhibition Centre Station	Bus Terminus
2	Paradise Mall (East)	Shing Tai Road	2	Stewart Road	Hennessy Road
3	Citybus Chai Wan Depot	Shing Tai Road	3	Tonnochy Road	Hennessy Road
4	Chai Wan Industrial City	Wing Tai Road	4	Sogo Department Store	Hennessy Road
5	Lok Hin Terrace	Chai Wan Road	5	Victoria Park	Causeway Road
6	Wan Tsui Shopping Centre	Chai Wan Road	6	Hing Fat Street	
7	Lee Chung Street		7	Ming Wa Building	Chai Wan Road
8	Greenwood Terrace	Bus Terminus	8	A Kung Noam Road	Chai Wan Road
9	Hong Man Industrial Centre	Hong Man Street	9	Lei Yue Mun Park	Chai Wan Road
10	Star Of The Sea Catholic Church	Chai Wan Road	10	Tai Tam Road	Chai Wan Road
11	Hing Man Estate	Chai Wan Road	11	Eastern Hospital	Chai Wan Road
12	Shan Tsui Court	Chai Wan Road	12	Ko Wai Court	Chai Wan Road
13	Shau Kei Wan East Government Secondary School	Chai Wan Road	13	Bayview Park	Hong Man Street
14	A Kung Noam Road	Chai Wan Road	14	Greenwood Garden	Bus Terminus
15	Wing Hong Street		15	Cheung Tat Centre	Cheung Lee Street
16	Hong Kong Central Library	Causeway Bay Road	16	Chai Wan Industrial Estate	Cheung Lee Street
17	Yee Wo Street		17	Gold Mine Building	Chai Wan Road
18	CNT Tower	Hennessy Road	18	Yue Wan Estate	Chai Wan Road
19	Hennessy Road Government School	Hennessy Road	19	Tsui Wan Estate	Wing Tai Road
20	Exhibition Centre Station	Bus Terminus	20	HKIVE (Chai Wan)	Shun Tai Road
			21	Hang Fa Chuen	Bus Terminus

=== Route prior to express designation ===
Route 8 was a local service before 11 February 2006, which had a distance of 12.5 km for both directions in 66 minutes time, via:

==== Wan Chai Ferry towards Siu Sai Wan ====
- Siu Sai Wan Road
- Chai Wan Road
- IEC slip road
- Ning Fu Street
- Cheung Lee Street
- Hong Man Street
- Chai Wan Road
- Shau Kei Wan Road
- King's Road
- Kornhill Road
- King's Road
- Causeway Road
- Irving Street
- Pennington Street
- Yee Wo Street
- Hennessy Road
- Fleming Road
- Wan Chai Ferry Bus Terminus access road

==== Siu Sai Wan towards Wan Chai Ferry ====
- Wan Chai Ferry Bus Terminus access road
- Fleming Road
- Hennessy Road
- Yee Wo Street
- Causeway Road
- King's Road
- Kornhill Road
- King's Road
- Shau Kei Wan Road
- Chai Wan Road
- Hong Man Street
- Cheung Lee Street
- Kat Sing Street
- Chai Wan Road
- Siu Sai Wan Road

== Associated night services ==
- N8, between Exhibition Centre station and Heng Fa Chuen
- N8X, between Kennedy Town and Siu Sai Wan (Island Resort)
