= Wan Chai Pier =

Pier in Hong Kong

Coordinates: 22°16′55.46″N 114°10′32.36″E

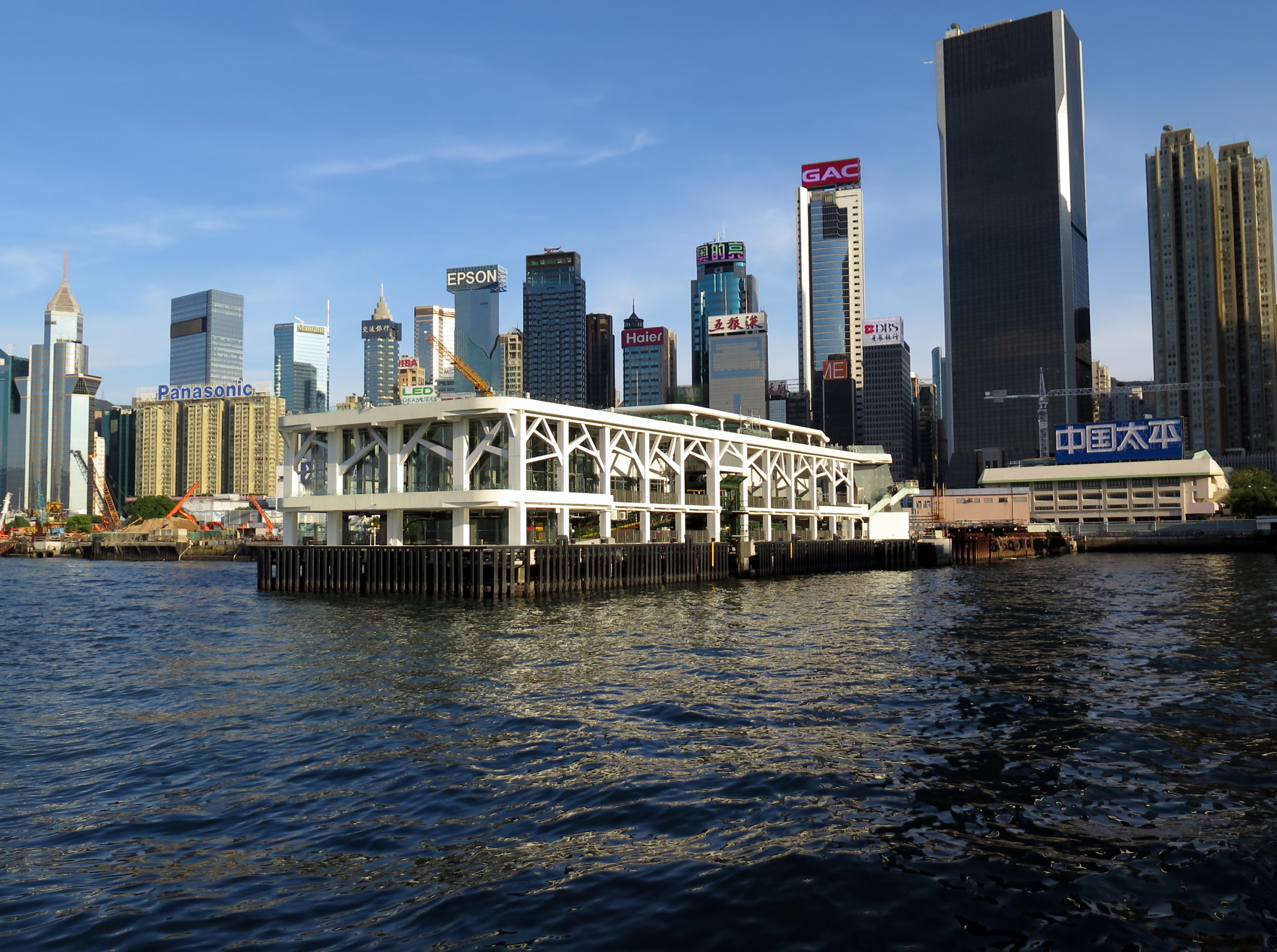
(Current) Third generation Wan Chai Pier in August 2014

The Wan Chai Pier (Chinese: 灣仔碼頭), or Wan Chai Ferry Pier (Chinese: 灣仔渡輪碼頭), is a pier at the coast of Wan Chai North on the Hong Kong Island of Hong Kong. The pier is operated by Star Ferry, and provides ferry services to Tsim Sha Tsui. The pier is near the Hong Kong Convention and Exhibition Centre.

The current pier is the third generation pier:

- First generation: from 1929 to 1968
- Second generation: from 1968 to 2014. The pier had its last day service on 29 August 2014, and was later demolished as part of the Central and Wan Chai Reclamation.
- Third generation: since 2014

== First generation (1929 to 1968) ==
At the end of the Wan Chai reclamation from 1922 to 1929 (Praya East Reclamation Scheme), a pier "120 feet 8 inches long and 35 feet 4 inches wide with four flights of landing steps and situated at the end of Tonnochy Road" was built. Probably this pier was damaged in the second World War and had to be repaired. The ferry services between the Wan Chai Pier and Jordan Road, Kowloon was in operation as early as 12 November 1949. Because the ferry line mainly catered to passengers on the Hong Kong Island to the east of Wan Chai, the China Motor Bus company rerouted its bus route no. 2 so that it passed near the Wan Chai Pier. At the same time the bus company started the auxiliary bus route no. 8. The Wan Chai Pier was not where it is today. It was located on Gloucester Road, near Tonnochy Road. The bus route no. 8 then and the route no. 11, which entered service later, both had stops on Tonnochy Road.

On 1 June 1956, the Stewart Pier commenced operation and the ferry service to Jordan Road was rerouted to this pier. On 3 July 1956, a new ferry line to Kowloon City started operation at the Tonnochy Road Pier. This ferry line was terminated on 24 June 1967.

On 12 November 1963, the ferry service between Hung Hom and Wan Chai commenced operation.

== Second generation (1968 to 2014) ==
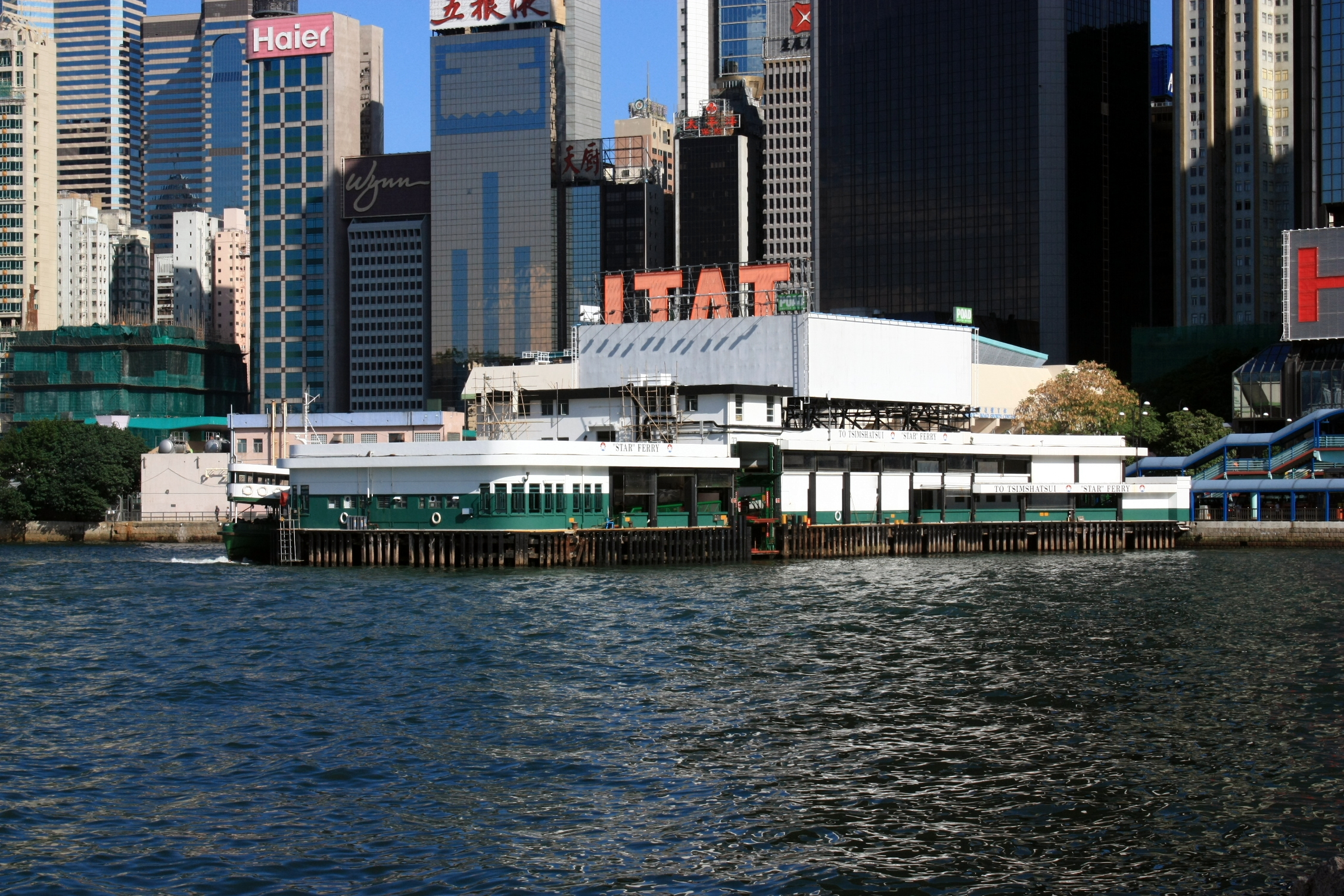
Second Generation Pier in June 2009

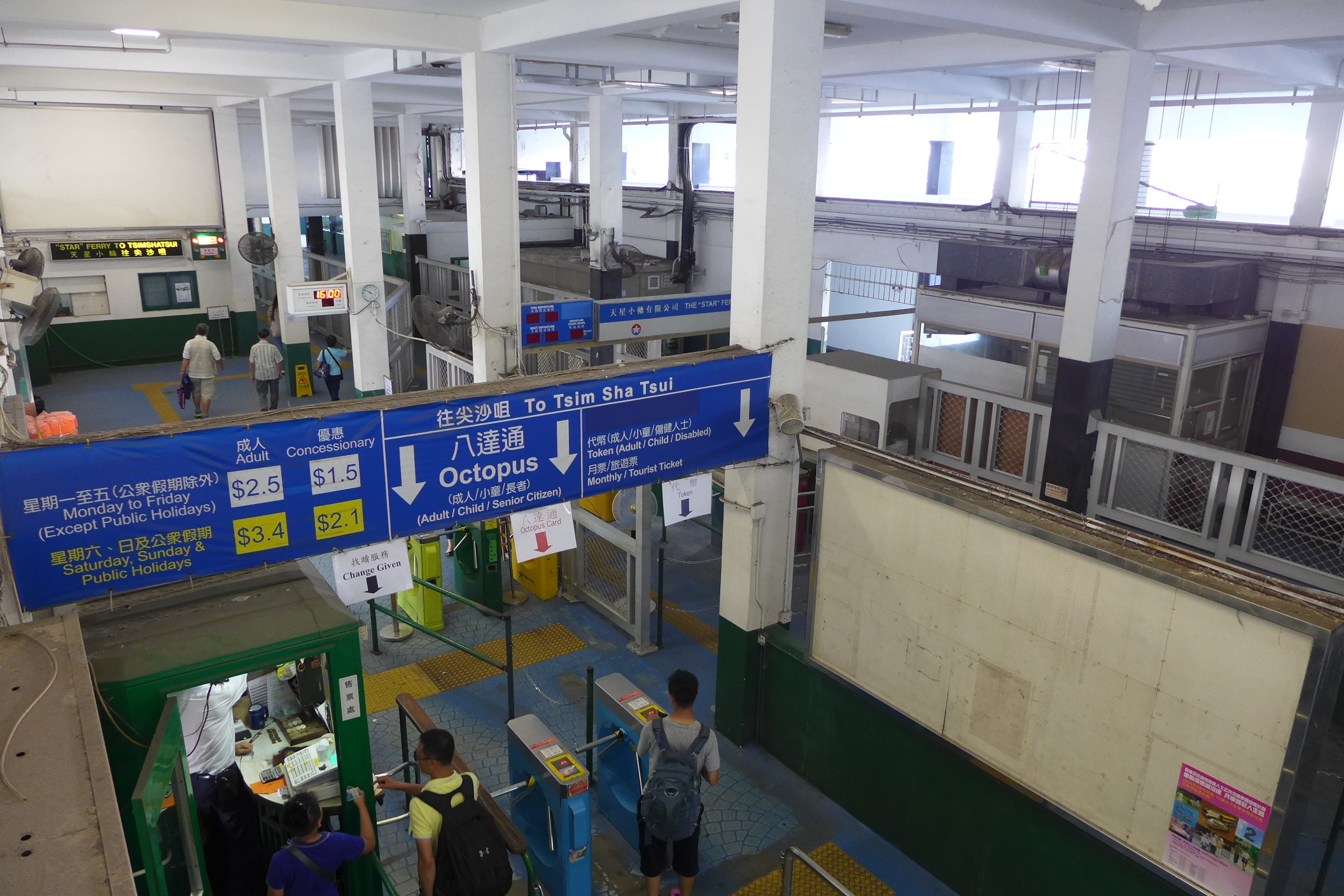
Pier Entry Gate in August 2014

From 1965 to 1972, Wan Chai underwent more land reclamation. The coastline moved north from Gloucester Road to today's Convention Avenue and Hung Hing Road.

In April 1988, the Jordan Road <-> Wan Chai ferry line was terminated and replaced by the new line between Tsim Sha Tsui and Wan Chai.

On 1 April 2011, the Hung Hom <-> Wan Chai line was terminated. The Wan Chai<->Tsim Sha Tsui line has since been the only remaining ferry service at the Wan Chai Pier.

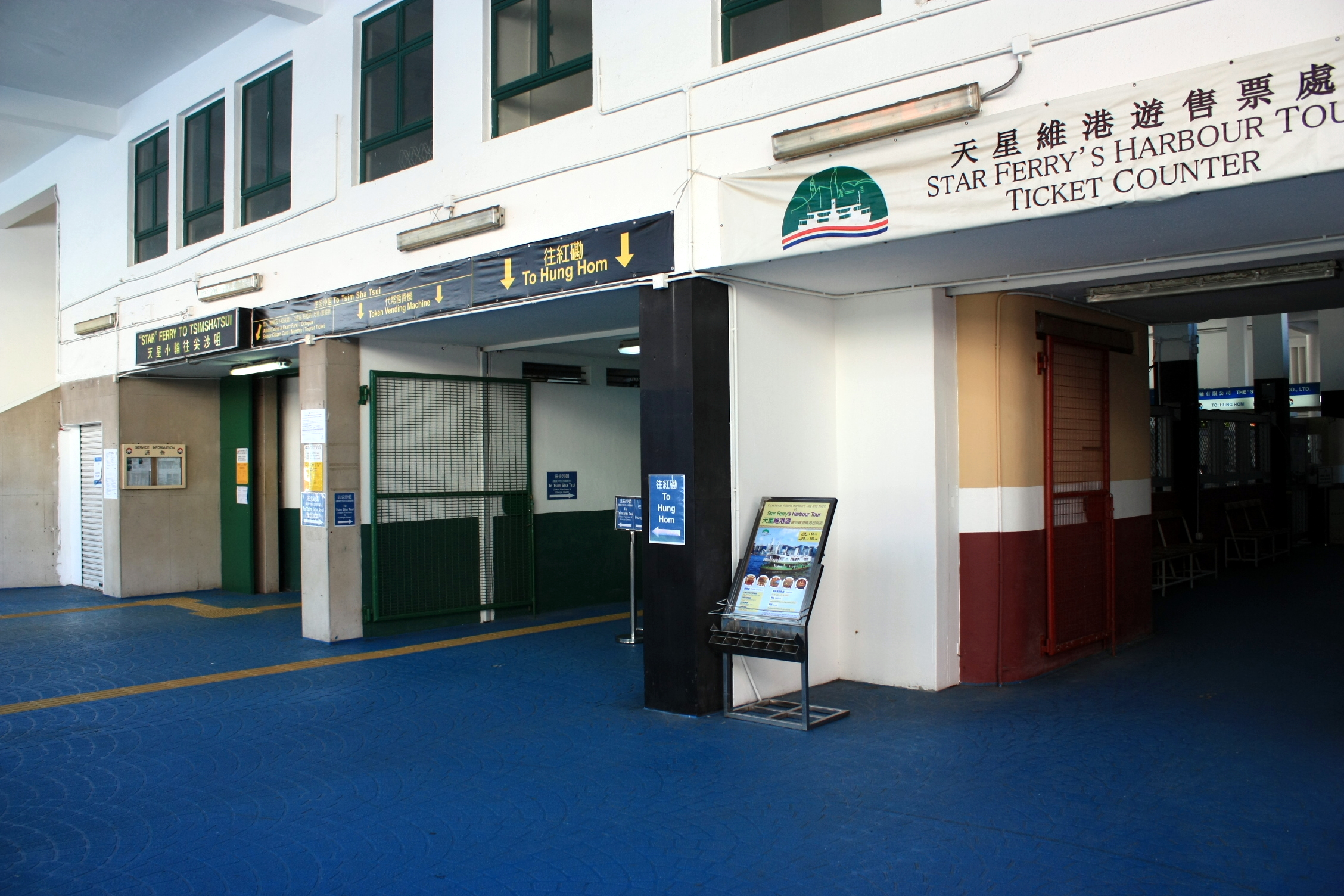
Entrances to the Wan Chai Pier for Star Ferry Lines to Tsim Sha Tsui and Hung Hom in June 2009

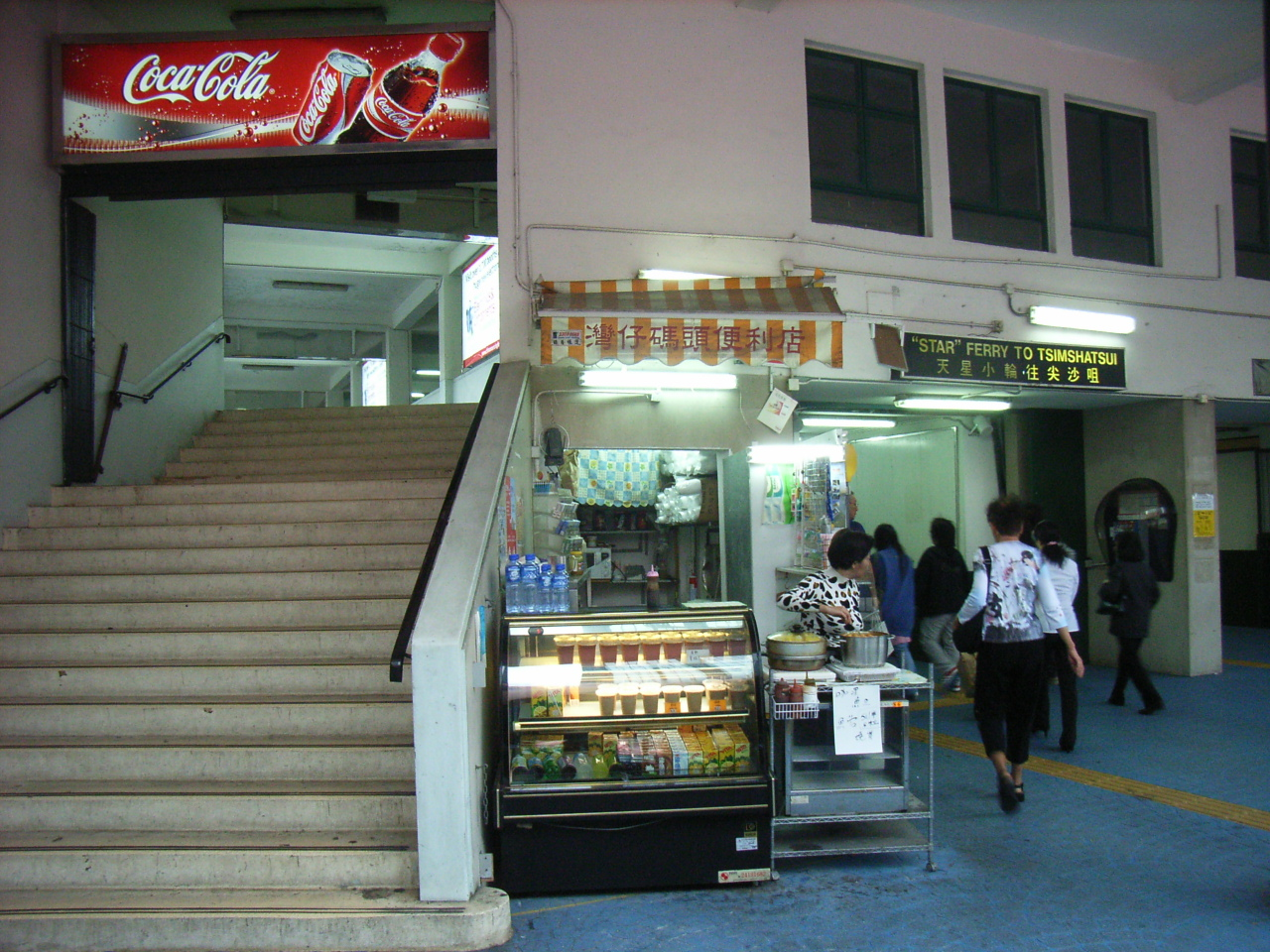
A store near the entrance selling Curry Fishballs and Siu Mai in April 2006

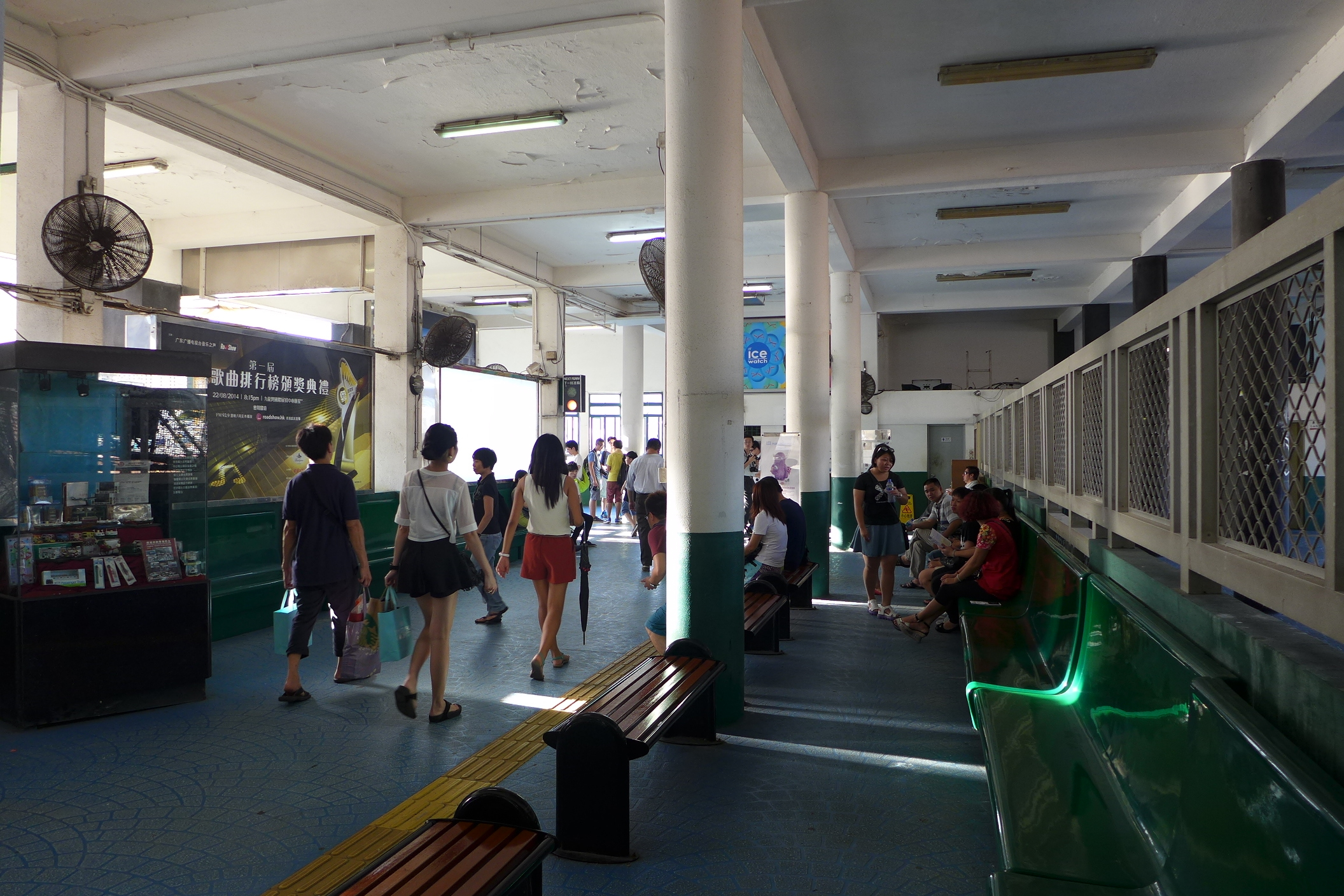
Waiting Area in August 2014

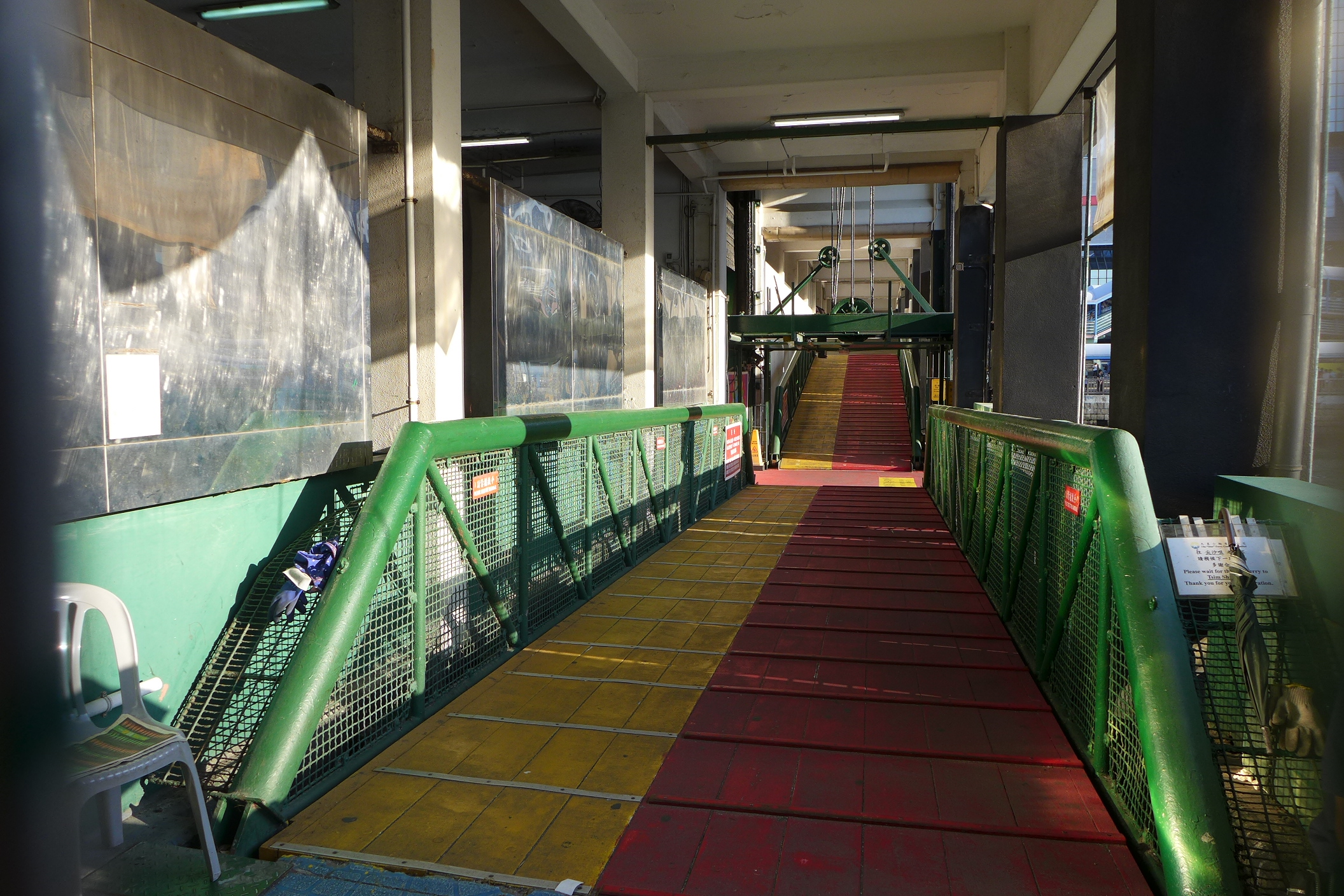
Boarding walkways in August 2014

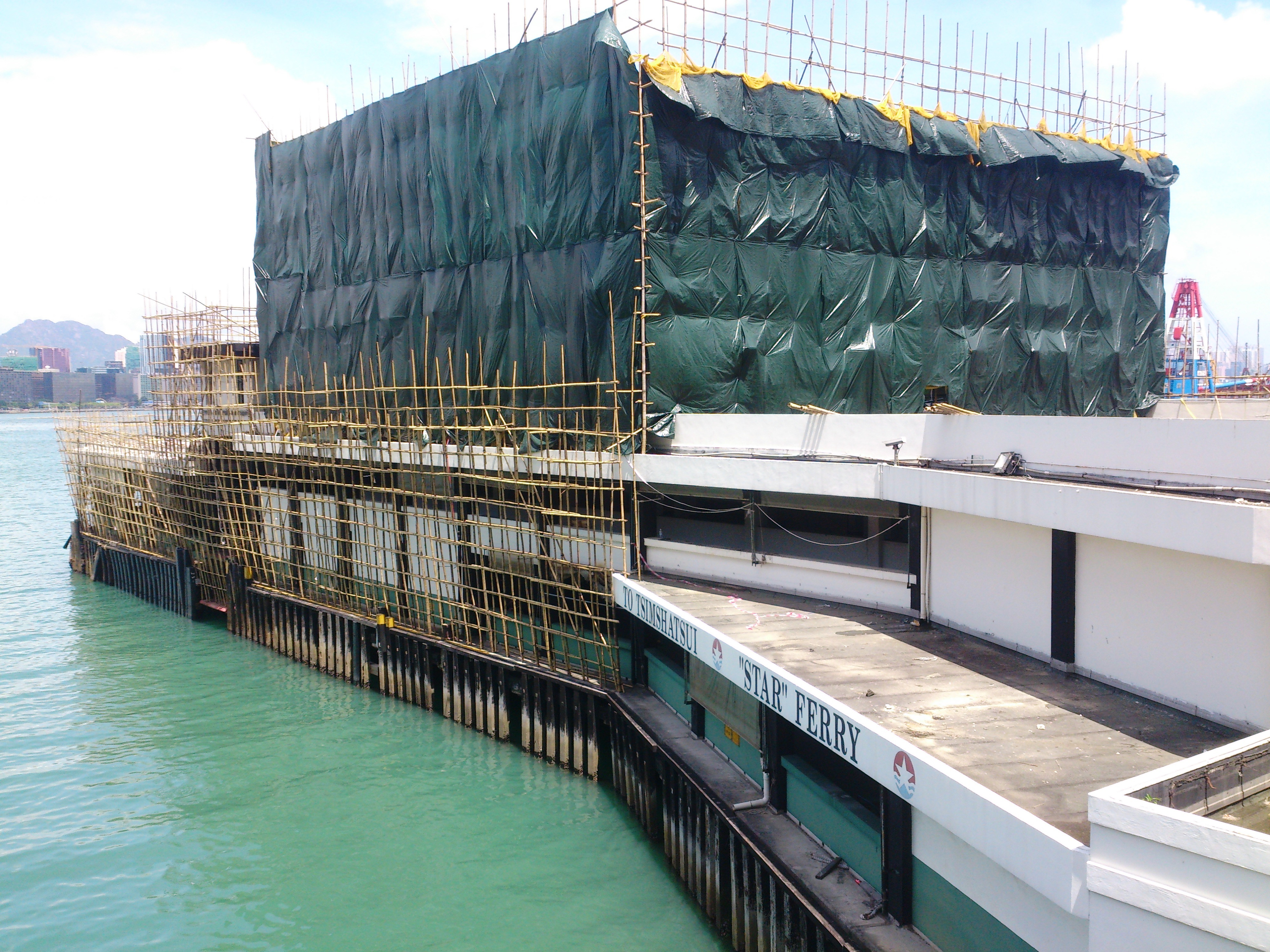
Pier to be demolished as of September 2014

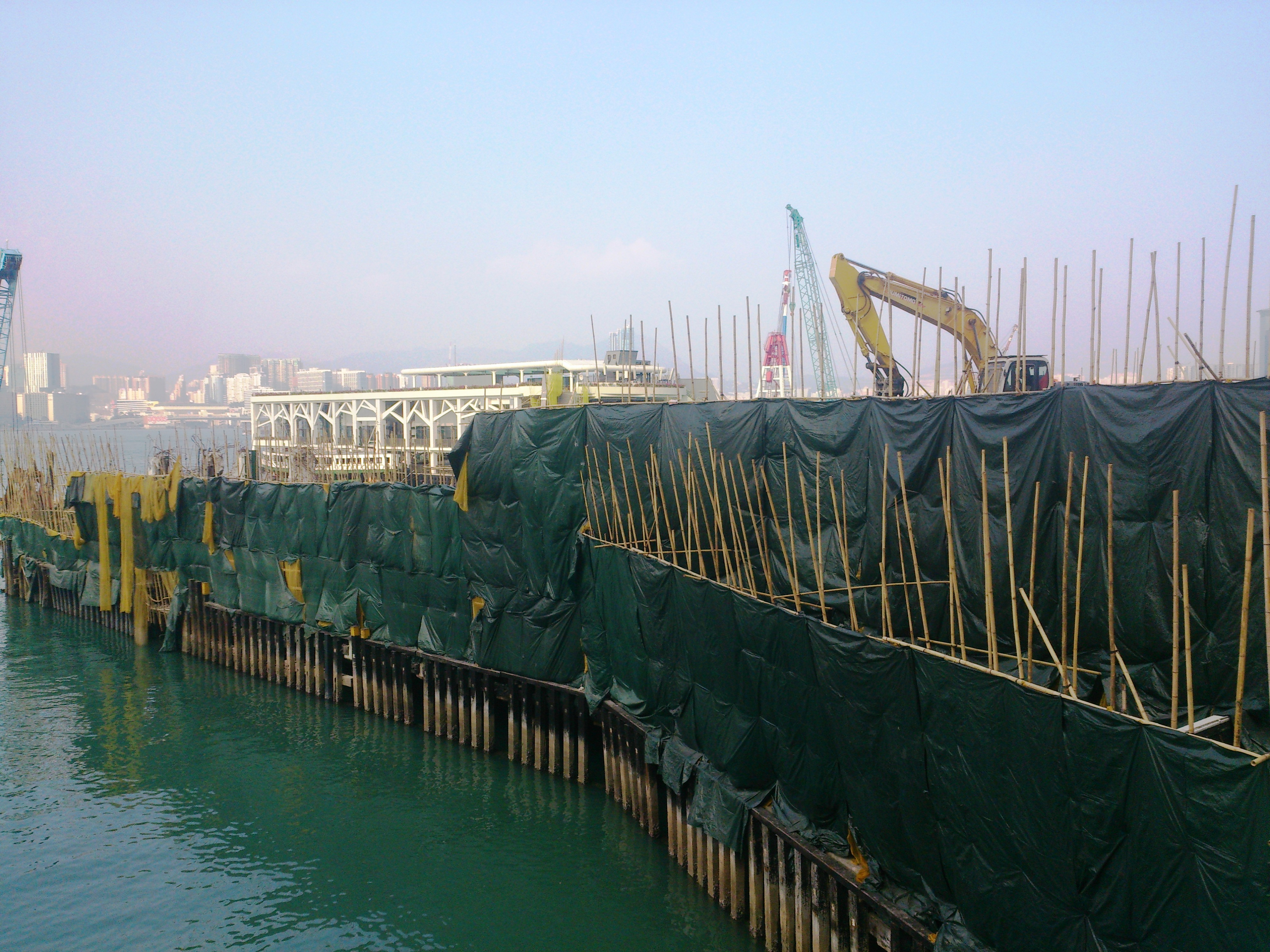
Pier being demolished as of November 2014

== Third generation (since 2014) ==
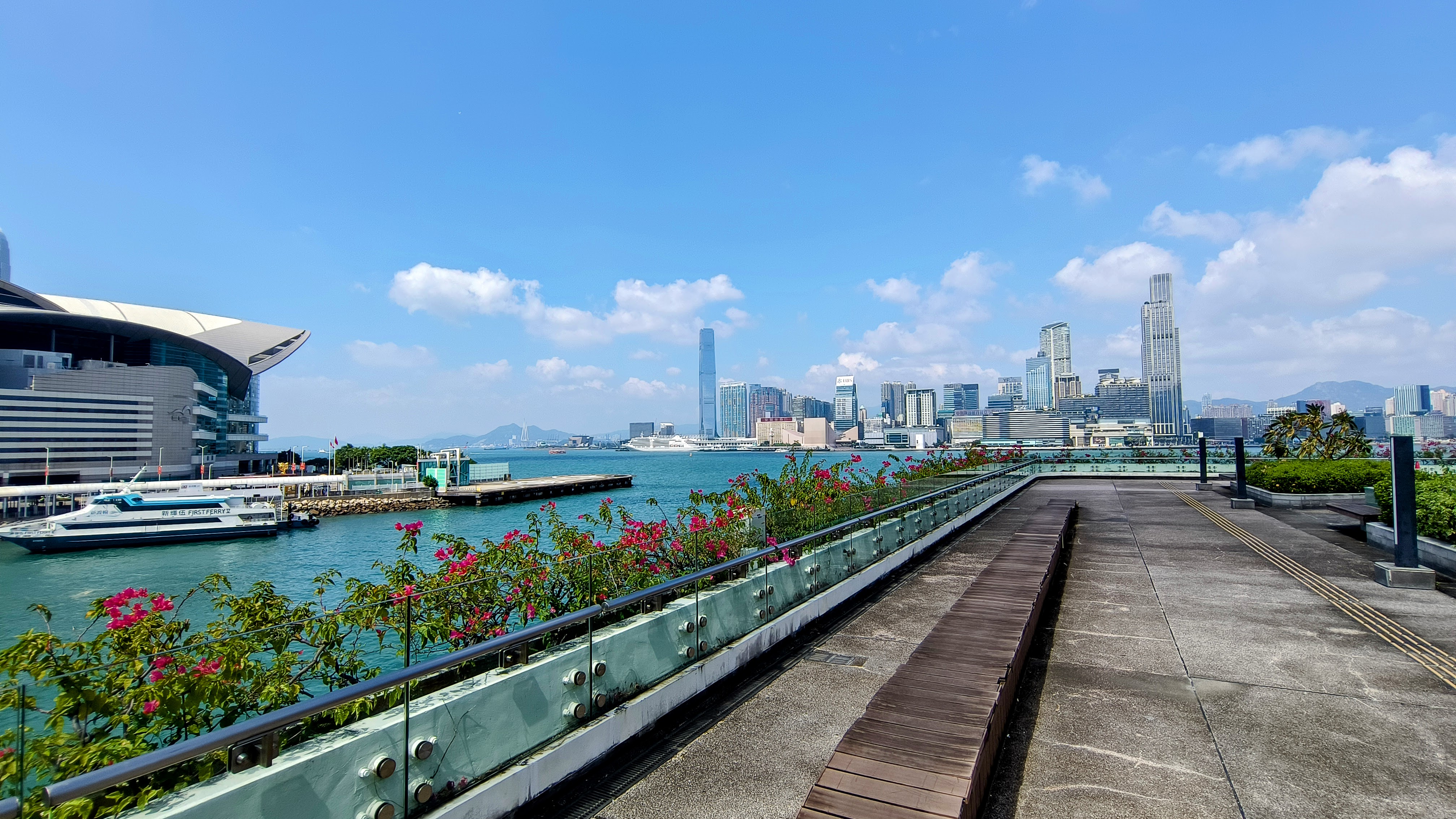
Wan Chai Ferry Pier Roof Garden

As the site of the second generation pier is included in the reclamation area of the Central–Wan Chai Bypass project, the government decided to terminate and demolish the 46-year-old second generation Wan Chai Pier, and build a new pier at the current coast to the north. The Star Ferry Company that has been operating the Wan Chai<->Tsim Sha Tsui ferry line objected to the demolition in 2007.

The new pier commenced operation on 30 August 2014. It has an area of about 2,200 sq m, about 150 sq m less than the previous pier. The facilities are more or less the same as the Central Star Ferry Pier (Piers no. 7 & 8). The second floor of the new pier will be used for food and catering.

However, the second floor reserved for food and catering will have to wait at least half a year to have electricity connection after the pier's operation commenced. Passengers questioned that the new walkway to the new pier was too narrow and insufficient for the passenger flow during peak hours. The Civil Engineering and Development Department replied that the new passenger walkway was designed to accommodate the passenger flow generated by the current ferry line.

== Transport interchange terminus ==
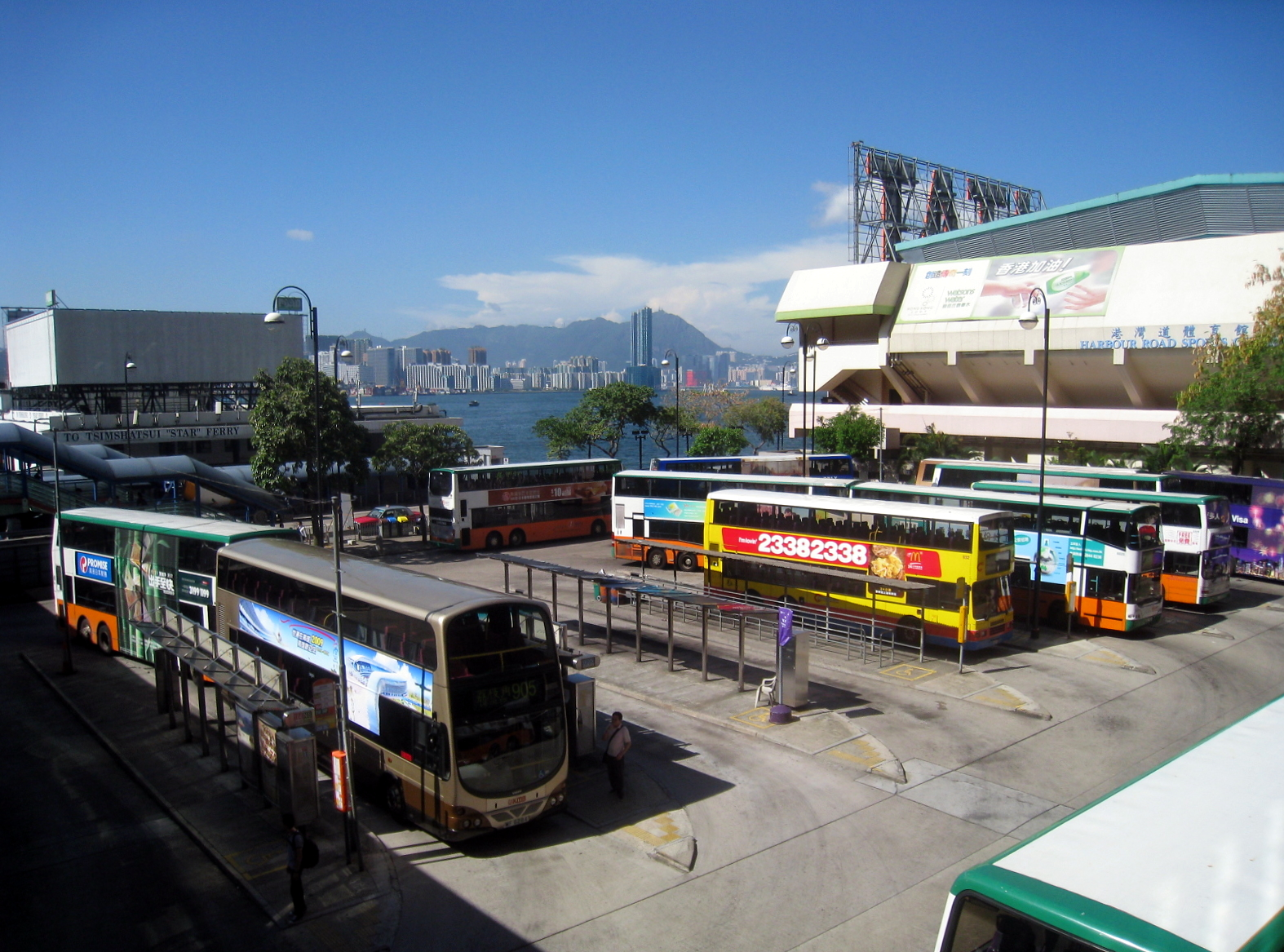
Wan Chai Ferry Pier Public Transport Interchange in June 2009 (Demolished)

There was a bus terminus right across the Convention Avenue from the Wan Chai Pier. The bus terminus commenced operation on 10 March 1968. The China Motor Bus routes 8 and 11 were rerouted there at the same time. As space for a bus terminus was in short supply in Wan Chai, the bus terminus was expanded and routes were modified in the 1970s and 80s. After Convention Avenue and Hung Hing Road opened to traffic, a footbridge connecting the Pier and the terminus was built. The terminus was constantly highly saturated and it had been a very important terminus. As the Wan Chai North Reclamation Area became more developed, the terminus was never short of passengers.

Bus routes operated by the Kowloon Motor Bus, First Bus, Citybus as well as some non-franchised bus companies could be found. Those franchised bus routes provided connections between the pier and other areas in Hong Kong.

Bus routes at the bus terminus included: 2A, 2X, 8, 8P, 40, 40M, 905, 960.

In the 1970s to 90s, this bus terminus also served as the terminus for Green Minibuses. The first generation Hong Kong Island route 14 (terminated in 1980), route 33 (terminated in 1985) and the current route 36 (relocated to Stewart Road in 1995) minibuses all used this terminus.

On 6 February 2012, the cross-harbour bus route 930A's morning service to Hong Kong Island was extended to this terminus. On 29 July 2012, the terminus of the route 930 was relocated from Admiralty (East) to this terminus. The start station of route 930A's return ride was also relocated to here. These two routes were the first two routes to Tsuen Wan from this terminus. The route 40M used this terminal as its terminus. To accommodate the reroute of routes 930 and 930A, the terminus of 40M was relocated to the Tamar Central Government Complex and ceased to pass through the Wan Chai Pier Terminus.

According to the current Sha Tin to Central Link project, the site of the Wan Chai Ferry Pier Public Transport Interchange will be used as the construction site of the Exhibition Centre MTR station. The terminal is relocated to a site near the coast, a newly reclaimed area to the north of Hung Hing Road, the entrance of which is at the junction of Hung Hing Road and Marsh Road. After the completion of the Exhibition Centre station, the original site of the bus terminus will be rebuilt into a sheltered transport interchange terminus with 9 single pits, 2 double pits, 1 taxi stand and 2 positions for loading and unloading of goods.

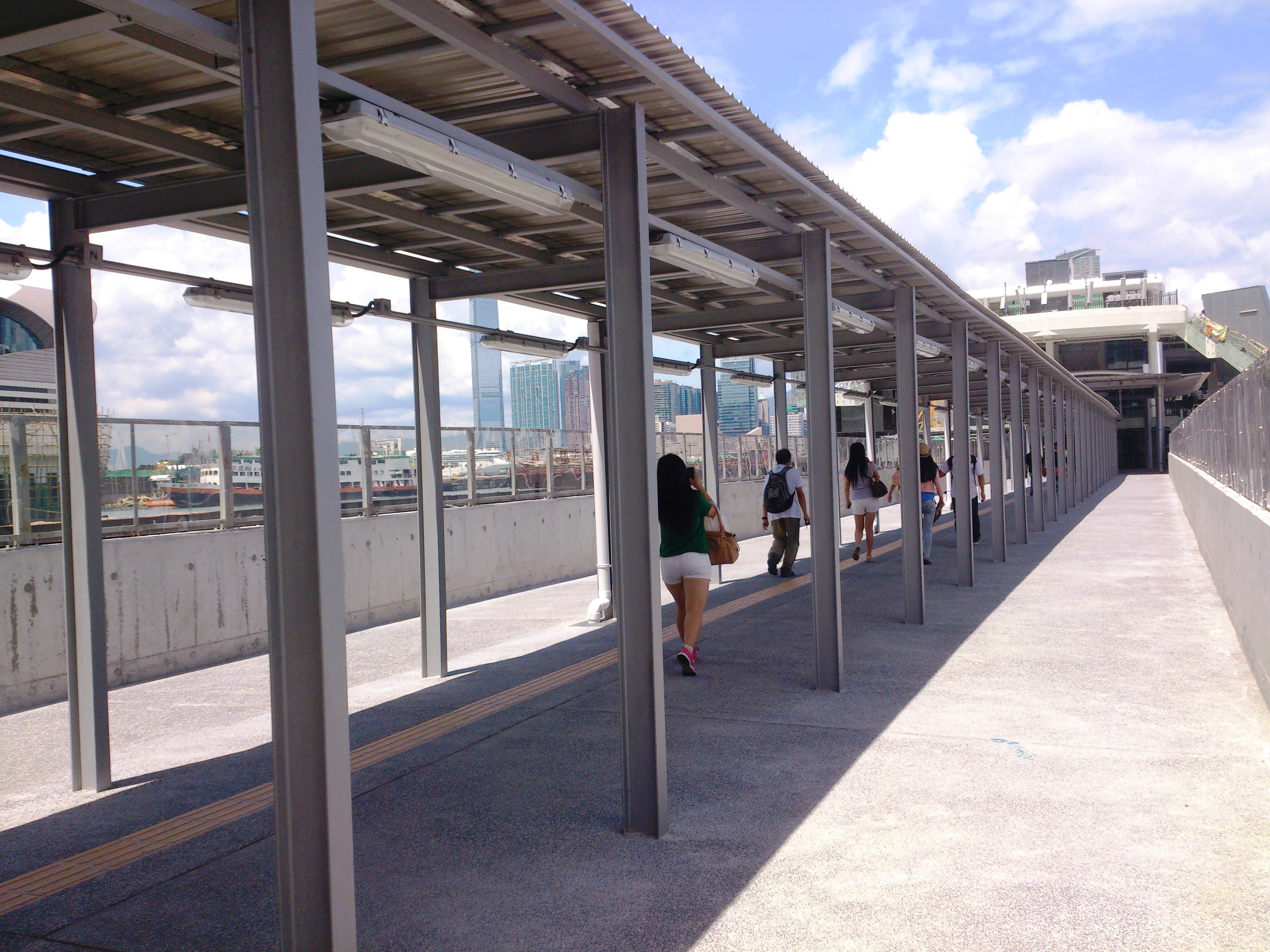
Covered walkway to the pier in September 2014

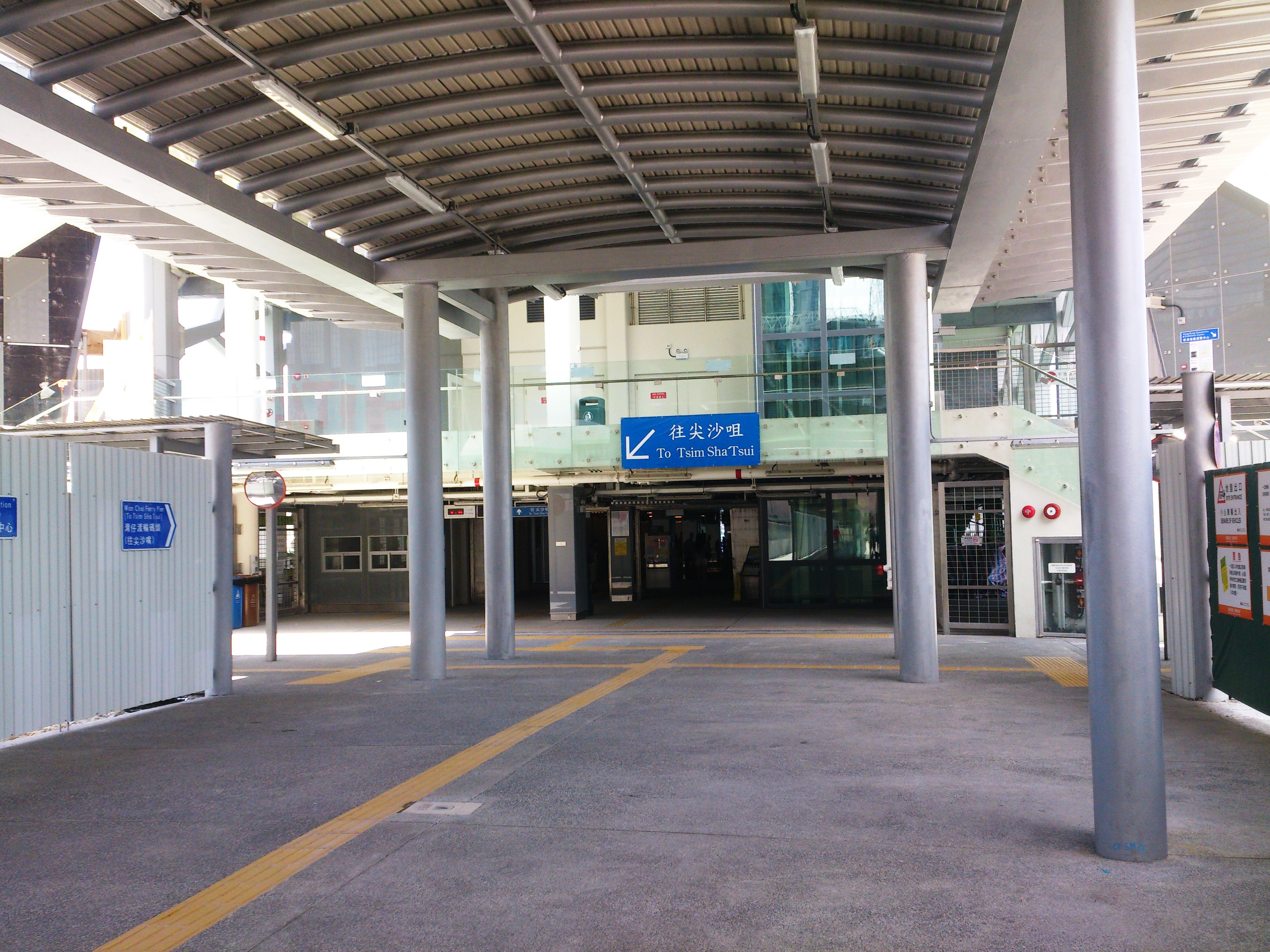
Front of the pier in September 2014

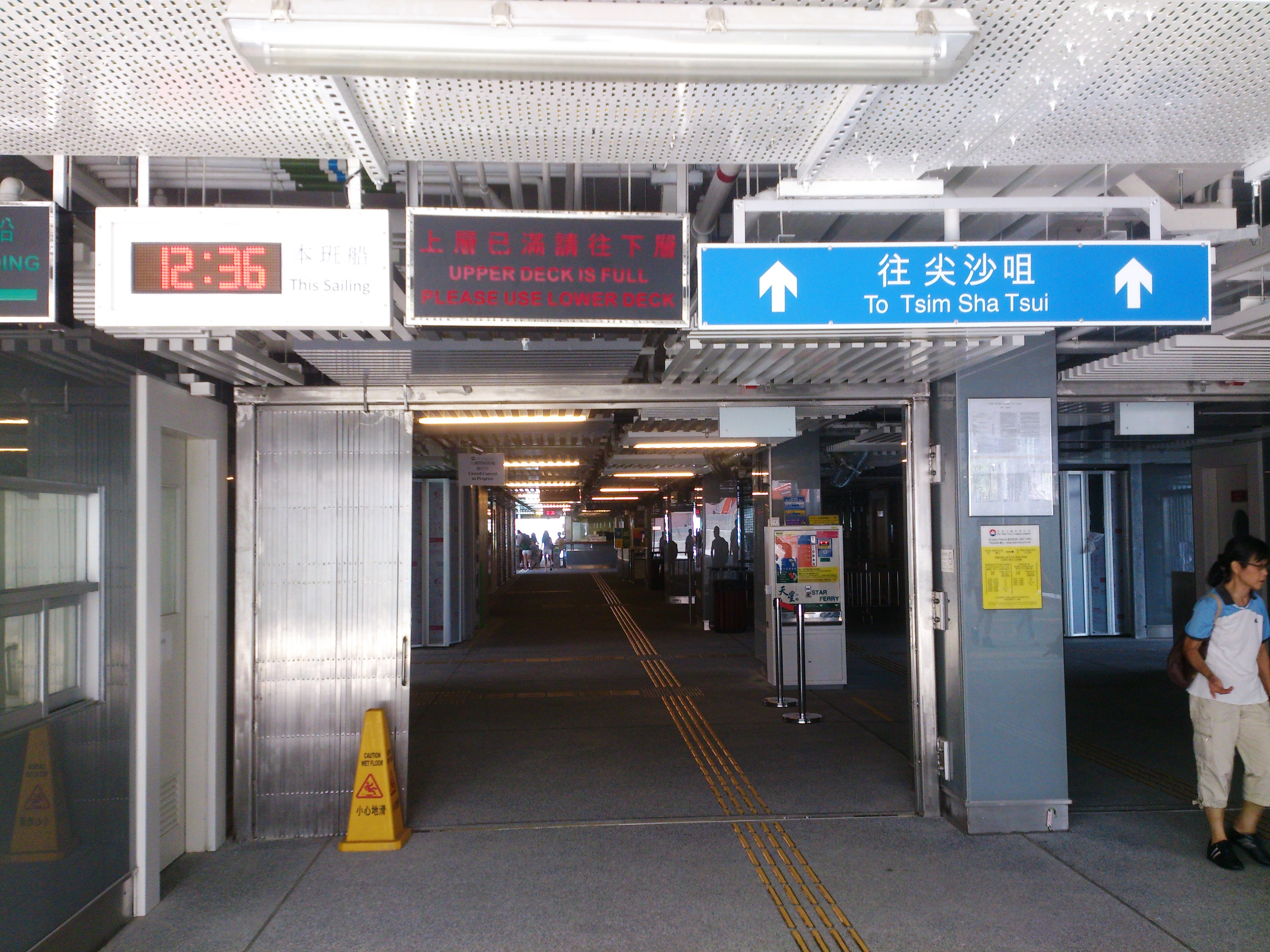
Pier entrance in September 2014

== Nearby places ==
1. Golden Bauhinia Square
2. Hong Kong Convention and Exhibition Centre
3. Central Plaza
4. Great Eagle Centre
5. Renaissance Harbour View Hotel Hong Kong
6. Wan Chai Sports Ground
7. Sun Hung Kai Centre
8. Harbour Road Sports Centre
9. Fleming Road
10. Convention Avenue
11. Tonnochy Road
12. Victoria Harbour
