= Exhibition Centre station (MTR) =

Railway station in Wan Chai, Hong Kong

Exhibition Centre 會展
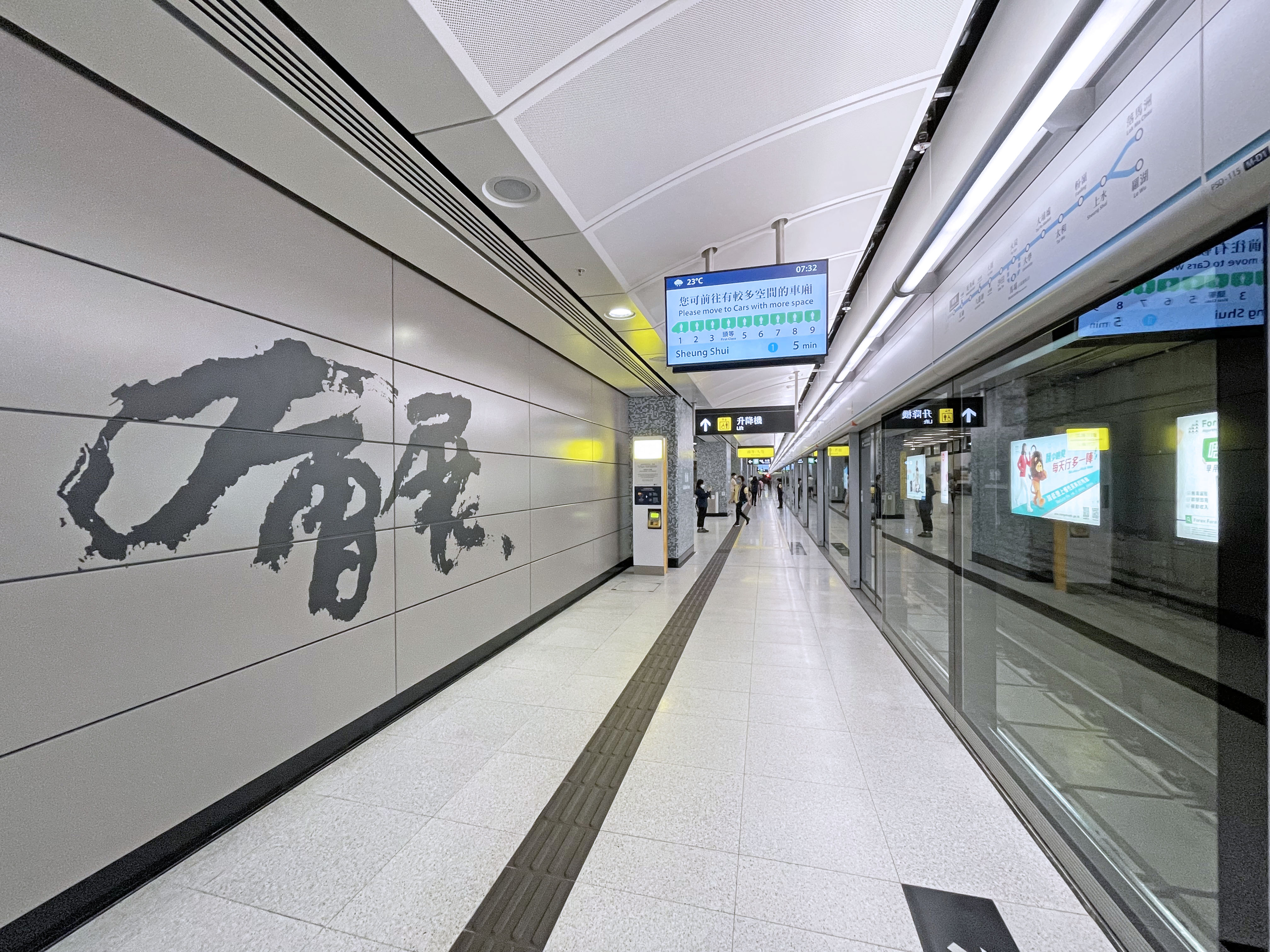
- Platform in May 2022

Chinese name
- Chinese: 會展
- Simplified Chinese: 会展
- Cantonese Yale: Wuih Jín
- Literal meaning: Convention and Exhibition
Transcriptions
Standard Mandarin
- Hanyu Pinyin: Huìzhǎn
Yue: Cantonese
- Yale Romanization: Wuih Jín
- Jyutping: wui^{6} zin^{2}

General information
- Location: Junction of Fleming Road and Convention Avenue; Wan Chai, Victoria; Hong Kong
- Coordinates: 22°16′54″N 114°10′31″E
- System: MTR rapid transit station
- Owner: KCR Corporation
- Operator: MTR Corporation
- Lines: East Rail line; North Island line (proposed)
- Platforms: 2 Split-level side platform
- Tracks: 2
- Connections: Wan Chai station (via footbridge from Exit B3)

Construction
- Structure type: island
- Accessible: Yes

Other information
- Station code: EXC

History
- Opening: East Rail line: 15 May 2022; 4 years ago
- Former names: Exhibition

Services
Preceding station	MTR	Following station
Admiralty Terminus	East Rail line	Hung Hom towards Lo Wu or Lok Ma Chau
Planned North Island Line
Tamar Terminus	Tseung Kwan O line (North Island line)	Causeway Bay North towards Po Lam or LOHAS Park
Route map
Location
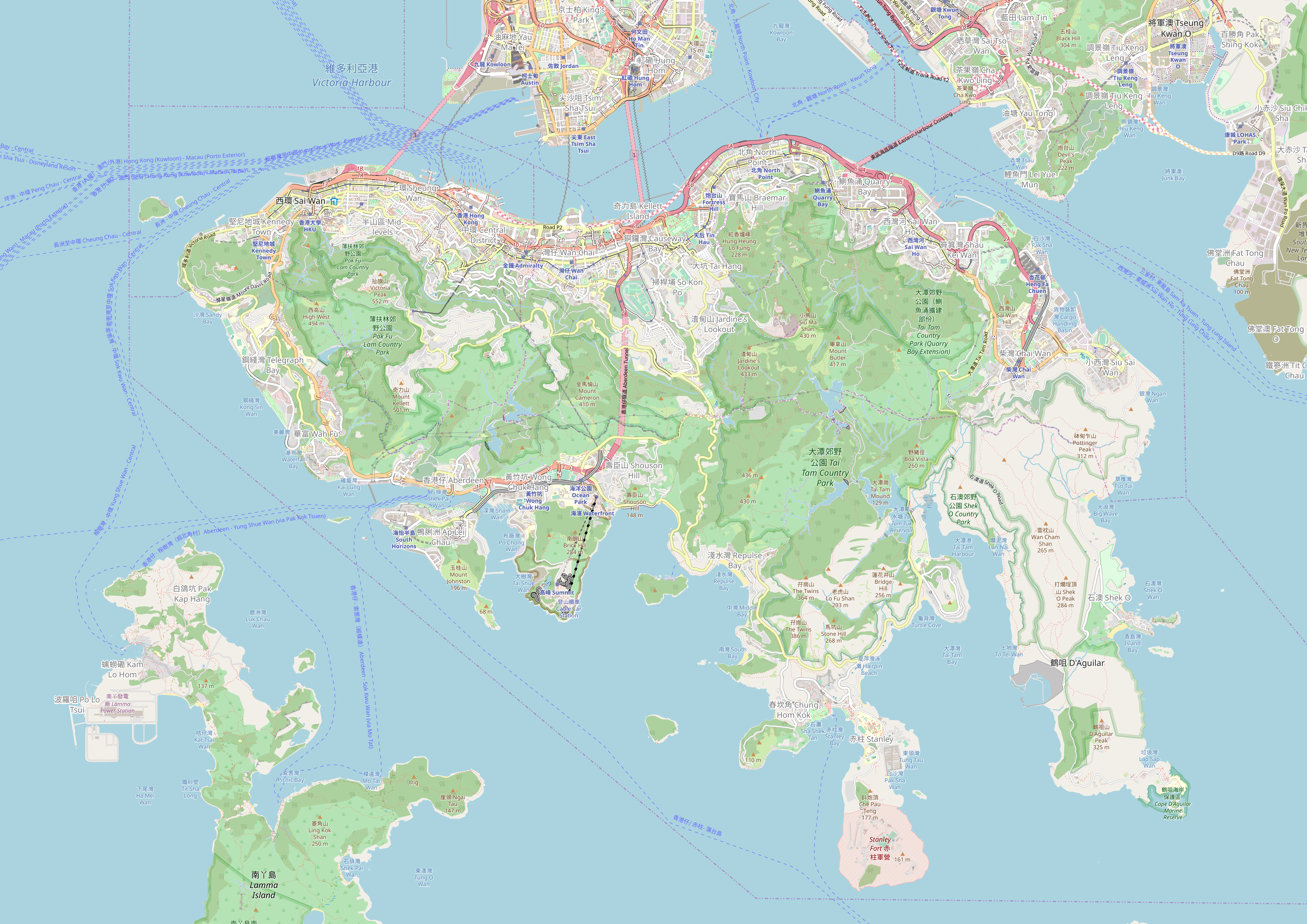
- Location within MTR Location within Hong Kong urban core Location within Hong Kong Island

Exhibition Centre (Chinese: 會展; Cantonese Yale: wuih jín) is an MTR station on the East Rail line. The station's colour scheme is teal-grey. It serves the Hong Kong Convention and Exhibition Centre and other parts of Wan Chai North on Hong Kong Island, Hong Kong.

The station was built as part of the Shatin to Central Link project. It topped out on 12 November 2020 and began service on 15 May 2022. This station and the East Rail portion of Admiralty are the first KCRC-owned stations that serve Hong Kong Island. It is the first East Rail line station on Hong Kong Island for trains coming from Hung Hom.

== Description ==
The station serves the Hong Kong Convention and Exhibition Centre, the Wan Chai Sports Ground and various nearby office towers in Wan Chai North.

It will become an interchange station between the North Island line (the extension of Tseung Kwan O line) and the East Rail line, offering cross-platform interchange between the two lines. Initially, only the East Rail line platforms are open, as the North Island line is still being planned.

The station was designed by Farrells. In January 2015, the MTR Corporation awarded a contract to Leighton in a joint venture with China State Construction to build the station and western approach tunnel.

The station was built on the site of the former Harbour Road Sports Centre, Wan Chai Swimming Pool and Wan Chai Ferry Pier Bus Terminus, which were all demolished and reprovisioned elsewhere before construction began. The swimming pool and sports centre were rebuilt on the car park site immediately to the south. The Wan Chai Ferry Pier Bus Terminus, originally located where the station was to be built, was relocated to newly reclaimed land near the new Wan Chai Ferry Pier. The station groundbreaking took place on the former bus terminus site on 20 April 2015. The transport interchange has since been rebuilt on top of Exhibition Centre station as the latter was nearing completion.

There were plans to expand the Hong Kong Convention and Exhibition Centre over the MTR station. The enabling works for this topside development were included during the station construction. Plans for topside convention facilities above the station had since been discontinued in the 2020 Policy Address, citing technical difficulties involved, uncertainties concerning the construction period, and cost-effectiveness.

== Station layout ==
U1	Footbridge	Footbridge towards Wan Chai North (Immigration Tower, Central Plaza, Hong Kong Convention and Exhibition Centre, Wan Chai pier, Wan Chai station)
G	Ground level	Exits
L2	Concourse	Customer service, MTR shops
L4; Upper Platform	Platform 2	← East Rail line towards Admiralty (Terminus)
L4; Upper Platform	Side platform, doors will open on the left
L5; Lower Platform	Platform 1	East Rail line towards Lo Wu or Lok Ma Chau (Hung Hom) →
L5; Lower Platform	Side platform, doors will open on the right

== Entrances/exits ==
- A1: Harbour Centre
- A2: Transport Interchange
- A3: Harbour Road Sports Centre
- B1: Great Eagle Centre
- B2: Golden Bauhinia Square
- B3: Hong Kong Convention and Exhibition Centre, Wan Chai station

== Connections ==
Located above the station is the Exhibition Centre Station Public Transport Interchange, which serves as the terminal point of around 20 bus routes to different parts of Hong Kong. The interchange replaced the former Wan Chai Ferry Pier Bus Terminus, which was temporarily relocated to a nearby site during the station's construction.

The Wan Chai Ferry Pier, which provides Star Ferry service to Tsim Sha Tsui, is located around 150m to the north of the station.

== History ==
Exhibition Centre station was first proposed in the 1994 Railway Development Strategy issued by the Hong Kong Government's Transport Branch as an interchange between the proposed North Island and South Island lines. In the Railway Development Strategy 2000, Exhibition became an interchange between North Island line and Shatin to Central Link. The station was tentatively called Exhibition station, but in late 2017 was renamed to Exhibition Centre station. Its Chinese name remained unchanged.

=== Discovery of WWII bombs ===
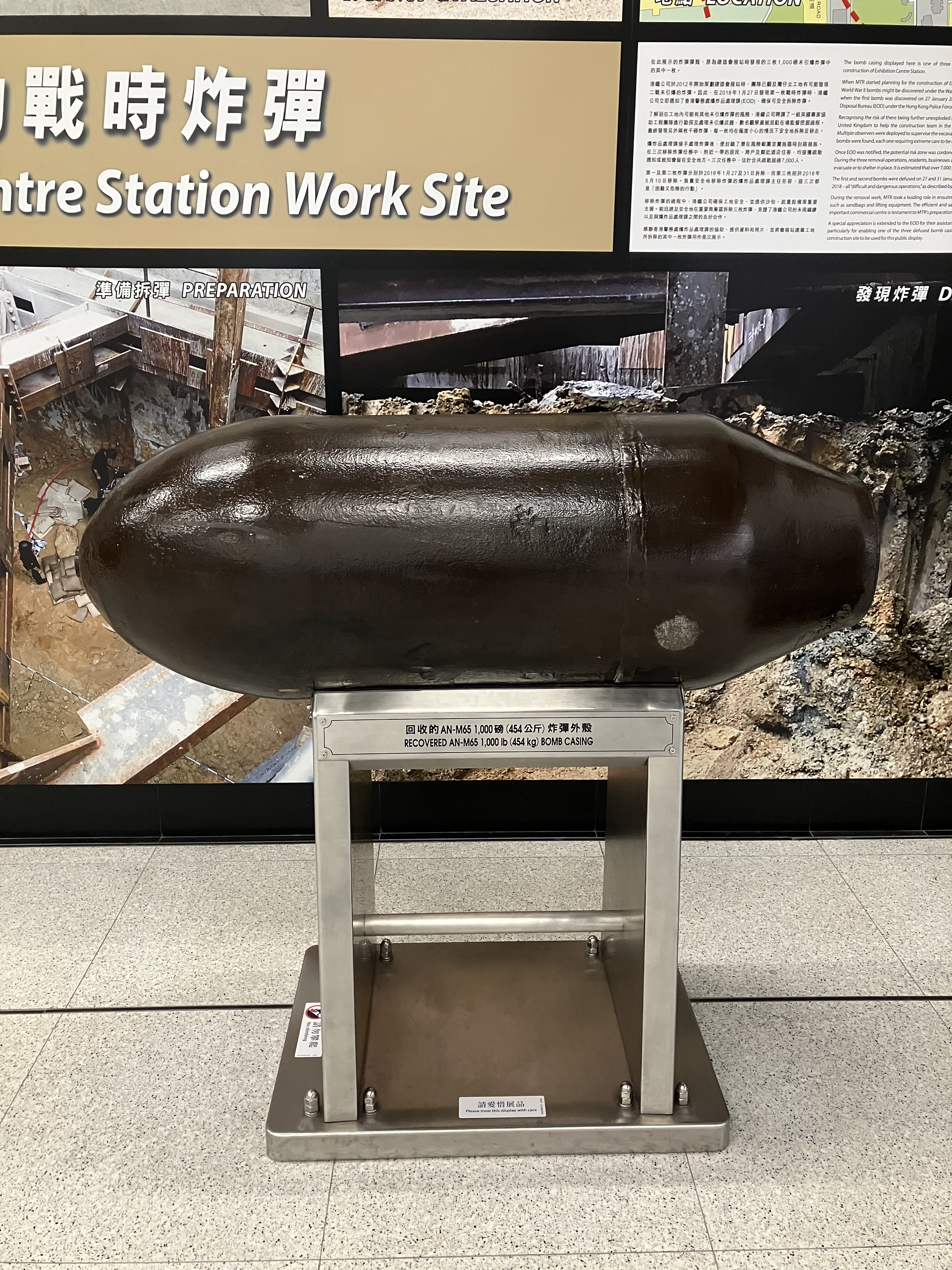
The bomb casing on display at Platform 1

On 27 and 31 January 2018, two American-made AN-M65 bombs, believed to have been dropped during World War II and weighing about 450 kg (990 lb) each, were discovered by workers at the construction site. Construction was suspended for bomb disposal work. Nearly 5000 people in the surrounding area were evacuated and no injuries were reported. Each operation took nearly 24 hours for preparation and disposal. One of the bombs was stripped of its explosive material and put on display inside the station.
