= Tonnochy Road =

Street in Hong Kong

Coordinates: 22.28140°N 114.17705°E

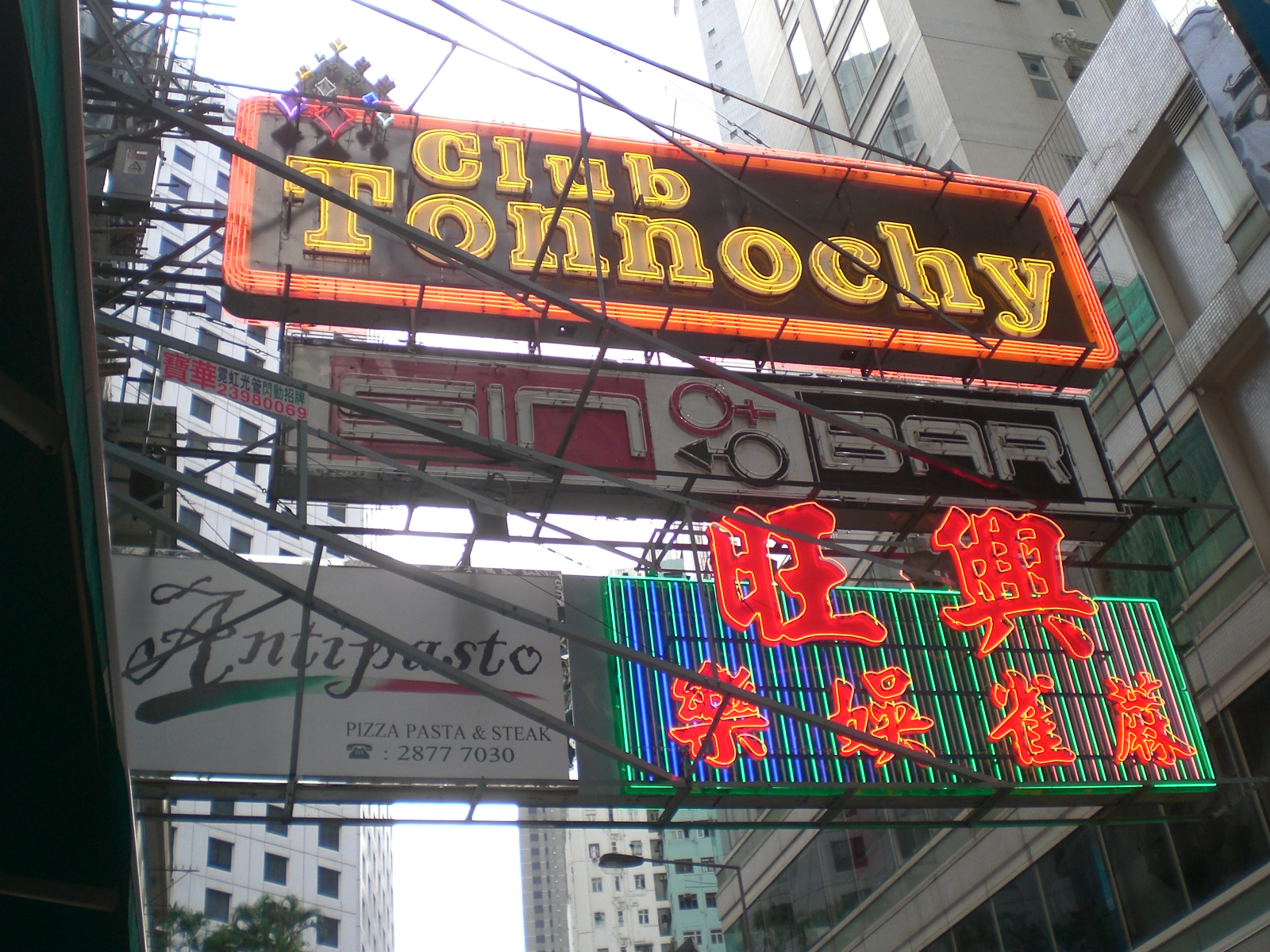
Club Tonnochy in June 2008

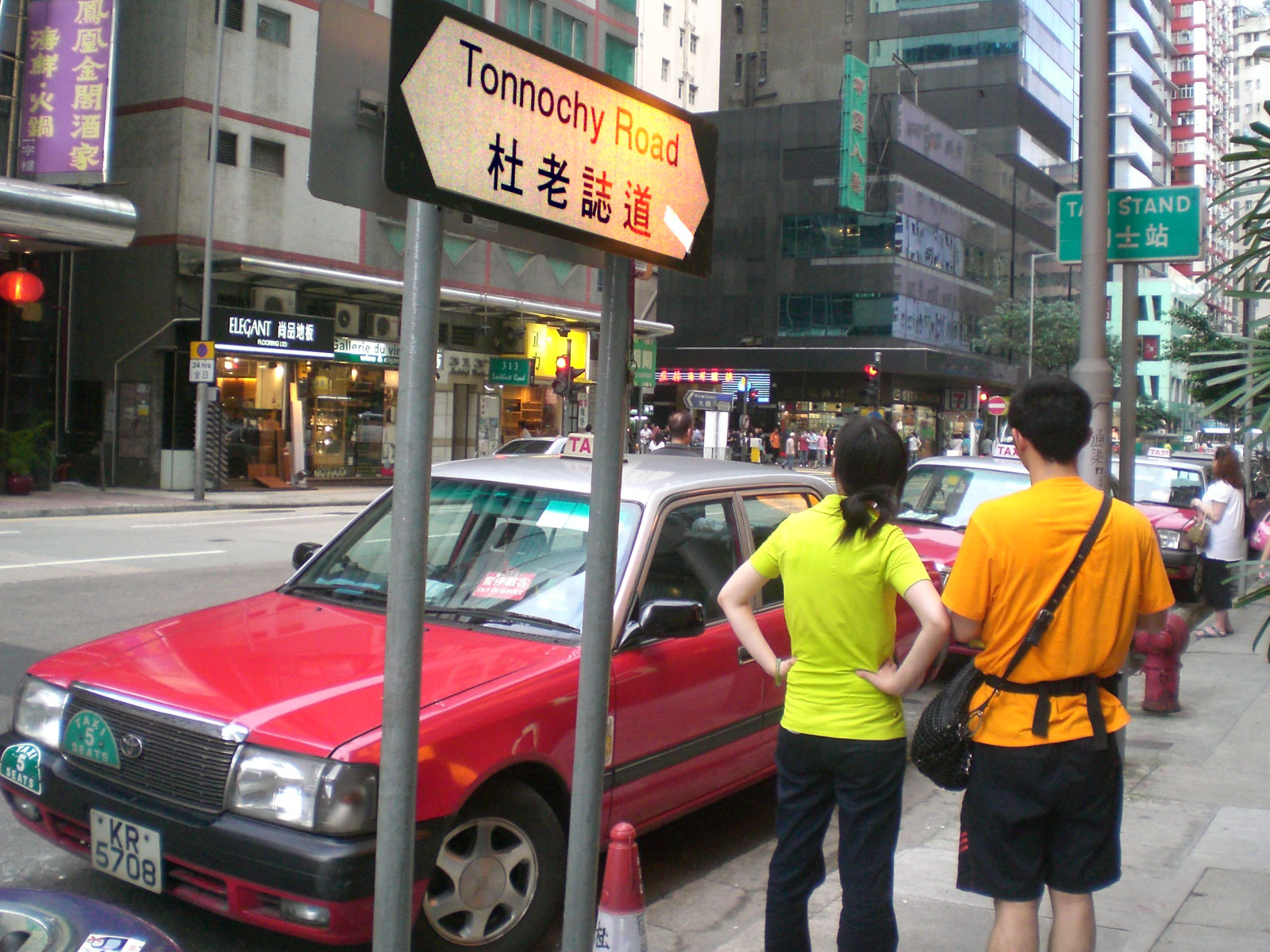
Tonnochy Road in June 2008

Tonnochy Road (Chinese: 杜老誌道) is a street in Wan Chai on the Hong Kong Island of Hong Kong. It runs from Hennessy Road, across Lockhart Road, Jaffe Road, Gloucester Road, to Hung Hing Road near Victoria Harbour. The wide Gloucester Road divides Tonnochy Road into a north and a south sections. Gloucester Road has a flyover to turn into the road at the north.

== Major building ==
Wan Chai Sports Ground is located at the road in Wan Chai North. Tonnochy Night Club on the road was a historical night club in Hong Kong.

== History ==
The reclamation of 1922 extended the shore of Wan Chai to present-day Gloucester Road. Upon completion in 1928, Tonnochy Road was one of new roads on the reclamation. It was named after Malcolm Struan Tonnochy, an acting Governor of Hong Kong from 7 to 28 March 1882.

In the 1960s, another reclamation by Hong Kong Government extended the road north to Hung Hing Road.

== In fiction ==
Tonnochy Road (also as Tonnochie and spelled Tonnochi in this version) is an important location in the computer game Deus Ex, where the protagonist gathers clues about recent incidents within Wan Chai District.

== See also ==
- List of streets and roads in Hong Kong
