= William Henry Marsh =

British colonial administrator

Sir William Henry Marsh KCMG

Administrator of Hong Kong
- In office March 1882 – March 1883
- Monarch: Queen Victoria
- Preceded by: Sir Malcolm Struan Tonnochy
- Succeeded by: Sir George Bowen
- In office 1885–1887
- Monarch: Queen Victoria
- Preceded by: Sir George Bowen
- Succeeded by: Major-General William Cameron; Administrator

Personal details
- Born: 1827
- Died: 21 July 1906
- Profession: colonial administrator

Sir William Henry Marsh KCMG (1827–21 July 1906; Chinese Translated Name: 馬殊; 馬師 also infrequently used) was a British colonial administrator, who governed Hong Kong twice. The first tenure started in March 1882, and ended in March 1883, when Sir George Bowen succeeded him as the 9th Governor of Hong Kong. The second tenure started in December 1885, and ended in April, 1887, when Major-General William Cameron succeeded him as Colonial Administrator.

== Memory ==
Marsh Road in Wan Chai, Hong Kong Island and Marsh Street in Hung Hom were named after him.

Government offices
Preceded by John Gardiner Austin	Auditor-General of Hong Kong; 1879–1887	Succeeded by Frederick Stewart
Preceded by John Gardiner Austin	Colonial Secretary of Hong Kong; 1879–1887	Succeeded by Frederick Stewart
Preceded by Sir Malcolm Struan Tonnochy	Administrator of Hong Kong; 1882–1883	Succeeded by Sir George Bowen as Governor
Preceded by Sir George Bowen as Governor	Administrator of Hong Kong; 1885–1887	Succeeded by William Gordon Cameron
