= Malcolm Struan Tonnochy =

Indian politician

Administrator of Hong Kong
- In office 1882–1882
- Monarch: Queen Victoria
- Preceded by: Sir John Pope Hennessy
- Succeeded by: Sir William Henry Marsh

Acting Colonial Treasurer
- In office 1880–1882

Acting Colonial Secretary
- In office 1880–1882

Superintendent of Victoria Gaol
- In office 1876–1882

Personal details
- Born: 5 December 1841 Bengal, British India
- Died: 14 December 1882 (aged 41) Hong Kong
- Relations: Thomas Tonnochy Esq (father); Caroline Kemball (mother)
- Profession: civil servant, colonial administrator

Malcolm Struan Tonnochy (Chinese: 杜老誌) (5 December 1841 – 14 December 1882) was an Indian colonial major official serving in British India and in Hong Kong. He was acting Governor of Hong Kong in March 1882.

== Early years ==
Tonnochy was born in Bengal, India in December 1841 to Thomas Tonnochy (a colonial collector in Bulundshahr) and Caroline Kemball. He was of Scottish and Indian extraction: his paternal grandfather was a Scot (Bengal Army Sergeant Major Thomas Tonnochie) and his paternal grandmother, Catharine, was probably Indian. His maternal grandfather was a Conductor of Ordnance and maternal grandmother most likely Indian too. He was sent to England for education at Blackheath Proprietary School followed by Trinity College, Cambridge.

== Colonial Service in Hong Kong ==
It seems that Tonnochy did not complete his studies at Cambridge, choosing instead to try for a new cadetship in the Hong Kong Civil Service, by competitive examination in 1862. In this he was successful, along with fellow candidates Cecil Clementi Smith and Walter Meredith Deane, the three of them comprising the first appointments on merit in a service that was beginning to modernise. Tonnochy worked his way up to hold many posts including Coroner, Assistant Harbour Master, Police Magistrate, acting Colonial Treasurer (when James Russell was absent), acting Colonial Secretary and as judge in the Royal Navy's Vice Admiralty Court of Hong Kong from 1879 to 1882. From 1876 to 1882 he was Superintendent of Victoria Gaol (under Hong Kong Police 1876-1879 and Hong Kong Correctional Services from 1879 to 1882). He was acting Administrator (i.e. Governor) for two short periods, in 1881 during the absence of Sir John Pope Hennessy in Peking, and in 1882 after Hennessy left office.

== Death ==
Tonnochy was unmarried and died aged 41 after serving as acting Administrator of Hong Kong in early 1882. Tonnochy is buried at Hong Kong Cemetery.

== Honours ==
Unlike most colonial officials in Hong Kong at the time, Tonnochy was never honoured with any titles. The only place that bears his name is Tonnochy Road in Wan Chai. Club Tonnochy and Tonnochy Night Club are named and located on the street named for him.

== See also ==
- Francis Henry May Superintendent of Victoria Gaol from 1896-1902

Preceded by: Sir John Pope Hennessy	Governor of Hong Kong (Administrator); 7–28 March 1882	Followed by: Sir William Henry Marsh
