= Wan Chai Cargo Handling Basin =

Former public cargo handling area in Hong Kong

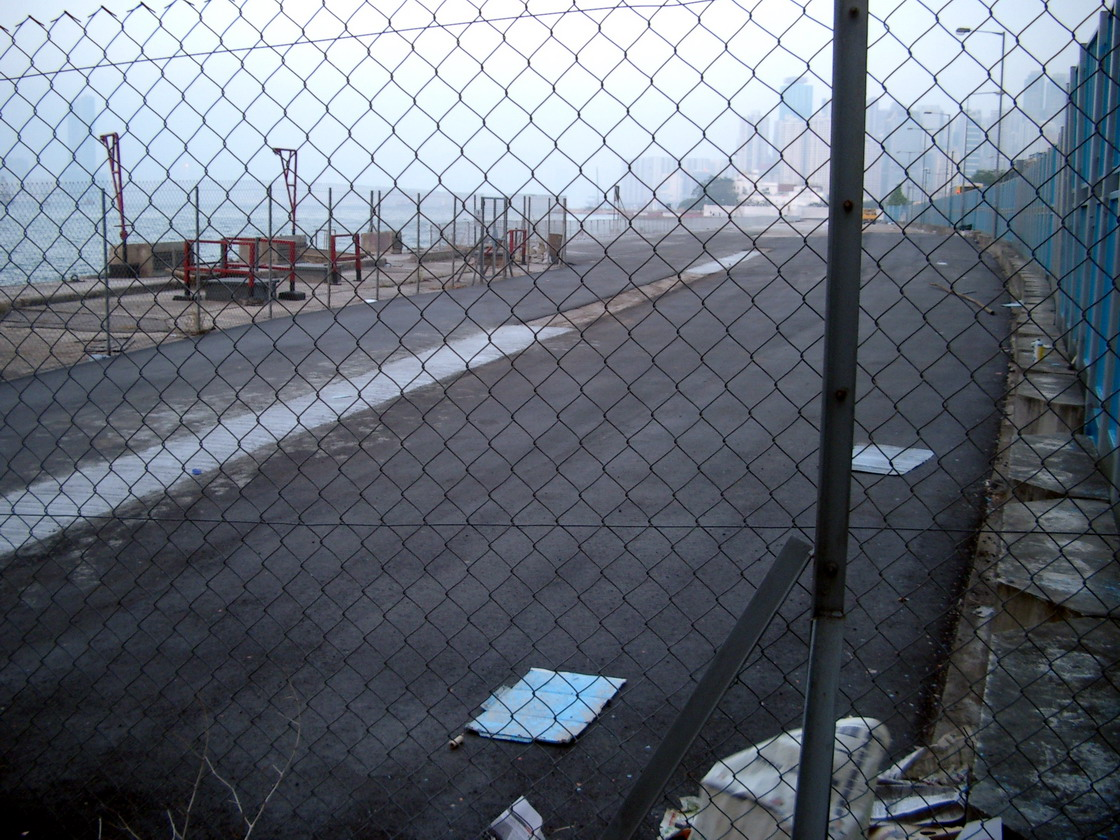
Wan Chai Cargo Handling Basin

The Wan Chai Cargo Handling Basin (Chinese: 灣仔北貨物裝卸區) is situated in Wan Chai, Hong Kong Island, Hong Kong. A prime site along Victoria Harbour, it is adjacent to the Wan Chai Sports Ground and located between the Hong Kong Convention and Exhibition Centre and the Royal Hong Kong Yacht Club. The site has been earmarked under the Central and Wan Chai Reclamation project for the construction of a highway linking Central with Causeway Bay, aimed at easing traffic congestion along the northern coast of Hong Kong Island.

As its name implies, the basin was formerly used as a public cargo handling area. Mid-stream operators transferred goods from ocean-going ships onto barges. They then sailed to the Wan Chai Cargo Handling Basin, where they transferred the goods onto trucks. The breakwater of the basin is currently used as a helipad by the Government Flying Service to replace the Central Helipad at Fenwick Street.

== History ==
Construction of the Wan Chai Cargo Handling Basin began in 1973. In 2003, the basin's cargo-handling activities were relocated to the Chai Wan Public Cargo Working Area.
