= Wan Chai Sports Ground =

Stadium in Wan Chai, Hong Kong

Coordinates: 22°16′53″N 114°10′41″E

- 灣仔運動場
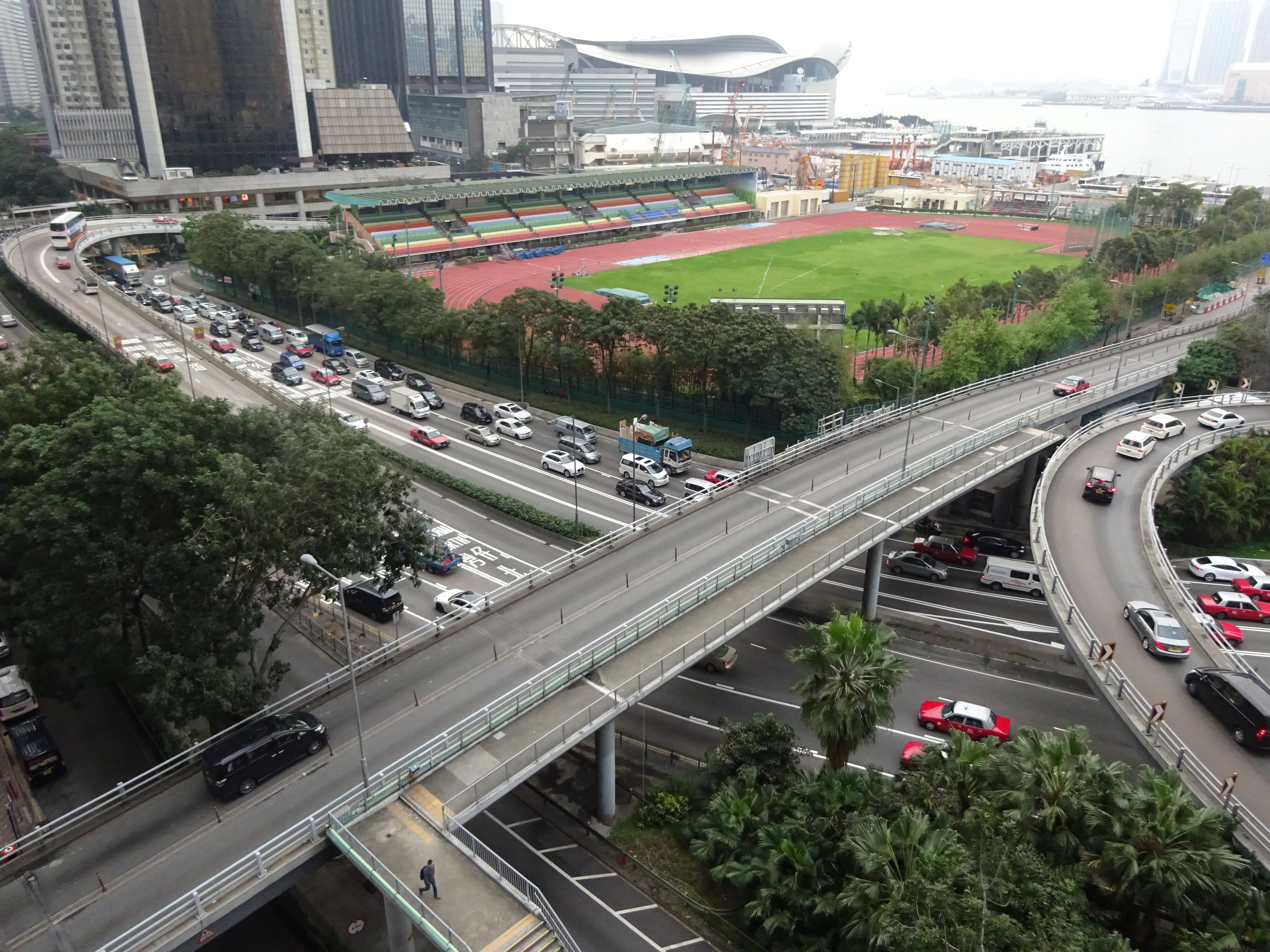
- Wan Chai Sports Ground in March 2016
- Interactive map of Wan Chai Sports Ground
- Location: Wan Chai, Hong Kong
- Operator: Leisure and Cultural Services Department
- Capacity: 2,401
- Type: Public sports ground
- Public transit: Wan Chai Ferry Pier, Wan Chai station

Construction
- Opened: 1979; 47 years ago
- Architects: Architectural Office, Public Works Department

Wan Chai Sports Ground (Chinese: 灣仔運動場) is a stadium in Wan Chai North, Hong Kong Island, Hong Kong, with a seating capacity of 2,401. It is a government-run sports ground primarily used by local schools for sports days and other athletic activities. Situated by the Victoria Harbour, it is at a convenient location next to Hong Kong's Central business district, Wan Chai, and the shopping district of Causeway Bay.

== Features ==
The sports ground has an eight-lane, 400 m, all-weather synthetic track with a natural turf infield catering for all track and field events. The measurements and markings of the track are of IAAF standards. The running track and jumping track use Conipur M full polyurethane synthetic material and are 13 mm and 20 mm thick respectively. Landing mattresses of 71 cm and 81 cm thick are provided for high jump and pole vault. Also, floodlighting of 450 lux is available.

== History ==
Wan Chai Sports Ground opened in 1979 on reclaimed land. It was originally managed by the Urban Council, and formed the Wan Chai Reclamation Recreation Centre Stage I (stage II being the adjacent swimming pool and indoor games hall). In 1996, the sports ground was used to help accommodate a queue of nearly 60,000 people seeking British Dependent Territories citizenship at Immigration Tower prior to the cut-off date of 30 March 1996 ahead of the handover.

Part of the north end of the grandstand was demolished as part of the Sha Tin to Central Link project. The railway tunnels will run under the sports ground.

=== Protest area during MC6 ===
The Wan Chai Sports Ground and the nearby Wan Chai Cargo Handling Basin were designated as protest zones for the Sixth Ministerial Conference of the World Trade Organization. The conference, abbreviated as MC6, was held in Hong Kong from 13 to 18 December 2005.

Officials expressed concerns that the protesters might destroy the sports ground, which could force a large number of schools to abandon their plans for sporting activities. However, the protest organiser, the Hong Kong People's Alliance on WTO, was unhappy with a previous proposed location for demonstrations, Southorn Playground, which is blocked by highrises from the venue of the conference, the Hong Kong Convention and Exhibition Centre.

In the end, the number of protesters was smaller than expected and were sufficiently accommodated at the cargo handling basin. Hence, the sports ground was not used as a protest site.

== HKCEC Phase III ==
Hong Kong Convention and Exhibition Centre Phase III will be developed on land now occupied by the Wan Chai pier bus terminus and Wan Chai Sports Ground. Although the existing sports facilities will be demolished, the Trade Development Council (TDC) plans to build new sports facilities on top of the HKCEC Phase III structure to serve the public interest.
