= Citybus Route 2 =

Bus route in Hong Kong

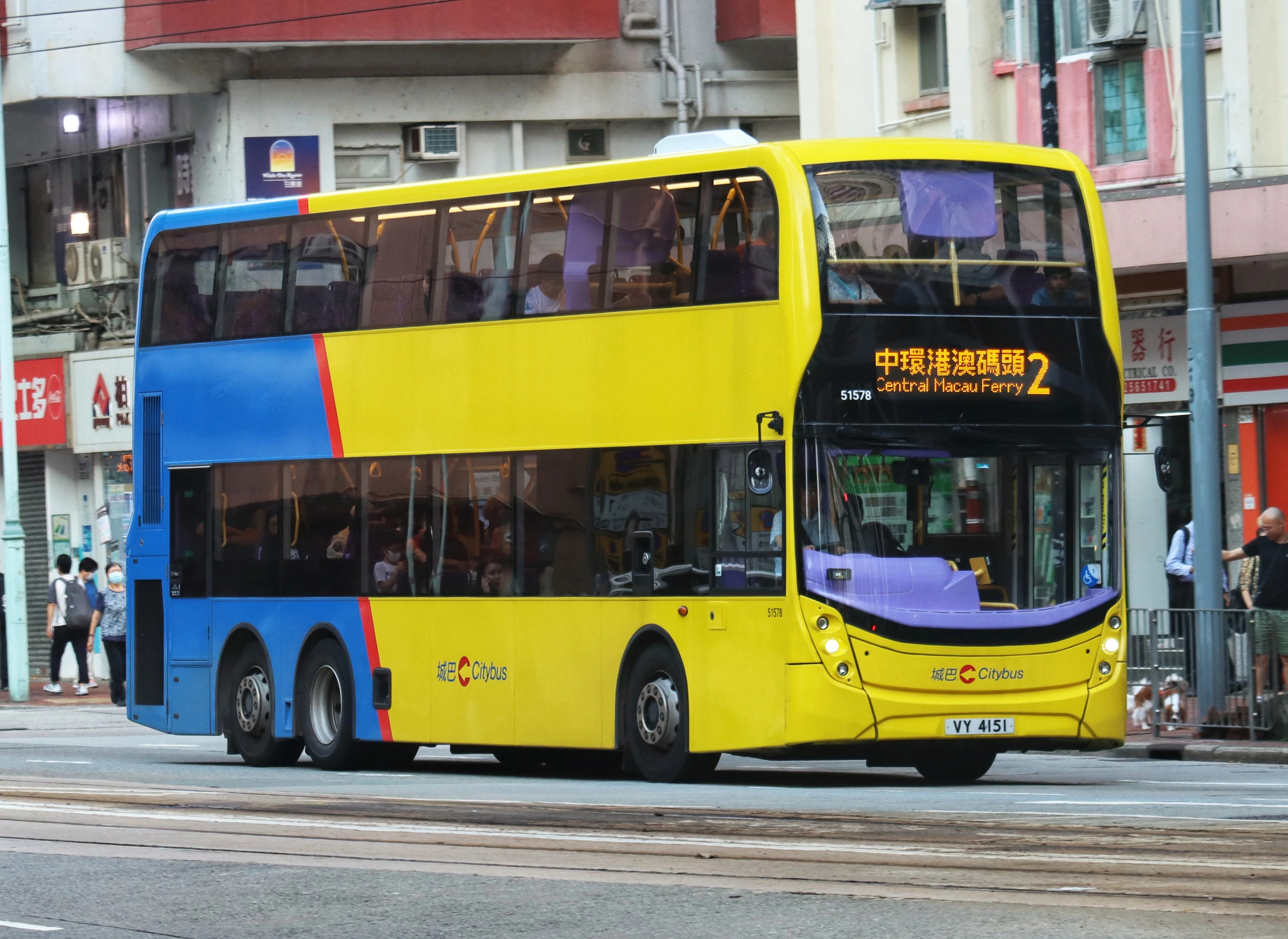
An Alexander Dennis Enviro500 MMC on route 2

Route 2 on Hong Kong Island is a bus service operated by Citybus, between Grand Promenade, Sai Wan Ho and Central (Macau Ferry) Bus Terminus, Sheung Wan.

The Route is similar to Route 720.

== History ==
The route was started in 1929 by Hong Kong Tramways between Royal Pier, Central and the east gate of Taikoo Dockyard, and had no number at that time. On 11 June 1933, China Motor Bus began operation of the route as part of its franchise of bus routes on Hong Kong Island, and the number "2" was assigned to this route. In 1934, the Central terminal was changed to HYF Ferry Pier. Since 1935, there were special daily services during the swimming season to the swimming yards at North Point.

During the Japanese occupation, service on the route was suspended. On 16 March 1947, service was resumed, with the Central terminus at Central Ferry Piers. In February 1948, there were five buses servicing the route, increased to ten in July, and a frequency of five minute per bus was achieved by November. Later the frequency was further increased to four minutes per bus, with 17 buses serving the route. Starting from 12 November 1949 the route was extended to Shau Kei Wan. In mid-1951, a short service between Central Ferry Piers and North Point was started, but was soon replaced by a new route 10 on 1 August 1951. In 1959, the service time was extended to 00:30 for the convenience of night ferry passengers. On 16 April 1962 service time was further extended to 01:20 in response to the extension of service time by HYF. On 16 June 1962, the Central terminus was changed to Jubilee Street.

In 1962, the first CMB double-decker, the Roline, started service on the route. On 22 January 1963, service of the first six CMB double-deckers started on Route 2. Because of the high level of patronage, CMB later had to introduce a large number of Guy Arab V double-deckers to operate this route.

On 21 October 1968, a special express service with no number was started, with a yellow sign that said "EXPRESS" hanging at every bus stop the express service serves. In early 1970 the service was designated an express service of Route 2. On 1 November 1973, the express service was cancelled and replaced by the newly designated route 20.

Route 2 was classified as an urban flat-road route in 1972, with a ticket price the cheapest amongst the then three types of CMB routes. In the same year the first rear-powered bus in Hong Kong, a Daimler "Jumbo" (RXF1, later SF1) was assigned to the route. The Central terminus was changed to Hong Kong-Macau Ferry Pier on 1 September 1982. In 1985, the terminal at Shau Kei Wan was moved to a newly constructed one. The completion of Island line caused a drop of patronage on the route.

On 1 September 1998, the route was handed over to NWFB with the franchise of CMB ended. In 2000 the route was designated a full air-conditioned route. On 3 June 2001, the route was changed to run via Gloucester Road for the westbound direction to Central, instead of Hennessy Road as part of NWFB's rearrangement of bus services, and the eastern terminus was changed to Aldrich Bay. On 30 June 2002, the Aldrich Bay direction started to serve the new Central Ferry Piers, and on 13 July 2003 even the eastbound direction to Aldrich started to use Gloucester Road. On 24 June 2006, the eastern terminus of the route was moved to the newly opened bus terminal under Grand Promenade.

== Fare ==
Full Fare:$4.9

From Tai On House to Sai Wan Ho (Grand Promenade):$4.3

== Route ==
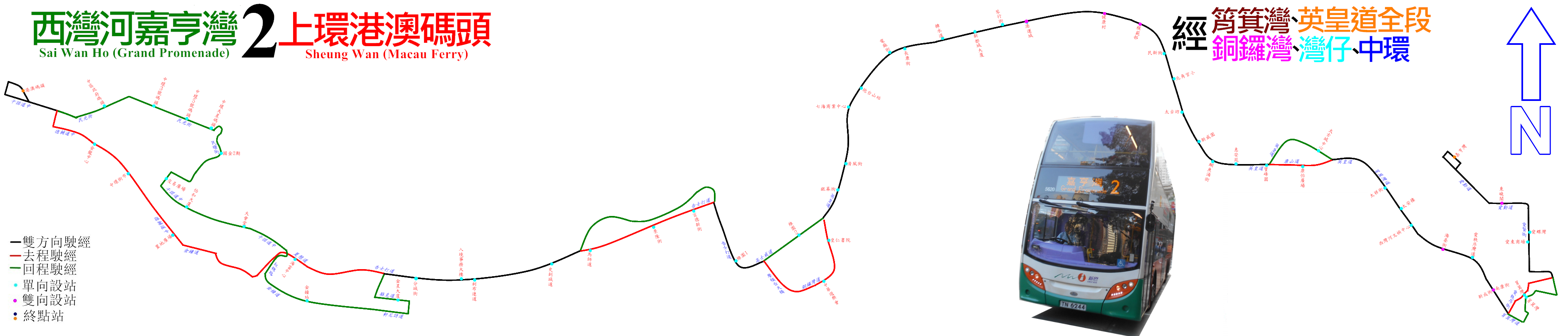
The wiring diagram of this line

Start at Sai Wan Ho (Grand Promenade)			Start at Central (Macau Ferry)		
No.	Name of Bus Stop	Place	No.	Name of Bus Stop	Place
1	Sai Wan Ho (Grand Promenade)	Bus Terminus	1	Central (Macau Ferry)	Bus Terminus
2	Tung Yuk Court Tung Hiu House	Oi Kan Road	2	Central Government Pier	Man Kwong Street
3	Aldrich Garden	Oi Yin Street	3	Central Pier No.3	Man Kwong Street
4	Shau Kei Wan	Bus Terminus	4	Central Pier No.5	Man Kwong Street
5	Sun Shing Street	Shau Kei Wan Road	5	Central Star Ferry	Man Kwong Street
6	Hoi An Street	Shau Kei Wan Road	6	Two International Finance Centre	Man Yiu Street
7	Sai Wan Ho Civic Centre	Shau Kei Wan Road	7	Central (Exchange Square)	Bus Terminus
8	Tai Cheung Street	Shau Kei Wan Road	8	Jardine House	Connaught Road Central
9	Kornhill Garden	Kornhill Road	9	City Hall	Connaught Road Central
10	Po Fung Garden	King’s Road	10	Admiralty Station	Queensway
11	Quarry Bay Street	King’s Road	11	Golden Star Building	Lockhart Road
12	Taikoo Place	King’s Road	12	Immigration Tower	Gloucester Road
13	Mansion Street	King’s Road	13	Victoria Park	Gloucester Road
14	Model Estate	King’s Road	14	Victoria Park	Causeway Bay Road
15	Healthy Village	King’s Road	15	Ngan Mok Street	King’s Road
16	Island Place	King’s Road	16	7 Seas Shopping Centre	King’s Road
17	Metropole Building	King’s Road	17	Tin Chong Street	King’s Road
18	Cheung Hong Street	King’s Road	18	Tong Shui Road	King’s Road
19	Fortress Hill Station	King’s Road	19	Kam Hong Street	King’s Road
20	Tsing Fung Street	King’s Road	20	Island Place	King’s Road
21	Queen’s College	Tung Lo Wan Road	21	Healthy Village	King’s Road
22	Chinese Recreation Club	Tung Lo Wan Road	22	Model Estate	King’s Road
23	Patterson Street	Gloucester Road	23	North Point Government School	King’s Road
24	Cannon Street	Gloucester Road	24	Sunway Garden	King’s Road
25	Marsh Road	Gloucester Road	25	Westlands Gardens	King’s Road
26	Tonnochy Road	Gloucester Road	26	Tai Koo Shing Plaza	King’s Road
27	O’ Brien Road	Gloucester Road	27	Tai On House	Shau Kei Wan Road
28	Fenwick Road	Gloucester Road	28	Hoi An Street	Shau Kei Wan Road
29	Admiralty Centre	Harcourt Road	29	Aldrich Bay Road	Shau Kei Wan Road
30	The Landmark	Des Voeux Road Central	30	Nam Hong Street	Shau Kei Wan Road
31	Central Market	Des Voeux Road Central	31	Shau Kei Wan	Bus Terminus
32	Golden Centre	Des Voeux Road Central	32	Oi Tung Shopping Centre	Oi Yin Street
33	Central (Macau Ferry)	Bus Terminus	33	Tung Yuk Court Tung Hiu House	Oi Kan Road
			34	Sai Wan Ho (Grand Promenade)	Bus Terminus
