= Great Eagle =

Great Eagle may refer to:

- Great Eagle (car company), an American automobile manufacturer from 1910 to 1915
- Great Eagle Holdings, a Hong Kong real estate company
- Great Eagle Centre, an office building in Hong Kong
- Maimonides (1138–1204), Sephardic Jewish philosopher, astronomer and personal physician to Saladin, sometimes known as "haNesher haGadol" ("the Great Eagle")
- Jacob Pavlovich Adler (1855–1926), Jewish actor nicknamed "nesher hagadol" ("the Great Eagle")
- The Great Eagle, leader of the Eagles in Middle-earth in J. R. R. Tolkien's fictional universe; the beings are often referred to collectively as the "Great Eagles"
- Great Eagle, a supernatural being in Native American Chumash traditional narratives
- Great Eagle, a totem animal who advises the protagonist of Yakari, a Franco-Belgian comic book series

== See also ==
- The riddle of the Great Eagle in Ezekiel 17 in the Old Testament
