= The Langham, Seattle =

Future high-rise hotel in Seattle, Washington, U.S.

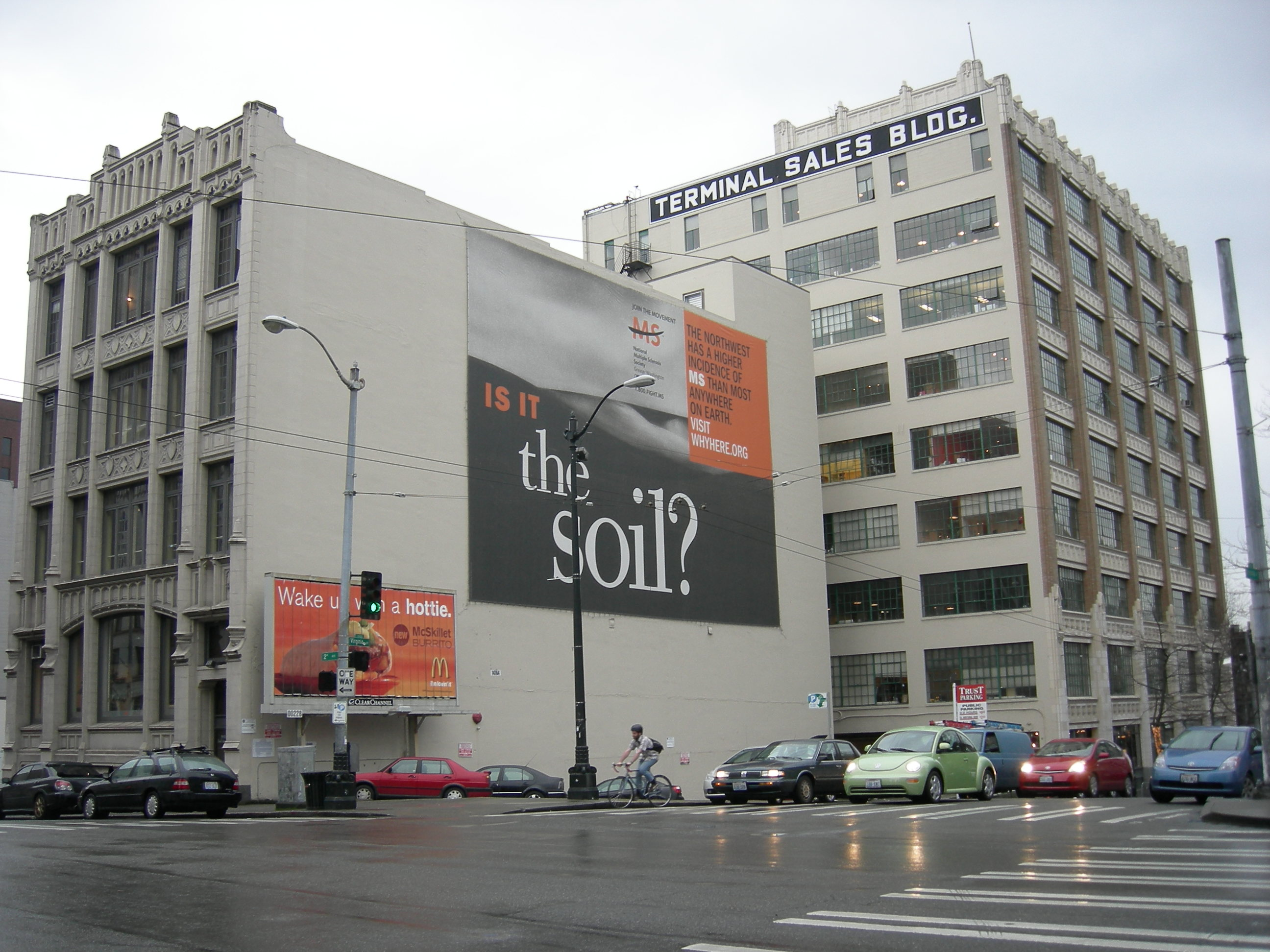
- The Terminal Sales Annex in 2008

- Location within downtown Seattle
- Hotel chain: Langham

General information
- Status: Proposed
- Type: Hotel, Residential
- Location: 1931 2nd Avenue; Seattle, Washington, U.S.
- Coordinates: 47°36′41″N 122°20′30″W
- Estimated completion: 2030
- Owner: Langham Hospitality Group

Height
- Height: 484 feet (148 m)

Technical details
- Size: 552,000 square feet (51,300 m^{2})
- Floor count: 42

Design and construction
- Architecture firm: Kengo Kuma & Associates, Ankrom Moisan Architects
- Developer: Pacific Eagle

Other information
- Number of rooms: 187

The Langham, Seattle is a future high-rise luxury hotel in Seattle, Washington, United States. It is scheduled to open in 2026 with 187 rooms and suites operated by the Langham Hospitality Group. The 42-story building will incorporate the facade of the Terminal Sales Annex, a historic landmark on the site at 1931 2nd Avenue. The building was designed by Kengo Kuma & Associates and Ankrom Moisan Architects.

== History ==
The project, originally named Hotel Clare, was announced in 2014 by Columbia West Properties and Pineapple Hospitality with the sale of the southwest corner of 2nd and Virginia for $16 million. A 24-story condominium tower with 175 units was approved by the city government for the site in 2006 and was later revised to 39 stories in response to a zoning change. Columbia West proposed a 39-story high-rise on the site in 2008 as part of a twin residential and hotel project but later abandoned plans. The initial design, made by Ankrom Moisan Architects in 2015, was a 17-story hotel with 208 rooms and retail that would incorporate the Terminal Sales Annex. Pacific Eagle, the U.S. arm of Hong Kong–based real estate company Great Eagle Holdings, acquired the property in December 2016 for $18 million.

Pacific Eagle unveiled new plans for a 42-story hotel on the site in 2018 and hired Tokyo-based Kengo Kuma & Associates to redesign the project. The submitted design included 242 hotel rooms, 209 condominium units, two levels of co-working space, and 6,700 square feet (620 m^{2}). Following an initial design review meeting, the tower's footprint was reduced and a large mural was added to the side of the Terminal Sales Annex, which would jut out from the bottom of the building. The co-working element of the project was dropped in 2020 and replaced with co-living spaces in response to the COVID-19 pandemic. The Downtown Seattle Design Review Board formally approved development of the project in November 2021.

In September 2022, the Langham Hospitality Group announced that it would acquire the project and operate the hotel as The Langham, Seattle. Construction was originally scheduled to be complete in 2026. By May 2025, construction had not yet begun and the opening date of the hotel was delayed to 2030.

== Design ==
The Langham, Seattle is planned to be 42 stories tall with 187 luxury hotel rooms and suites and 200 apartments. Its design, a collaboration between Kengo Kuma and local firm Ankrom Moisan Architects, uses a series of setbacks to reference the Art Deco and Gothic Revival architecture of historic buildings in Downtown Seattle. The landmarked facade of the Terminal Sales Annex will be incorporated into the new building, protruding from the base, and its interior will be remade into amenity spaces. The top of the Terminal Sales Annex will be converted into an outdoor terrace used by hotel patrons. An automated parking garage under the tower will have space for 158 vehicles and 250 bicycles.
