= Langham Place (Hong Kong) =

Commercial complex in Mong Kok, Hong Kong

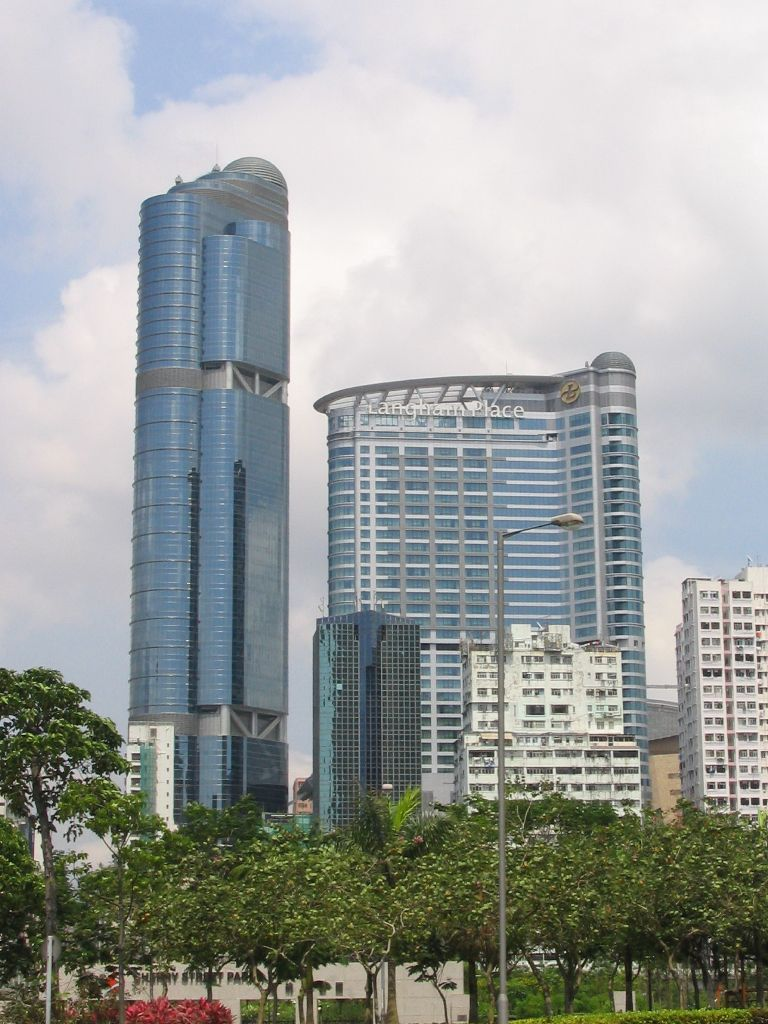
- The office and hotel, Langham Place, Hong Kong

General information
- Status: Completed
- Type: Commercial offices
- Location: 8 Argyle Street; Mong Kok, Hong Kong
- Coordinates: 22°19′5.35″N 114°10′5.11″E
- Construction started: 1999; 27 years ago
- Completed: 2004; 22 years ago
- Opening: December 2004; 21 years ago (soft opening); 25 January 2005; 21 years ago (official opening)
- Owner: Champion REIT

Height
- Roof: 255.1 m (837 ft)

Technical details
- Floor count: 59; 5 below ground
- Floor area: 65,000 m^{2} (700,000 sq ft)
- Lifts/elevators: 18

Design and construction
- Architect: Jerde Placemaking + Wong & Ouyang (HK) Ltd.
- Developer: Great Eagle Group; Urban Renewal Authority
- Structural engineer: Arup

Chinese name
- Traditional Chinese: 朗豪坊
Transcriptions
Standard Mandarin
- Hanyu Pinyin: Lǎngháo Fāng
- Gwoyeu Romatzyh: Laanghaur Fang
- Wade–Giles: Lang^{3}-hao^{2} Fang^{1}
Yue: Cantonese
- Yale Romanization: Longhòuhfōng
- Jyutping: Long3hou4fong1
- IPA: [lɔ̄ːŋ hȍu fɔ́ːŋ]

Langham Place is a commercial complex and shopping centre in Mong Kok, Kowloon, Hong Kong. The official opening was on 25 January 2005. The complex occupies two blocks defined by Argyle Street, Portland Street, Shantung Street and Reclamation Street. Shanghai Street separates the two portions of the complex, which are connected via two overhead walkways. A hotel is on one side of the development while the commercial elements are located on the other side.

The complex was the result of an urban renewal project under Land Development Corporation, later known as Urban Renewal Authority (URA). Several city blocks, including the old "Bird Street" marketplace, were demolished to make way for the commercial complex.

Langham Place Tower has a gross floor area of 17,000 m^{2} (180,000 sq ft), and comprises a 59-storey office tower, a 15-level shopping centre with two basement levels, a 665-room hotel and a car park with 250 parking spaces. The complex is connected to the Mong Kok station of the MTR via an underground passage (Exit C3).

== History ==
The HK$10 billion project began as a 50:50 joint development between Great Eagle and the Urban Renewal Authority (URA).

The plan to redevelop part of the Mong Kok landscape was driven by the URA. To make way for Langham Place, the old "Bird Street" (雀仔街) at Hong Lok Street, home to many grassroots birdsellers, was demolished.

The joint venture had spent some HK$4.4 billion to acquire the 12,000 m^{2} (129,167 sq ft) site since approximately 1989. Before the completion of the project, Great Eagle purchased the URA's stake, increasing its ownership to 100%. It was the single largest project undertaken by Great Eagle, which had geared up significantly to finance the project. An estimated HK$300 million land premium was paid by Great Eagle to the Government. In 2005, wishing to reduce debt levels, Great Eagle sold 4 individual floors of the Langham Place Office Tower.

In June 2008, Champion REIT acquired the Langham Place Mall and Great Eagle's remaining portion of the Langham Place Office Tower for HK$12.5 billion. The consideration valued the retail portion at HK$12,519 per square foot and the office portion at about HK$6,815. Great Eagle retains ownership of the hotel.

== Office tower ==
The office tower is a 255.1 m (837 ft) skyscraper and was the tallest office building on the Kowloon peninsula when it launched.

Construction of the office tower, which contains 7,200 m^{2} (78,000 sq ft) of space, began in 1999 under the design of Wong & Ouyang and the Jerde Partnership and was completed in 2004. The office tower has 59 floors above ground and 5 underground floors which are used as a car park. Each of the floors above ground has a floor plate of approximately 1,600 m^{2} (17,200 sq ft).

The office tower is one of the ten tallest office buildings in Hong Kong when measured up to the highest architectural point, which is the dome. The tower's dome illuminates at night and changes colour slowly in a light show on weekends and holidays. The entire tower is covered in light-reflecting blue glass which is separated at two intervals by grey glass.

== Shopping mall ==
Langham Place Mall
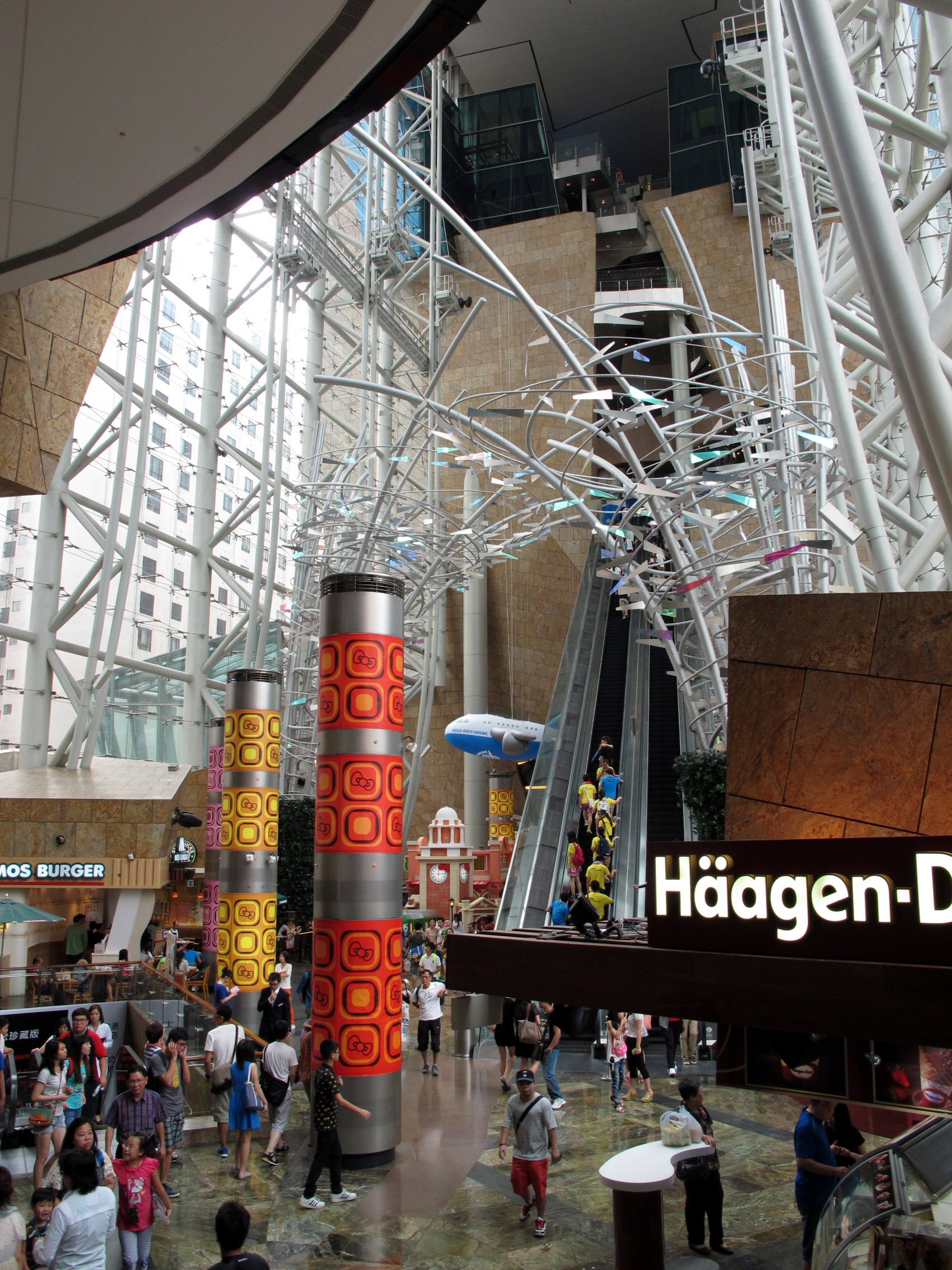
- Langham Place "Xpresscalators" to the 4th floor
- Opened: 17 November 2004; 21 years ago
- Developer: Great Eagle Group, Urban Renewal Authority
- Owner: Champion REIT
- Floor area: 60,000 m^{2} (650,000 sq ft)
- Floors: 15
- Website: langhamplace.com.hk

Due to the high price of land and the higher yield on retail property in Hong Kong, the Langham Place Mall departs from the common Western model of the flat shopping mall. It is the second "vertical mall" in Hong Kong. The exterior of the mall is characterised by a multi-faceted façade of yellow fissured Brazilian granite stretching from street level to the roof. Another distinctive feature is the 9-storey glass atrium which lets in natural lighting and allows passersby to look through the middle of the building.

The Mall's 56,000 m^{2} (600,000 sq ft) of retail space is configured over 15 levels, with 5,600 m^{2} (60,000 sq ft) of space per level from the second basement level to fourth level; and 3,700 m^{2} (40,000 sq ft) of space per level from level 5 upwards. There is a food court on level 4 and a cinema run by CINEMA CITY on level 8 and an "indoor alfresco dining" area on the top floor.

The mall was designed by the Los Angeles-based firm Jerde Partnership and opened for business in November 2004.

=== Architectural features ===
Happy Man – The 2,700-kilogram sculpture commissioned from American designer Larry Bell, at the front entrance of the arcade.

Xpresscalators – The longest escalators within a shopping mall in the territory. A pair of them is located on the 4th floor leading up to the 8th floor, where another pair leads to the 12th floor. Together they allow shoppers to travel 76 m (249 ft) up to the top of the mall quickly and conveniently, thus reducing the "horizontal drift" of shoppers.

The Spiral – A section of the shopping mall from the 8th to 12th floor of the building, which corkscrews around the upper set of Xpresscalators.

Digital Sky – An architectural feature on level 13 where computerised images are projected onto the ceiling of the mall. The lighting was originally designed and programmed by Jason Saunders of Photonic-Motion in Melbourne Australia, in sequence with video on a Wholehog 2 PC running midi time code.

=== Escalator accident ===
On 25 March 2017, the 45-metre (148 ft) long escalator that carries passengers from the fourth to eighth floor failed. With 120 people on board, it reversed direction and sent people careering downward at high speed for about 15 seconds before slowing. A human pile-up formed at the bottom of the escalator and at least 17 people were injured.

A subsequent Electrical and Mechanical Services Department (EMSD) investigation found that the main drive chain had broken, while the safety device designed to monitor the integrity of the drive chain had also failed. It said that these failures had led to the inactivation of the auxiliary brake that would have otherwise stopped the escalator. On 9 March 2018, the Otis Elevator Company (HK) Limited, the contractor responsible for maintaining the escalator, pleaded guilty to several charges of contravening provisions of the Lifts and Escalators Ordinance. The company was fined HK$320,000 by the court. EMSD announced it would continue disciplinary action against the contractor.

== Langham Place Hotel ==
The Langham Place Hotel is located at 555, Shanghai Street. Managed by the Langham Hotels International, it is the only five star hotel located in Mong Kok and has a swimming pool on its roof. Its 42 floors houses 280 deluxe, 284 executive, and 101 Langham Hotel Club guest rooms.

On 26 August 2015, the Langham Place Hotel was rebranded as the Cordis, Hong Kong.

== Gallery ==
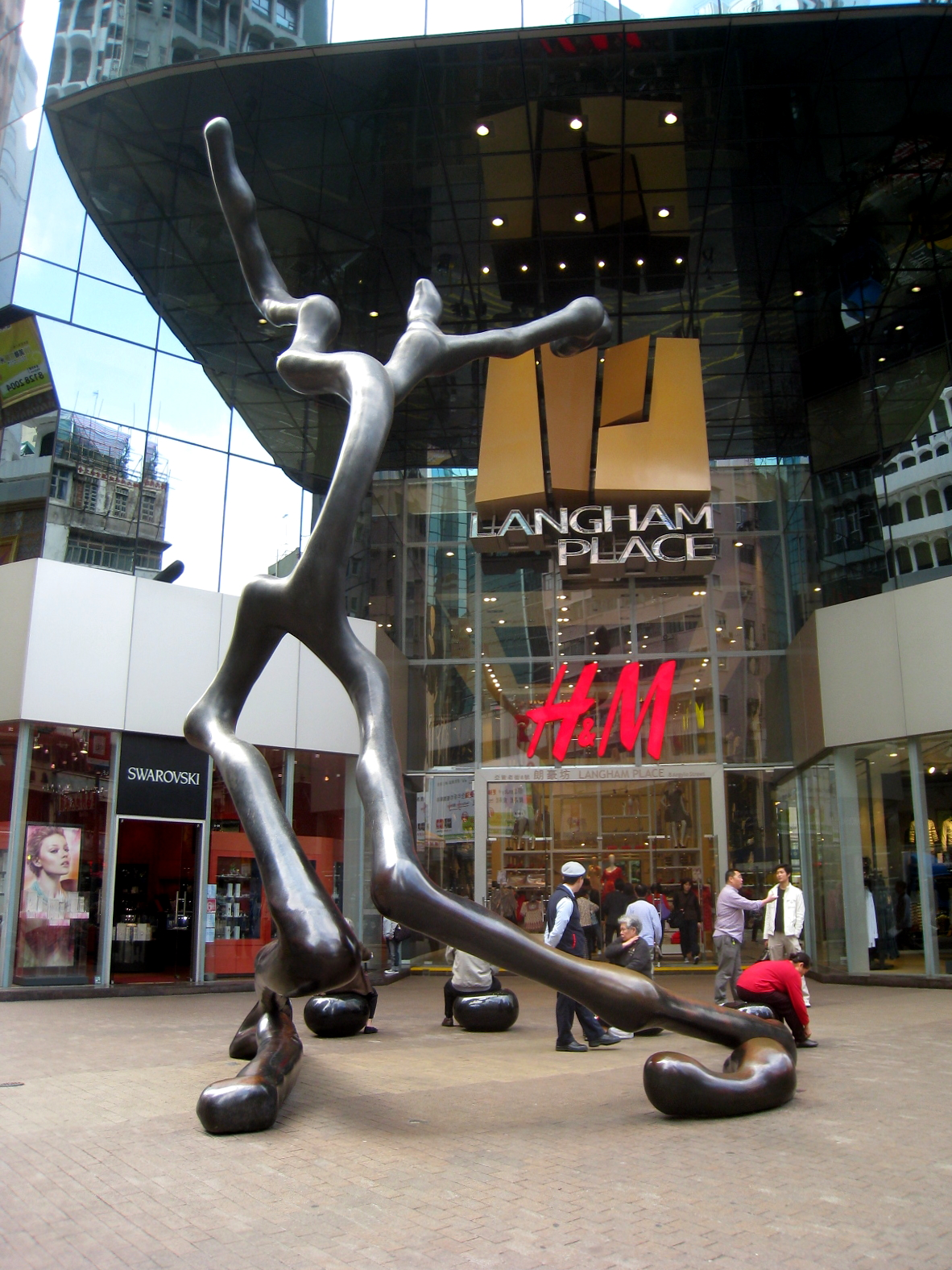
Happy Man

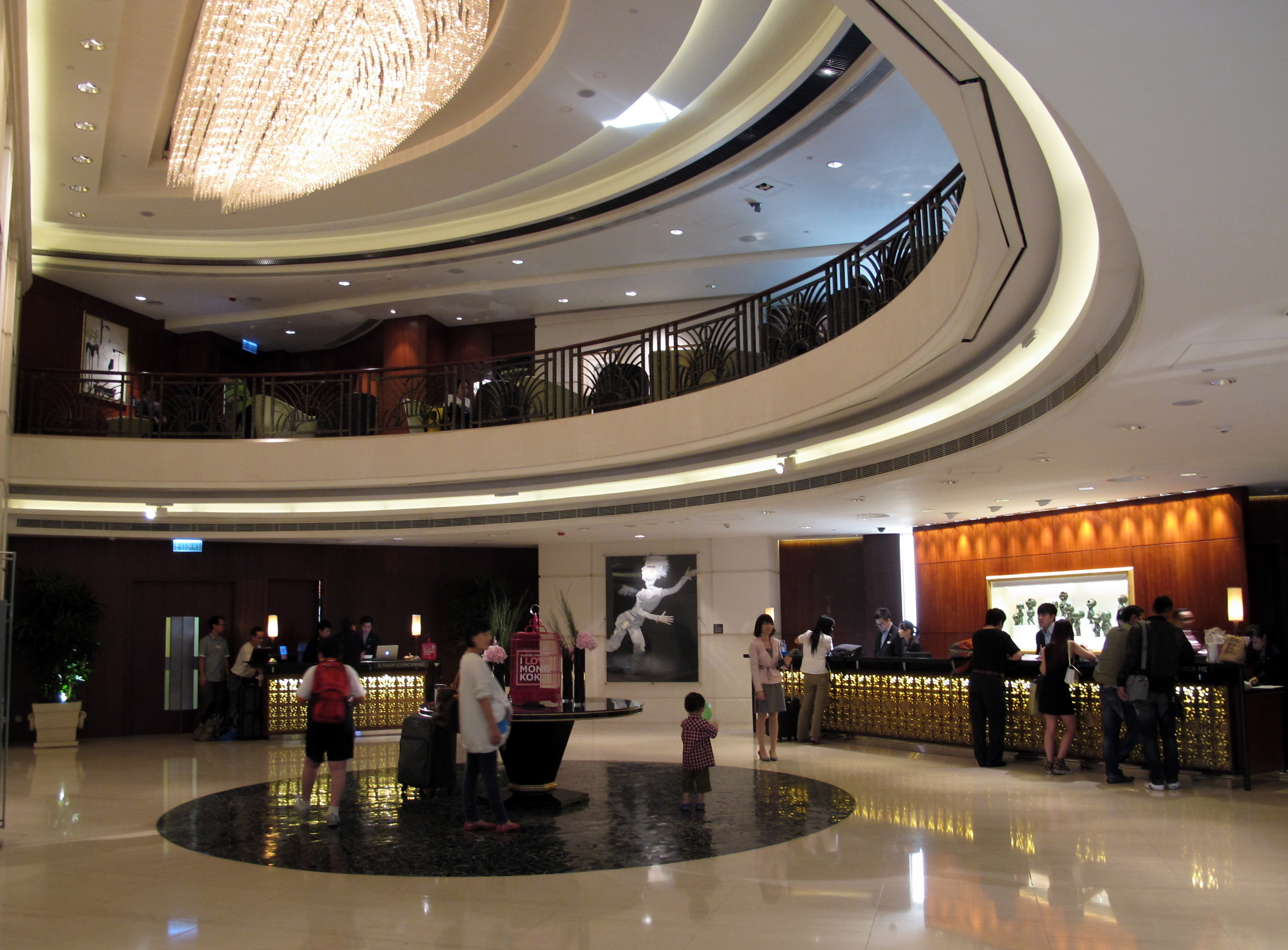
Langham Hotel Lobby

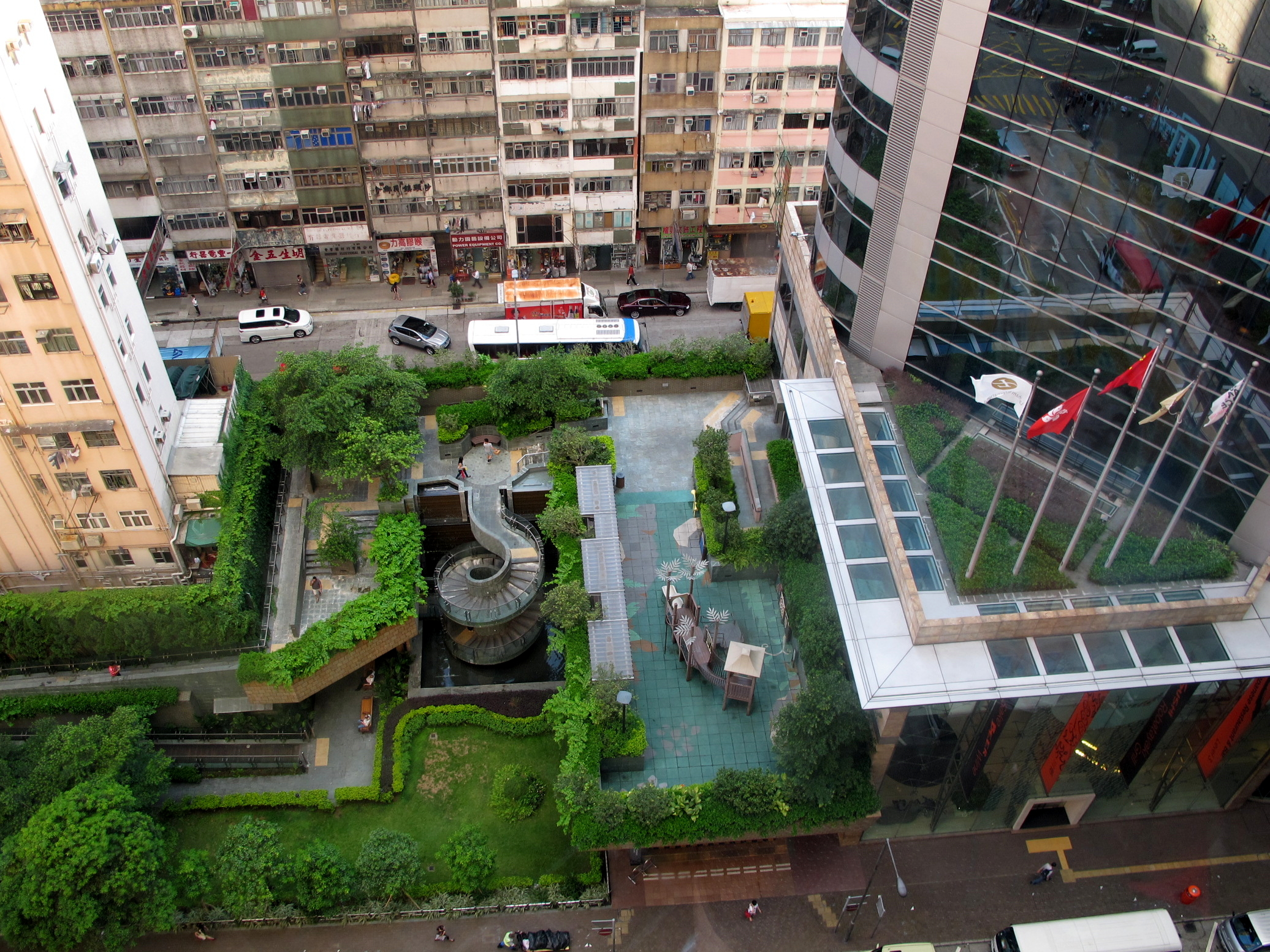
Public open space near Langham Hotel

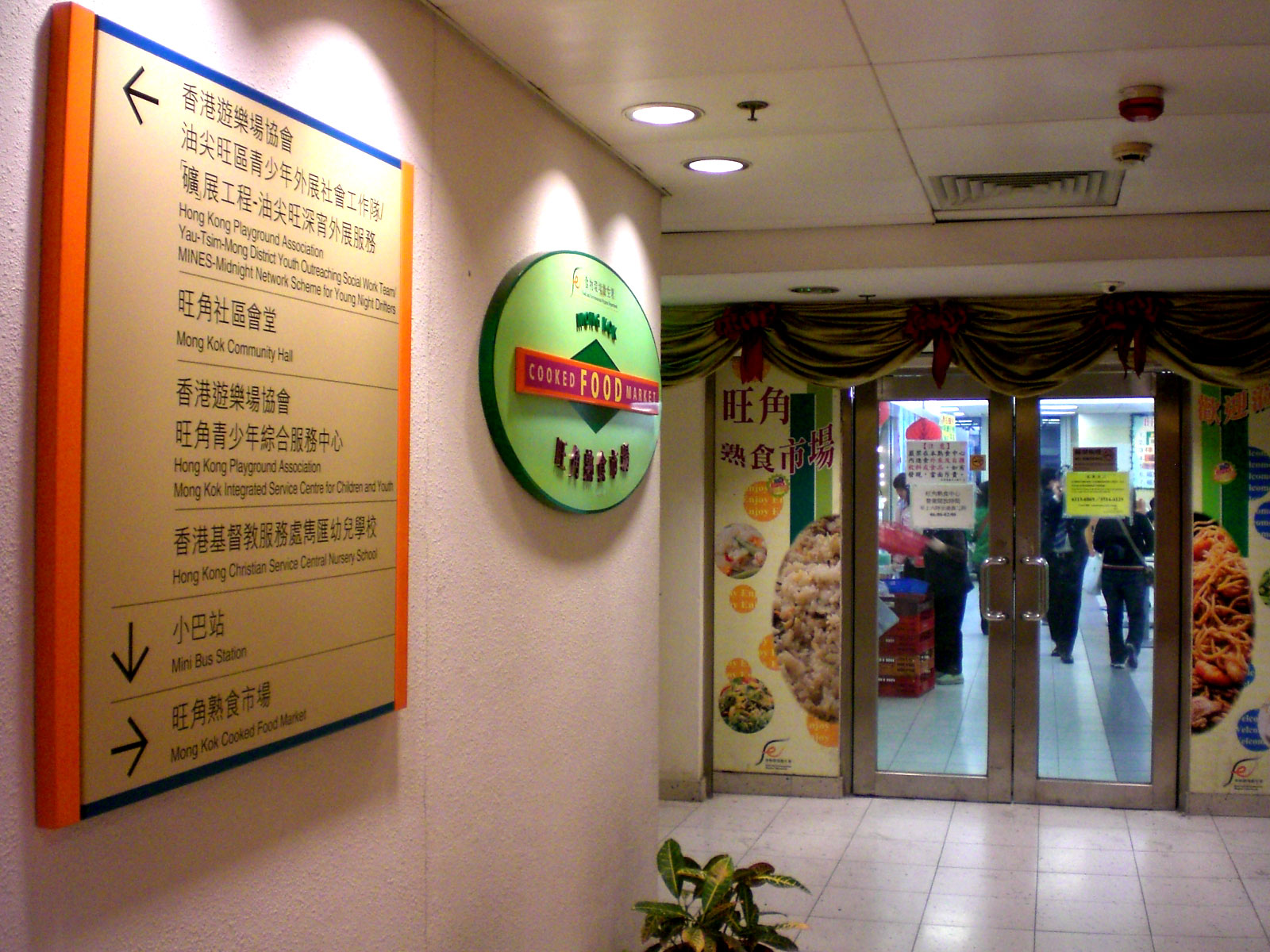
Cooked Food Market inside Mong Kok Complex

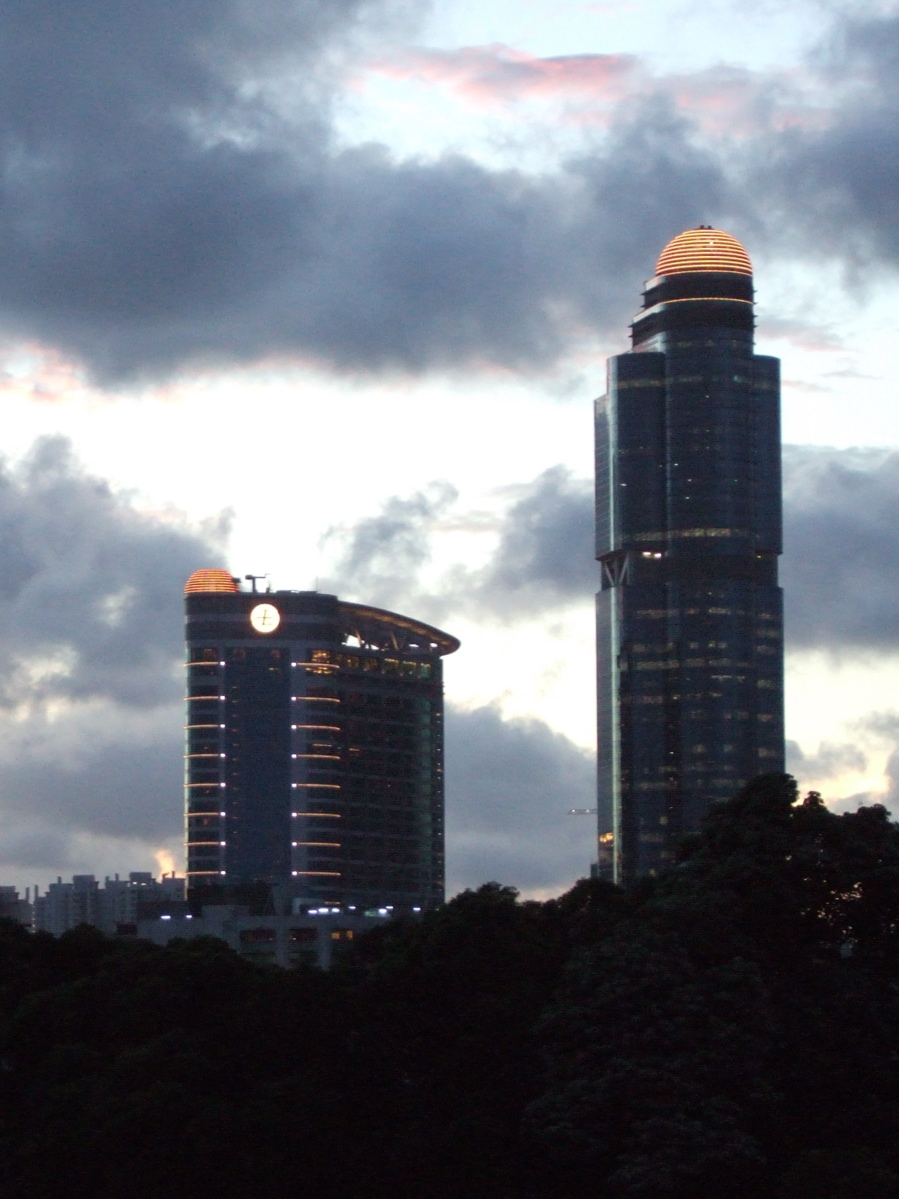
The Langham Place towers, viewed from King's Park

== Cultural references ==
The building was used as the main background for 2 TVB drama series Under the Canopy of Love (2006) and Queen of the Office (2010).

For the filming of episode 72 of Running Man, the Langham Place's shopping mall was originally going to be used as a location for a Running Man challenge. However, after learning of the proposed filming site at Langham Place, many fans gathered at the mall, leading to an overcrowding and made it impossible to shoot an episode.

== Transportation ==
Exit C3 of the adjacent Mong Kok station connects directly to the basement levels of the Langham Place shopping centre. Exit E1 of the station is located at ground level next to the complex.

== See also ==
- Yau Tsim Mong District
- List of tallest buildings in Hong Kong
- Langham Square, a shopping and residential complex in Markham, Ontario which uses Langham Place's Chinese name Chinese: 朗豪坊
