= Three Garden Road, Central =

- 花園道三號
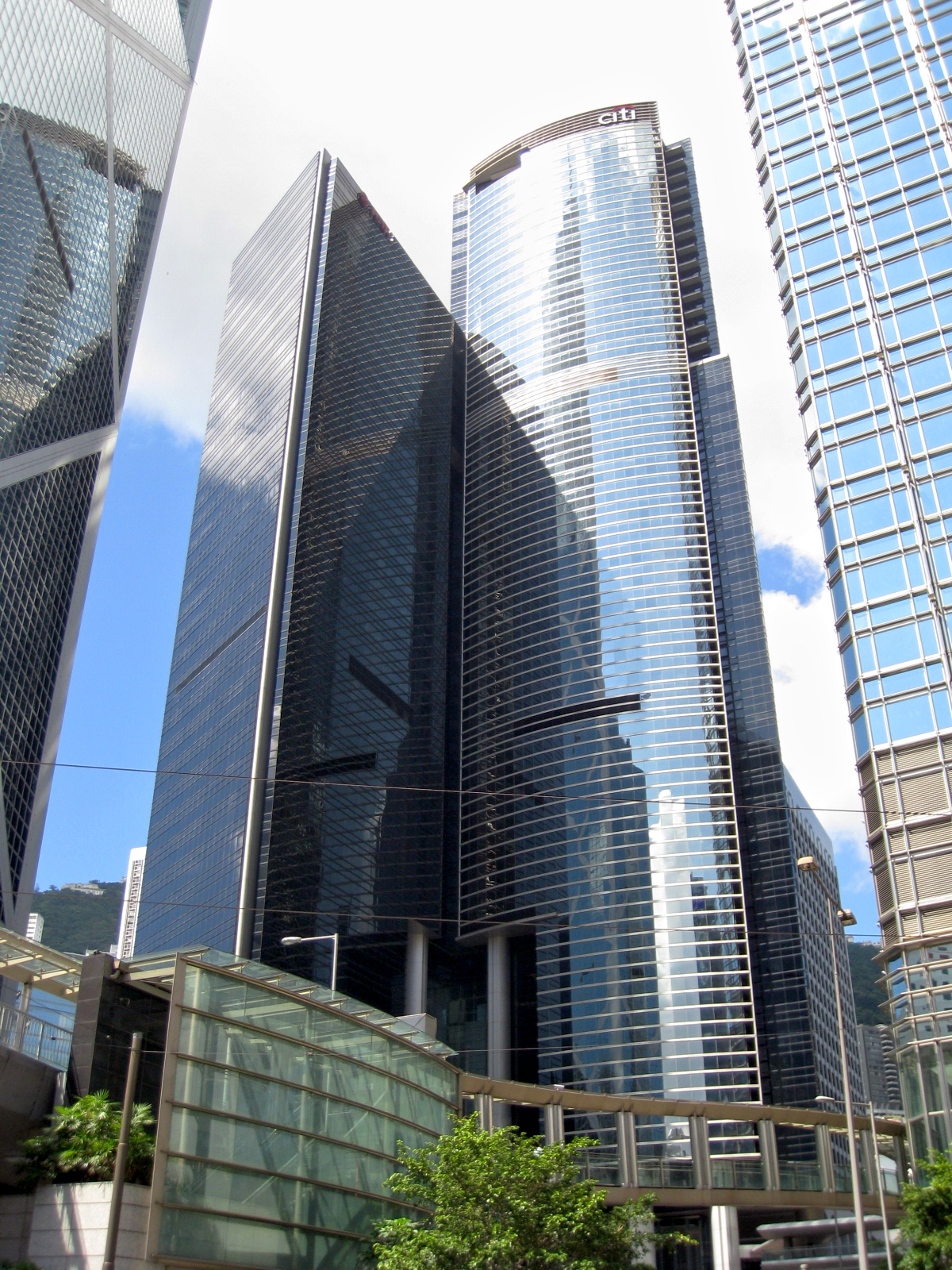

- Location within Hong Kong

General information
- Status: Completed
- Type: Office
- Location: 3 Garden Road; Central, Hong Kong
- Coordinates: 22.2787°N 114.1607°E
- Opened: 1992; 34 years ago
- Owner: Champion REIT

Height
- Roof: 205 m

Technical details
- Floor count: 47
- Floor area: 1,559,000 sq ft (144,800 m^{2})

Design and construction
- Architect: Rocco Design Architects
- Main contractor: Sung Foo Kee

Three Garden Road, Central
- Traditional Chinese: 花園道三號
- Simplified Chinese: 花园道三号
Transcriptions
Standard Mandarin
- Hanyu Pinyin: Huāyuándào Sānháo
Yue: Cantonese
- Jyutping: faa1 jyun4 dou6 saam1 hou6

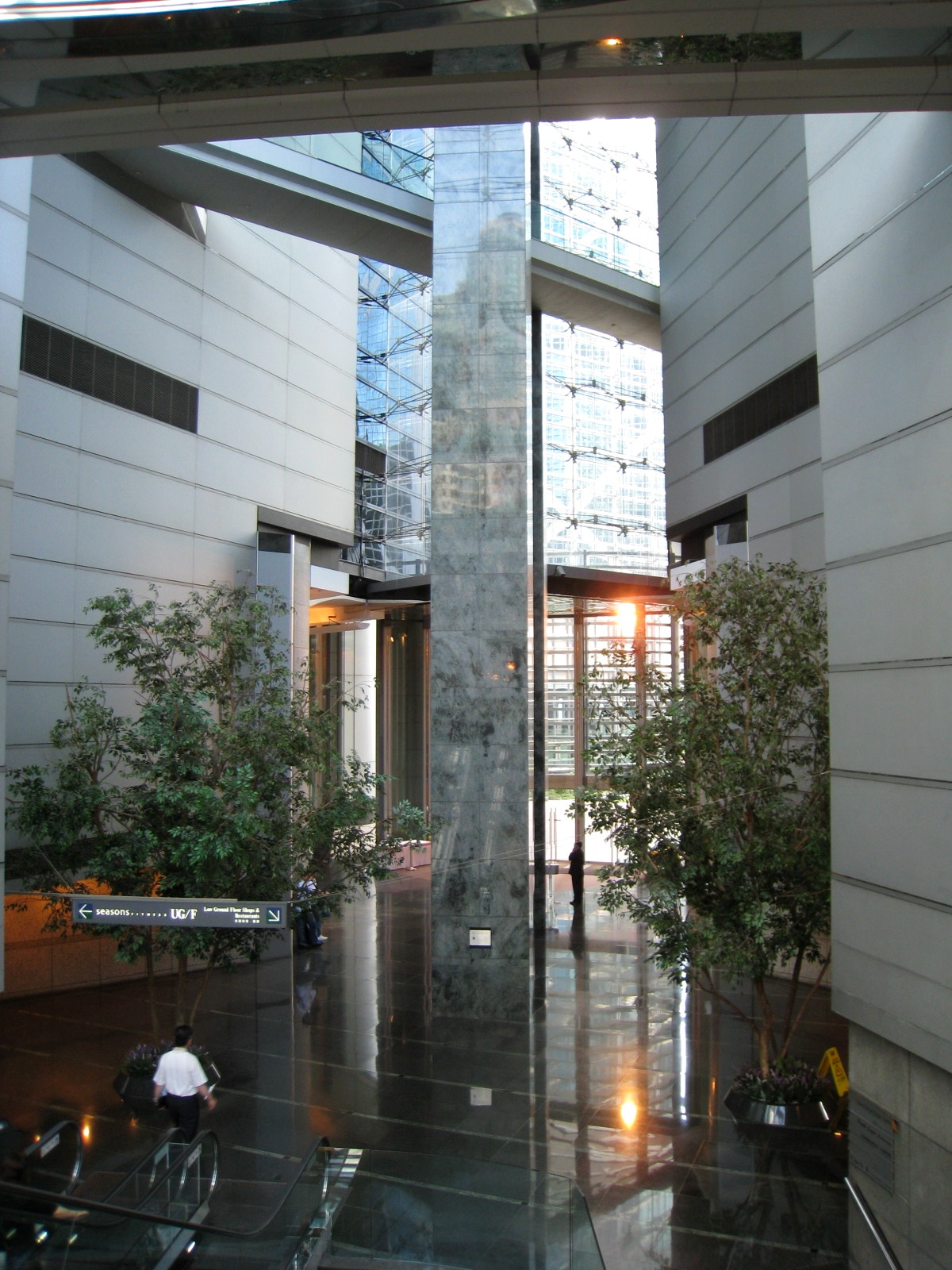
Lobby

Three Garden Road, Central, is an office building in Central, Hong Kong near Garden Road stop of the Peak Tram, completed in 1992 by the Great Eagle Group.

The building comprises two wings, each with its own service core, which are marketed as separate towers, namely: Champion Tower (formerly known as Citibank Tower), which has 47 storeys, and ICBC Tower, which has 37 storeys. There is also a retail podium.

== History ==
The site on Garden Road was previously part of Murray Barracks. The former Building and Lands Department of the Hong Kong Government put the site up for sale in July 1989. Five tenders were received. On 26 July 1989, the winning bid of HK$2.7 billion was formally announced to have come from Shine Hill Development, a subsidiary of Great Eagle Holdings. As the sale took place shortly after the Tiananmen Square massacre, this sum was considerably less than forecast. The atrocities in Beijing had severely damaged business confidence in Hong Kong's future, and property prices declined sharply. The Garden Road site, which had been expected to fetch $5 billion prior to the events in China, was reassessed at a benchmark figure of $3 billion just prior to tender.

Great Eagle led the development consortium and acted as both project and leasing manager. The development was designed by Hong Kong architect Rocco Yim. The main contractor and construction manager was Sung Foo Kee (now called SFK Construction).

The building was the first "intelligent" office building in Hong Kong with design specifications superior to other office buildings in Hong Kong at that time. It offered facilities such as raised flooring and smart entry gates and its main tenants were international financial institutions.

In 1994, the building won the Hong Kong Institute of Architects' highest award, the Silver Medal, in recognition for its outstanding architectural design.

In 2001, the Chinese name of the building changed from 萬國寶通廣場 to 花旗銀行廣場.

The building was spun off from Great Eagle and included in the newly formed Champion REIT in 2006. It was renamed "Three Garden Road, Central" on 28 June 2016. Citibank Tower was also renamed as Champion Tower whereas the name of ICBC Tower remained unchanged.

== Architectural details ==
Besides its two characteristic curved reflective facades, the complex contains many distinct architectural features, such as the flexibility to join 26 floors of both towers to provide an enlarged floor plate of up to 34,000 sq ft (3,200 m^{2}). Two ten-storey tall frameless glass panels provide the main lobby with natural lighting.

The property offers office space with a lettable floor area of more than 1.22 million square feet, approximately 42,500 square feet of retail space, as well as a three level basement car park capable of accommodating 558 vehicles.

With a gross floor area of almost 1,600,000 sq ft (150,000 m^{2}), Three Garden Road, Central is one of the biggest office complexes in Hong Kong. At 205 metres tall, Champion Tower reaches up to the 47th floor. The highest floor on ICBC Tower is the 37th.

== See also ==
- List of tallest buildings in Hong Kong
