= The Langham, Melbourne =

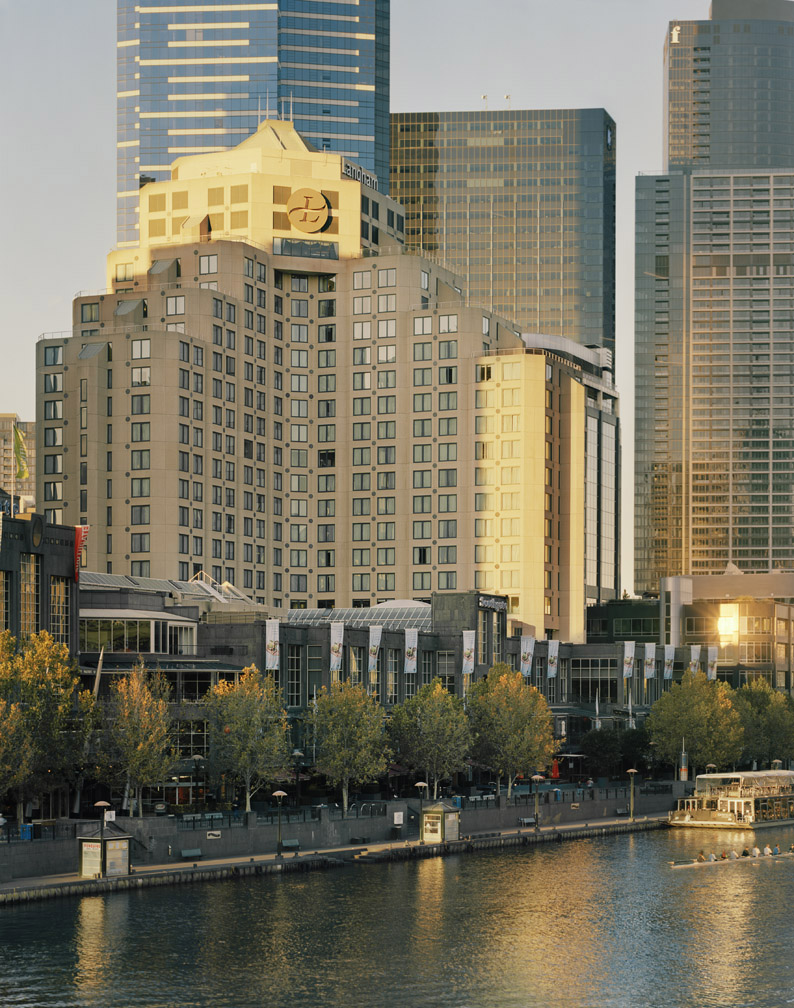
- A view of The Langham from across the Yarra river
- Interactive map of the The Langham, Melbourne area
- Alternative names: Sheraton Towers Southgate

General information
- Architectural style: Modernism
- Location: Yarra River, Melbourne, 1 Southgate Avenue, Melbourne, Australia
- Coordinates: 37°49′14″S 144°57′57″E
- Completed: 1992

Height
- Height: 88 meters

Technical details
- Floor count: 25

Design and construction
- Awards and prizes: 2021 Condé Nast Travelers #5 on top 10 hotels in Australia and New Zealand 2020 Traveler + Leisure #4 on top 5 City hotels in Australia and New Zealand.

Website
- www.langhamhotels.con

The Langham, Melbourne is a five star luxury hotel in Melbourne located on the Southbank Promenade.

== Background ==
The hotel was built in 1992 as the Sheraton Towers Southgate. It was re-branded as The Langham Hotel, Melbourne on 1 January 2005.

== The Hotel Today ==
The Langham, Melbourne is part of the Langham Hotels International chain which is owned by the Hong Kong real estate firm Great Eagle Holdings . The five star luxury hotel contains 388 guestrooms and suites most with views of the Melbourne skyline and Yarra river. Facilities inside the hotel range from a gym, spa, pool and the hotels Melba restaurant and two lounges.
