= The Setai =

The Setai may refer to:

- The Setai Fifth Avenue, a skyscraper in New York City
- The Setai Hotel and Residences, a luxury high-rise hotel in Miami Beach
