= Langham Hotel, London =

Hotel in Marylebone, London

The Langham, London
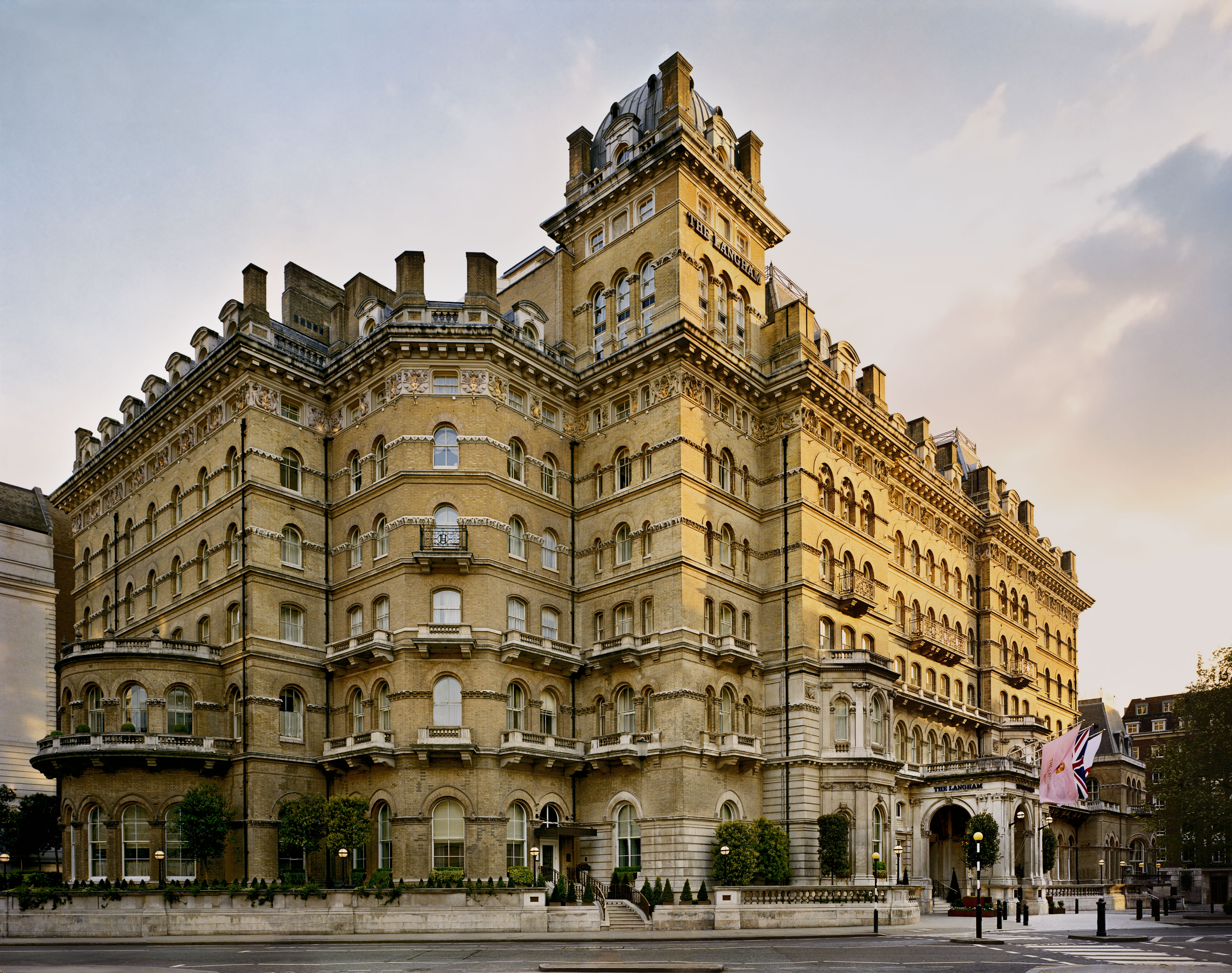

- Location within Central London

General information
- Location: 1c Portland Place, Regent Street, London, England
- Coordinates: 51°31′04″N 00°08′37″W
- Opened: 10 June 1865
- Owner: Great Eagle Holdings
- Operator: Langham Hospitality Group

Technical details
- Floor area: 8

Design and construction
- Designations: 5 stars

Other information
- Number of rooms: 380

Website
- langhamhotels.com/london

The Langham, London, is a 5-star hotel in London, England. It is situated in the district of Marylebone on Langham Place and faces up Portland Place towards Regent's Park.

== History ==
The Langham was designed by John Giles and built by Lucas Brothers between 1863 and 1865 at a cost of £300,000, equivalent to £32,589,442 in 2025. It was, at the time, the largest and most modern hotel in the city, featuring 100 water closets, 36 bathrooms and the first hydraulic lifts in England. The opening ceremony on 10 June 1865 was performed by the Prince of Wales. After the original company was liquidated during an economic slump, new management acquired the hotel for little more than half of its construction cost, and it soon became a commercial success.

In 1867 an American former Union Army officer, James Sanderson, was appointed general manager and the hotel developed an extensive American clientele, which included Mark Twain and the financier Hetty Green. It was also patronised by Napoleon III, Oscar Wilde, Dvorák, Toscanini, and Sibelius. Electric light was installed in the entrance and courtyard at the early date of 1879, and Arthur Conan Doyle set the Sherlock Holmes stories A Scandal in Bohemia and The Sign of Four partly at the Langham.

The Langham continued throughout the 20th century to be a favoured spot with members of the royal family, such as Diana, Princess of Wales, and politicians including Winston Churchill and Charles de Gaulle. Other guests included Noël Coward, Wallis Simpson, Don Bradman, Emperor Haile Selassie of Ethiopia and Ayumi Hamasaki.

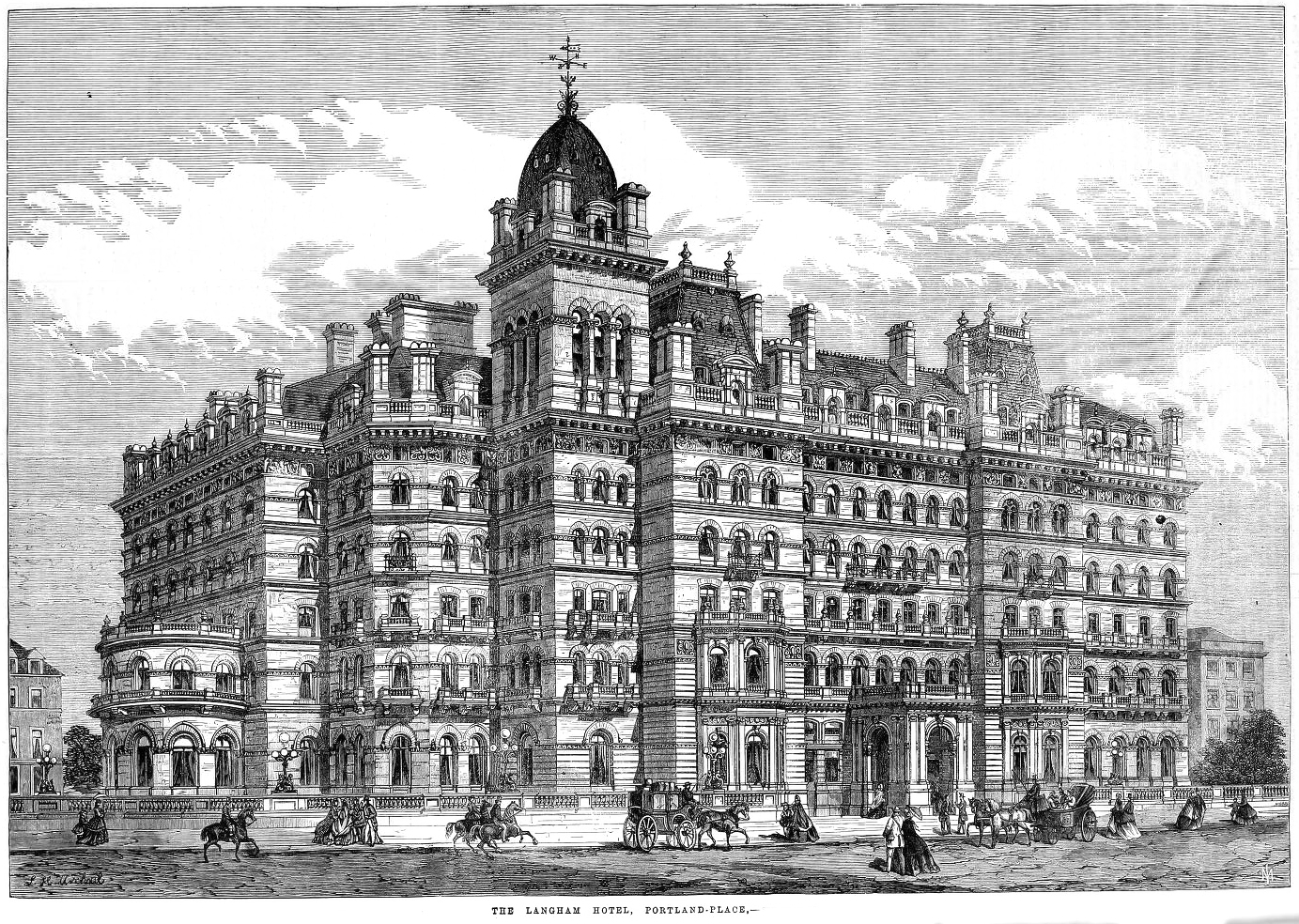
View of the hotel in 1865

The Langham was hard hit by the Great Depression and the owners attempted to sell the site to the BBC, but Broadcasting House was built across Portland Place instead. During World War II, the hotel was used in part by the British Army until it was damaged by bombs and forced to close. After the war, it was occupied by the BBC as ancillary accommodation to Broadcasting House, and the corporation purchased it outright in 1965.

One BBC employee who stayed at the Langham was Guy Burgess, one of the Cambridge Five, a spy ring that supplied official secrets to the Soviets during the Cold War. A BBC internal memo reveals that upon being unable to access his room in the hotel late one night, Burgess attempted to break down the door with a fire extinguisher.

The Palm Court became the reference library, and the restaurant a staff bar and refreshment room. In 1980, the BBC unsuccessfully applied for planning permission to demolish the building and replace it with an office development designed by Norman Foster. In 1986 the BBC sold the property to the Ladbroke Group (which later purchased the non-US Hilton hotels) for £26 million and eventually reopened the hotel as the Langham Hilton in 1991 after a £100 million refurbishment.

The Langham was sold to Hong Kong–based Great Eagle Holdings in 1995. The new owner extended the hotel and carried out other refurbishments between 1998 and 2000. Further renovation took place between 2004 and 2009, at an estimated cost of £80 million, restoring the hotel to its original form. Great Eagle subsequently rebadged a number of hotels in its portfolio using the "Langham" brand, creating a subsidiary, Langham Hotels International.

== The hotel today ==
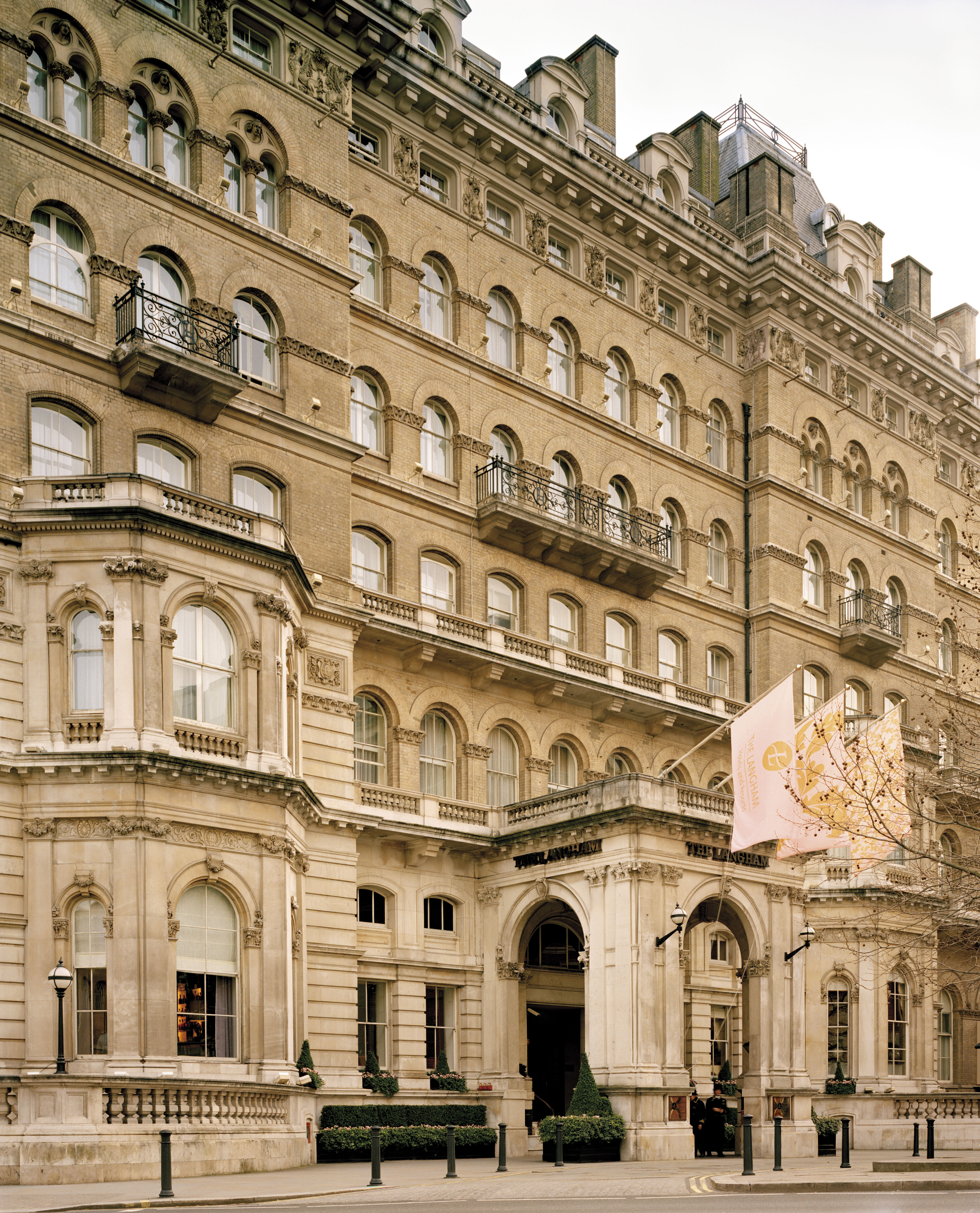
Exterior of the hotel

With a five star classification, the reconfigured Langham now has 380 rooms, a restored Palm Court which has served afternoon tea since 1865, a business centre and 15 function rooms including the Grand Ballroom.

Opened in 2024 was the new hotel restaurant, Mimosa (replacing The Landau), while next door to the hotel is the Wigmore, a British tavern from Michel Roux Jr. The hotel is hosting The Good Front Room, a popular long-term residency from Dom Taylor, which opened due to him winning the Five Star Kitchen TV show. There is also Artesian, their cocktail bar and a private dining room.

In 2019 the hotel opened a cookery school, Sauce by The Langham.

On 19 March 2010 Gyles Brandreth unveiled a City of Westminster green plaque commemorating the August 1889 meeting at the Langham between Oscar Wilde, Arthur Conan Doyle and Joseph Marshall Stoddart. Stoddart commissioned the two other men to write stories for his magazine Lippincott's Monthly Magazine. Arthur Conan Doyle wrote The Sign of Four which was published in the magazine in February 1890. Oscar Wilde wrote The Picture of Dorian Gray which was published in July 1890.

== In the media ==
The hotel featured in the James Bond film GoldenEye (1995), its entryway doubling in an exterior shot for Saint Petersburg's Grand Hotel Europe. Only the exterior was filmed at the hotel, while the interior was filmed in a studio.

The Langham featured in Michael Winterbottom's film Wonderland (1999), in external shots for Mary-Kate and Ashley Olsen's made-for-TV movie Winning London (2001), and in Garfield: A Tail of Two Kitties (2006).

The Langham's restaurant is the primary setting for the culinary drama film Burnt, starring Bradley Cooper.
