= Champion REIT =

Hong Kong real estate investment trust

Champion REIT 冠君產業信託
- Company type: public (SEHK: 2778)
- Industry: Property
- Founded: 2006-4-26
- Headquarters: Hong Kong
- Key people: Lo Ka-shui, Chairman
- Revenue: HKD 1613.8 million (2008)
- Operating income: HKD 1334.2 million (2008)
- Net income: HKD -2876.5 million (2008)
- Number of employees: none
- Website: www.championreit.com

Champion REIT is a Hong Kong real estate investment trust that owns office and commercial properties, primarily in Asia.

== Overview ==
Champion REIT was spun off from its sponsor Great Eagle Holdings, and listed on 24 May 2006 on the Hong Kong Stock Exchange. Its principal asset at the time was its stake in Citibank Plaza. Eagle Asset Management (CP) Limited, a subsidiary of the Great Eagle Holdings, is the REIT manager; HSBC Institutional Trust Services (Asia) Limited is the trustee. Following its acquisition of Langham Place, its portfolio has been increased in size to approximately 2,200,000 sq ft (200,000 m^{2}). of office space and 650,000 sq ft (60,000 m^{2}). of retail space in Hong Kong

== Citibank Plaza ==
Champion REIT owns 95.7% stake in Citibank Plaza, a modern glass and steel office complex that comprises Citibank Tower, a 47-storey building, and ICBC Tower, a 37-storey building, and includes a retail podium as well as a parking garage for 555 vehicles. The portion of Citibank Plaza controlled by Champion REIT has a total floor area of 1,559,278 square feet (144,862 m^{2}), comprising 1,501,557 square feet (139,499 m^{2}) of office space and 57,721 square feet (5,362 m^{2}) of retail space. Most of the stake was purchased by the REIT for HK$18.7 billion at the time of its initial public offering. An additional three floors within the complex were purchased by Champion REIT subsequently from Kerry Properties.

== Langham Place ==
On 3 June 2008, Champion REIT acquired from Great Eagle Holdings the non-hotel components of Langham Place in Mong Kok, Hong Kong, for HK$12.5 billion. The acquisition included 702,900 square feet (65,300 m²) of office space within the 59-storey Langham Place Office Tower and the entire Langham Place Mall which has 589,800 square feet (54,792 m²) of retail space and 250 parking spaces in the basement of the project. The Langham Place project was completed in July 2004. . The consideration valued the retail portion at HK$12,519 per square foot and about HK$6,815 for the office portion, an 11.8% discount to the appraised value.
