= Ai Fiori =

Restaurant in New York City, U.S.

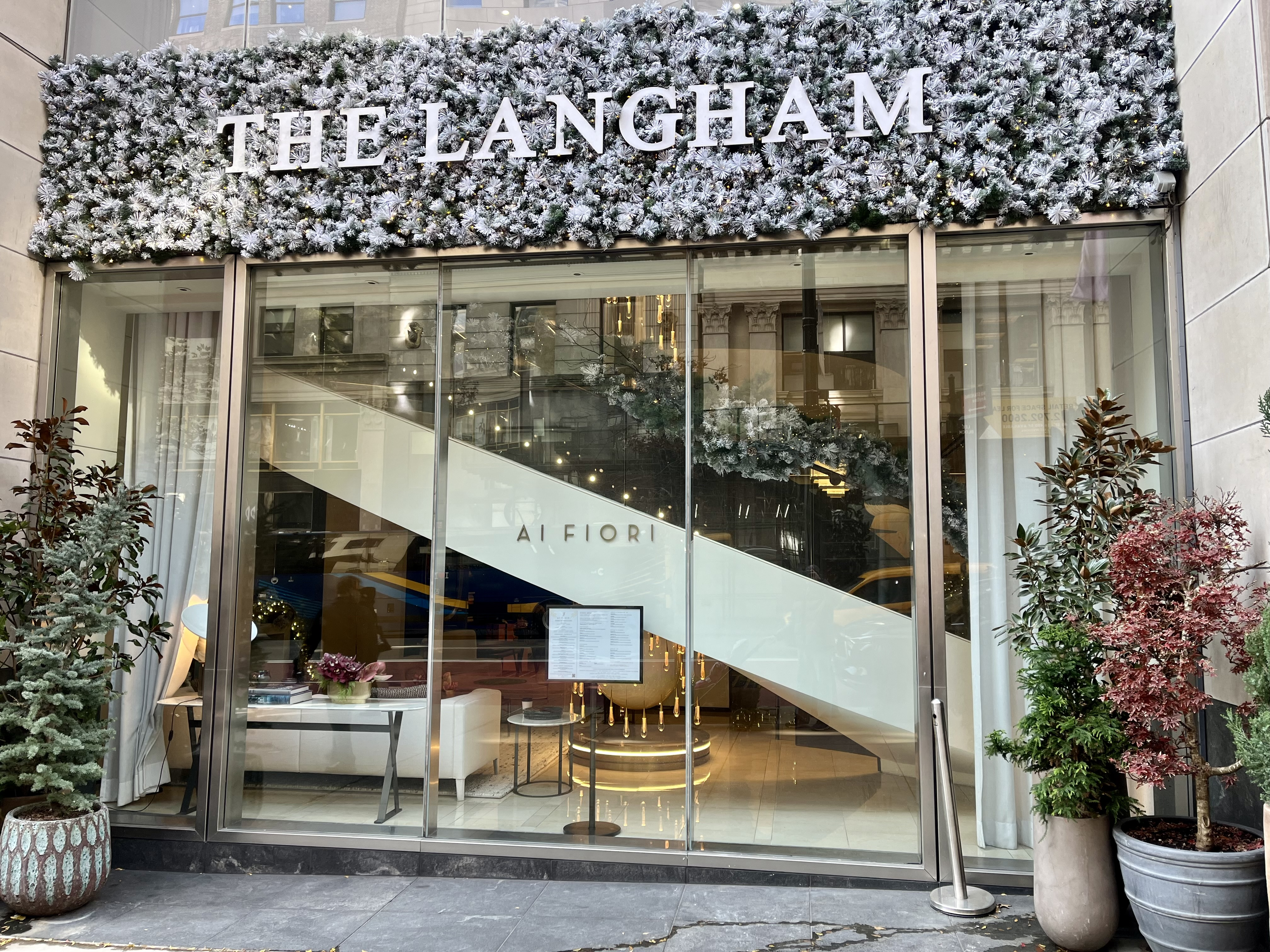
- Ai Fiori in November 2023
- Interactive map of Ai Fiori

Restaurant information
- Established: November 29, 2010
- Head chef: Yoshiyuki Nonaka
- Chef: Lauren DeSteno
- Pastry chef: Rachel Pancho
- Food type: French; Italian
- Location: 400 Fifth Avenue, 2nd Level, New York City, New York, 10018, United States
- Coordinates: 40°45′0″N 73°59′2″W
- Website: aifiorinyc.com

Ai Fiori is a restaurant in New York City. The restaurant is located in The Langham hotel in Midtown. It serves French and Italian cuisine.

Ai Fiori received a Michelin star (but lost it in 2022) and praise from The New York Times in its inaugural year. In May 2021, the restaurant publicized the opening of “The Sky Terrace” as a new rooftop lounge atop The Langham. The restaurant's wine list has also been ranked as one of the best in New York.

== See also ==
- List of Michelin-starred restaurants in New York City
