= The Langham, New York =

Skyscraper in Manhattan, New York

The Langham, New York, Fifth Avenue
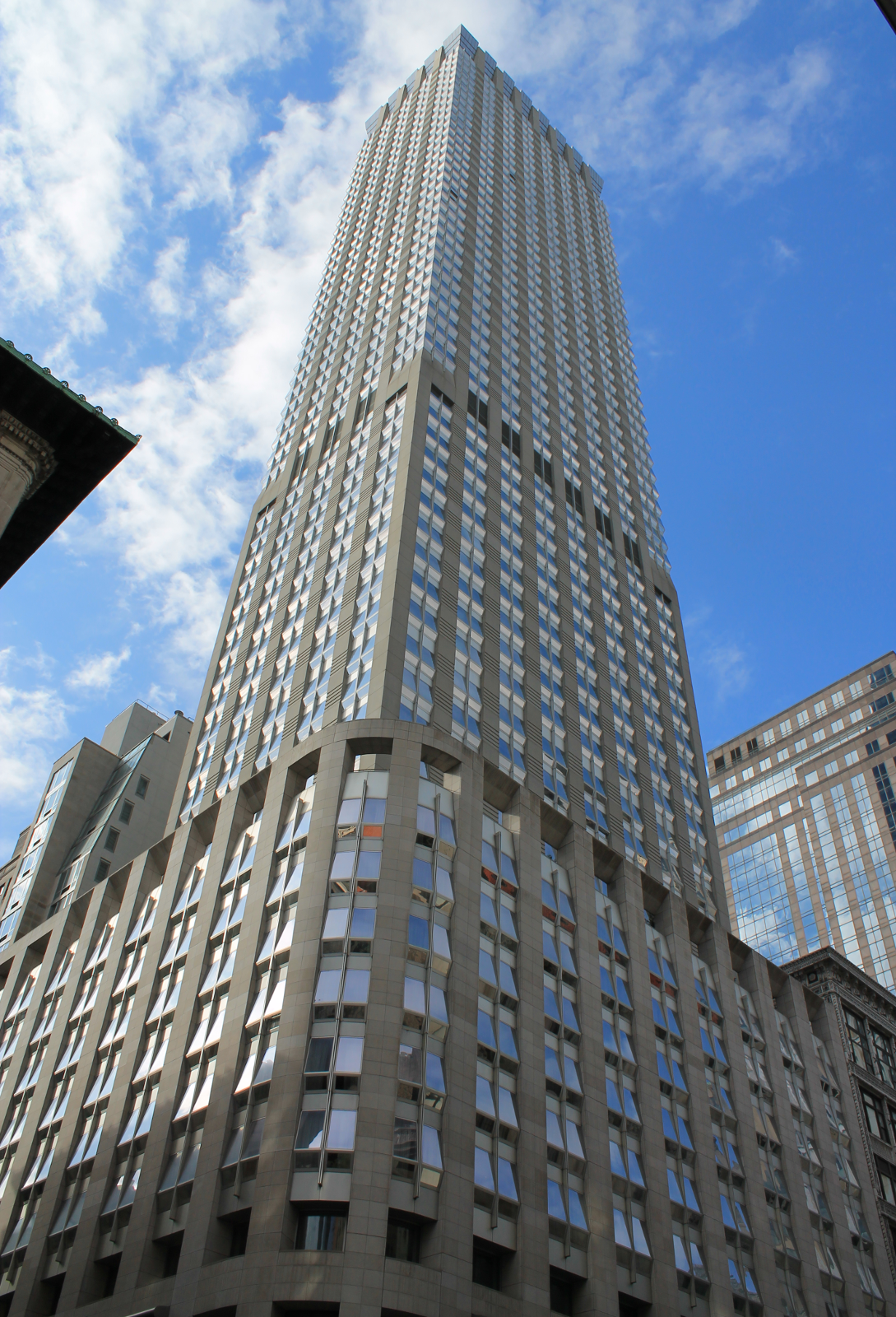

General information
- Status: Completed
- Type: Hotels, Residential
- Location: 400 5th Avenue; Manhattan, New York City, New York, United States
- Coordinates: 40°45′00″N 73°59′01″W
- Construction started: 2008
- Completed: 2010
- Opening: November 1, 2010
- Owner: Great Eagle Holdings

Height
- Roof: 632 feet (193 m)

Technical details
- Floor count: 57 (2 below ground)
- Floor area: 549,207 sq ft (51,023.0 m^{2})

Design and construction
- Architect: Gwathmey Siegel & Associates Architects
- Developer: Bizzi & Partners Development
- Structural engineer: DeSimone Consulting Engineers

The Langham, New York, Fifth Avenue is a luxury suite hotel located in a mixed-use skyscraper at 400 Fifth Avenue, between 36th and 37th Streets, in Midtown Manhattan, New York City. It is operated by the Langham Hospitality Group.

== History ==
The hotel was developed by Bizzi & Partners Development and opened in November 2010, as The Setai Fifth Avenue, managed by the Capella Hotel Group. In 2012, it was sold to Hong Kong–based Great Eagle Holdings for $229 million. Great Eagle placed the hotel under the management of their Langham Hospitality Group and it was renamed Langham Place, Fifth Avenue in May 2013. It was renamed The Langham, New York, Fifth Avenue in December 2017.

== Building ==
400 Fifth Avenue was constructed using limestone in the 11-floor base in a somewhat Art Deco style. Floors four through 16 contain 214 hotel rooms. The restaurant Ai Fiori is located in the building.
