= Great Eagle (car company) =

Defunct American motor vehicle manufacturer

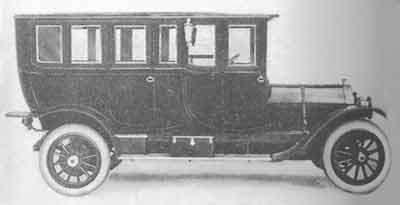
1912 Great Eagle 72hp 10 Passenger Undertaker's Limousine

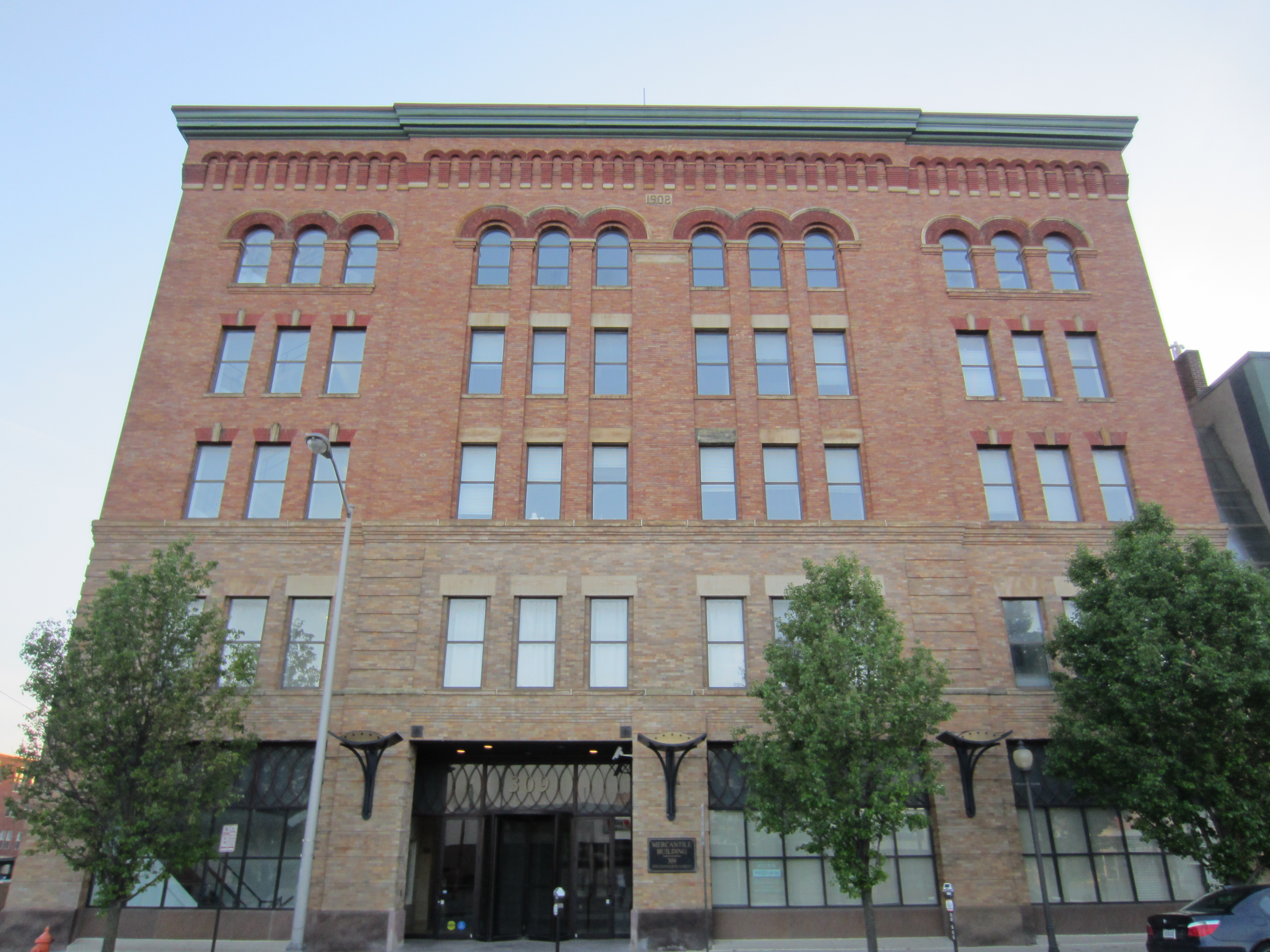
The building in Columbus where Great Eagle was headquartered

Great Eagle was an American automobile manufactured by the United States Carriage Company from 1910 to 1915, based in Columbus, Ohio. Fred C. Myers was the company president. The company went into receivership in 1915.

== Models ==
Year(model)	Engine	Horsepower	Type	Wheelbase
1910-1911(Four)	4-cylinder	40	Limo-7p; Landaulet-7p	126 in (3,200 mm)
1912(4-50)	4-cylinder	36		135 in (3,429 mm)
1912(6-60)	6-cylinder	41		138 in (3,505 mm)
1913(Model B)	4-cylinder	50		135 in (3,429 mm) (142 in (3,607 mm) Limo)
1913(Model C)	6-cylinder	60		142 in (3,607 mm) (147 in (3,734 mm) Limo)
1914-1915(4-50)	4-cylinder	50		138 in (3,505 mm)
1914-1915(6-60)	6-cylinder	60		142 in (3,607 mm)
