= Great Eagle Centre =

Office building in Hong Kong

Coordinates: 22.28096°N 114.17485°E

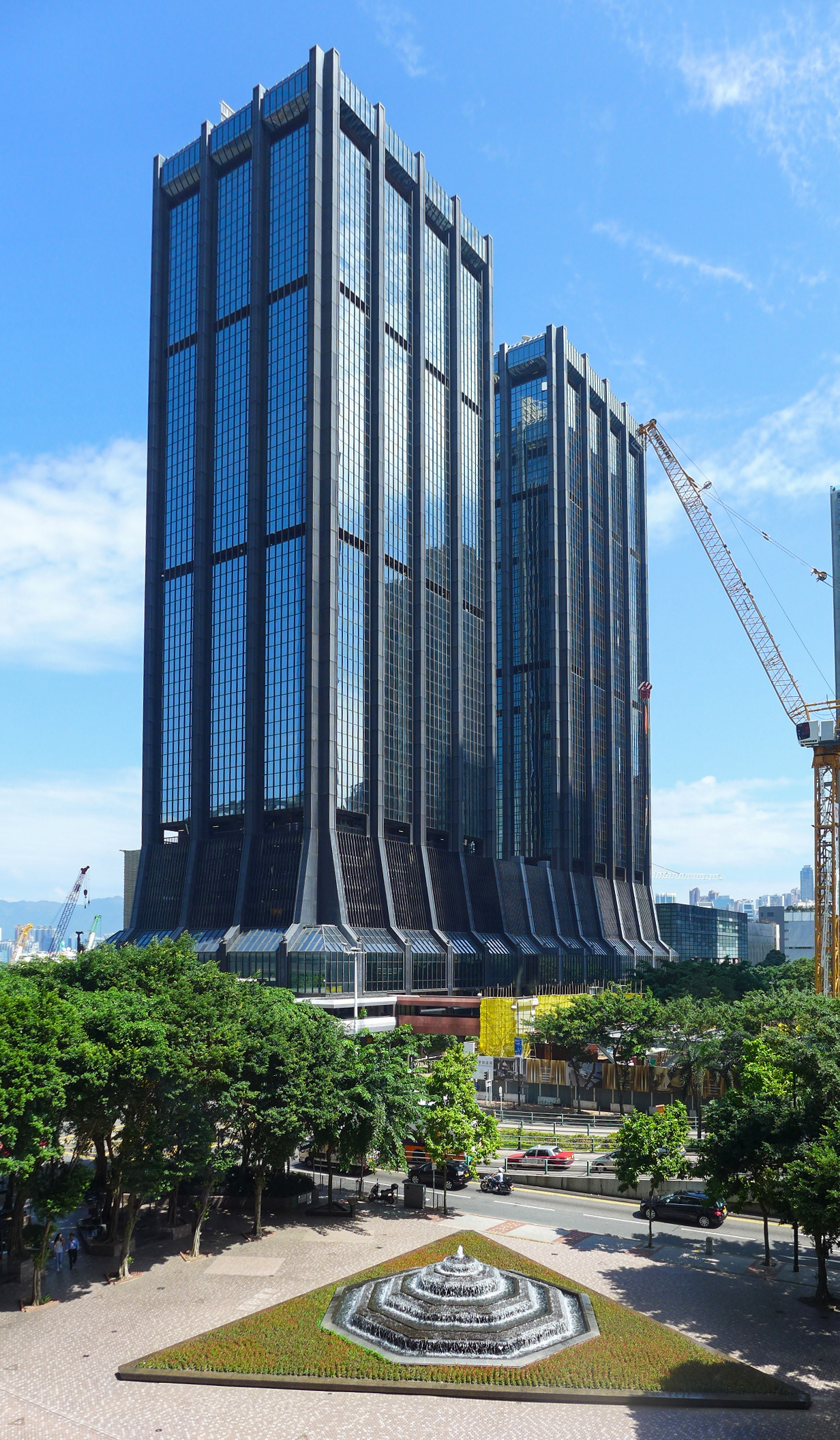
Great Eagle Centre (left) with Harbour Centre (right).

Great Eagle Centre (Chinese: 鷹君中心) is a 35-floor office building located at 23 Harbour Road in Wan Chai North, Hong Kong. It was built in 1983. Great Eagle Holdings has its headquarters in the 33rd floor.

== Tenants ==
- Boehringer Ingelheim
- Consulate General of the Czech Republic in Hong Kong

== Transportation ==
The building is directly connected to Exhibition Centre station and accessible within walking distance North from Wan Chai station on the MTR.

== See also ==
- Great Eagle Holdings
