= Langham Hospitality Group =

Hotel operator

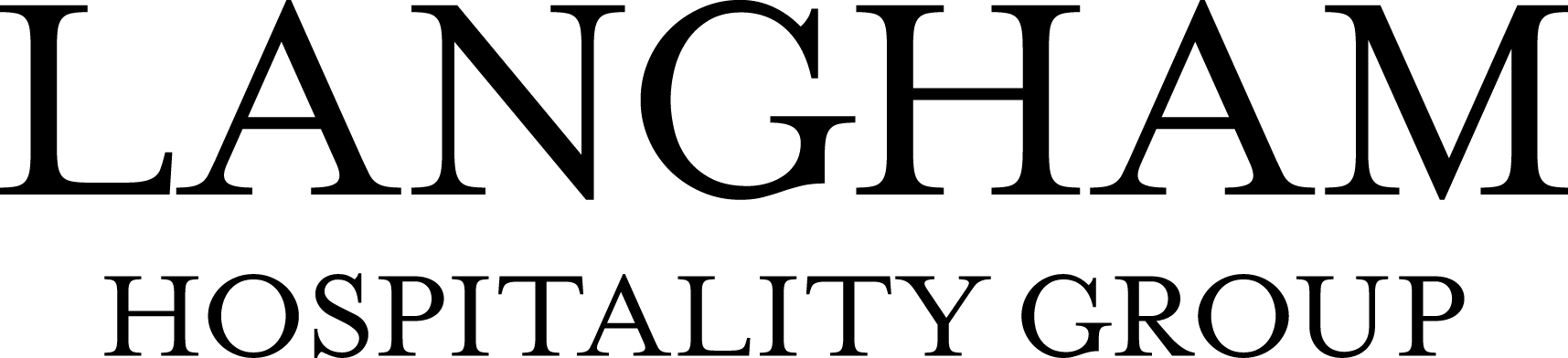
- Type: Subsidiary
- Industry: Hospitality
- Founded: August 30, 1984; 42 years ago
- Headquarters: Wan Chai, Hong Kong; London, United Kingdom
- Parent: Great Eagle Holdings
- Website: langhamhospitalitygroup.com

Langham Hotels International Limited, trading as Langham Hospitality Group, is a hotel operator with its headquarters in Hong Kong. Langham Hotels International Limited is wholly owned by Great Eagle Holdings, which was founded in 1963 and is listed on the Hong Kong Stock Exchange.

== History ==
Langham Hospitality Group claims a history that dates back to 1865, when The Langham hotel in London opened as the then-largest building in London and Europe's first 'Grand Hotel'. Ten storeys and 156 feet (48 m) high, The Langham featured 15,000 yards (14,000 m) of Persian tapestry, hot and cold running water in every guestroom, the world's first hydraulic lifts, known as 'rising rooms', and even an early form of air-conditioning. Upon opening, The Langham, the then Prince of Wales hailed the hotel as having "everything a man, woman or child could desire under one roof".

The hotel closed during World War II. After the war, it was bought by the BBC and used as office space until 1986, when it was sold to the Ladbroke Group, which also purchased the non-US Hilton hotels, and was re-opened in 1991as the Langham Hilton hotel.

The Langham was sold to Great Eagle Holdings in 1995. Great Eagle used the "Langham" brand to re-badge a number of hotels in its portfolio, thus creating the Langham Hospitality Group. Great Eagle has subsequently purchased further hotels and re-badged them as "Langham" hotels. It has also moved other hotel brands within its portfolio into the Langham Hospitality Group.

=== Senior leadership ===
From the Group's founding in 1984, there was no dedicated CEO until 2009. Instead, the Group was managed directly by executives of the parent company, Great Eagle Holdings. In 2009, the Group began to appoint a standalone CEO.

==== List of CEOs ====
1. Brett Butcher (2009–2014)
2. Robert Warman (2014–2018)
3. Stefan Leser (2018–2021)
4. Brett Butcher (2021–2023; second term)
5. Bob Van Den Oord (since September 2023)

== Ownership ==
Langham Hospitality Group is a wholly owned subsidiary (as Langham Hotels International Limited) of Great Eagle Holdings. It not only oversees the operations and performance of its own hotels, but also provides professional management services to its developer- or owner-partners. Great Eagle Holdings invests in, develops and manages office, retail, residential and hotel properties in Asia, North America and Europe. The organisation is also active in property management and maintenance services, as well as building materials trading. Great Eagle Holdings was founded in 1963 with the incorporation of The Great Eagle Company Limited, which was listed on the Hong Kong Stock Exchange in 1972. In 1990, following a reorganisation, Great Eagle Holdings Limited, incorporated in Bermuda, became the listed holding company of Great Eagle in place of The Great Eagle Company Limited.

== Properties ==
=== Hotels ===
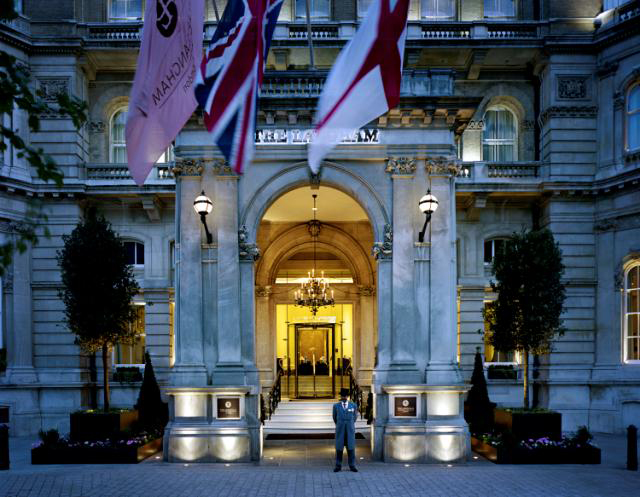
The Langham, London, 2010

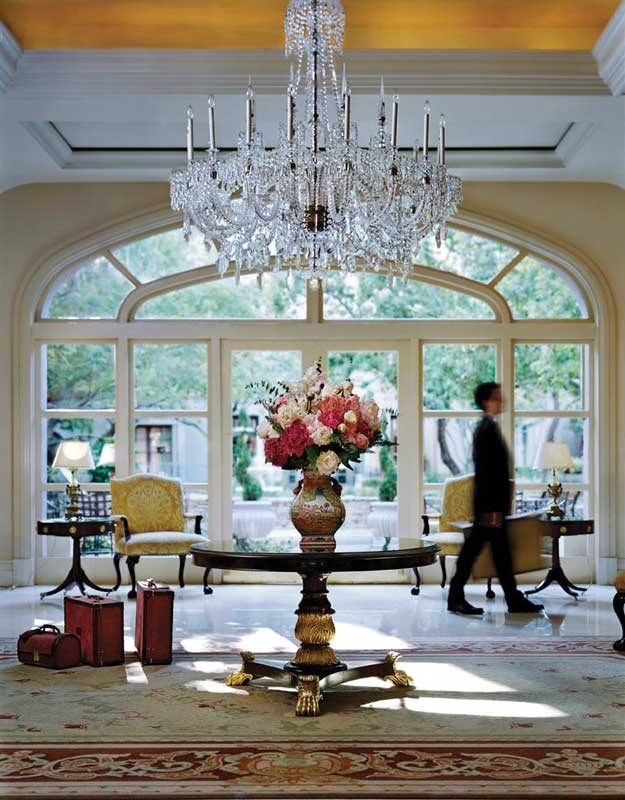
Lobby of The Langham Huntington, Pasadena, 2005

The group covers four continents, with projects in cities and resorts under its two brands, The Langham Hotels and Resorts and Cordis Hotels and Resorts, as well as its affiliate hotels. The group also owns the 1,590-room Chelsea Hotel in Toronto.

List of Langham Hotels with Room Count
No.	Brand	Property	Room Count	Country/Territory	Year opened
1	The Langham	London	333	United Kingdom	1865
2	The Langham	Hong Kong	471	Hong Kong	1989
3	The Langham	Boston	312	United States	2003
4	The Langham	Melbourne	363	Australia	2005
5	The Langham	Huntington, Pasadena	379	United States	2008
6	The Langham	Shanghai	357	China	2010
7	The Langham	Shenzhen	352	China	2012
8	The Langham	Chicago	268	United States	2013
9	The Langham	New York, 5th Avenue	234	United States	2013
10	Langham Place	Guangzhou	434	China	2013
11	Langham Place	Ningbo Culture Plaza	143	China	2014
12	Langham Place	Xiamen	285	China	2014
13	The Langham	Sydney	75	Australia	2014
14	The Langham	Hefei	300	China	2015
15	The Langham	Haikou	249	China	2016
16	Langham Place	Changsha	295	China	2021
17	The Langham (Note: It is owned by Agung Sedayu Group under the license agreement with Great Eagle Holdings.)	Jakarta	224	Indonesia	2021
18	The Langham	Gold Coast	339	Australia	2022

List of upcoming Langham Hotels
Brand	Property	Country/Territory	Expected opening year
The Langham	Bangkok	Thailand	2026
The Langham	Chengdu	China	
The Langham	Diriyah	Saudi Arabia	2029
The Langham	Foshan	China	
The Langham	Kuala Lumpur	Malaysia	2027
The Langham	Nanjing	China	
The Langham	San Francisco	United States	
The Langham	Seattle	United States	
The Langham	Tokyo	Japan	
The Langham	Venice	Italy	2027
The Langham	Xiamen, Seaworld	China	

=== Restaurants ===
The hotel chain operates Michelin-starred Chinese restaurants, including the three-star T'ang Court in The Langham, Hong Kong, and also the one-star Ming Court in Cordis Hong Kong. Both sets of ratings were awarded in the 2013 Hong Kong and Macau edition of the Michelin Guide.
