= Great Eagle Holdings =

Hong Kong real estate company

Great Eagle Holdings Limited
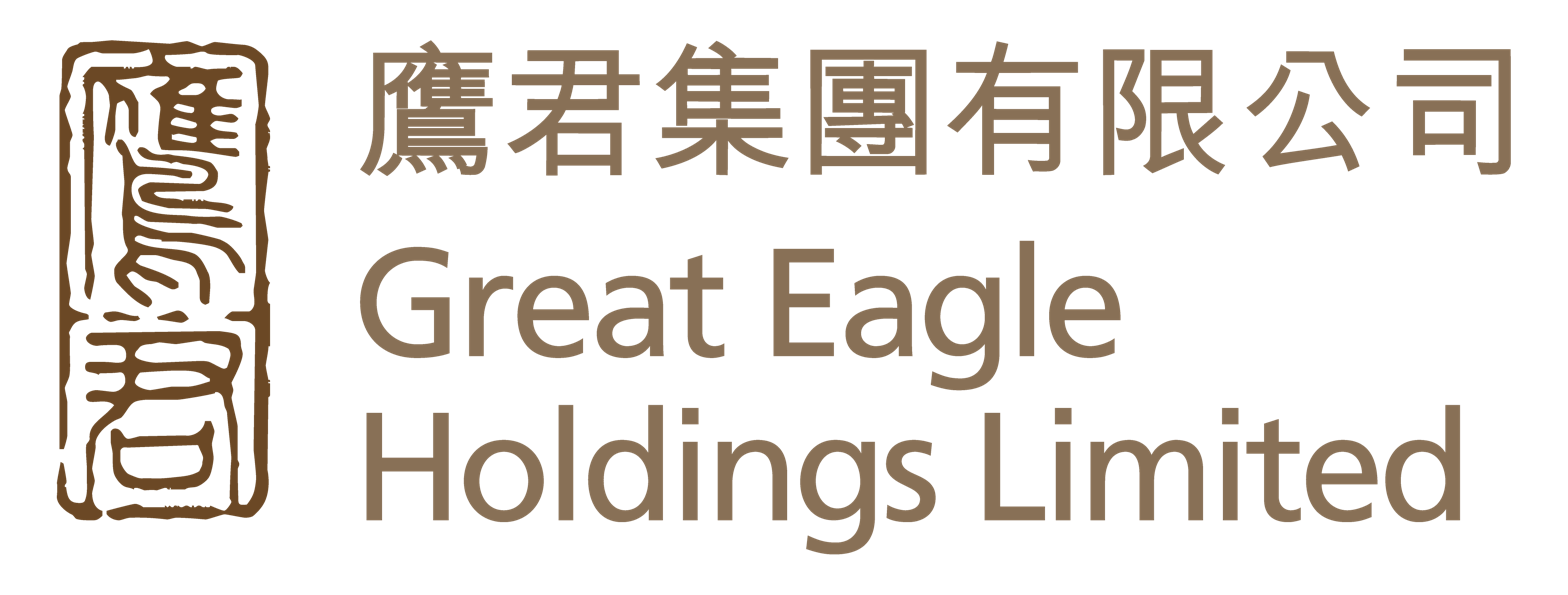

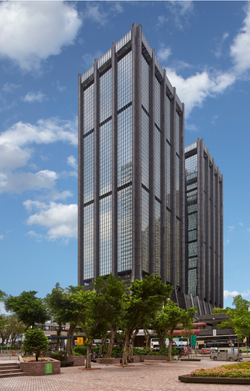
- Great Eagle Centre
- Type: Public
- Traded as: SEHK: 41
- Industry: Hotels and real estate
- Founded: 1963 in Hong Kong
- Founder: Lo Ying-shek and Lo To Lee Kwan
- Headquarters: Great Eagle Centre, Hong Kong
- Area served: Worldwide
- Key people: Lo Ka-shui (Chairman and Managing Director)
- Revenue: HK$7,833 million (2024)
- Operating income: HK$2,886 million (2024)
- Total assets: HK$99,404 million (2024)
- Number of employees: 6,219 (2024)
- Website: greateagle.com.hk

Great Eagle Holdings Limited (SEHK: 41) is a Hong Kong real estate company listed on the Hong Kong Stock Exchange. Through its subsidiaries, the company engages in property investment and owns and operates various hotels. Its head office is located at the Great Eagle Centre, Harbour Road, Wanchai, Hong Kong.

The company operates in Hong Kong, North America, Europe and the Asia Pacific region. As at 31 December 2024, the Group's extensive international hotel portfolio comprises thirty-one properties with more than 11,000 rooms, including twenty-six luxury hotels branded under The Langham and Cordis brands in Hong Kong, London, New York, Chicago, Boston, Los Angeles, Sydney, Melbourne, Gold Coast, Auckland, Jakarta, Shanghai, Beijing, Shenzhen, Guangzhou, Foshan, Haikou, Ningbo, Xiamen, Hefei, Changsha, Xuzhou and Baoshan; two Eaton hotels in Washington D.C. and Hong Kong; two Ying'nFlo in Hong Kong and the Chelsea hotel in Toronto.

== History and developments ==
The Great Eagle Group was founded by Lo Ying Shek in 1963 with The Great Eagle Company, Limited as its holding company, shares of which were listed on the Hong Kong Stock Exchange in 1972. The Group underwent a reorganization in 1990 and Great Eagle Holdings Limited (Stock Code: 0041), a Bermuda registered company, became the listed holding company of the Group in place of The Great Eagle Company, Limited.

== Principal holdings ==
The Group has a principal holding in Champion Real Estate Investment Trust (Champion REIT, HKSE: 02778) and Langham Hospitality Investments Limited (LHI, HKSE: 01270).

Champion REIT owns Three Garden Road, a Grade-A office building in Central, Hong Kong; the office tower and shopping mall of Langham Place in Mongkok, Kowloon, as well as joint venture stake in 66 Shoe Lane in Central London.

The LHI (HKSE: 01270) owns three hotels in Kowloon, including The Langham in Tsimshatsui, Cordis in Mongkok, and Eaton on Nathan Road.
