= Jaffe Road =

Road in Wan Chai, Hong Kong

Coordinates: 22.27873°N 114.17355°E

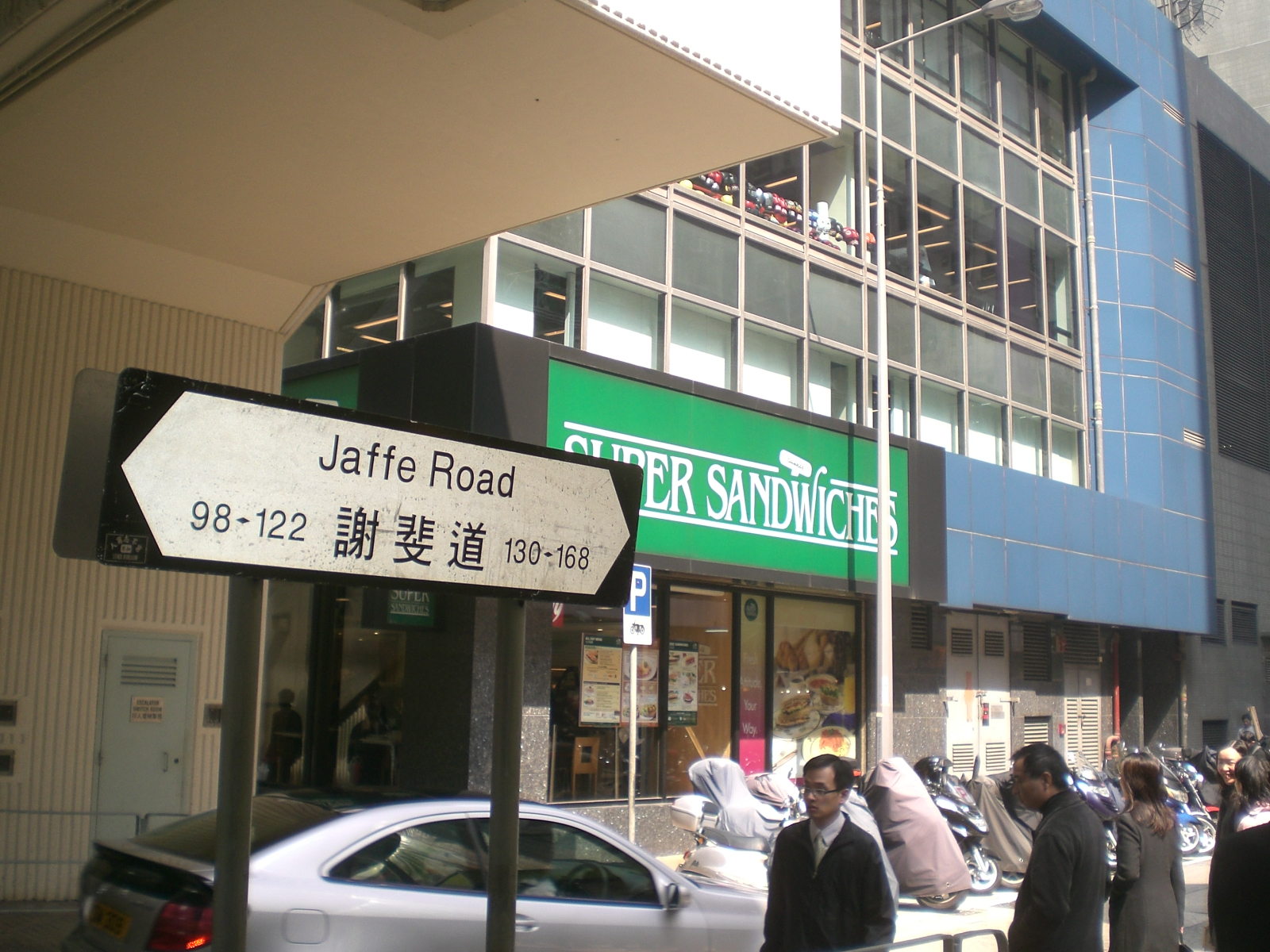
- Jaffe Road
- Interactive map of Jaffe Road
- Native name: 謝斐道 (Chinese)
- Location: Hong Kong

Jaffe Road (Chinese: 謝斐道) is a road in Wan Chai and Causeway Bay, Hong Kong. It starts from Arsenal Street near Admiralty and ends at The Excelsior Hotel near World Trade Centre. It runs generally parallel to Gloucester and Lockhart roads.

== Namesake ==
Jaffe Road was named after Daniel Joseph Jaffé in 1931, once the executive engineer of the former Public Works Department.

== Buildings along the road ==
- Mass Mutual Tower
- Harcourt House
- Novotel Century Hong Kong
- Elizabeth House

== See also ==
- List of streets and roads in Hong Kong
