= Novotel Century Hong Kong =

Hotel in Wan Chai, Hong Kong

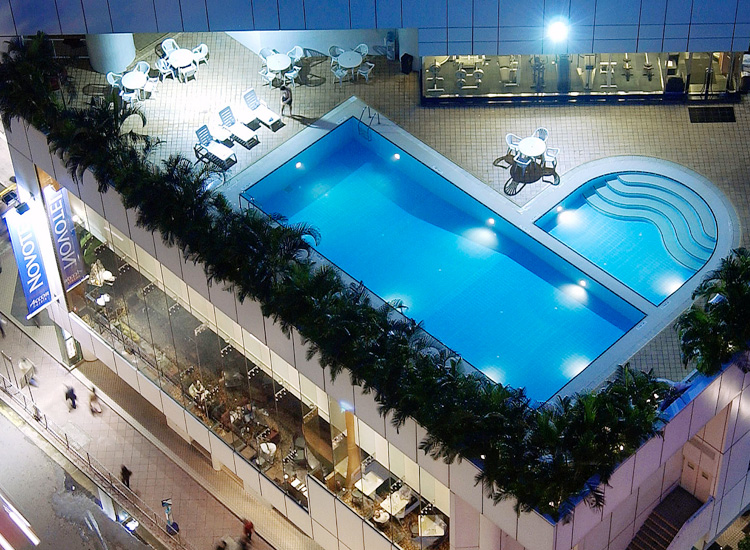

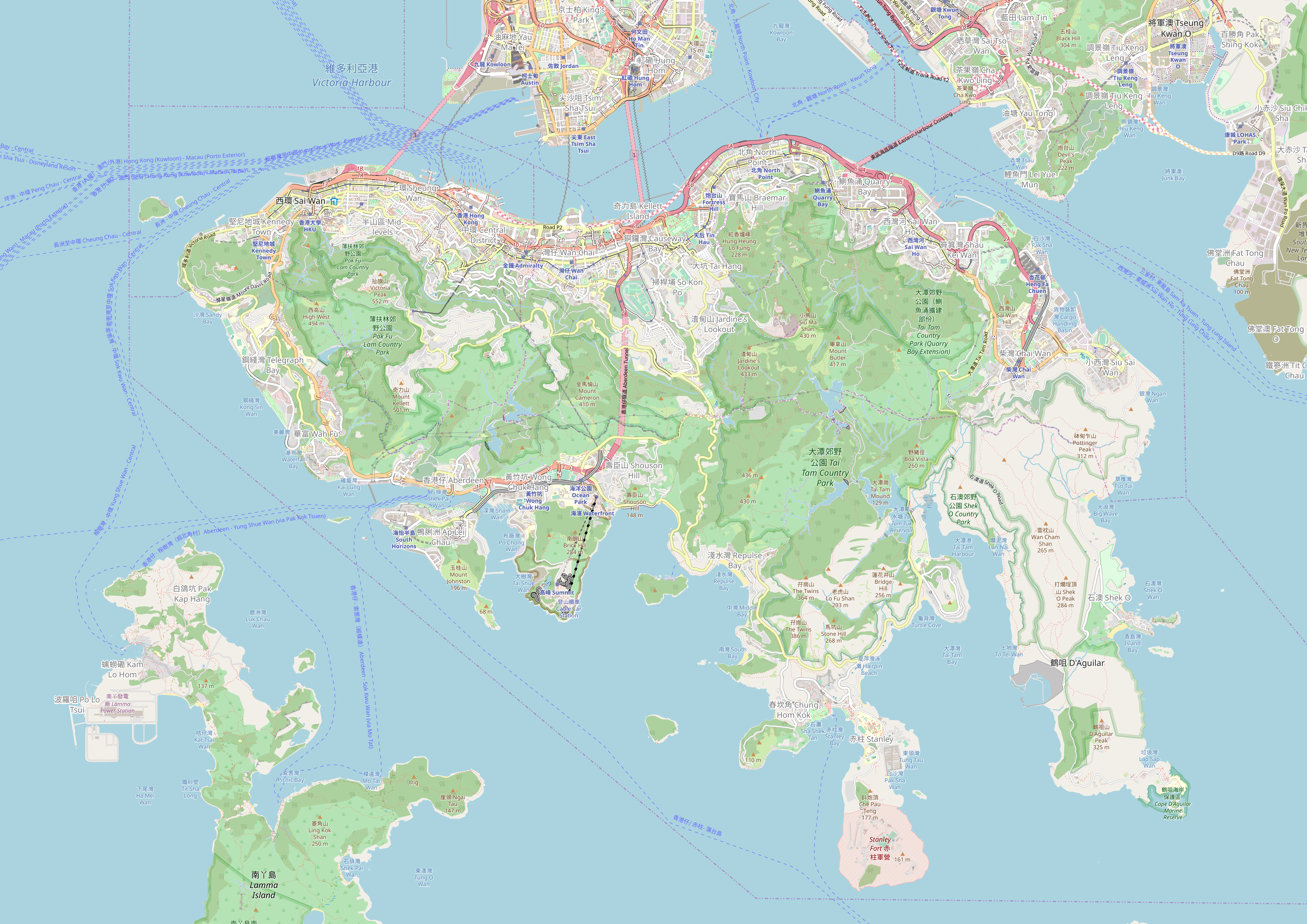
- Location on Hong Kong Island

General information
- Location: 238 Jaffe Road, Wan Chai, Hong Kong
- Coordinates: 22°16′44.43″N 114°10′36.13″E
- Opening: 1991; 35 years ago

Technical details
- Floor count: 23

Other information
- Number of rooms: 509
- Number of restaurants: 3

Website
- https://www.novotelhongkongcentury.com/

Novotel Century Hong Kong
- Traditional Chinese: 香港諾富特世紀酒店
- Simplified Chinese: 世纪香港酒店
- Literal meaning: Century Hong Kong Hotel
Transcriptions
Standard Mandarin
- Hanyu Pinyin: Shìjì Xiānggǎng Jiǔdiàn
Yue: Cantonese
- Jyutping: sai3 gei2 hoeng1 gong2 zau2 dim3

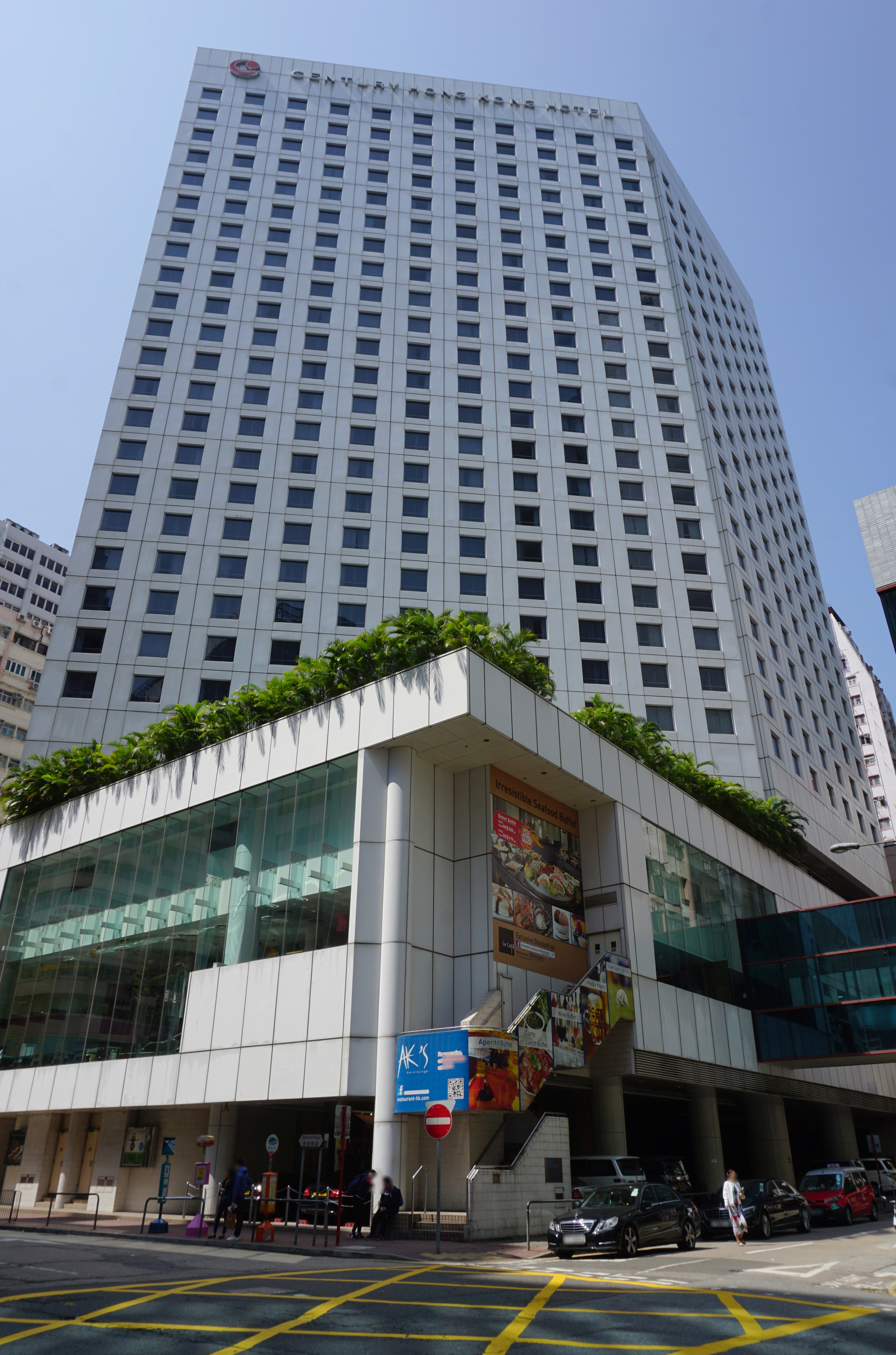
Novotel Century Hong Kong viewed from the corner of Stewart Road and Jaffe Road

Novotel Century Hong Kong (Chinese: 世紀香港酒店) is a 4-star hotel in Hong Kong. It is located at 238 Jaffe Road, at the junction of Jaffe Road and Stewart Road in Wan Chai.

== History ==
The hotel opened in 1991 and was formerly known as the Century Hong Kong Hotel.

On 1 November 2001, in conjunction with the 10th Anniversary of Century Hong Kong Hotel, the Hotel was co-branded to Novotel Century Hong Kong. The new co-branded name signifies the introduction of Accor's hotel brand Novotel in Hong Kong, following the partnership announcement early in 2001 between Century International Hotels and Accor.

== Facilities ==
The hotel has 509 rooms, 2 restaurants, a bar, meeting and conference facilities, a gym and an outdoor swimming pool as well as a sauna.

== Restaurants and bar ==
- Le Cafe
- Pepino Italian Restaurant
- AK's bar + lounge
