= World Trade Centre Hong Kong =

Building in Causeway Bay, Hong Kong, built 1975

Coordinates: 22°16′54″N 114°11′03″E

- Traditional Chinese: 世貿中心
- Simplified Chinese: 世贸中心
Transcriptions
Standard Mandarin
- Hanyu Pinyin: Shìmào Zhōngxīn
Yue: Cantonese
- Jyutping: Sai3 mau6 zung1 sam1

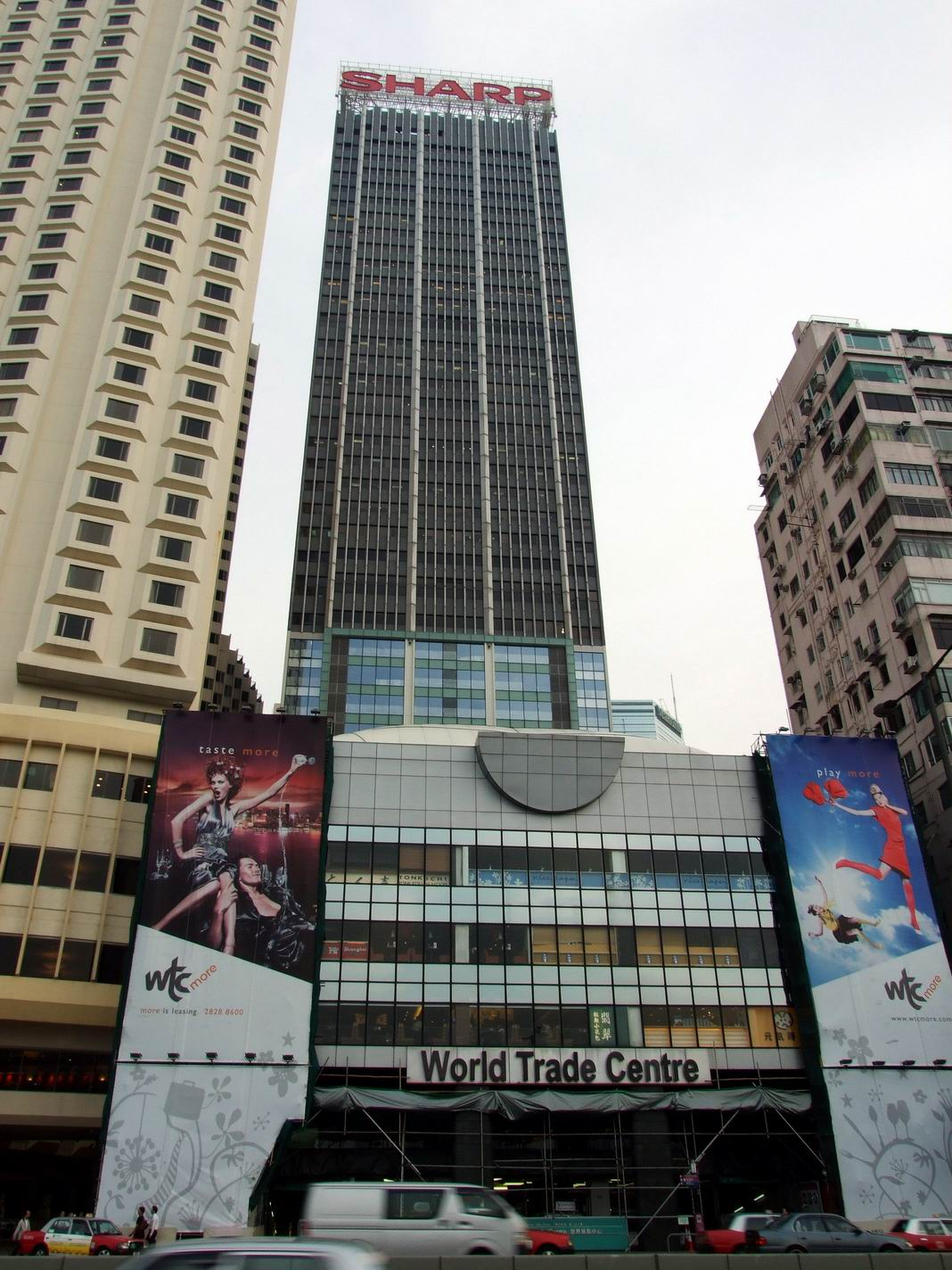
World Trade Centre in November 2007, viewed from Gloucester Road. The building on the left is The Excelsior.

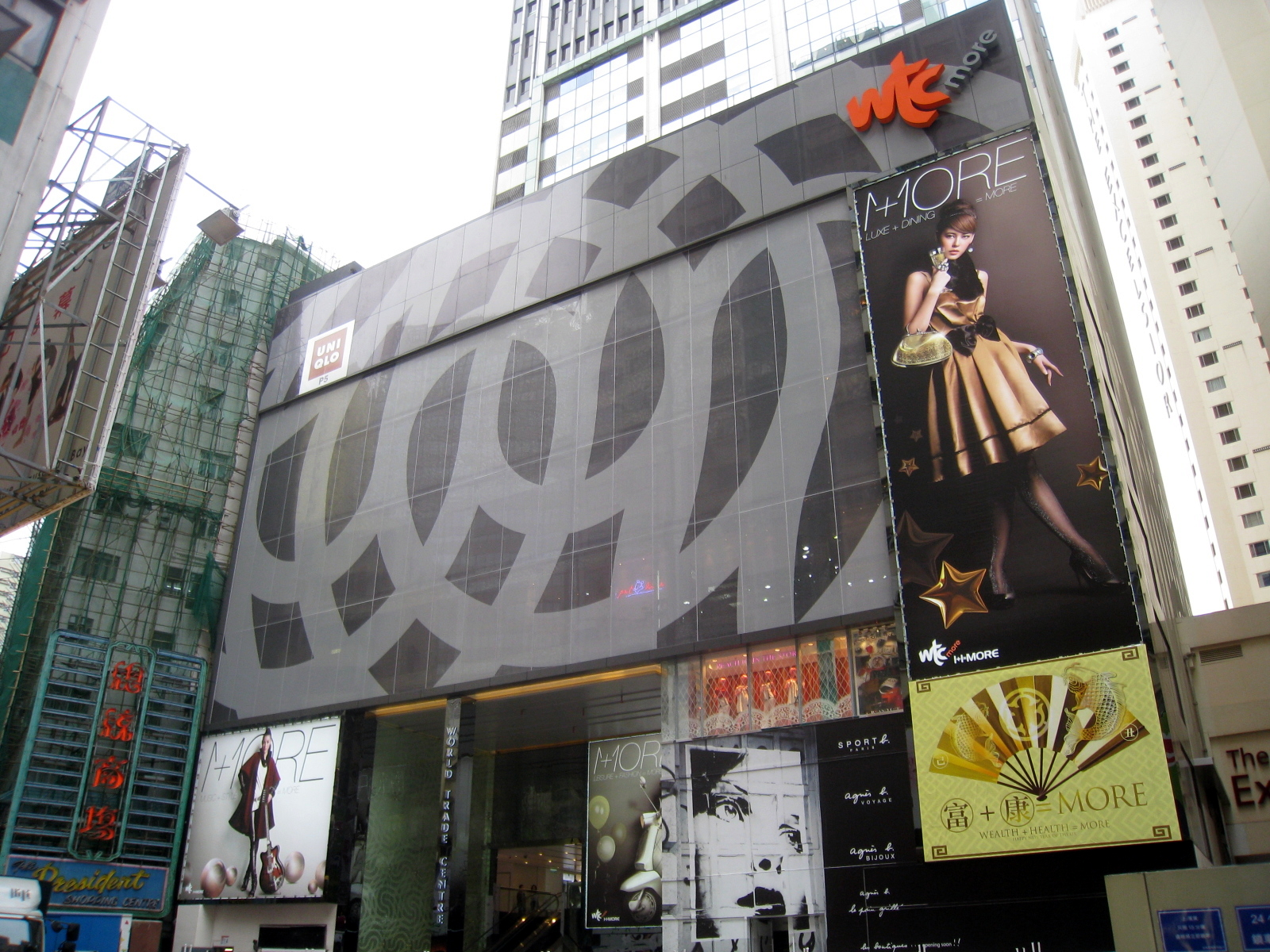
World Trade Centre after renovation, viewed from Jaffe Road in February 2009.

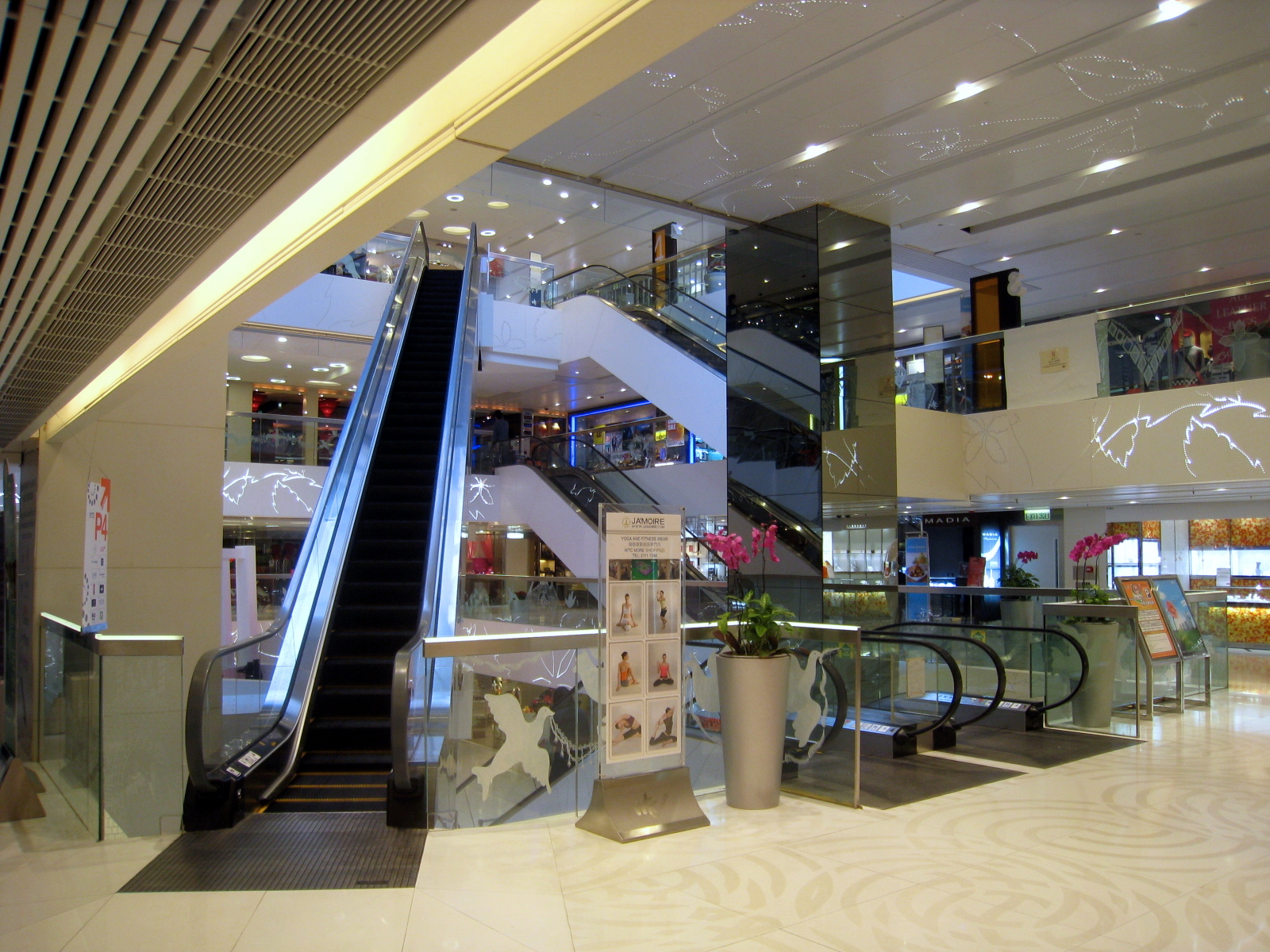
World Trade Centre Shopping arcade after renovation in February 2009.

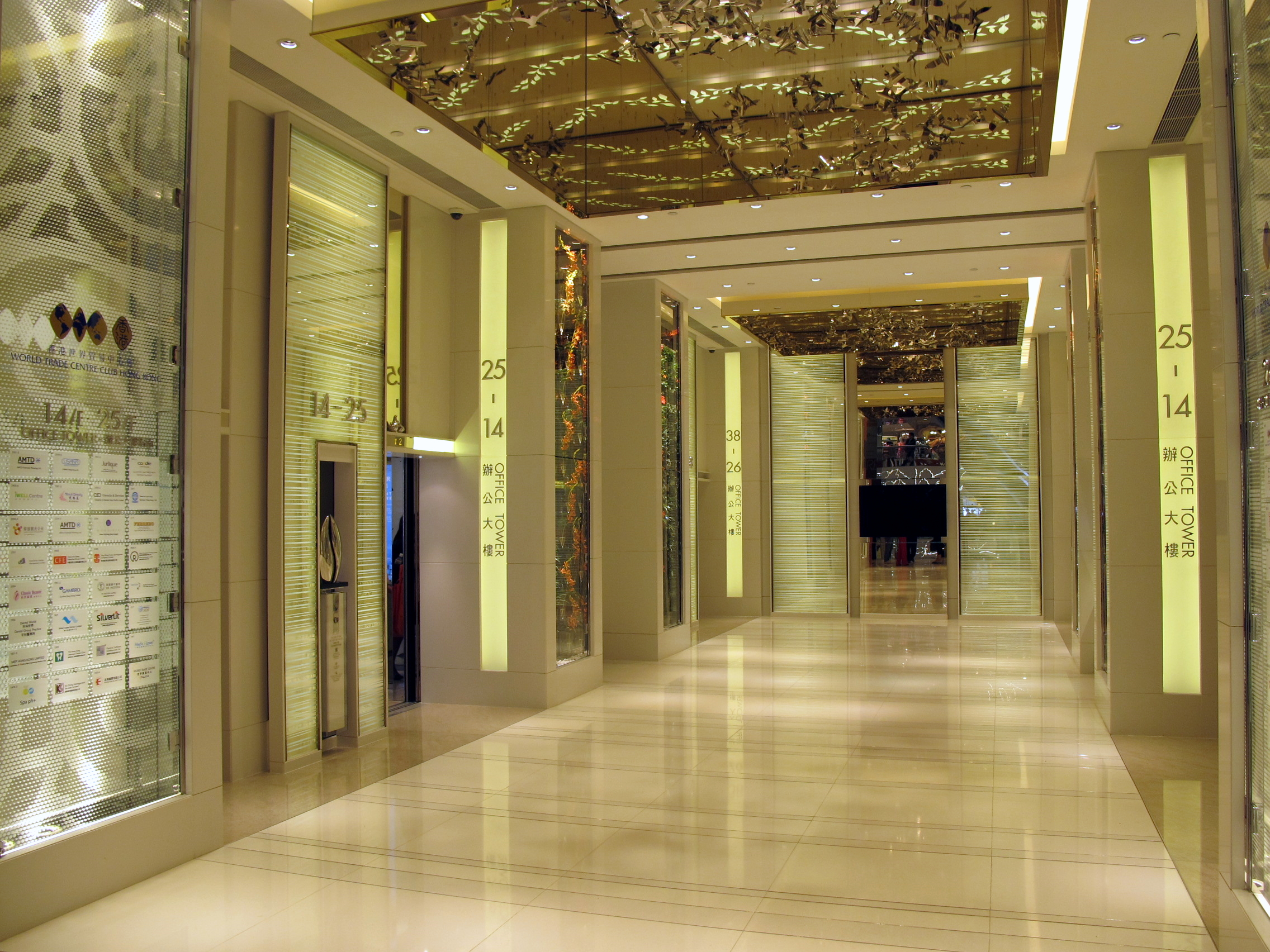
World Trade Centre office lobby after renovation in April 2011.

The World Trade Centre is a shopping centre and office tower complex in Causeway Bay, Hong Kong. It was connected via passageway to its neighbour, The Excelsior, until the demolition of The Excelsior on 31 March 2019.

The complex was developed by Jardines through its property development arm, Hongkong Land. It was later sold to Sun Hung Kai Properties. It is situated on land owned by Jardine since the early days of Hong Kong as a British Crown Colony at East Point, where Jardine had their original godowns and offices.

== History ==
Located at No. 280 Gloucester Road, World Trade Centre was built in 1975. Although it originally housed the nightclub Palace Theatre (Chinese: 碧麗宮), it was later remodeled to be Hong Kong's most luxurious cinema of the same name. The food and beverage corporation Maxim's also established a restaurant branch in the building, and garnered relative fame at the time.

In 1990, World Trade Centre Group Ltd (formerly Bond Corporation International Ltd) purchased the building from Hongkong Land for HK$1.72 billion. In 1994, the World Trade Centre was later sold to Sun Hung Kai Properties and was remodelled again to its present form, with the lower floors as a mall and the upper floors remaining as office space.

On 15 December 2021, a fire broke out in the World Trade Centre causing more than 300 people to be trapped on the building's roof.

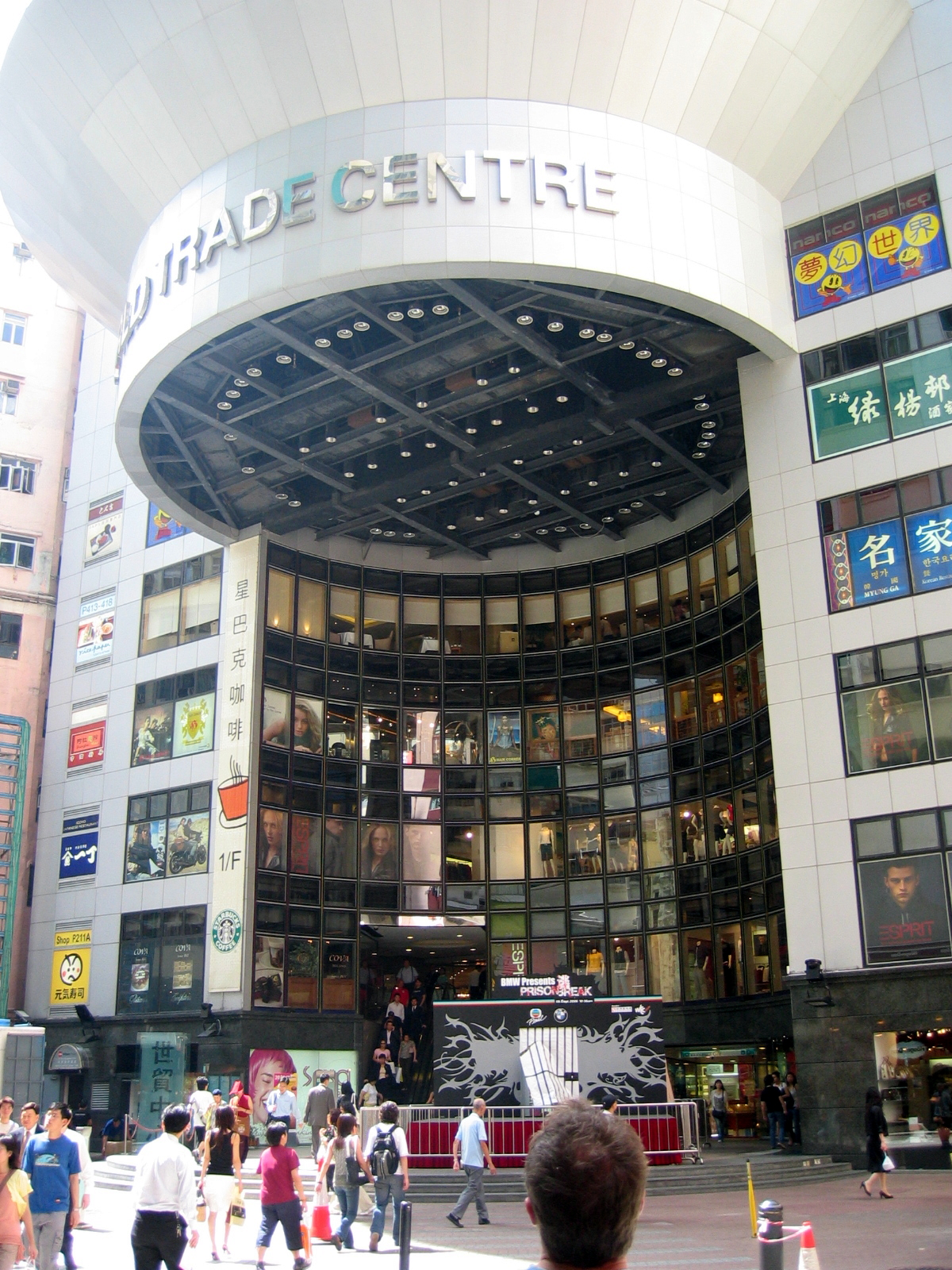
World Trade Centre before renovation in August 2006, viewed from Jaffe Road.

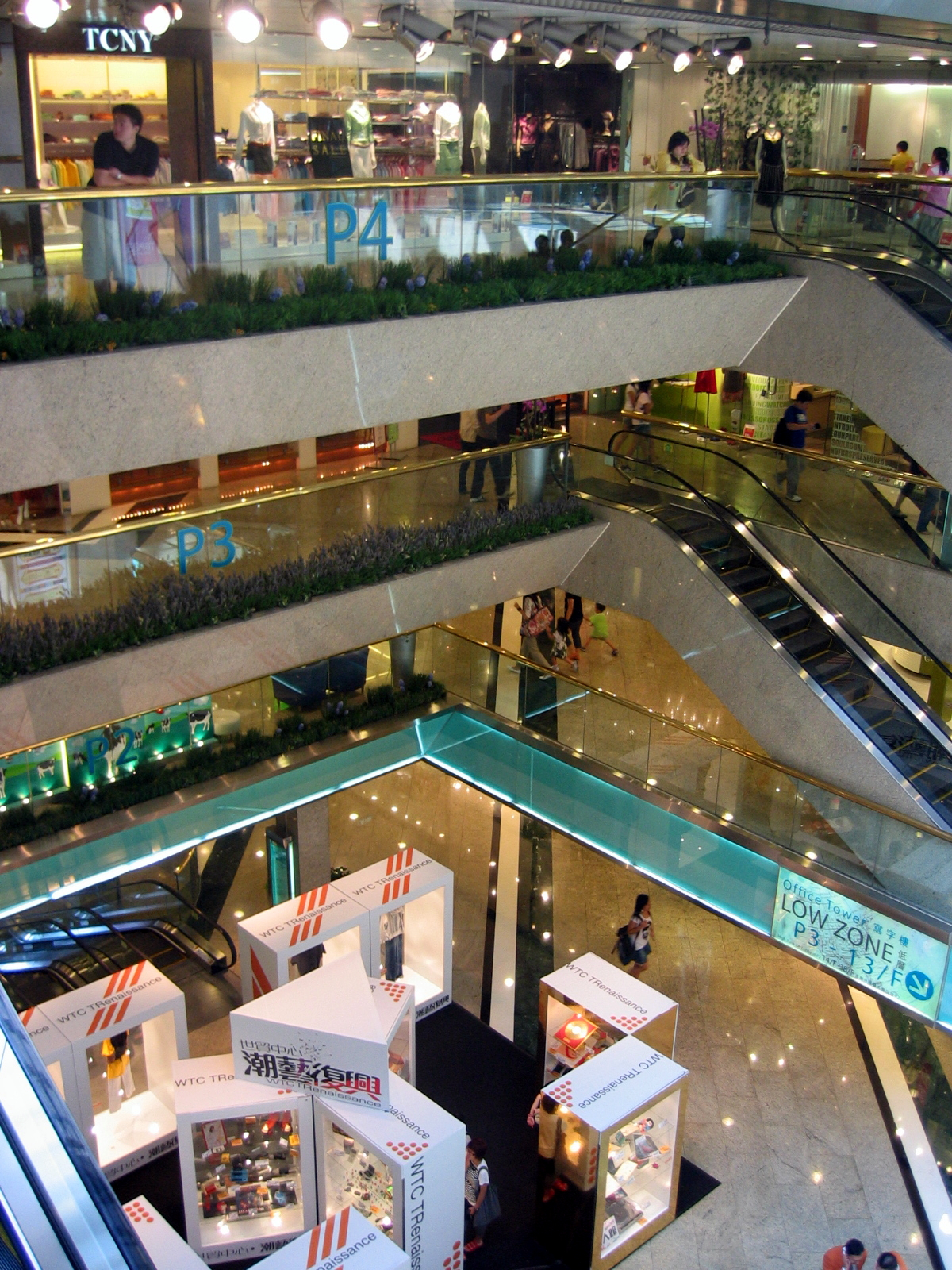
World Trade Centre shopping arcade before renovation in August 2006.

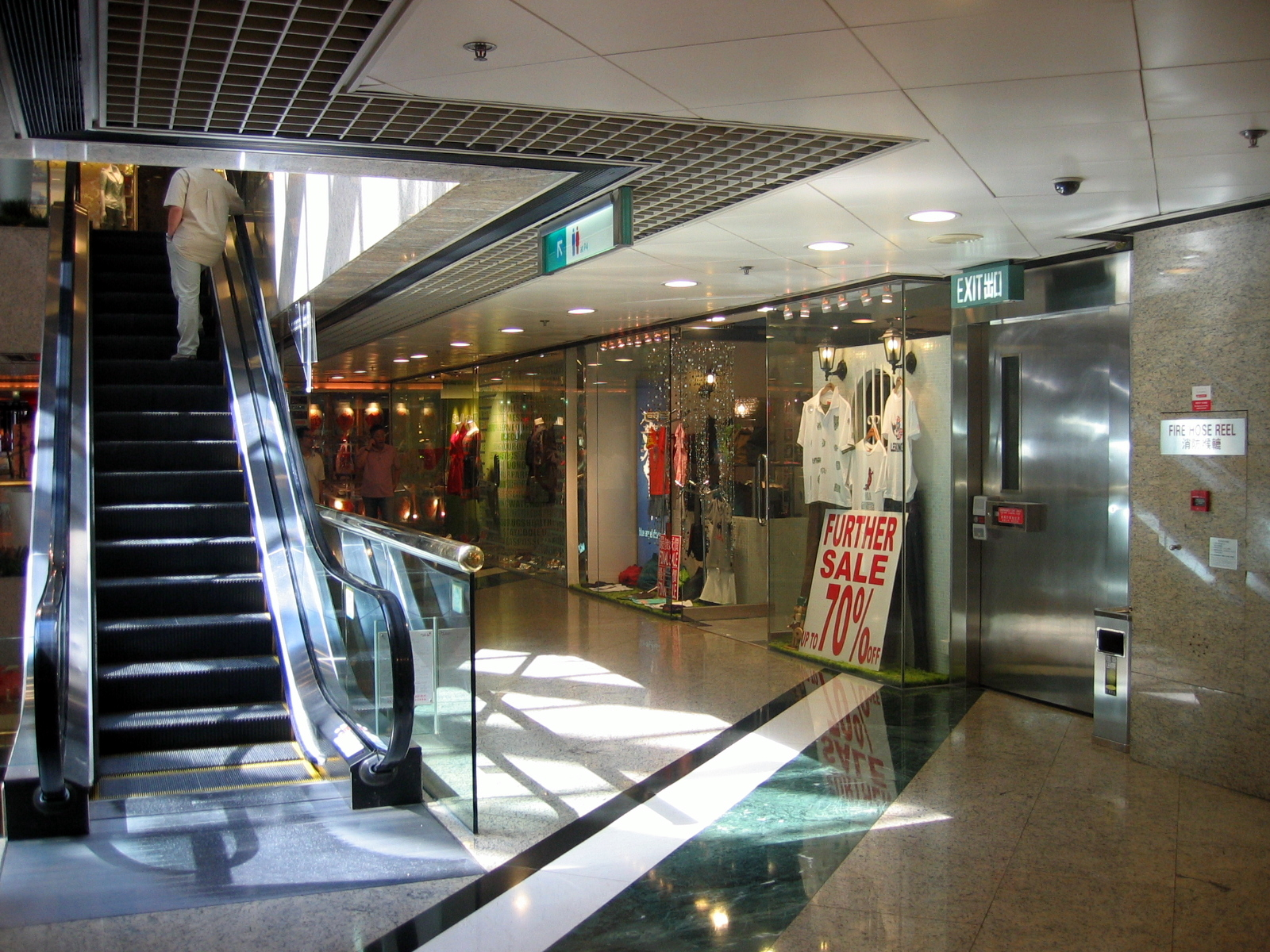
World Trade Centre before renovation in August 2006.

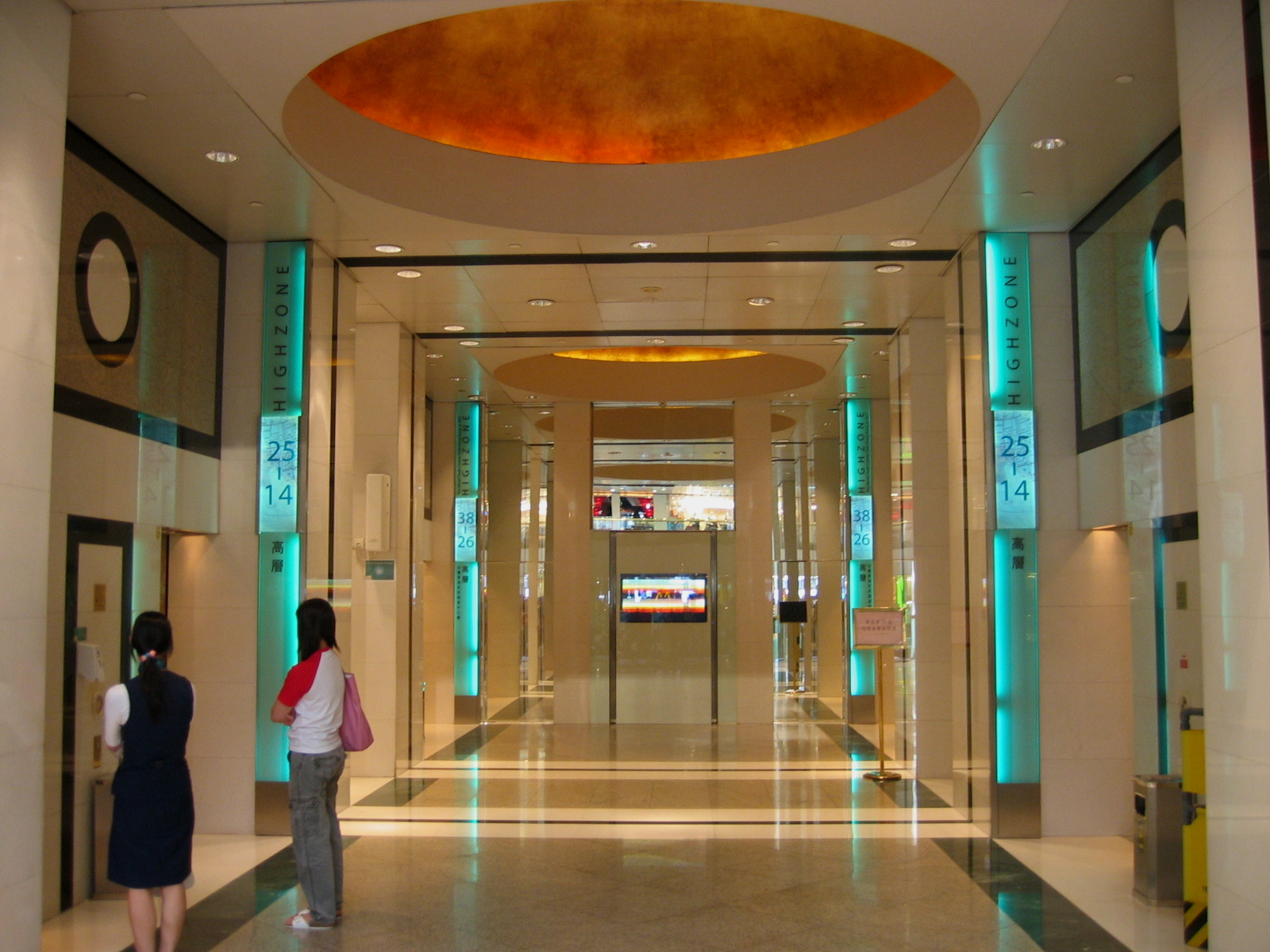
World Trade Centre office lobby before renovation in August 2006.

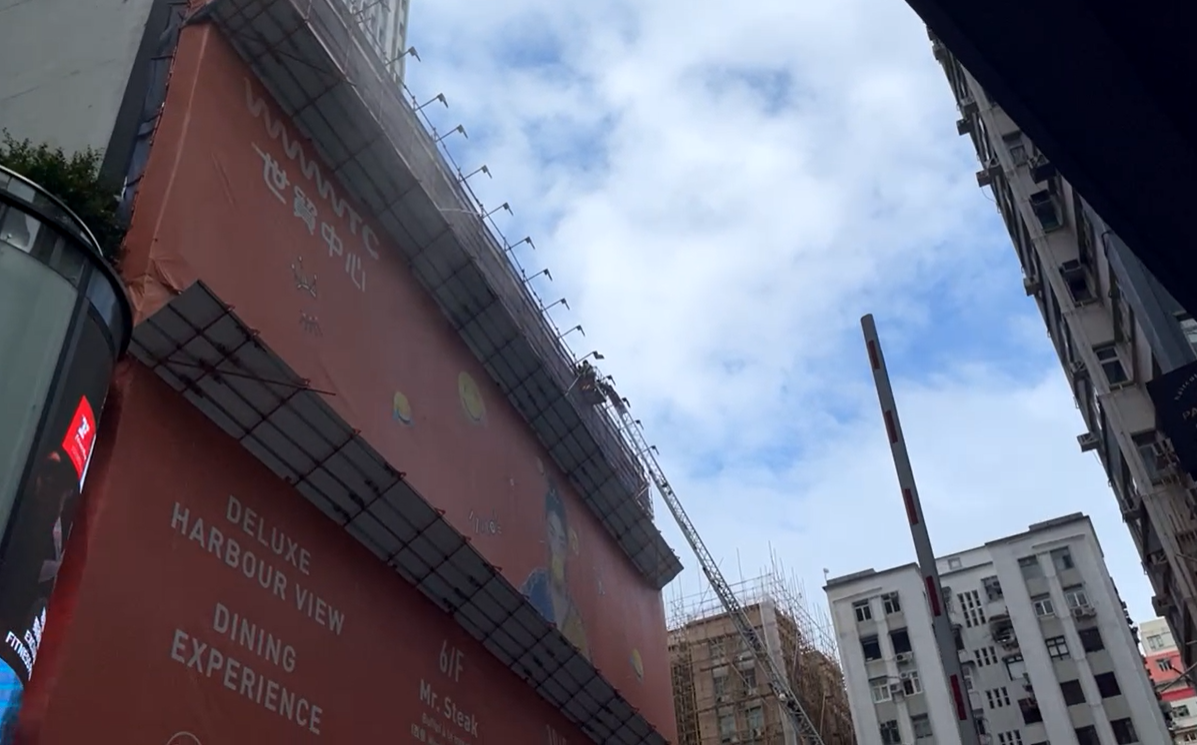
On 15 December 2021, a fire broke out in the World Trade Centre

== Shopping arcade renovation ==
In August 2006, Sun Hung Kai Properties announced that the centre will be expanded for HK$200 million, which included: expansion of number of floors from 6 to 15, additional glass on the floors, walls between shops made of glass, giant LED screen in the entrance, new design of whole centre and other small changes. Also, the working hours were extended, and World Trade Centre renamed as WTC.

The first phase of shopping arcade renovation started in October 2006. The floors built on this phase were shops and also office areas and a big exhibition hall on 13th floor.

Food & Beverage outlets opened in January 2008 include Hea Place (9/F), Ruby Tuesday, Kung Tak Lam Shanghai Vegetarian Cuisine (10/F), Shanghai Lu Yang Cun Restaurant (11/F), Dragon King Restaurant (12/F), Myung Ga Korean Restaurant and Kiriyaki (13/F).

In February 2009, another renovation phase was held, which made multi-floor shops possible, thereafter the agnès b. store is located on 1st and 2nd floor, Muji and Uniqlo on 4th and 5th floor and Seaview Restaurant and mYoga yoga center on other floors. Most of the shops become vacant on 2019 and P1-5 level closed in December 2020 for the large scale renovation again.

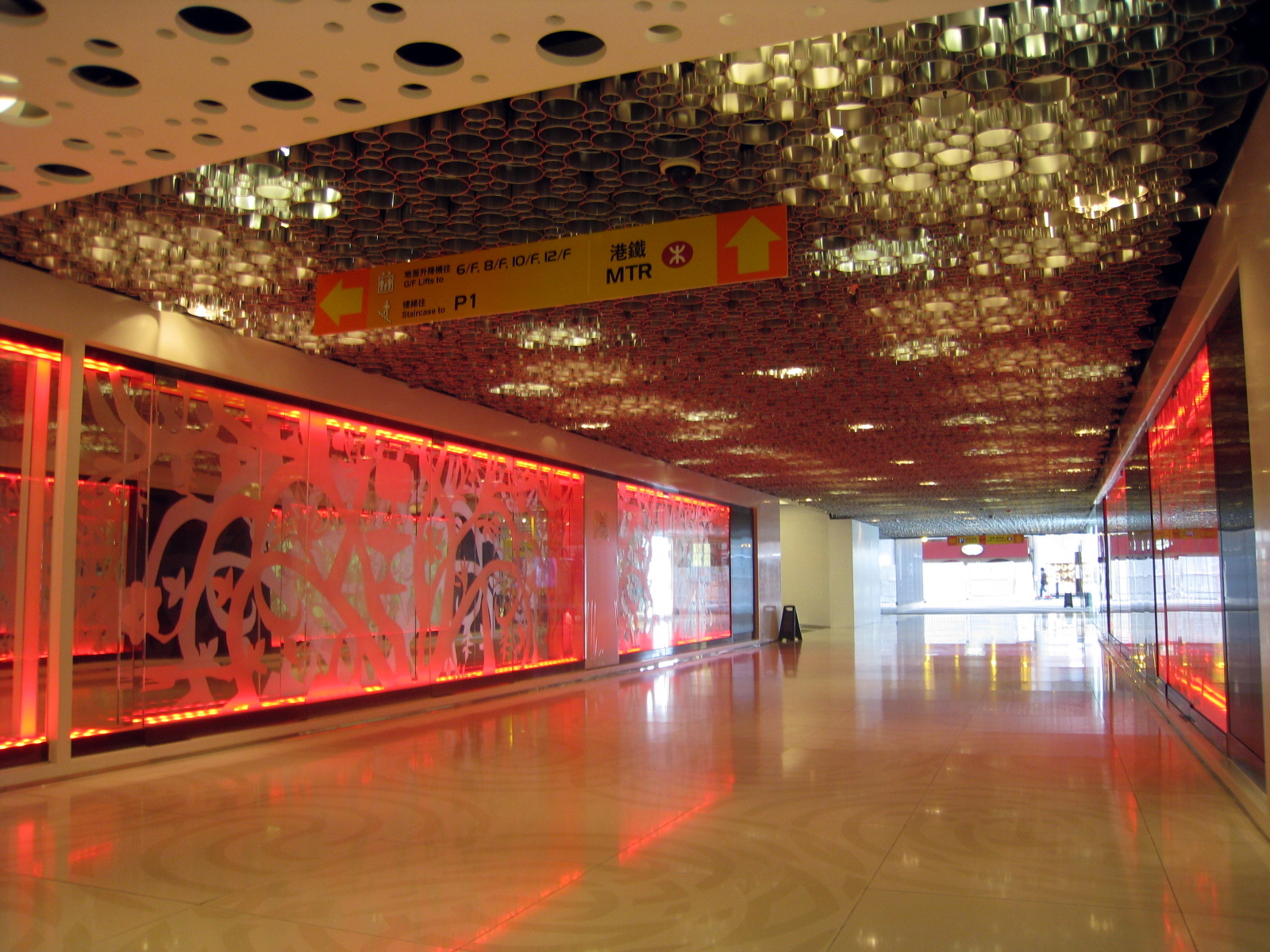
Ground floor access in February 2009

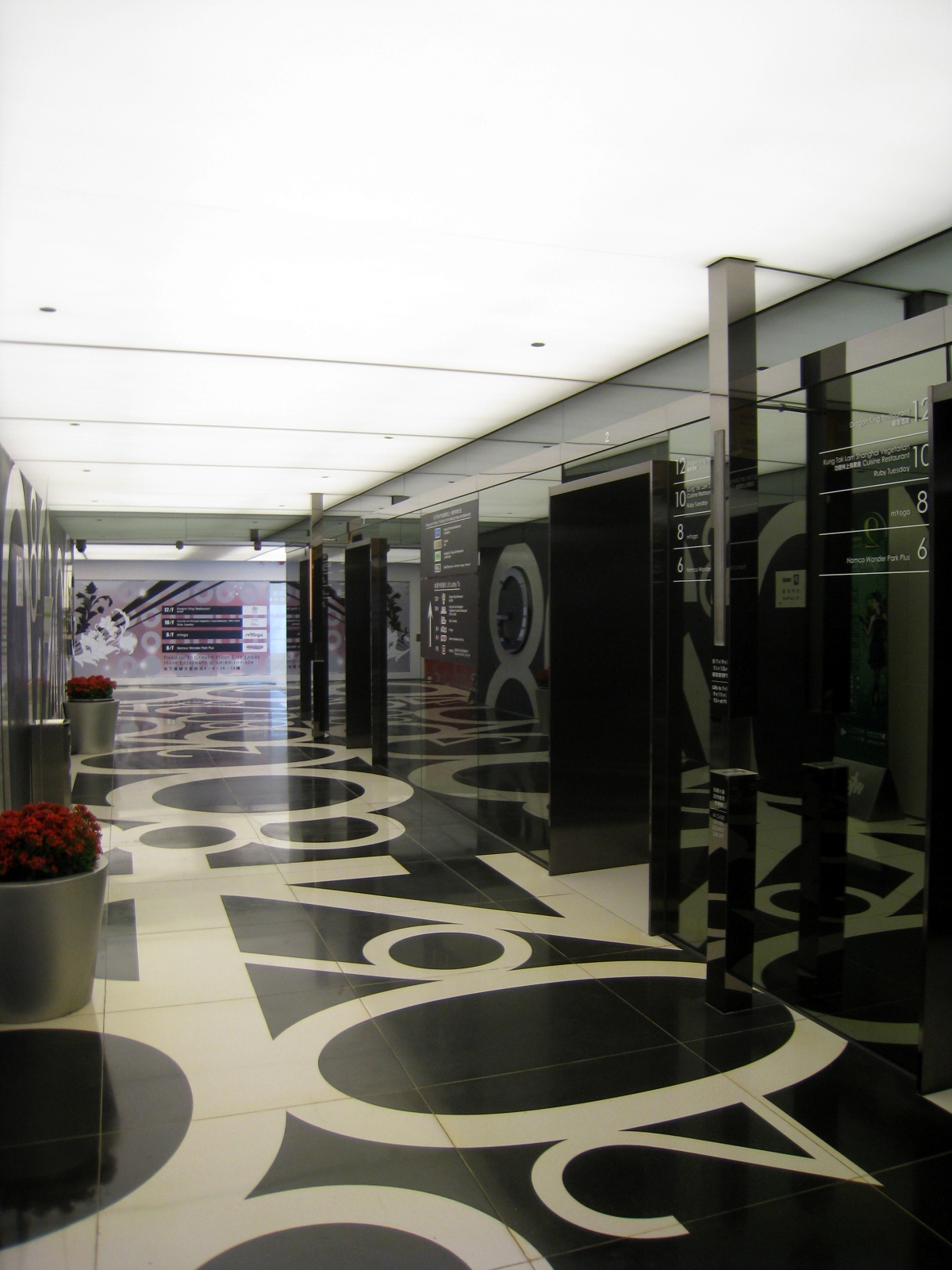
Ground floor lift lobby in February 2009

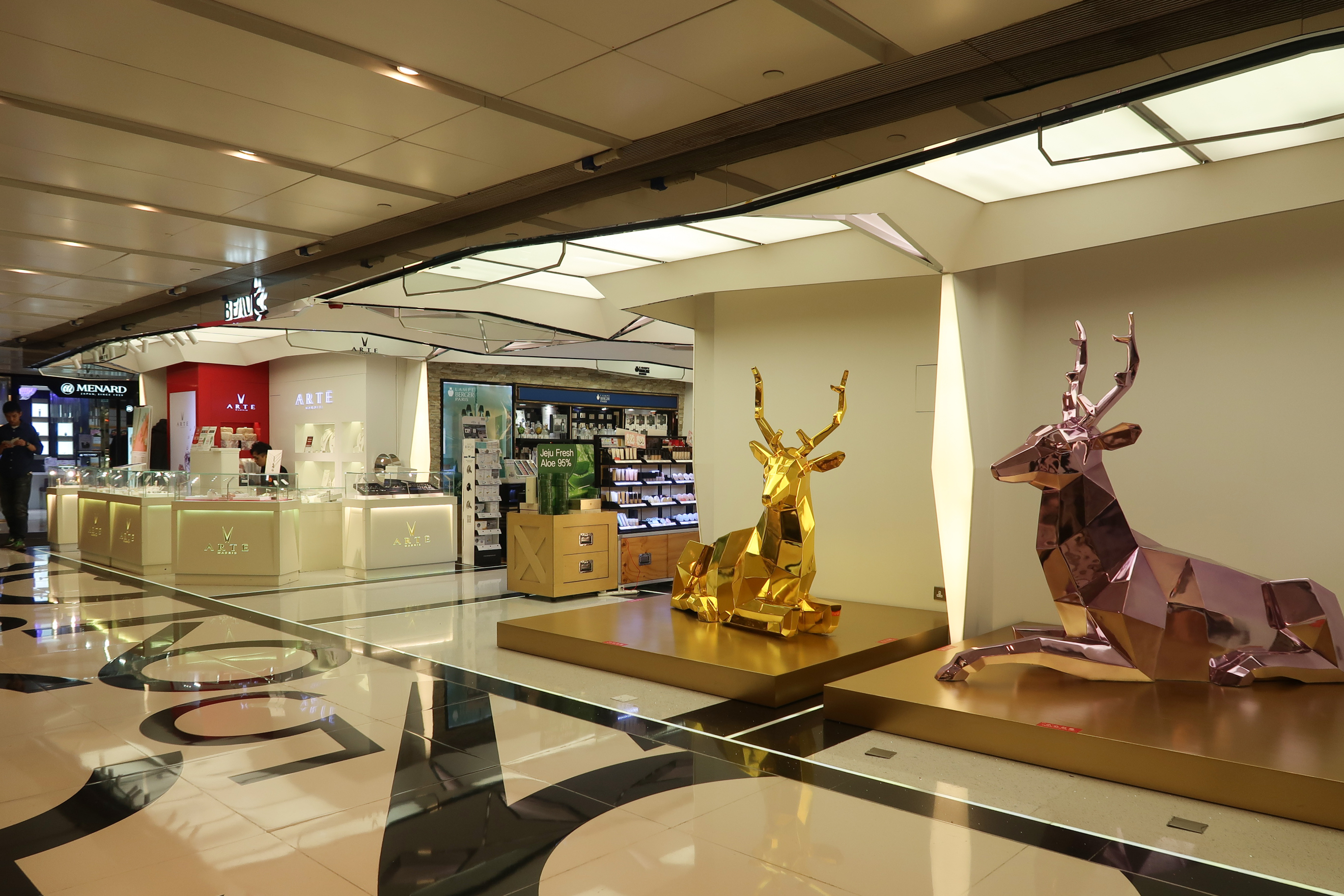
Beauty wtc

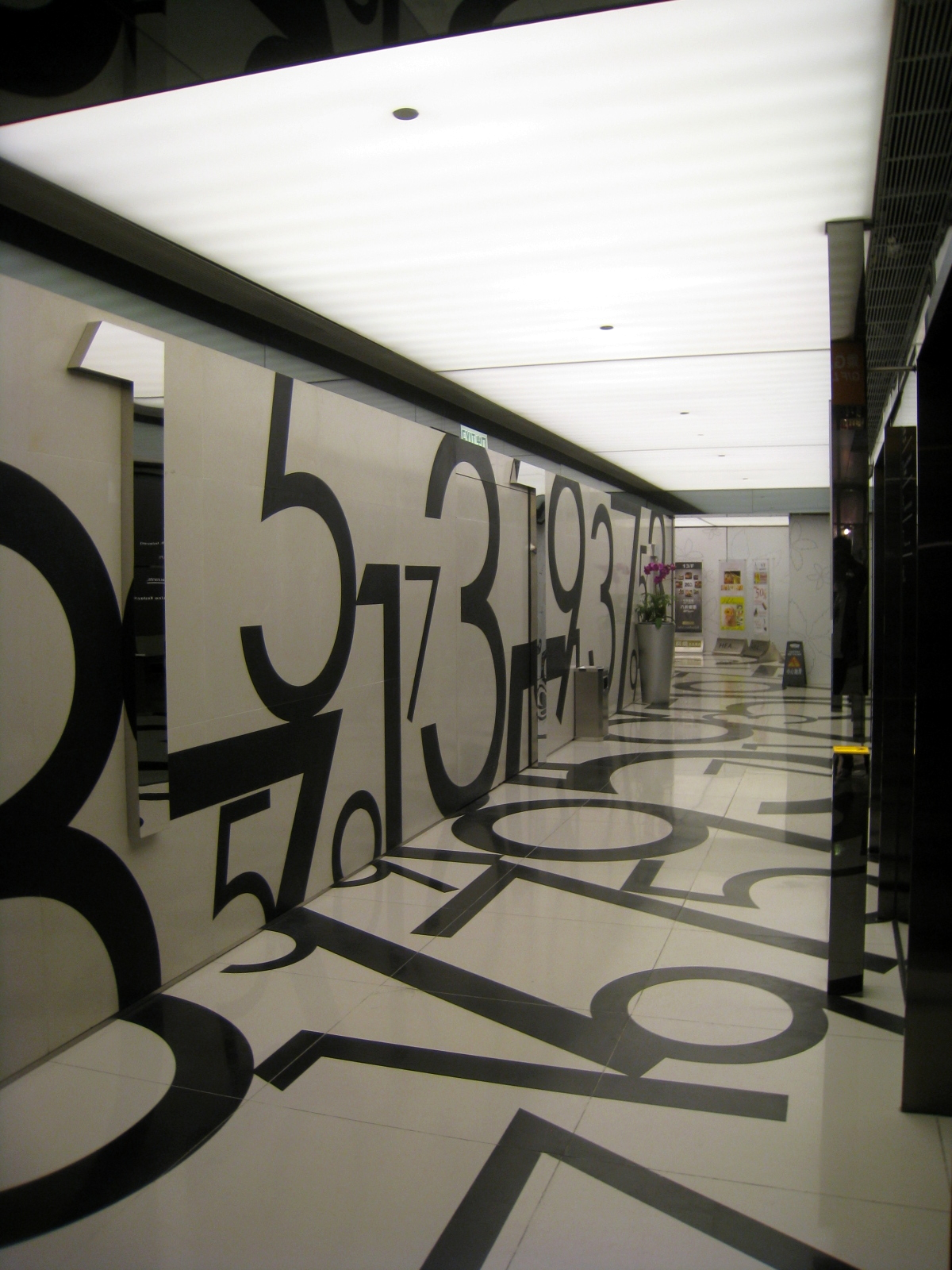
Level 1 lift lobby in February 2009

== Palace Theatre Cinema ==
After being converted from a nightclub, Palace Theatre Cinema was opened on 14 November 1979 by Shaw Brothers Studio. The cinema was regarded as one of the most extravagant in Hong Kong; whereas normal prime seats would cost 10 Hong Kong dollars (HKD), the cheapest seat in Palace Theatre costs 12 HKD. The 1060 larger and wider seats, the luxurious lobby, and the middle to upper class clientele signaled the birth of high-end cinemas for Hong Kong movie-goers.

The films shown were primarily from the West; the first film was Aliens. In 1981, Palace Theatre showed Somewhere in Time starring Christopher Reeve, which remained in cinemas for 223 days, a record length for Hong Kong at the time. Between the period of 12 September 1981 and 22 April 1982, the box office at Palace Jade made 9.38 million HKD, also establishing a new record for foreign movies. Among other films, Palace Jade showed American Gigolo and A Clockwork Orange exclusively.

By the time the WTC changed ownership in 1994, the competitiveness of the single-screen Palace Theatre Cinema was less profitable than the newer multi-screen combined cinemas in the Causeway Bay area; the lease was not renewed, and the cinema closed by year end.

== Transport ==
The World Trade Centre can be reached through exit D1 in MTR's Causeway Bay station.
