= Kam Peng Estate =

Public housing estate in Peng Chau, Hong Kong

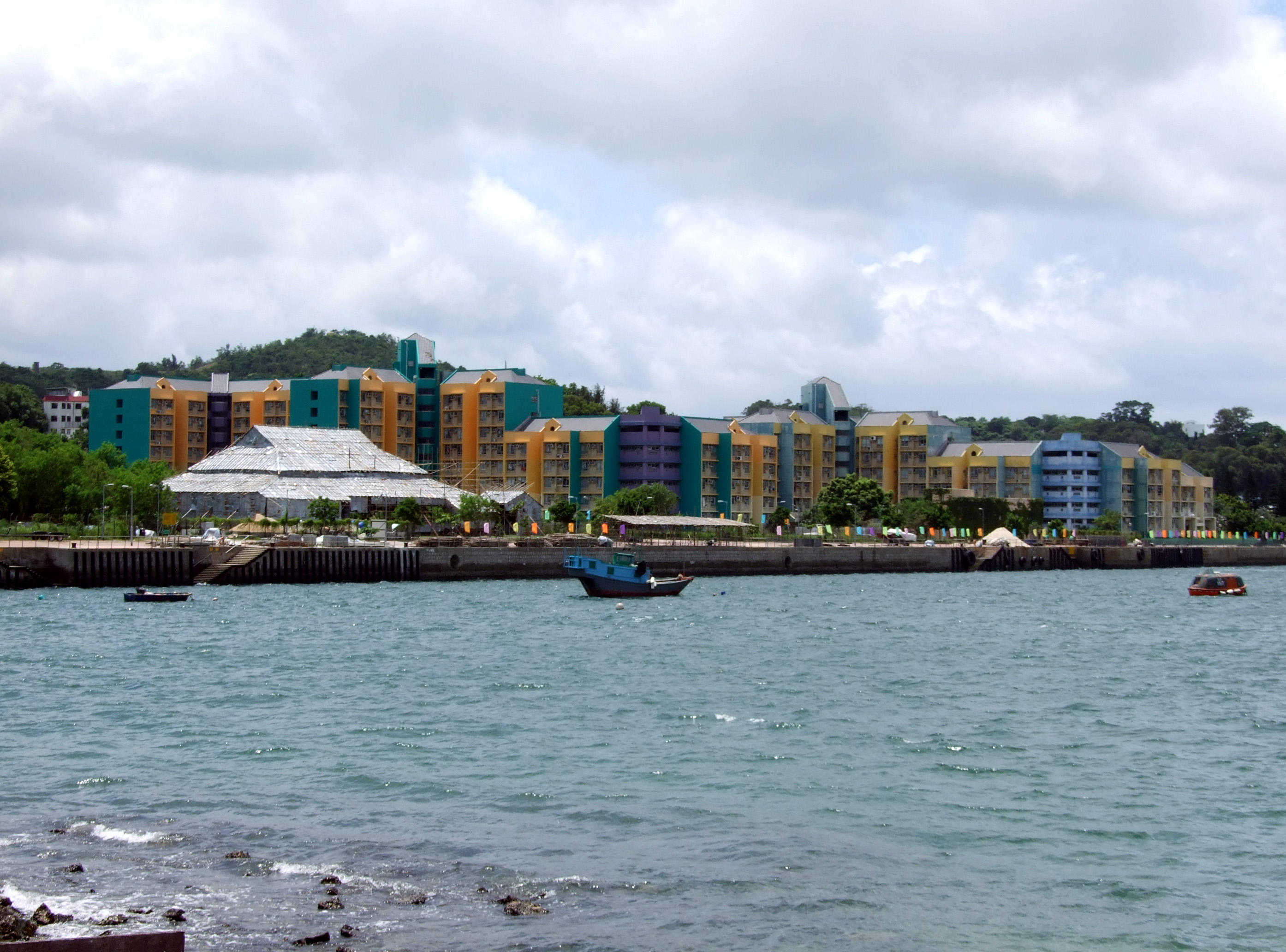
- Kam Peng Estate and Peng Lai Court
- Interactive map of Kam Peng Estate

General information
- Location: 21 Peng Lei Road, Peng Chau; New Territories, Hong Kong
- Coordinates: 22.287100°N 114.037200°E
- Status: Completed
- Category: Public rental housing
- No. of blocks: 1
- No. of units: 261

Construction
- Constructed: 1996; 30 years ago
- Authority: Hong Kong Housing Authority

Kam Peng Estate (Chinese: 金坪邨) is a public housing estate in Peng Chau, New Territories, Hong Kong. It is the only public housing estate in Peng Chau, and has only one residential block built in 1996.

Peng Lai Court (Chinese: 坪麗苑) is the only Home Ownership Scheme court in Peng Chau near Kam Peng Estate. It has only one residential block built in 1996.

== Houses ==
=== Kam Peng Estate ===
Name	Chinese name	Building type	Completed
Kam Peng House	金坪樓	Harmony Rural 2	1996

=== Peng Lai Court ===
Name	Chinese name	Building type	Completed
Peng Lai Court	坪麗苑	Harmony Rural 3	1996

== Politics ==
Kam Peng Estate and Peng Lai Court are located in Peng Chau & Hei Ling Chau constituency of the Islands District Council. It is currently represented by Josephine Tsang Sau-ho, who was elected in the 2019 elections.

== See also ==
- Public housing estates on outlying islands of Hong Kong
