= Peng Chau Kaito =

Hong Kong ferry operator

Peng Chau Kaito Ltd
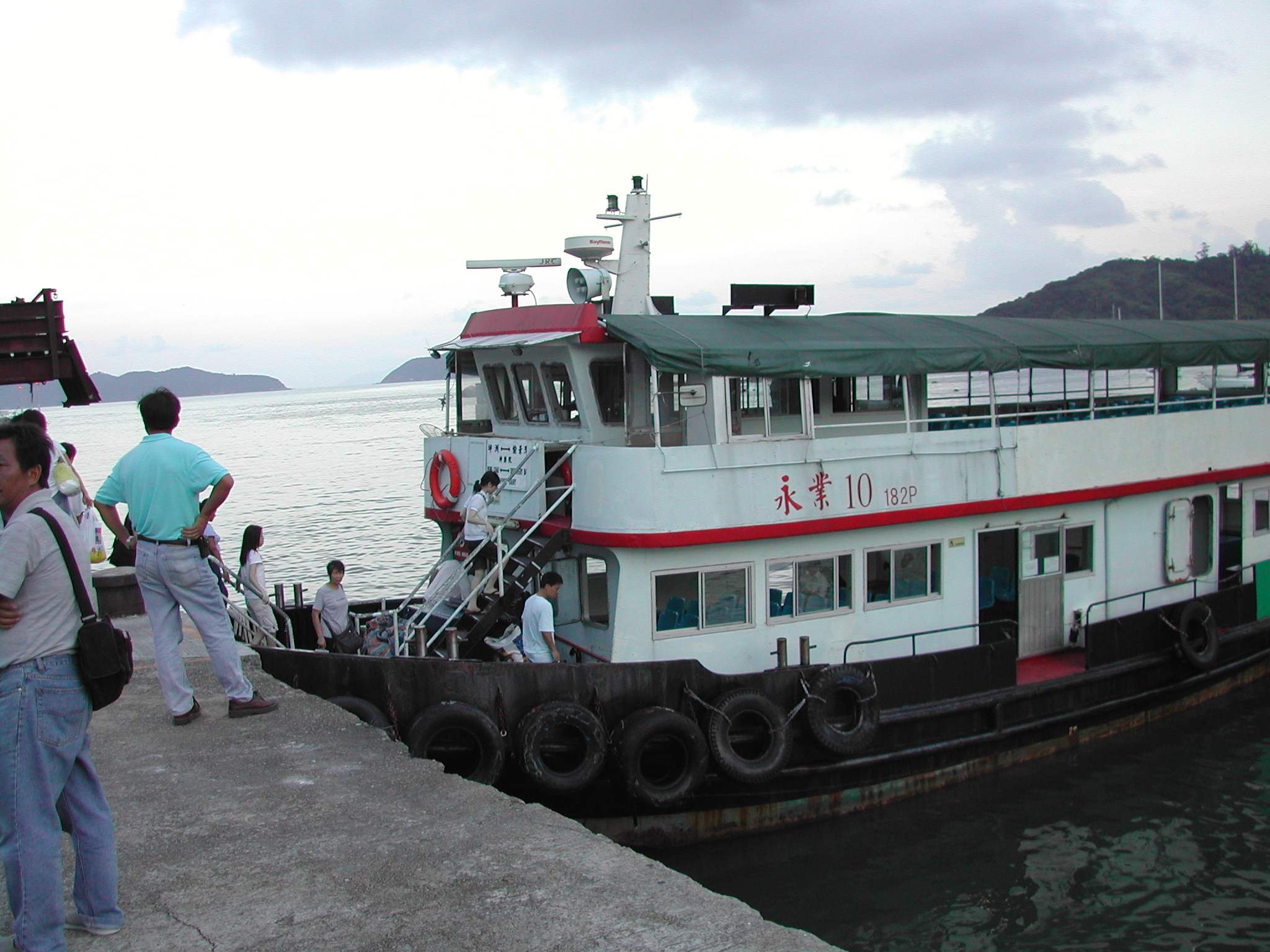
- Kai-to berthed at the Discovery Bay Kai-To Dock in Nim Shue Wan
- Native name: 坪洲街渡有限公司
- Company type: Ferry operator
- Industry: Transportation
- Headquarters: 3/F, 70, Nam Wan, Peng Chau, Hong Kong
- Area served: Outlying Islands
- Owner: Ken Wong Hon-kuen
- Website: https://pengchaukaito.com

Peng Chau Kaito
- Traditional Chinese: 坪洲街渡有限公司
Transcriptions
Yue: Cantonese
- Yale Romanization: Pìhng jāu gāai douh yáuh haahn gūng sī
- Jyutping: Ping4 zau1 gaai1 dou6 yau5 haan6 gung1 si1

Peng Chau Kaito Limited, more commonly known as Peng Chau Kaito (Chinese: 坪洲街渡), is a small kai-to ferry operator in Hong Kong. The company runs services between Peng Chau and Discovery Bay (Nim Shue Wan) with occasional stops at the Trappist Monastery on Lantau Island, as well as the route between Discovery Bay and Mui Wo. The main route between Peng Chau and Discovery Bay received an estimated 1,420 passengers per day in 2013. The company also offers vessel hire. The routes which serve Peng Chau make use of the Peng Chau Public Pier.

== Service ==
In 2012, the company was granted permission from the government to reduce the frequency of its route between Discovery Bay and Mui Wo to reduce costs which had risen due to an increase in fuel prices. The service was suspended the following year as a result of extra requirements the government imposed in the wake of the 2012 Lamma Island ferry collision.

== Fleet ==
The company maintains a fleet of 3 vessels:

- Wing Yip No.10 (永業10號)
  - Built in 1990, the launch was produced in Guangdong Province, China. The vessel serves mainly the Peng Chau >> Trappist Monastery >> Discovery Bay route. Registration number: A5573
- Ma Wan No.1 (馬灣1號)
  - Built in 1995 in Zhuhai, Guangdong Province, China. The ferry has an air-conditioned lower deck. The vessel mainly runs the route between Mui Wo and Discovery Bay. Registration number: A9433
- Sing Way 3 (聲威3號)
  - Serves the Peng Chau >> Trappist Monastery >> Discovery Bay route. Registration number: A6093

== Fare ==
The following table outlines the fare for the Peng Chau >> Discovery Bay route.

Peng Chau to Discovery Bay service
Adult	HK$7.5
Child (between 1 and 5 years)	HK$3
Bicycles / animals	HK$6
Octopus card is usable on this service. Passengers paying in cash will not receive change.

== See also ==
- Transport in Hong Kong
