= Peng Chau Public Pier =

Peng Chau Public Pier 坪洲公眾碼頭
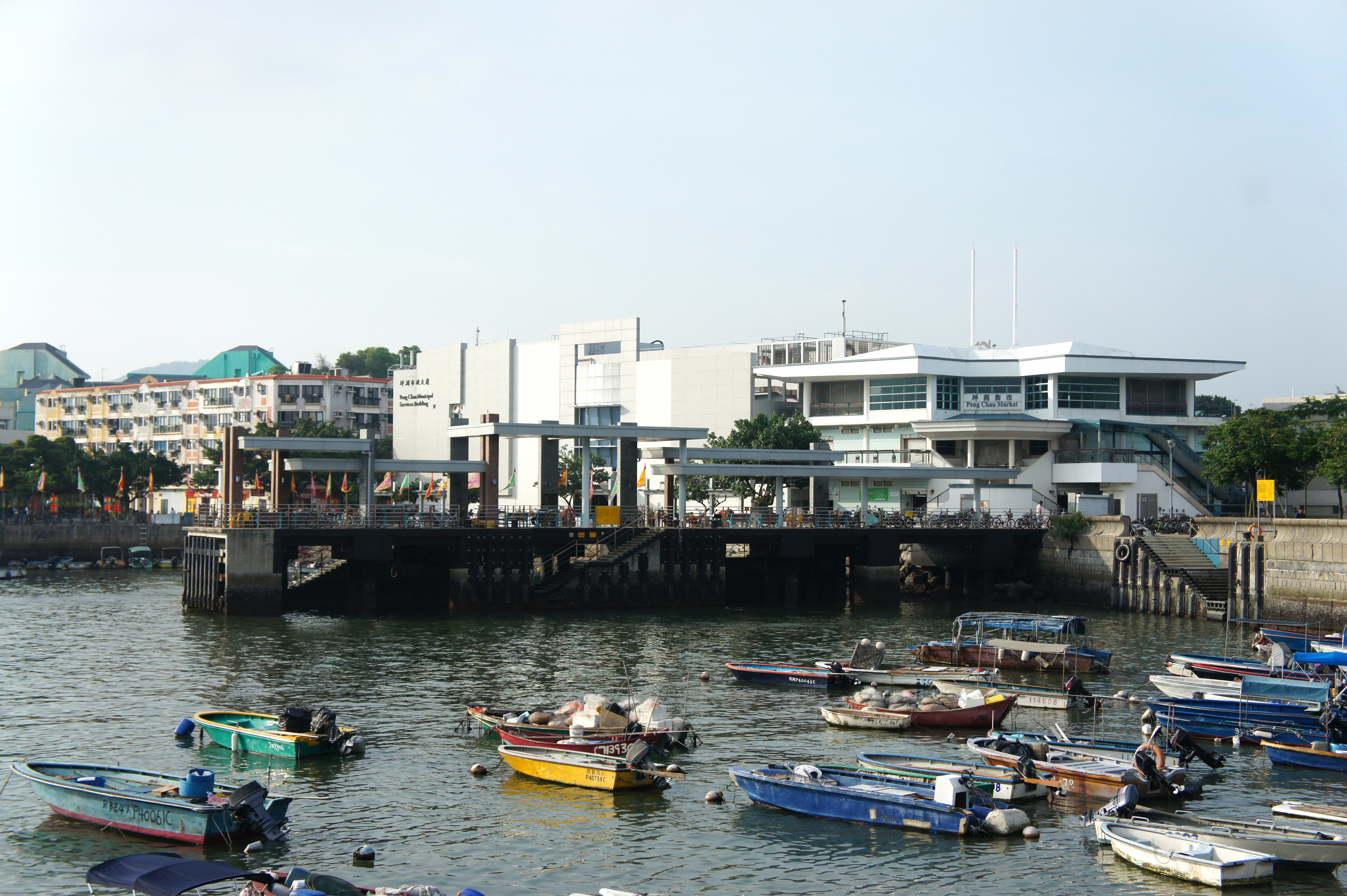
- Peng Chau Public Pier in June 2012
- Location: Wing On Side Street, Peng Chau
- Coordinates: 22°17′03″N 114°02′16″E
- Operator: Transport Department
- Maintained by: Civil Engineering and Development Department

Characteristics
- ID number: IP055
- Construction: 2004; 22 years ago

Peng Chau Public Pier
- Traditional Chinese: 坪洲公眾碼頭
- Simplified Chinese: 坪洲公众码头
Transcriptions
Standard Mandarin
- Hanyu Pinyin: Píngzhōu Gōngzhòng Mǎtóu
Yue: Cantonese
- Yale Romanization: Pìhng jāu gūng jung máh tàuh
- Jyutping: Ping^{4} zau^{1} gung^{1} zung^{3} maa^{5} tau^{4}

Peng Chau Public Pier (Chinese: 坪洲公眾碼頭) is a public pier in Peng Chau, New Territories, Hong Kong. It is located in Wing On Side Street (Chinese: 永安橫街) and next to Peng Chau Ferry Pier (Chinese: 坪洲渡輪碼頭). The old pier was built in 1955 and replaced by the new one in 2004. The pier is mainly for loading and unloading of goods, and running kai-to operation between Peng Chau and Nim Shue Wan in Discovery Bay via Trappist Haven Monastery on Lantau Island.
