= Great China Match Company Factory =

- 大中國火柴廠

General information
- Status: Abandoned
- Type: Factory
- Location: Peng Chau, New Territories, Hong Kong
- Construction started: 1939

Great China Match Company Factory
- Traditional Chinese: 大中國火柴廠
- Simplified Chinese: 大中国火柴厂
Transcriptions
Standard Mandarin
- Hanyu Pinyin: Dà Zhōngguó Huǒchái Chǎng
Yue: Cantonese
- Yale Romanization: Daaih Jūng gwok fó chàaih chóng
- Jyutping: Daai^{6} Zung^{1} gwok^{3} fo^{2} caai^{4} cong^{2}

The Great China Match Company Factory (Chinese: 大中國火柴廠) was a large-scale manufacturing facility producing matches. The factory was located on the island of Peng Chau in Hong Kong. The facility was completed towards the end of the 1930s and was at one point the largest such factory in South East Asia.

== History ==
The Great China Match Company Factory was founded by Ong-Sung Lieu (劉鴻生), Kyih-Sung Lieu (劉吉生), and T.L. Soong (宋子良) in 1939. The factory on Peng Chau was established as the Great China Match Company relocated its operations from Mainland China to escape the advancing Japanese occupation of China. Cheung Chau was initially explored as a site for the factory, however this idea was later abandoned as residents were fearful of the dangers of having such a volatile facility on their island. Peng Chau was chosen as the site as the residents of the island were eager to create employment opportunities following the closure of the large lime production facilities on the island. The business was originally established with HK$300,000 of capital.

The factory commenced operations in April 1940 with 580 employees. During the 1940s, the factory was one of the largest employers in Hong Kong with between 1,000 and 2,000 employees.

During the Second World War, the factory was seized by the Japanese military between November 1942 and August 1943.

In January 1948, there was an explosion at the factory which led to the death of one employee, and injured another.

In November 1952, a drastic reduction in demand from South Asia forced the company to close the factory and fire over 640 workers, however, a surge in demand from South East Asia prompted the company to reopen the factory in January 1953.

The introduction of lighters led to a steep decline in demand for matches and the factory was finally closed in 1976.

== See also ==
- History of Hong Kong
- List of places in Hong Kong
