= Public housing estates on outlying islands of Hong Kong =

Public housing on islands of Hong Kong

This is a list of public housing estates on the outlying islands of Hong Kong.

== Overview ==
Name		Type	Inaug.	No Blocks	No Units	Location
Cheung Kwai Estate	長貴邨	Public	1984	18	472	Cheung Chau
Nga Ning Court	雅寧苑	Public	2001	3	422	Cheung Chau
Kam Peng Estate	金坪邨	Public	1996	1	253	Peng Chau
Peng Lai Court	坪麗苑	HOS	1996	1	148	Peng Chau

== Cheung Kwai Estate ==
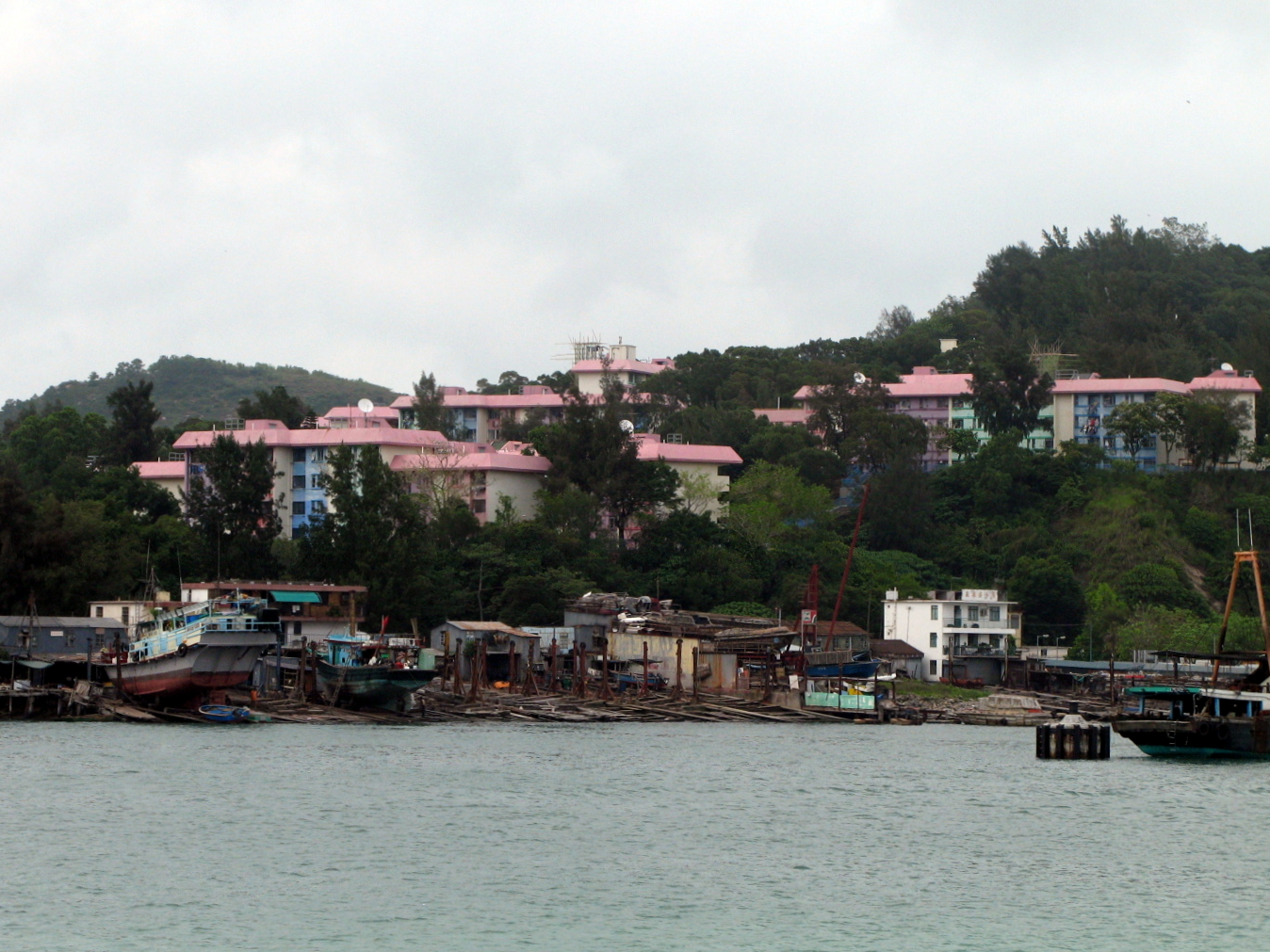
Cheung Kwai Estate

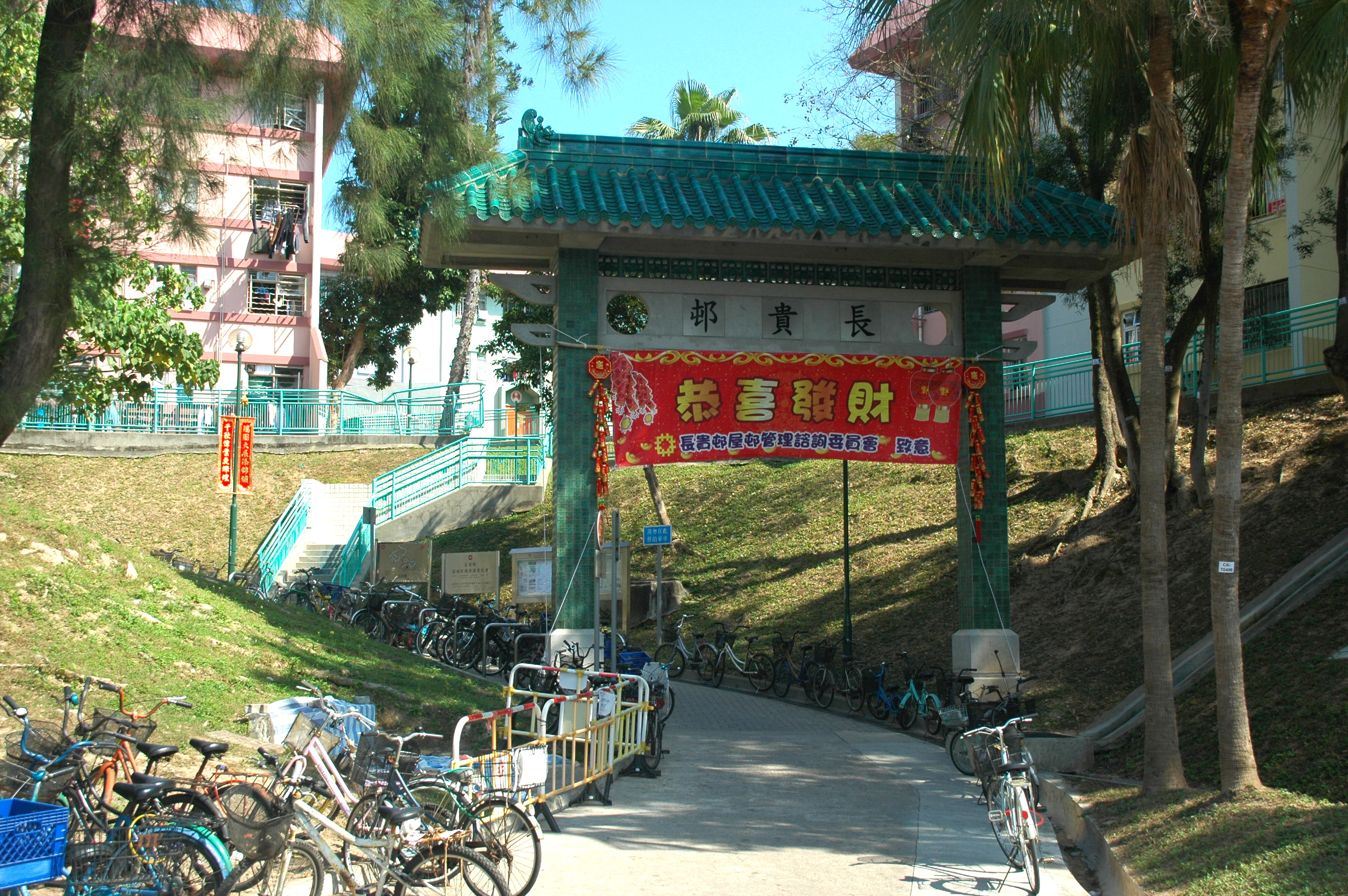
Cheung Kwai Estate

Cheung Kwai Estate (Chinese: 長貴邨) is the first public housing estate on Cheung Chau. It consists of 18 residential blocks and accommodates 1,800 people.

Name	Type	Completion
Cheung Chi House	Non-standard	1984
Cheung Fung House	Non-standard	1984
Cheung Foon House	Non-standard	1984
Cheung Fat House	Non-standard	1984
Cheung Fu House	Non-standard	1984
Cheung Hing House	Non-standard	1984
Cheung King House	Non-standard	1984
Cheung Kwong House	Non-standard	1984
Cheung Lok House	Non-standard	1984
Cheung Nga House	Non-standard	1984
Cheung Shing House	Non-standard	1984
Cheung Shun House	Non-standard	1984
Cheung Tak House	Non-standard	1984
Cheung Wing House	Non-standard	1984
Cheung Wah House	Non-standard	1984
Cheung Wong House	Non-standard	1984
Cheung Yick House	Non-standard	1984
Cheung Yu House	Non-standard	1984

== Nga Ning Court ==
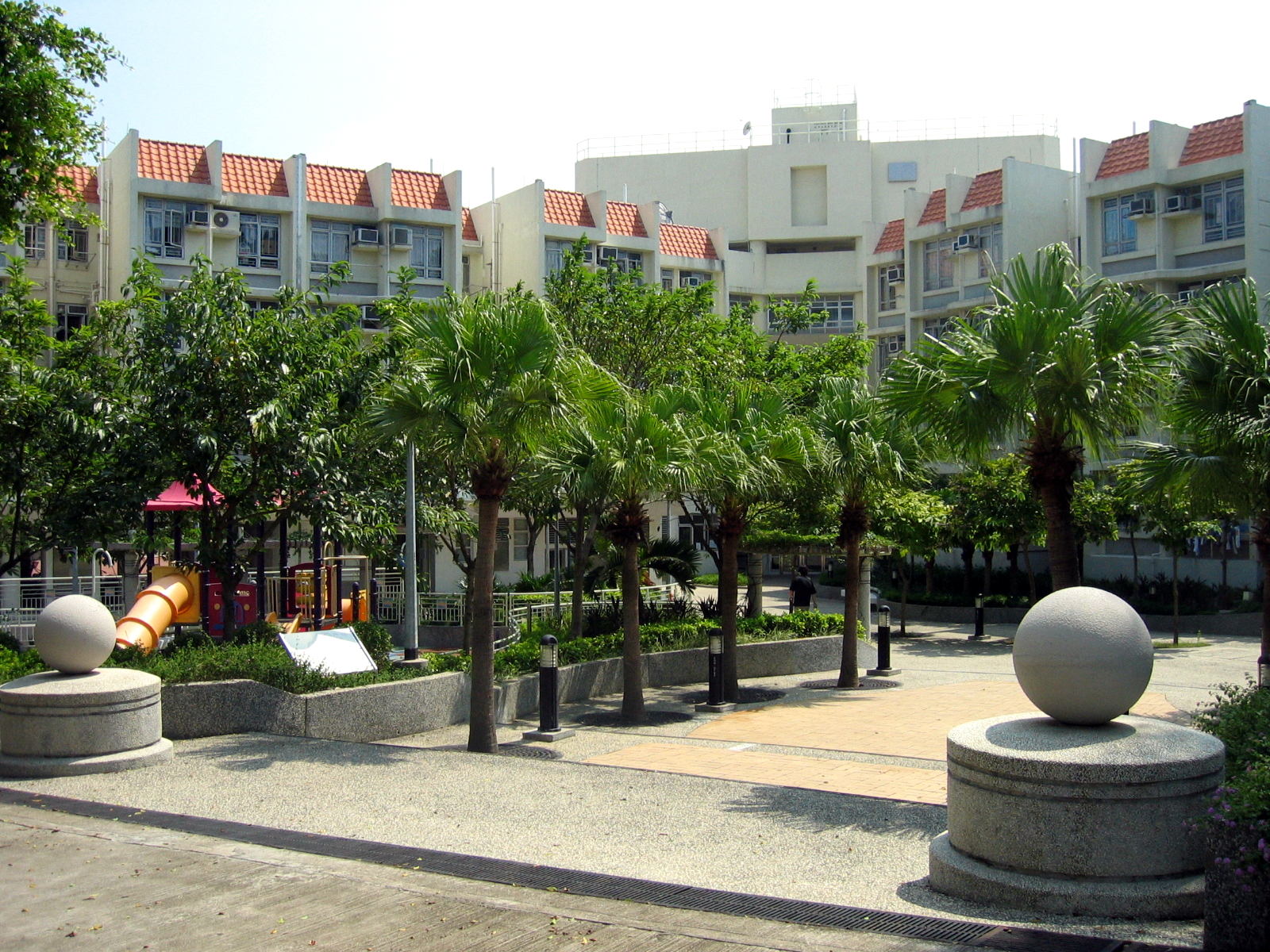
Nga Ning Court

Nga Ning Court (Chinese: 雅寧苑) is a public housing estate on Cheung Chau. It has 3 residential blocks completed in 2001. It was originally a HOS estate, but the government decided to convert it to rental housing.

Name	Type	Completion
Chun Chak House	Harmony Rural 3	2001
Leung Chak House	Harmony Rural 3	2001
Ho Chak House	Harmony Rural 3	2001

== Kam Peng Estate ==
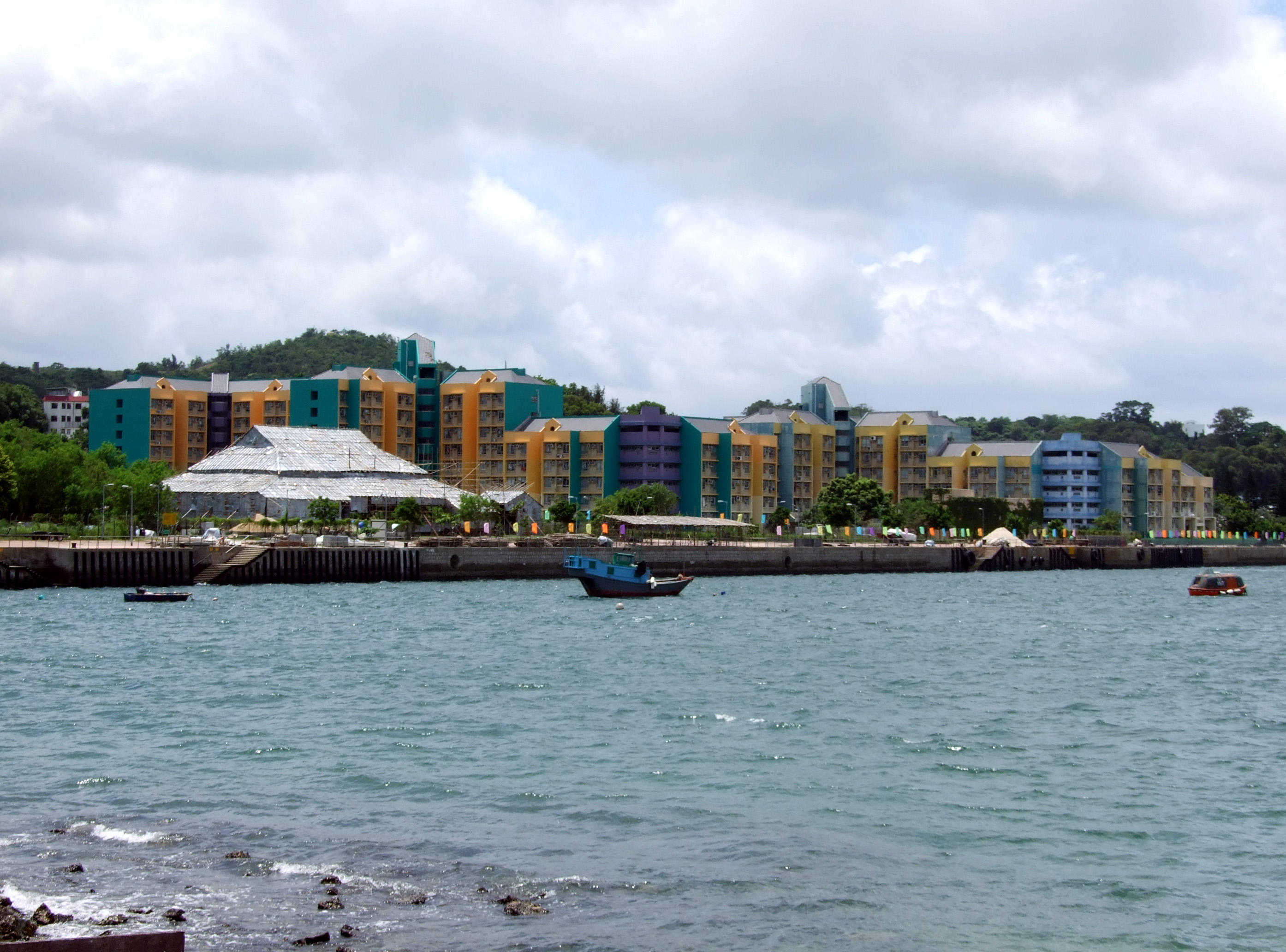
Kam Peng Estate and Peng Lai Court

Kam Peng Estate (Chinese: 金坪邨) is the only public housing estate on Peng Chau. It has only one residential block built in 1996.

Name	Type	Completion
Kam Peng House	Harmony Rural 2	1996

== Peng Lai Court ==
Peng Lai Court (Chinese: 坪麗苑) is the only Home Ownership Scheme court on Peng Chau. It has only one residential block built in 1996.

Name	Type	Completion
Peng Lai Court	Harmony Rural 3	1996

== See also ==
- Public housing in Hong Kong
- List of public housing estates in Hong Kong
