= Peng Chau & Hei Ling Chau (constituency) =

Constituency of the Islands District Council of Hong Kong

- Elected constituency for the Islands District Council
- Boundary of Peng Chau & Hei Ling Chau in Islands District
- District: Islands
- Legislative Council constituency: Hong Kong Island West
- Population: 6,622 (2019)
- Electorate: 3,630 (2019)

Current constituency
- Created: 1994
- Number of members: One
- Member: vacant

Peng Chau & Hei Ling Chau (Chinese: 坪洲及喜靈洲) is one of the 10 constituencies in the Islands District in Hong Kong. The constituency returns one district councillor to the Islands District Council, with an election every four years.

Peng Chau & Hei Ling Chau constituency is loosely based on islands of Peng Chau, Hei Ling Chau, Sunshine Island, Kau Yi Chau and Nim Shue Wan on Lantau Island with an estimated population of 6,622.

== Councillors represented ==
Election	Member	Party
1994	Ma Chun-tim	Independent
1999	Wong Hoi-yue	Independent
2007	Ma Chun-tim	Independent
2011	On Hing-ying	Independent
2014 by-election	Josephine Tsang Sau-ho→vacant	Independent

== Election results ==
=== 2010s ===
Islands District Council Election, 2019: Peng Chau & Hei Ling Chau
Party	Candidate	Votes	%	±%
Nonpartisan	Josephine Tsang Sau-ho	1,499	57.83	
Nonpartisan	Tsui Yat-long	1,093	42.17	
Majority		406	15.66	
Turnout		2,604	71.76	
Independent hold		Swing		

Islands District Council Election, 2015: Peng Chau & Hei Ling Chau
Party	Candidate	Votes	%	±%
Independent	Josephine Tsang Sau-ho	Uncontested		
Independent hold		Swing		

Peng Chau & Hei Ling Chau by-election, 2014
Party	Candidate	Votes	%	±%
Independent	Josephine Tsang Sau-ho	1,249	55.1	
Independent	Wong Chi-lam	697	31.1	
Independent	Chan Chi-lin	296	13.2	
Majority		552	24.0	
Turnout		2,269	61.1	
Independent gain from Independent		Swing		

Islands District Council Election, 2011: Peng Chau & Hei Ling Chau
Party	Candidate	Votes	%	±%
Independent	On Hing-ying	1,177	48.06	
Independent	Ma Chun-tim	865	35.32	
Independent	Chan Chi-lin	407	16.62	
Majority		312	12.74	
Independent gain from Independent		Swing		

=== 2000s ===
Islands District Council Election, 2007: Peng Chau & Hei Ling Chau
Party	Candidate	Votes	%	±%
Independent	Ma Chun-tim	984	45.05	
Independent	On Hing-ying	880	40.29	
Independent	Chan Chi-lin	320	14.65	
Majority		104	4.76	
Independent gain from Independent		Swing		

Islands District Council Election, 2003: Peng Chau & Hei Ling Chau
Party	Candidate	Votes	%	±%
Independent	Wong Hoi-yue	762	36.60	
Independent	Ma Chun-tim	708	34.01	
Independent	Terry Lam Chun-kit	320	15.37	
Independent	Lee Man-on	292	14.02	
Majority		54	2.59	
Independent hold		Swing		

=== 1990s ===
Islands District Council Election, 1999: Peng Chau & Hei Ling Chau
Party	Candidate	Votes	%	±%
Independent	Wong Hoi-yue	1,029	47.12	
Independent	Ma Chun-tim	821	37.59	
Independent	Terry Lam Chun-kit	334	15.29	
Majority		208	9.53	
Independent gain from Independent		Swing		

Islands District Board Election, 1994: Peng Chau & Hei Ling Chau
Party	Candidate	Votes	%	±%
Independent	Ma Chun-tim	1,196	59.95	
Independent	Chan Chi-shing	799	40.05	
Majority		397	19.90	
Independent win (new seat)				
