= Cheung Kwai Estate =

Public housing estate in Cheung Chau, Hong Kong

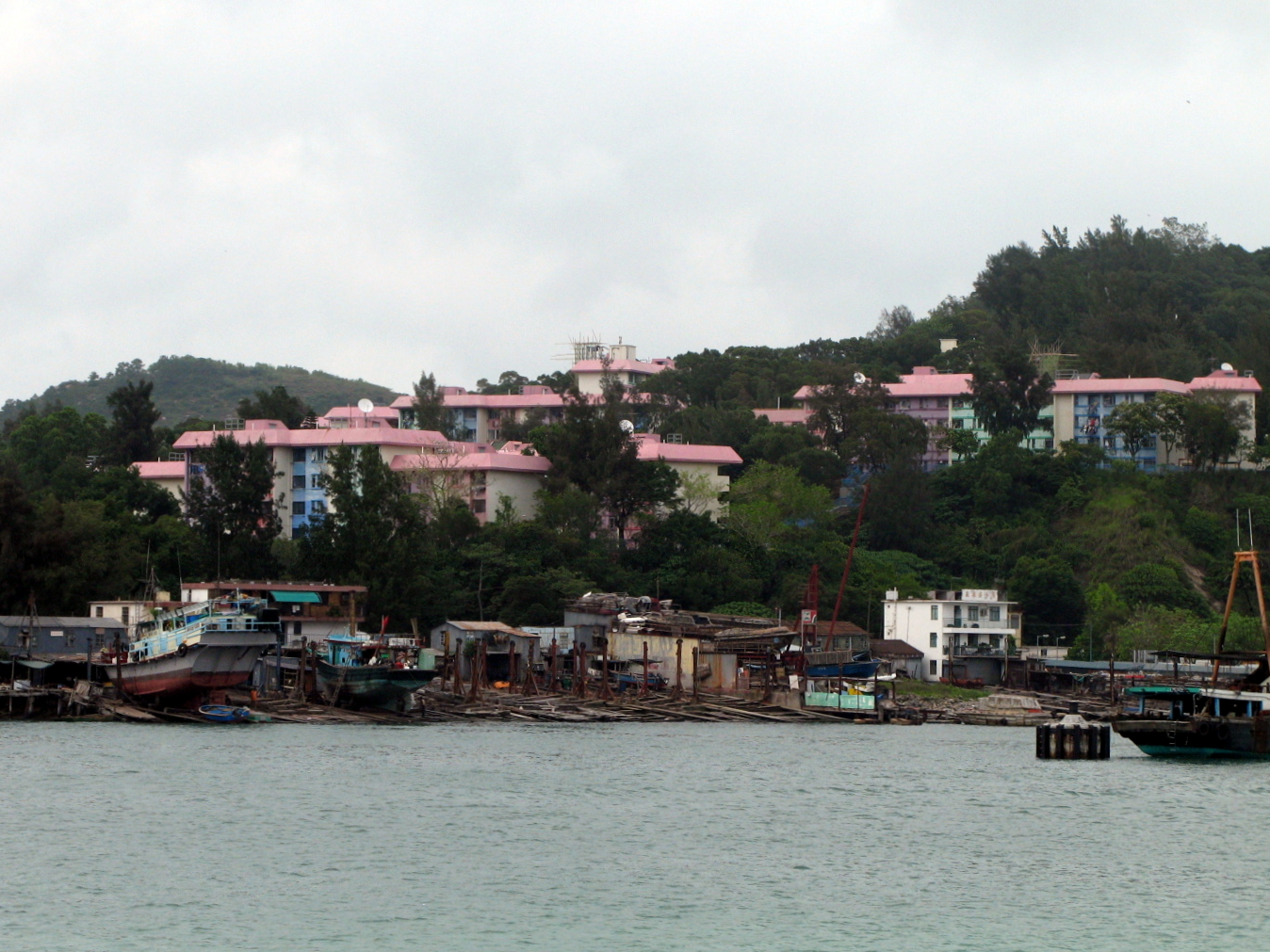
- Cheung Kwai Estate
- Interactive map of Cheung Kwai Estate

General information
- Location: 31 Cheung Kwai Road, Cheung Chau; New Territories, Hong Kong
- Coordinates: 22.2130°N 114.0252°E
- Status: Completed
- Category: Public rental housing
- No. of blocks: 18
- No. of units: 474

Construction
- Constructed: 1984; 42 years ago
- Authority: Hong Kong Housing Authority

Cheung Kwai Estate (Chinese: 長貴邨) is a public housing estate in Cheung Chau, New Territories, Hong Kong. It is the first public housing estate in Cheung Chau, consisting of 18 residential blocks and accommodating 1,800 people.

== Houses ==
Name	Chinese name	Building type	Completed
Cheung Chi House	長致樓	Non-standard	1984
Cheung Fung House	長豐樓	Non-standard	1984
Cheung Foon House	長歡樓	Non-standard	1984
Cheung Fat House	長發樓	Non-standard	1984
Cheung Fu House	長富樓	Non-standard	1984
Cheung Hing House	長興樓	Non-standard	1984
Cheung King House	長景樓	Non-standard	1984
Cheung Kwong House	長廣樓	Non-standard	1984
Cheung Lok House	長樂樓	Non-standard	1984
Cheung Nga House	長雅樓	Non-standard	1984
Cheung Shing House	長盛樓	Non-standard	1984
Cheung Shun House	長順樓	Non-standard	1984
Cheung Tak House	長德樓	Non-standard	1984
Cheung Wing House	長榮樓	Non-standard	1984
Cheung Wah House	長華樓	Non-standard	1984
Cheung Wong House	長旺樓	Non-standard	1984
Cheung Yick House	長益樓	Non-standard	1984
Cheung Yu House	長裕樓	Non-standard	1984

== Politics ==
Cheung Kwai Estate is located in Cheung Chau constituency of the Islands District Council. It was formerly represented by Leung Kwok-ho, who was elected in the 2019 elections until July 2021.

== See also ==
- Public housing estates on outlying islands of Hong Kong
