= Tai Lei =

Small island in Penguin Chair, Hong Kong

大利
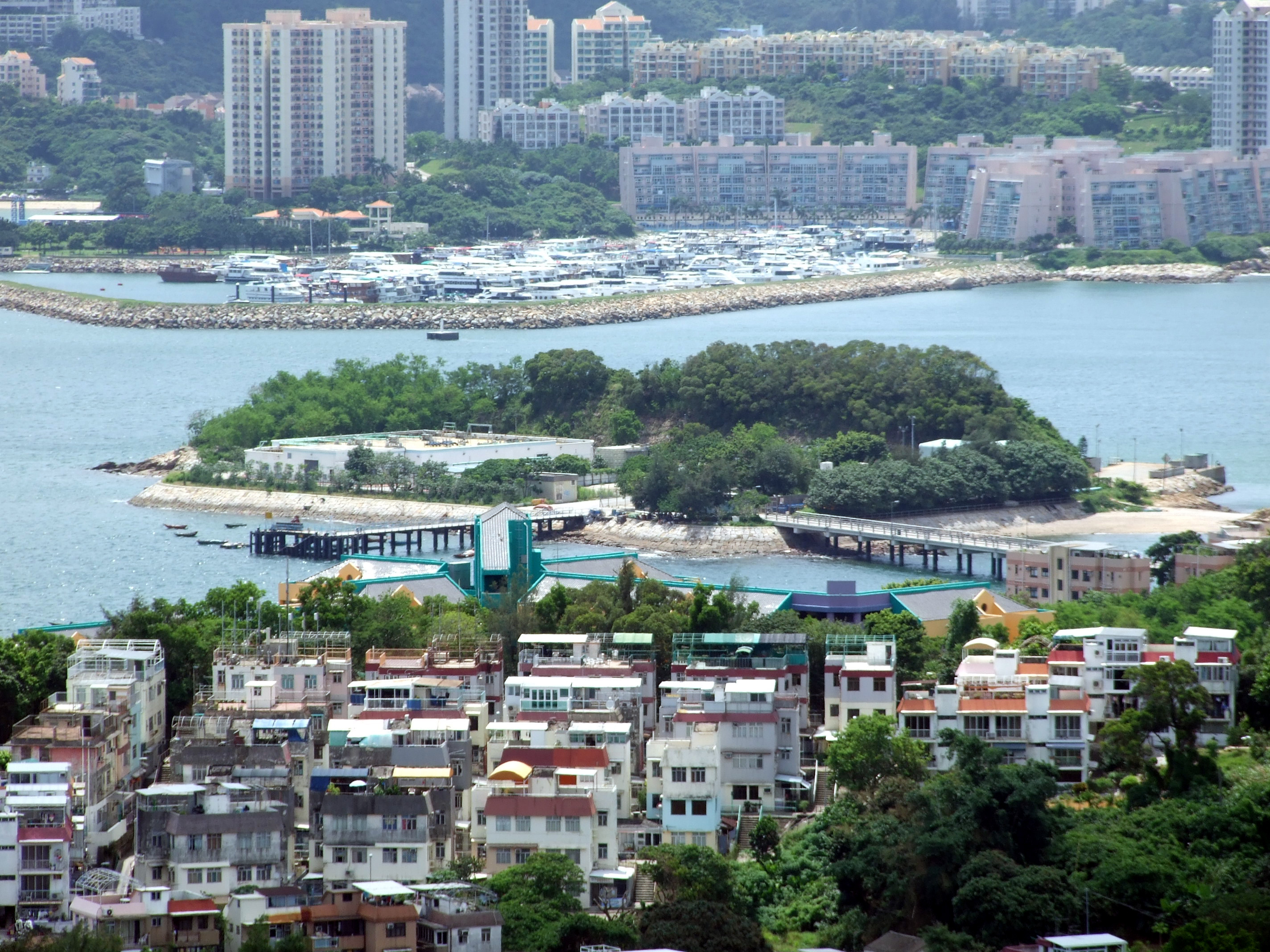
- Tai Lei with Peng Chau in the foreground and the Discovery Bay Marina in the background in July 2010.
- Interactive map of Tai Lei

Geography
- Coordinates: 22.2893°N 114.033°E

Administration
- Hong Kong
- District: Islands District

Demographics
- Population: 0

Tai Lei
- Traditional Chinese: 大利島
Transcriptions
Yue: Cantonese
- Yale Romanization: Daaih leih dóu
- Jyutping: Daai6 lei6 dou2

Tai Lei Chau
- Traditional Chinese: 大利洲
Transcriptions
Yue: Cantonese
- Yale Romanization: Daaih leih jāu
- Jyutping: Daai6 lei6 zau1

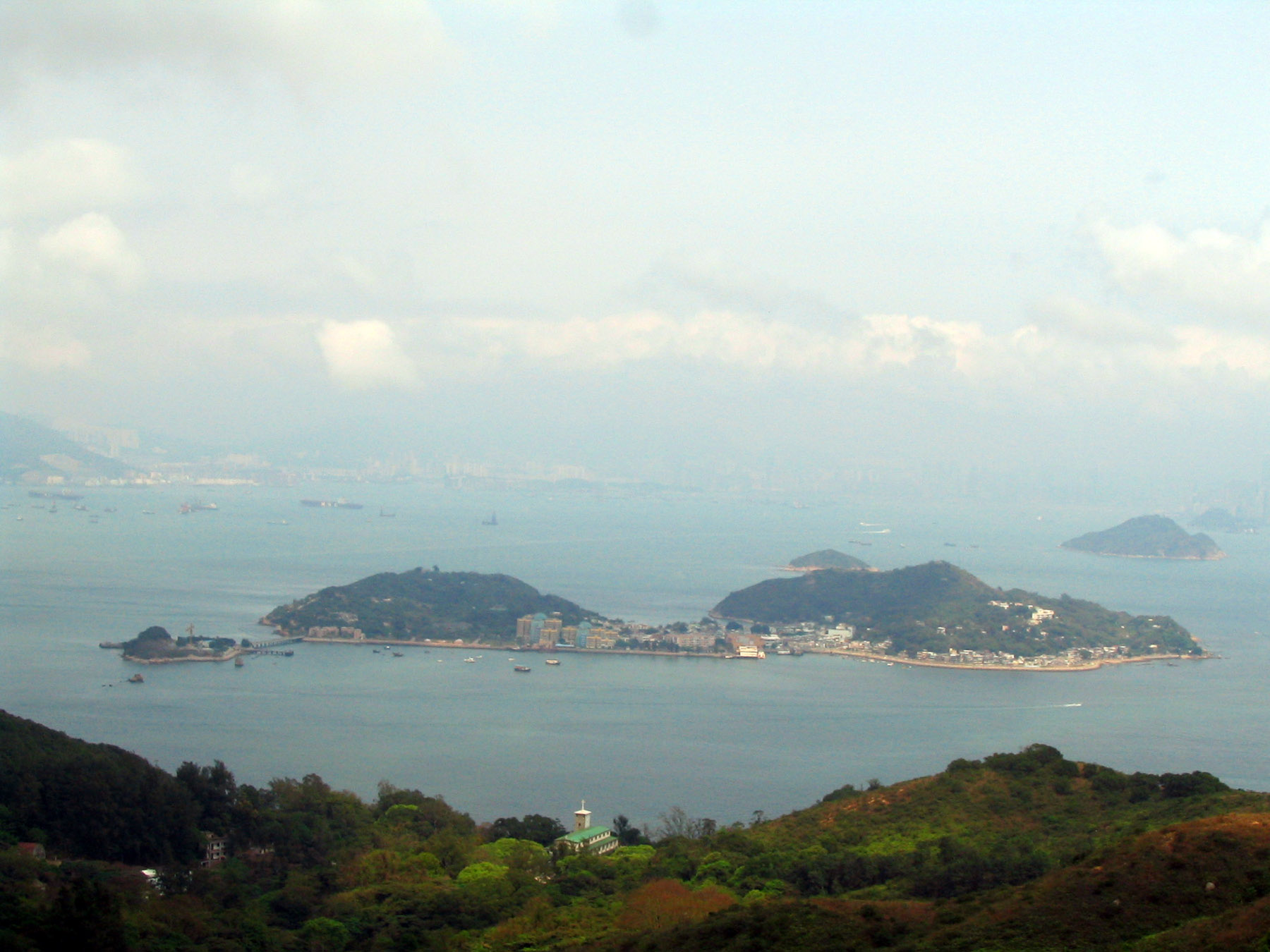
The island of Peng Chau with Tai Lei visible on the left hand side in April 2007.

Tai Lei, also referred to as Tai Lei Chau, is a small island located off the island of Peng Chau in Hong Kong. The island is connected to Peng Chau by a bridge. The bridge leading to the island is a popular fishing spot for residents of Peng Chau.

== Features ==
The island houses an electrical substation operated by China Light and Power. In 2010, renovation work conducted on the CLP facility on Tai Lei met resistance from local environmental organisations.

Part of the island is occupied by a refuse-sorting facility which handles much of the garbage generated by Peng Chau. The facility is connected to its own pier which allows material to be removed and taken to landfills by ship.

== Transportation ==
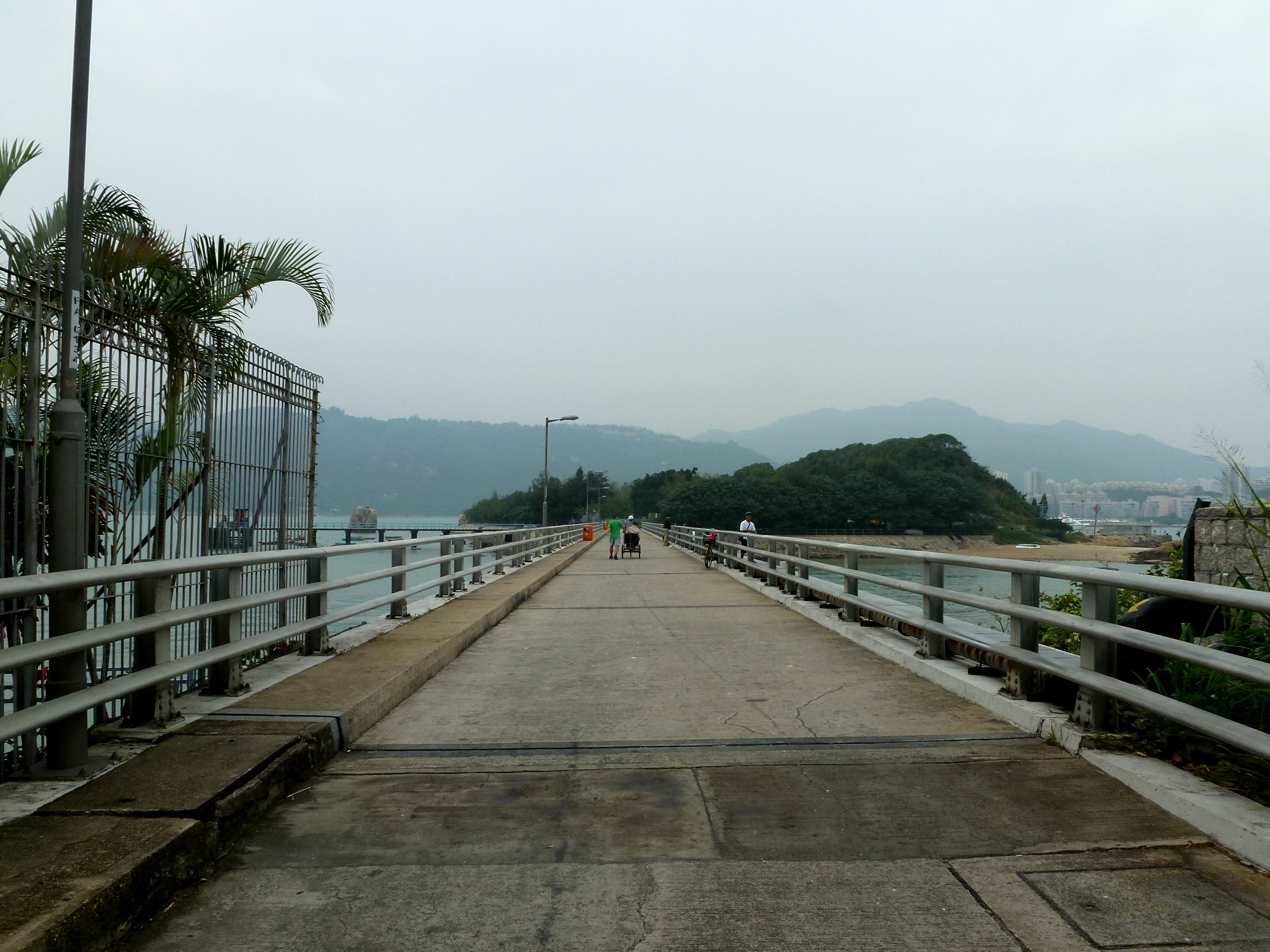
The Peng Lei Road bridge heading towards Tai Lei in November 2012

The island is connected to Peng Chau by the Peng Lei Road bridge.

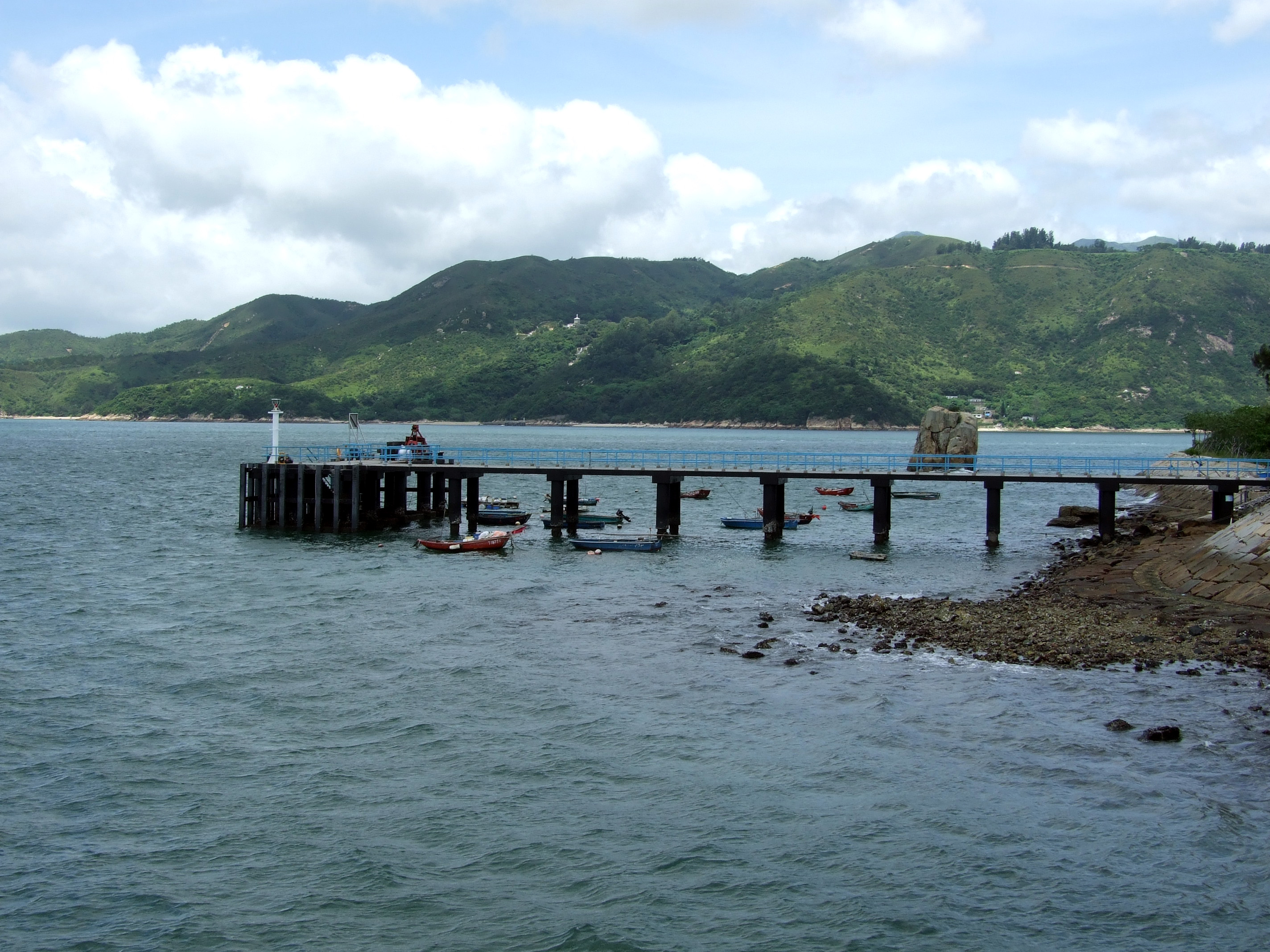
The Tai Lei public pier with Lantau Island visible in the background in July 2010.

The southern end of the island has a public pier which is operated and maintained by the Civil Engineering and Development Department of the government.

== See also ==
- List of islands and peninsulas of Hong Kong
