= Peng Chau Ferry Pier =

Ferry pier in Hong Kong

Peng Chau Ferry Pier 坪洲渡輪碼頭
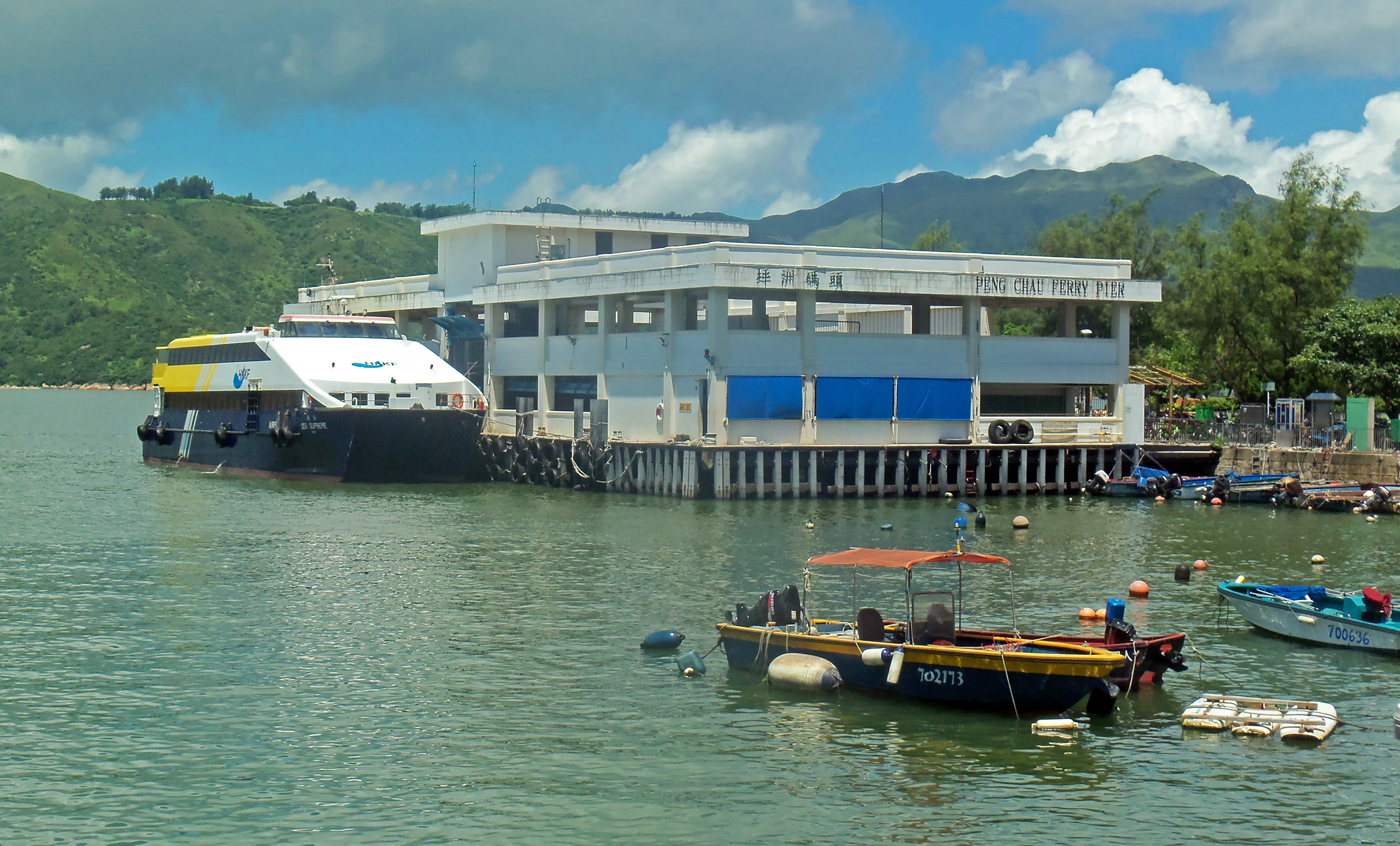
- Peng Chau Ferry Pier in August 2013
- Location: Lo Peng Street, Peng Chau
- Coordinates: 22°17′05″N 114°02′14″E
- Operator: Transport Department
- Maintained by: Civil Engineering and Development Department

Characteristics
- ID number: IP067

Peng Chau Ferry Pier
- Traditional Chinese: 坪洲渡輪碼頭
- Simplified Chinese: 坪洲渡轮码头
Transcriptions
Standard Mandarin
- Hanyu Pinyin: Píngzhōu Dùlún Mǎtóu
Yue: Cantonese
- Yale Romanization: Pìhng jāu douh lèuhn máh tàuh
- Jyutping: Ping4 zau1 dou6 leon4 maa5 tau4

Peng Chau Pier
- Traditional Chinese: 坪洲碼頭
Transcriptions
Yue: Cantonese
- Yale Romanization: Pìhng jāu máh tàuh
- Jyutping: Ping4 zau1 maa5 tau4

Peng Chau Ferry Pier or Peng Chau Pier is a ferry pier in Lo Peng Street, Peng Chau, New Territories, Hong Kong, next to Peng Chau Public Pier. Two ferry routes are operated at the pier. One is the service between Peng Chau and Central, operated by Hong Kong & Kowloon Ferry. The other is the "Inter-Island" service among Peng Chau, Lantau Island (Mui Wo, Chi Ma Wan) and Cheung Chau, operated by Sun Ferry.
