= Finger Hill =

Highest hill of Peng Chau, Hong Kong

- 手指山
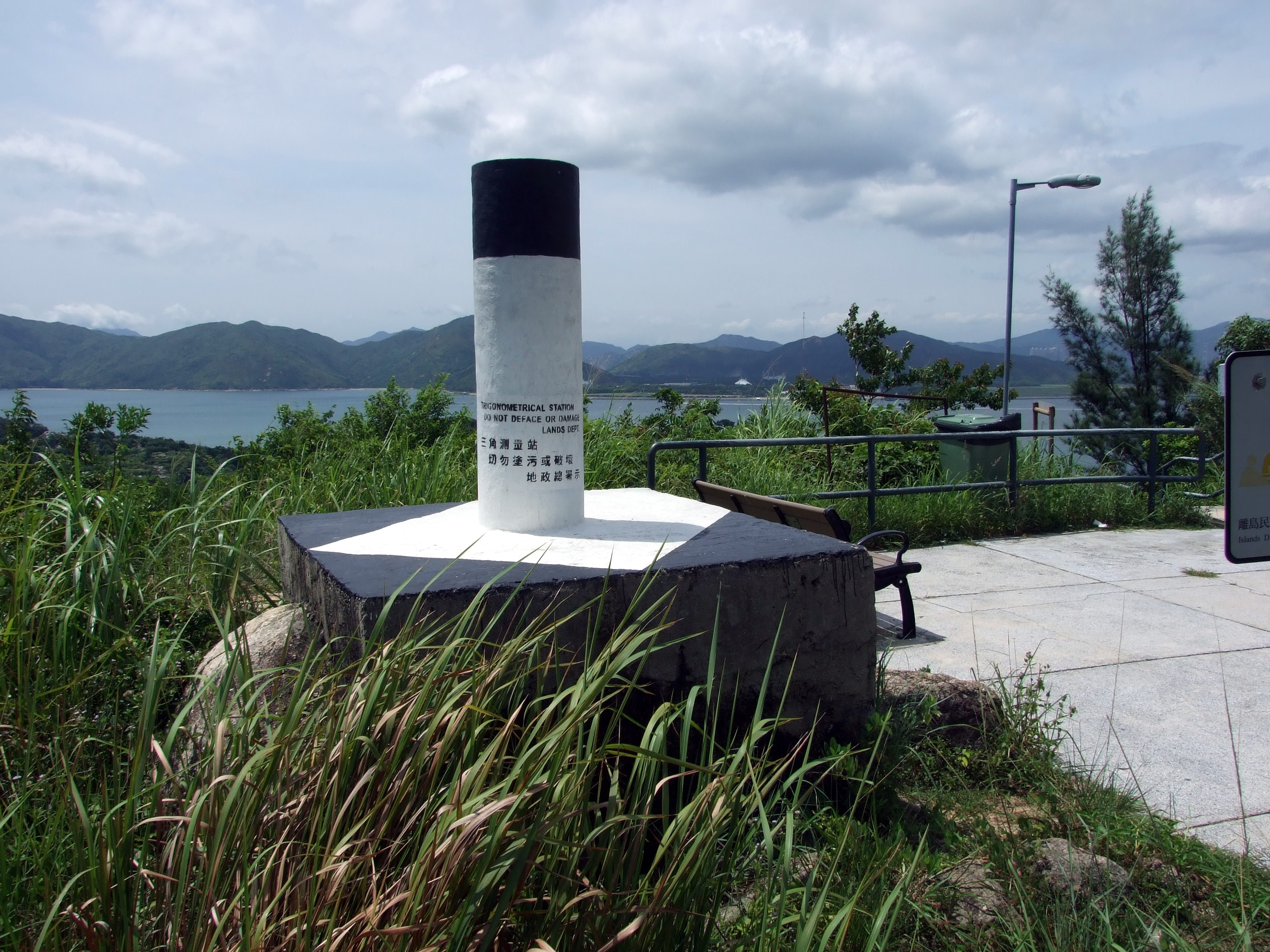
- The summit of Finger Hill

Highest point
- Elevation: 95 m (312 ft)
- Prominence: 95 m (312 ft)
- Coordinates: 22°17′01.57″N 114°02′38.08″E

Geography
- Location within Hong Kong
- Location: Peng Chau, Hong Kong

Finger Hill
- Traditional Chinese: 手指山
Transcriptions
Yue: Cantonese
- Yale Romanization: Sáu jí sāan
- Jyutping: Sau2 zi2 saan1

Finger Hill is the highest peak on the island of Peng Chau in Hong Kong, with a height of 95 metres (312 ft) above sea level.

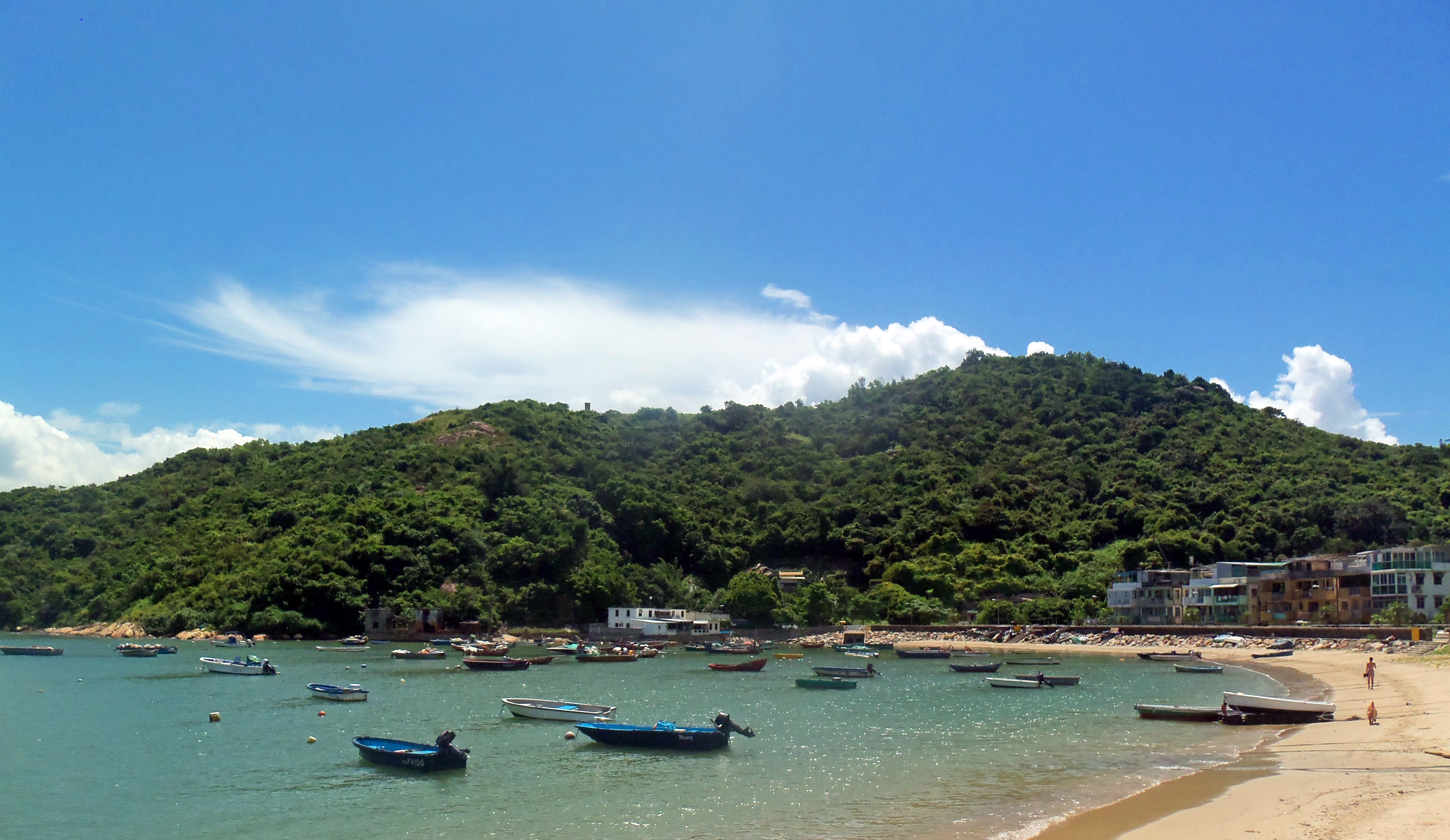
Finger Hill seen from Wing Tung Street

== Access ==
There is a family trail leading up to the summit. This is a gentle walk and can be done year-round.

== See also ==
- List of mountains, peaks and hills in Hong Kong
- Peng Chau
