= Nicholas Kao Se Tseien =

Hong Kong Trappist priest (1897–2007)

The Reverend Nicholas Kao Se Tseien OCSO
- 高師謙
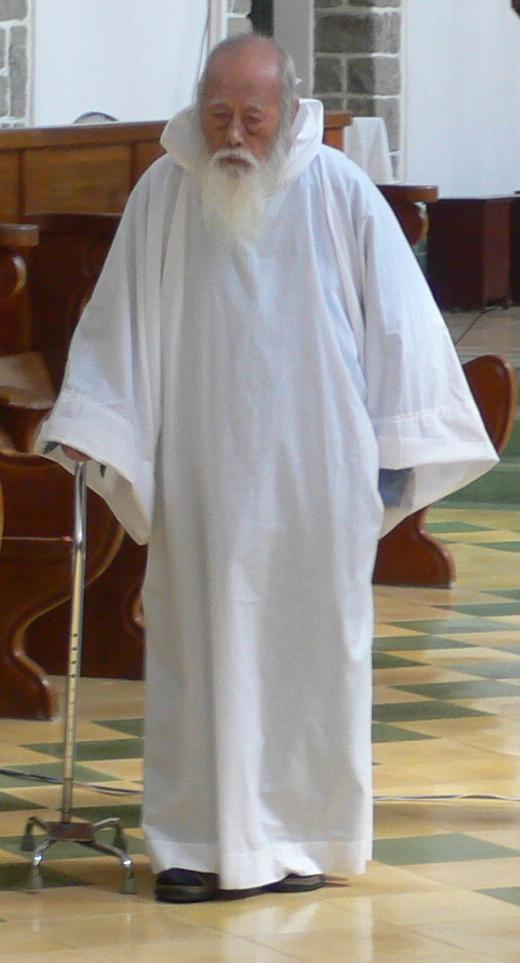
- Kao in 2007

Personal life
- Born: 15 January 1897 Fuzhou, Fujian, Qing China
- Died: 11 December 2007 (aged 110 years, 330 days) Lantau Island, Hong Kong
- Education: Amoy University
- Known for: Oldest living Catholic priest

Religious life
- Religion: Roman Catholic
- Order: Order of Cistercians of the Strict Observance
- Church: Cathedral of the Immaculate Conception; Our Lady of Joy Abbey

Chinese name
- Traditional Chinese: 高師謙
- Simplified Chinese: 高师谦
Transcriptions
Standard Mandarin
- Hanyu Pinyin: Gāo Shīqiān
Yue: Cantonese
- Yale Romanization: Gōu Sī-hīm
- Jyutping: Gou1 Si1him1
Southern Min
- Hokkien POJ: Kau Sai-khiam
- Tâi-lô: Kau Sai-khiam
Eastern Min
- Fuzhou BUC: Gŏ̤ Să-kiĕng

Nicholas Kao Se Tseien OCSO (traditional Chinese: 高師謙; simplified Chinese: 高师谦; Cantonese Yale: Gōu Sī-hīm; Jyutping: Gou1 Si1him1; pinyin: Gāo Shīqiān; 15 January 1897 – 11 December 2007), was a Chinese Trappist priest in Hong Kong who was the oldest-living Catholic priest and also the oldest person ever to have had a cataract operation, according to the Guinness Book of World Records.

== Biography ==
Born in Foochow, Fukien province (now Fuzhou, Fujian province), one of four brothers, Kao studied law at Amoy University (now Xiamen University) and later converted to Catholicism aged 18 while attending a school run by Spanish Dominican friars. He was trained as a teacher and studied law at night, but he ultimately decided to become a priest.

His life spanned parts of three centuries, two Emperors of China, and ten papacies. He stated that in 1912 he voted for Sun Yat Sen as China's president. His clerical life would bring him from China to Taiwan, Malaysia, and finally Hong Kong.

In 1972, he was at the Cathedral of the Immaculate Conception. He lived a cloistered life, but regularly shared advice for a healthy and long life. He gave visitors a list of "Healthy Seven Nos": no smoking; no anger; no alcohol; no overeating; constant exercise; constant prayer; no rudeness. He was devoted to the Blessed Virgin Mary throughout his life — he would say the Rosary many times each day, and built six shrines to her in Taiwan, mainland China, Malaysia and Hong Kong.

He stayed at Our Lady of Joy Abbey at Lantau Island for more than 30 years, where he died peacefully in his sleep on the morning of 11 December 2007, aged 110 years and 330 days. His body was buried in the Monastery's private graveyard.

== See also ==
- Aging
- Longevity
- Oldest people
