= Trappist Dairy =

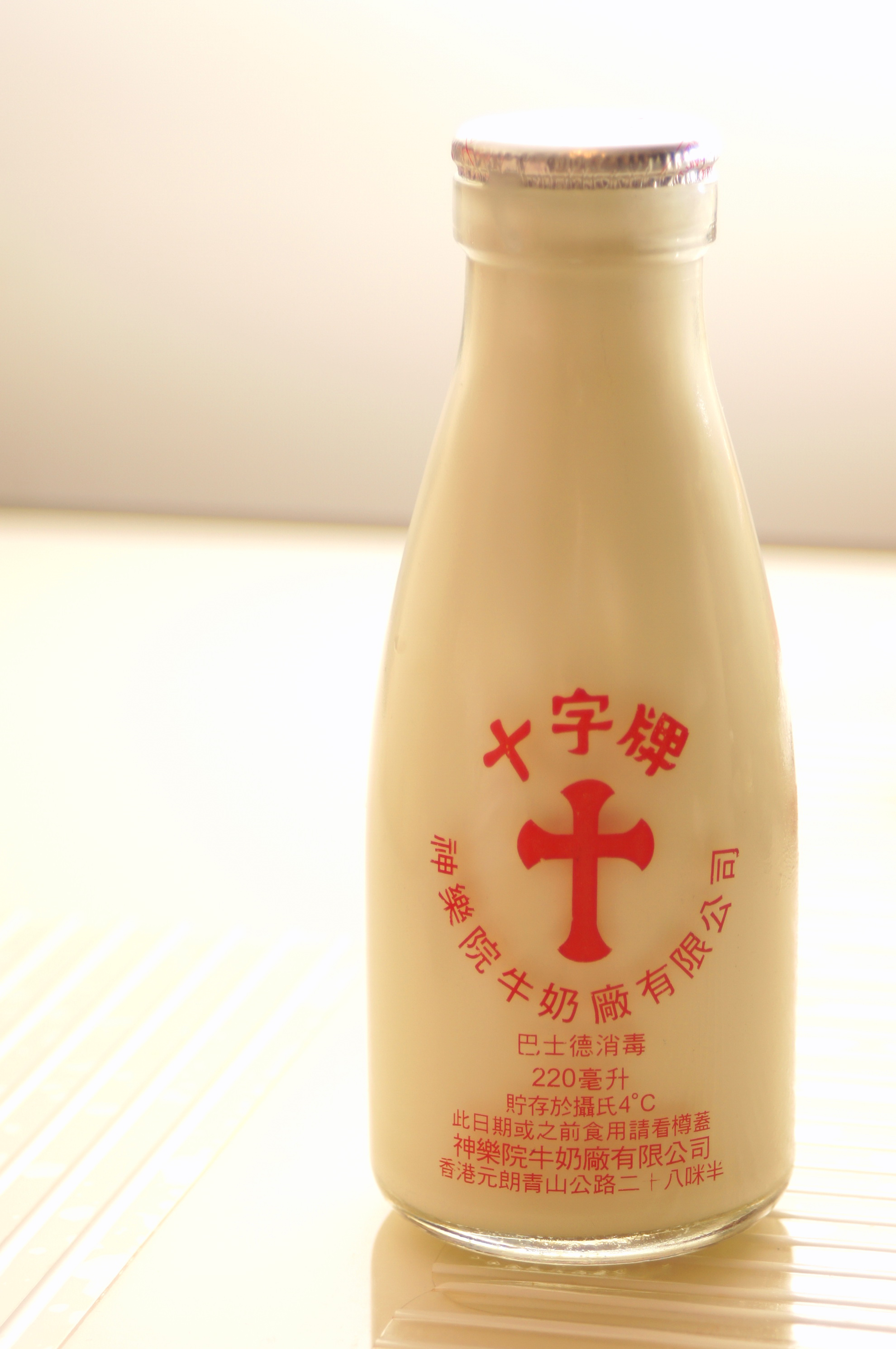
A bottle of Trappist Dairy milk

Trappist Dairy Limited is a small scale dairy producer in Hong Kong, with production based in Yuen Long.

It was founded in 1956 by Father Jen Stanislus of the Trappist Haven Monastery, on Lantau Island, and the dairy was initially operated by Trappist Haven of Tai Shui Hang.

The dairy processing operations are managed by Lark International Dairy Holdings Limited from late of 1980s.

Trappist milk products are sold in the traditional glass bottles as well as cardboard cartons.

In 2015, batches of Trappist Dairy milk were temporarily withdrawn from sale due to safety tests detecting “excessive bacteria”.

== See also ==
- Trappist Haven Monastery
- Dairy Farm
- Kowloon Dairy
