= Our Lady of Joy Abbey =

Monastery in Lantau, Hong Kong

Coordinates: 22.2801°N 114.0184°E

- 聖母神樂院
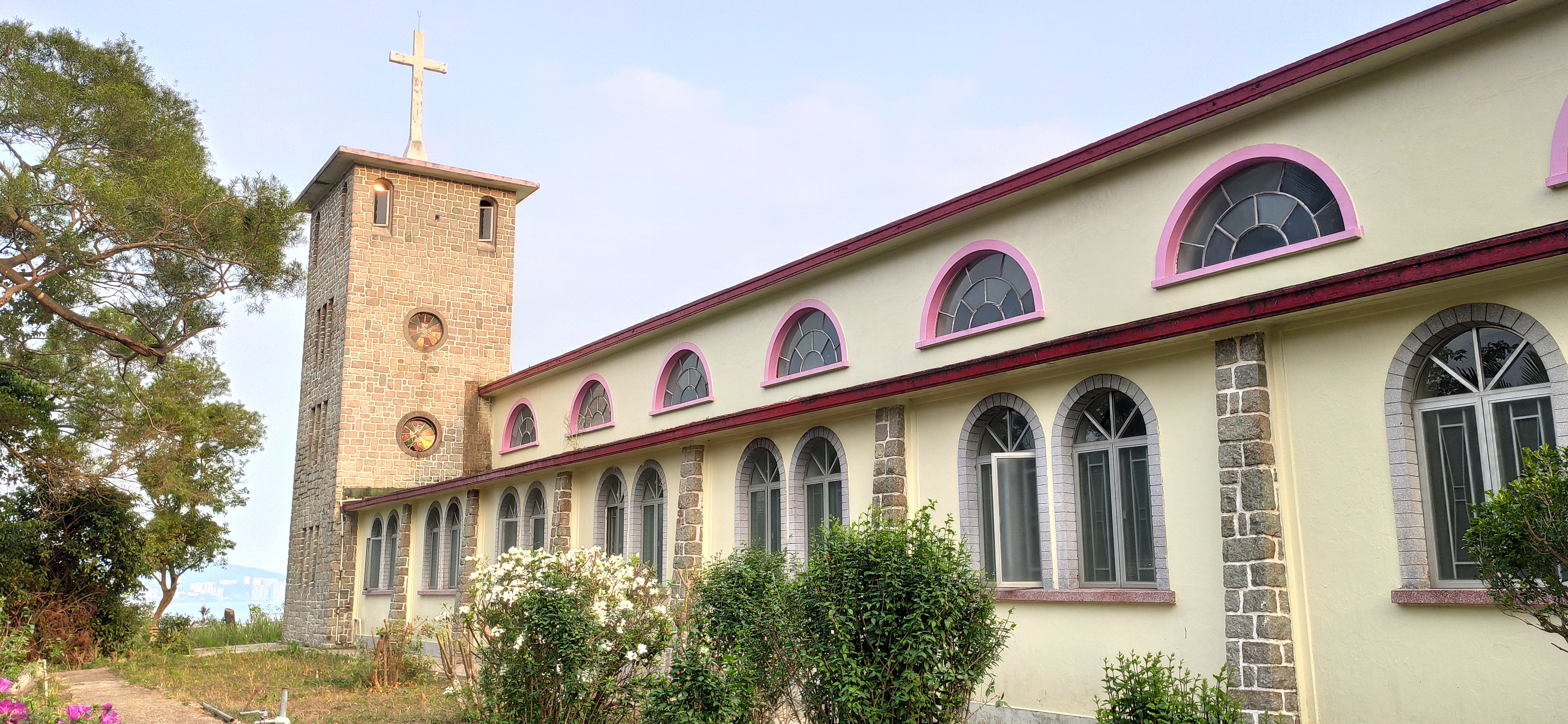
- The abbey in 2020
- Interactive map of Our Lady of Joy Abbey

Monastery information
- Order: Trappists
- Established: 19 February 1956
- Dedication: Virgin Mary
- Diocese: Hong Kong

Site
- Location: Tai Shui Hang, Hong Kong

Our Lady of Joy Abbey
- Traditional Chinese: 聖母神樂院
- Simplified Chinese: 圣母神乐院
- Cantonese Yale: Sing móuh sáhn lohk yún
Transcriptions
Standard Mandarin
- Hanyu Pinyin: Shèngmǔ Shénlèyuàn
Yue: Cantonese
- Yale Romanization: Sing móuh sáhn lohk yún
- Jyutping: Sing3 mou5 san4 lok6 jyun2

Trappist Haven Monastery
- Traditional Chinese: 熙篤會神樂院
- Simplified Chinese: 熙笃会神乐院
- Cantonese Yale: Hēi dūk wúih sàhn lohk yún
Transcriptions
Standard Mandarin
- Hanyu Pinyin: Xīdǔhuì Shénlèyuàn
Yue: Cantonese
- Yale Romanization: Hēi dūk wúih sàhn lohk yún
- Jyutping: Hei1 duk1 wui5 san4 lok6 jyun2

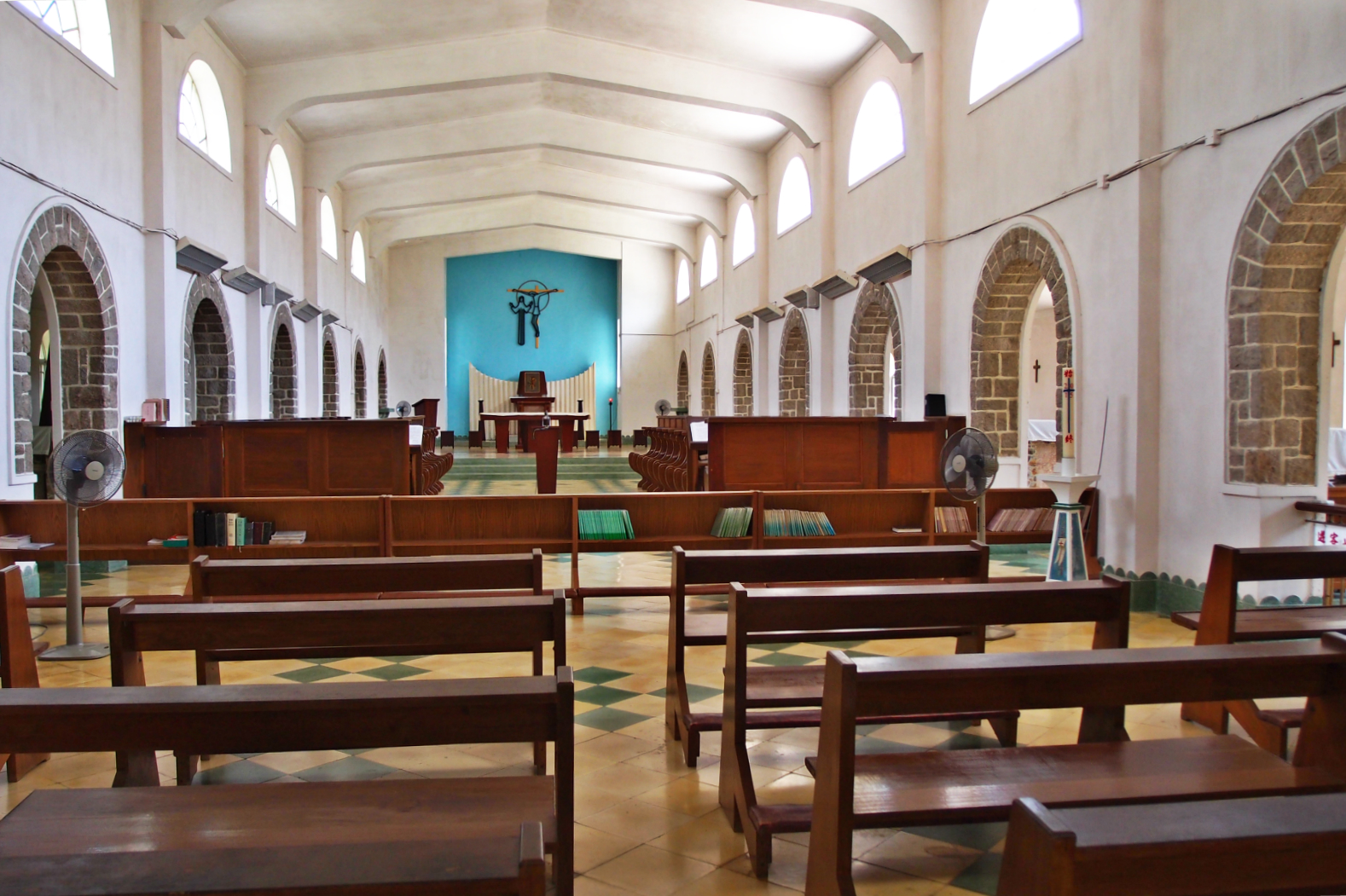
Interior of the abbey church

The Our Lady of Joy Abbey is a monastery at Tai Shui Hang (大水坑), on Lantau Island in the New Territories, Hong Kong. It is home to a number of Roman Catholic monks of the Cistercian Order of the Strict Observance, or Trappists. It was originally named "Trappist Haven Monastery", and founded by refugee monks from Our Lady of Consolation Abbey and Our Lady of Joy Abbey.

== History ==
=== Hopeh (Hebei) ===
During the Chinese Communist Revolution and Chinese Civil War, the Trappist monks from Our Lady of Consolation Abbey and Our Lady of Joy Abbey became refugees. Our Lady of Consolation had been located in Yangchiaping, Hsüanhwa, Chahar (now Xuanhua within Zhangjiakou, Hebei), but had been destroyed in 1947 by the Chinese Communist Party. Our Lady of Joy Abbey was located in Chengting, Hopeh (now Zhengding, Hebei), and its monks had fled after thirty-three of them were murdered.

=== Szechwan (Sichuan) ===
In 1947, the abbey was transferred to Hsin-tu county near Chengtu, Szechwan (now Xindu within Chengdu, Sichuan) in western China. Father Paulin Li and forty monks reached their destination via Shanghai. They remained in Szechwan for two years, until the end of 1949, when the communist invasion reached there. By which time, north and central China had already been taken over by the communists; it became evident that the monastic community had to move again. On Christmas Day 1949, the communists occupied the Chengtu Monastery and its surrounding land. A couple of the young monks were severely beaten, three were martyred after brutal torture, namely, Vincent Shi, Albert Wei, and Father You. Father Paulin Li managed to transfer ten of the monks to Canada, including nine Chinese nationals and one Belgian.

=== Hong Kong ===
The rest of these monks were dispersed across China until the government of Hong Kong and Bishop Enrico Valtorta offered to let them found a monastery on Lantau Island. They moved there in 1951 and began work on the monastery, which was officially opened on 19 February 1956, under British colonial rule until it was handed over back to China in 1997.

It adopted its official name "Our Lady of Joy Abbey" on 15 January 2000.

== Monastic Community ==
- Dom. Paul Kao, Abbot
- Rev. William Young, Sub-Prior & Treasurer
- Rev. Giles Chong
- Rev. Clement Kong
- Rev. Benedict Chao
- Rev. Raphael Kang
- Rev. Andrew Qin
- Rev. Bruno Sie
- Rev. Deacon Paul Li
- Bro. Peter Gao
- Bro. Bosco Mo
- Bro. James Truong
- Bro. Simon Tsui
- Bro. Antonius Yiu

Simple Vows: 1

Novice: 1

== Past superiors ==
=== Titular priors ===
- Rev. Paulinus Lee (31 February 1941 – 3 February 1965)
- Rev. Simeon Chang (21 May 1965 – 17 June 1974)
- Rev. Benedict Chao (31 July 1974 – 4 August 1992)

=== Superiors ad nutum ===
- Rev. Benedict Chao (4 August 1992 — 11 July 1998)
- Rev. Mauru Pei (11 July 1998 – 5 September 1999)
- Rev. Anastasius Li (27 July 2003 – 7 November 2004)

=== Abbots ===
- Dom. Clement Kong (5 September 1999 — 1 July 2003)
- Dom. Anastasius Li (7 November 2004 – 7 November 2010)
- Dom. Paul Kao (2016 – Present)

== Notable monks ==
- Rev. Nicholas Kao Se Tseien
- Rev. Benedict Chao, oldest monk in the world at the time of his death in 2026

== Consumer products ==
The monastery is known for producing the Trappist milk at its dairy farm (十字牌牛奶 or 神樂園牛奶 in Cantonese). The factory, however, is now located in Tai Sang Wai, at 28½ miles, Castle Peak Road – Tam Mei, Yuen Long District.

Around the monastery some of the last free roaming feral cattle in Hong Kong can be seen, being the descendants of the cattle released after the closure of the dairy farm.

== Access ==
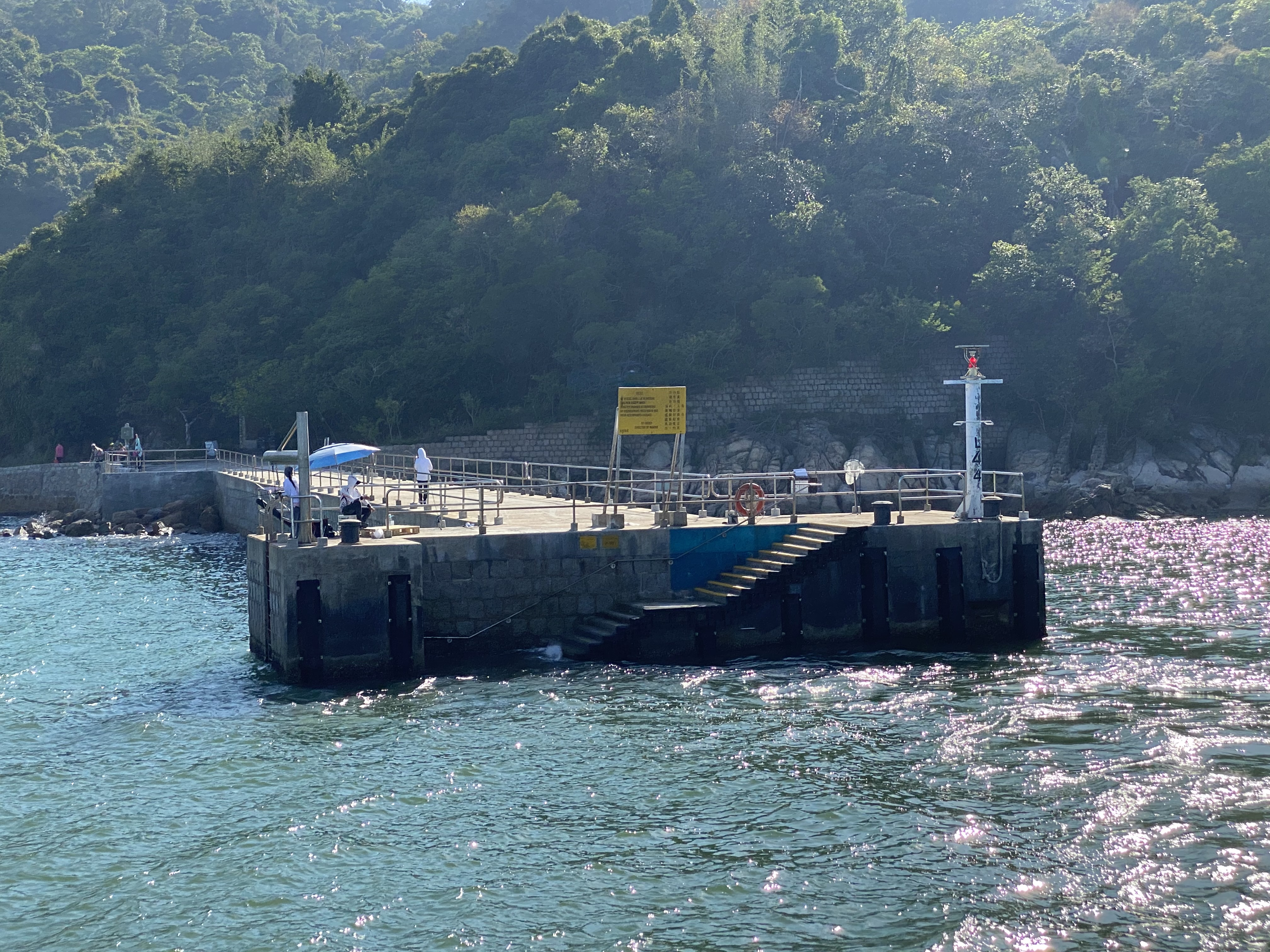
Tai Shui Hang Pier (大水坑碼頭) aka. Trappist Monastery Pier

The monastery is located on a scenic hiking trail leading from Discovery Bay via Nim Shue Wan to Mui Wo. It provides a resting point halfway through the hike.

The monastery can also be accessed by kai-to ferry from Peng Chau or from Discovery Bay (Nim Shue Wan).

== See also ==
- Christianity in Hebei
- Catholic Church in Sichuan
- Catholic Church in Hong Kong
- Trappist Dairy
