= Sing Lei Hap Gei Lime Kiln Factory =

Coordinates: 22.280613°N 114.040955°E

- 坪洲勝利合記石灰窰廠遺址
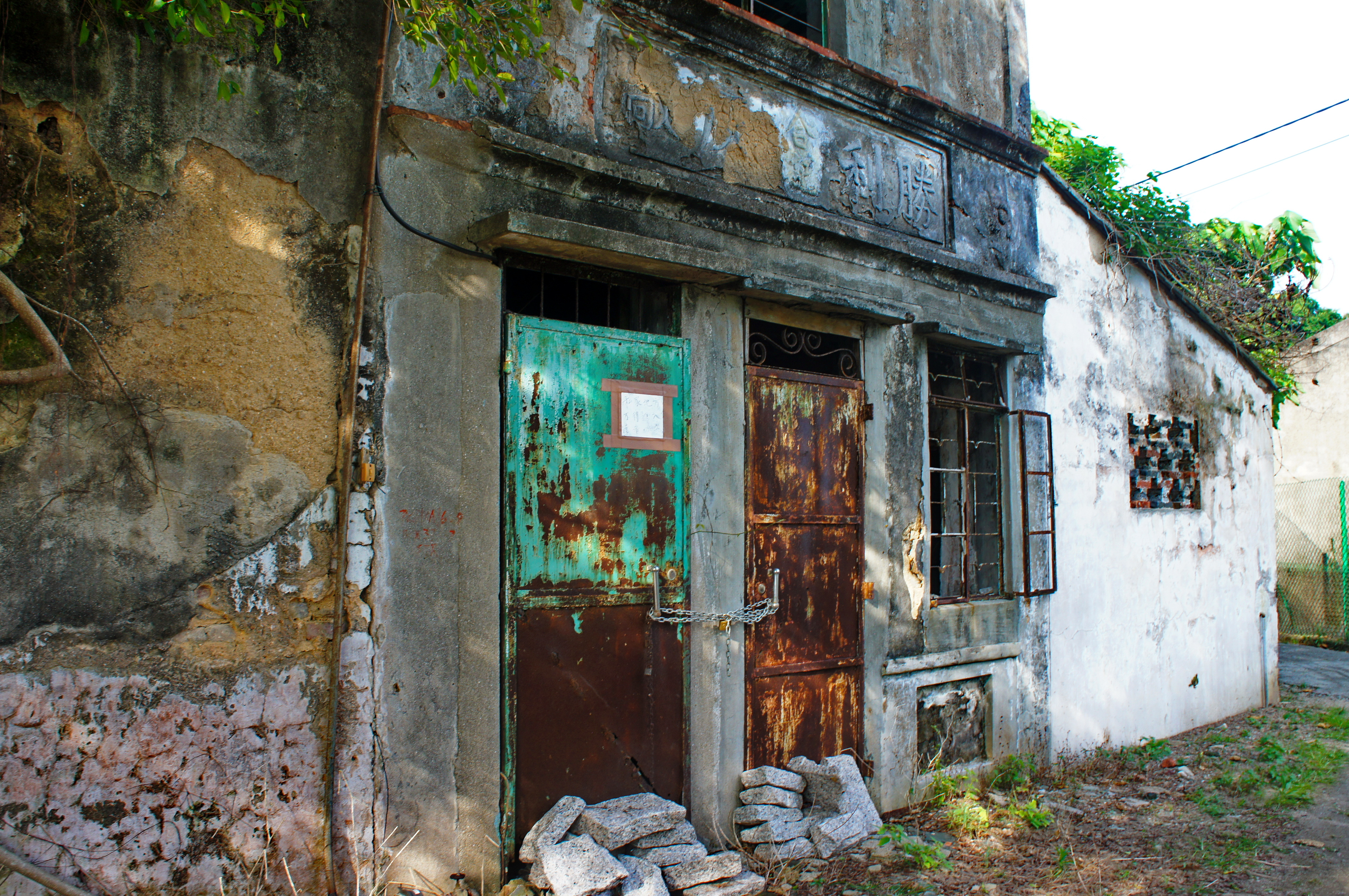
- Old site of Shing Lei Lime Kiln Factory, Peng Chau, Hong Kong.
- Interactive map of the Sing Lei Hap Gei Lime Kiln Factory area

General information
- Status: Abandoned
- Type: Factory
- Location: 2 Nam Wan, Shan Teng Tsuen, Peng Chau, Hong Kong
- Owner: Privately held

Sing Lei Hap Gei Lime Kiln Factory
- Traditional Chinese: 坪洲勝利合記石灰窰廠遺址
- Simplified Chinese: 坪洲胜利合记石灰窑厂遗址
Transcriptions
Standard Mandarin
- Hanyu Pinyin: Píngzhōu Shènglìhéjì Shíhuī Yáochǎng Yízhǐ
Yue: Cantonese
- Yale Romanization: Pìhng jāu sing leih hahp gei sehk fūi yìuh chóng wàih jí
- Jyutping: Ping4 zau1 sing3 lei6 hap6 gei3 sek6 fui1 jiu4 cong2 wai4 zi2

The Sing Lei Hap Gei Lime Kiln Factory is an abandoned lime production facility on the island of Peng Chau in Hong Kong.

== History ==
The factory, originally consisting of two buildings, was established in the 19th century and was one of 11 lime kilns present on the island of Peng Chau. The current building was constructed during the 1920s. The lime was produced by burning oyster shells, clam shells, and coral. Lime from the kiln was used in a variety of industries including construction and paper-making. The development of more modern materials led to the decline in business for the kilns in the 1950s.

The kiln was able to maintain operation, even during the Japanese occupation of Hong Kong during the Second World War. However, as lime became an obsolete material during the 1950s, the factory was finally closed during the 1970s.

== Heritage status ==
The building was submitted to the Antiquities Advisory Board for consideration as a heritage building under the Antiquities and Monuments Ordinance on 19 March 2009, which was granted on 20 Sept 2010. This was largely done to preserve the building, which was beginning to fall into dilapidation, by opening up avenues of potential funding to cover the cost of the upkeep of the building for the owner under the Financial Assistance for Maintenance Scheme.

== See also ==
- Heritage conservation in Hong Kong
