= Nim Shue Wan =

Bay in Hong Kong

Coordinates: 22.288958°N 114.022393°E

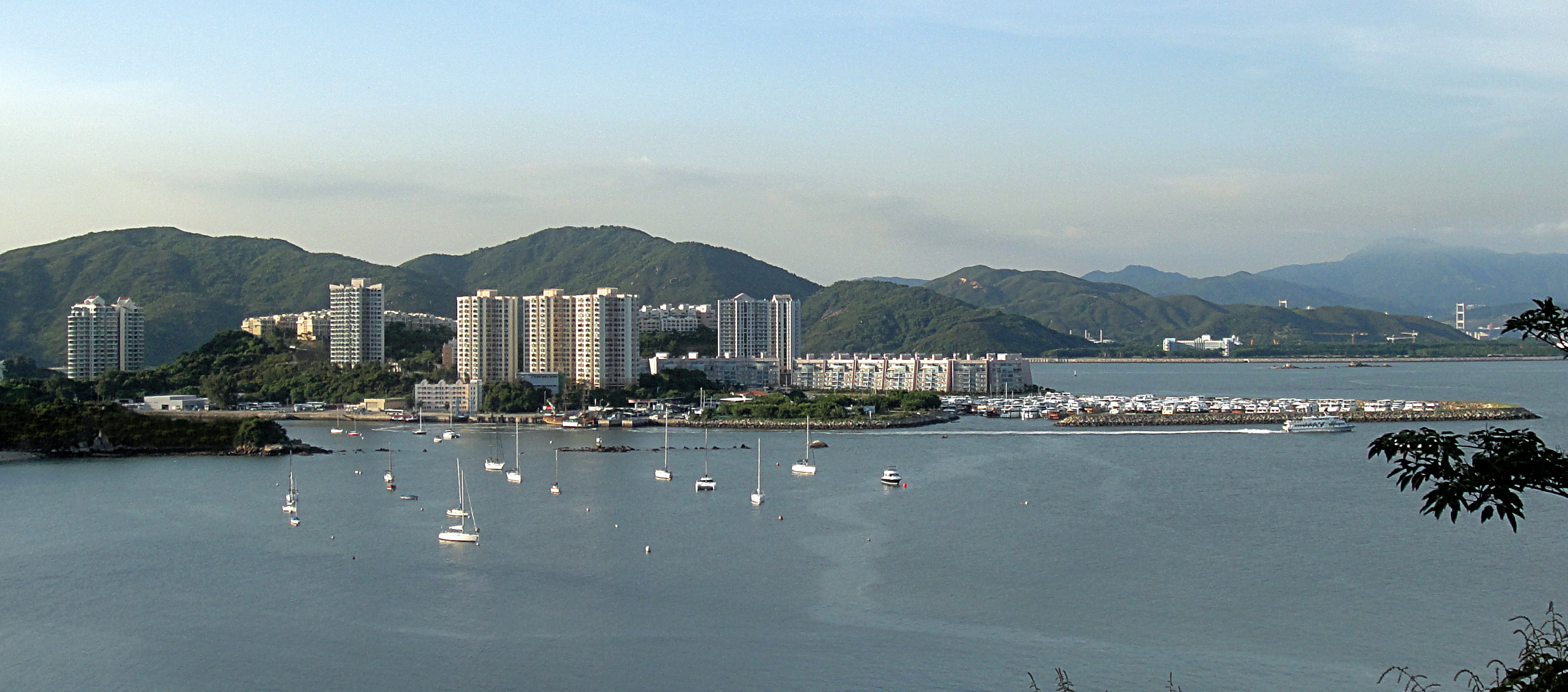
- View of Discovery Bay and Discovery Bay Marina across Nim Shue Wan
- Traditional Chinese: 稔樹灣
- Simplified Chinese: 稔树湾
Transcriptions
Standard Mandarin
- Hanyu Pinyin: Rěnshùwān
Yue: Cantonese
- Yale Romanization: Náhm syuh wāan
- Jyutping: Nam5 syu6 waan1

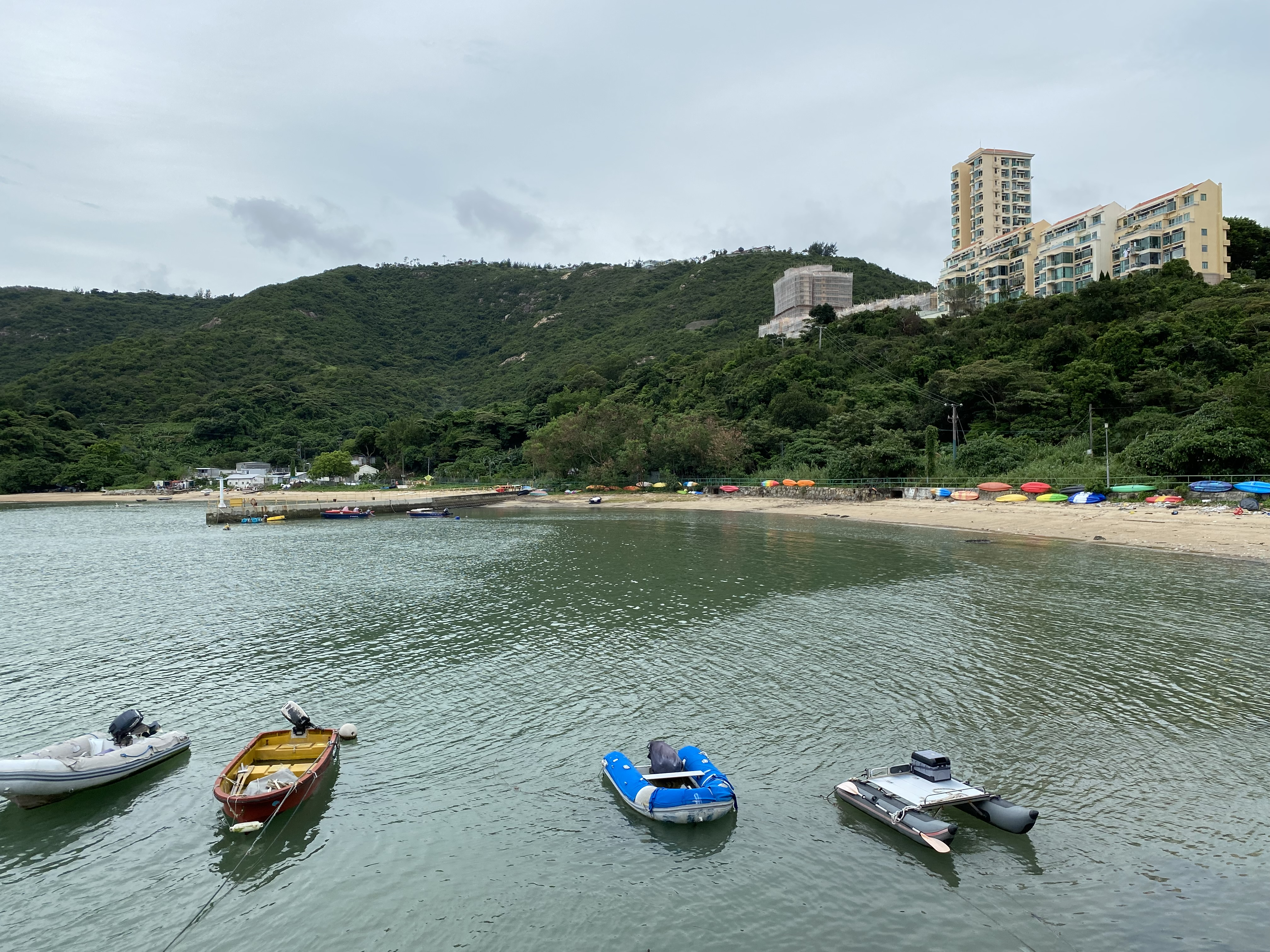
Distant view of Nim Shue Wan Village (centre left) and beach.

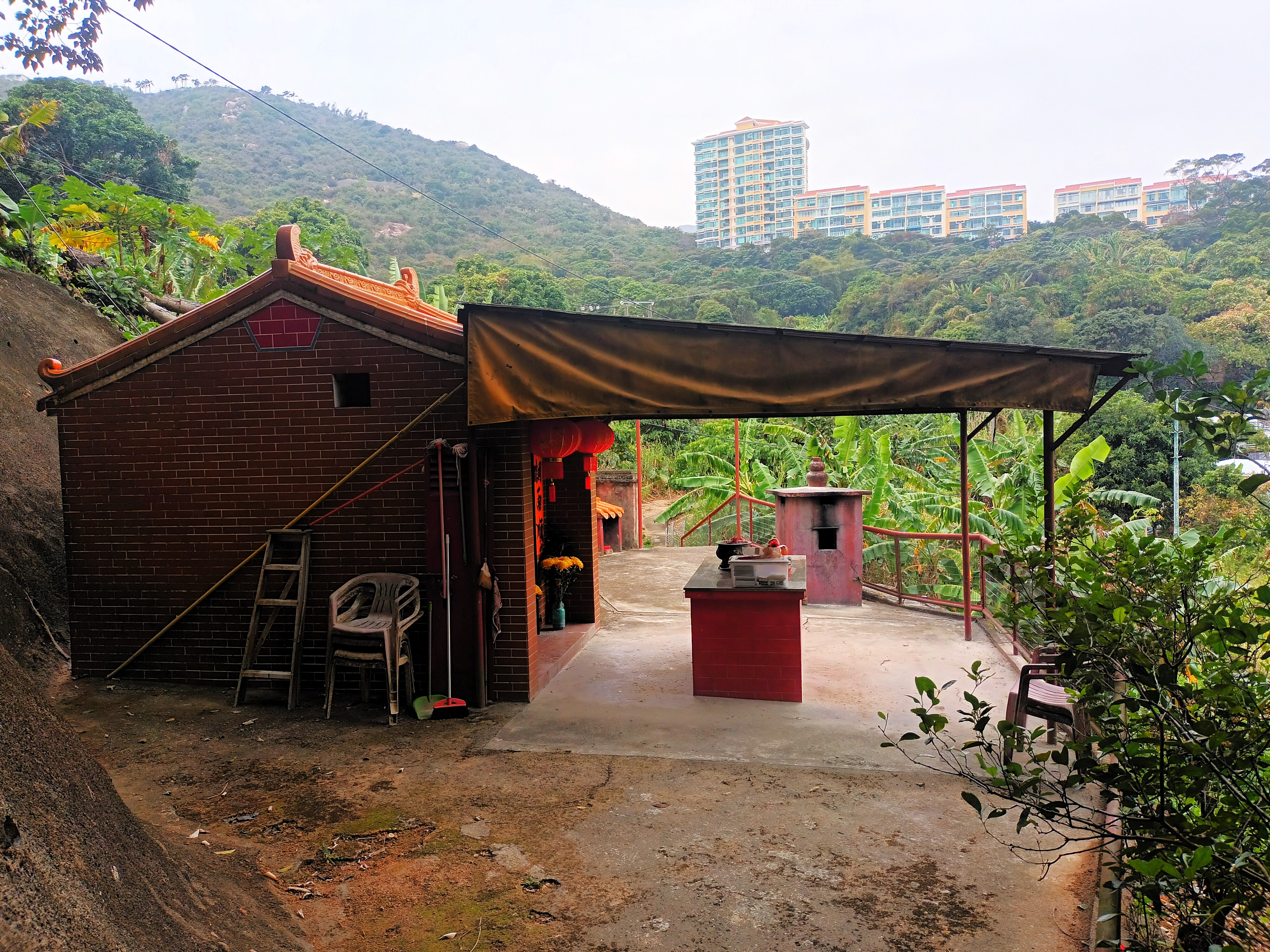
Tin Hau Temple at Nim Shue Wan.

Nim Shue Wan is the south facing bay on the south side of Discovery Bay, Lantau Island, Hong Kong. Nim Shue Wan Village (稔樹灣村) was a small fishing village but now has become a dormitory village for workers at nearby Discovery Bay.

== History ==
Nim Shue Wan Village was a small Hakka village in the 19th century, that became deserted towards the end of the century, after it was destroyed by a typhoon that was followed by a disease. In the 1950s, James W. Hayes reported that Nim Shue Wan Village, once a prosperous village, had been uninhabited for 20–30 years until it was settled again by Hakka newcomers in the 1940s. These - at the time - recent inhabitants were farming vegetables and breeding pigs. In 1955, Austin Coates reported a population of 42. In 1961, the village population reached about 200 people of 52 families in 1961. It later grew to 500 people.

== Boats ==
The bay provides a safe anchorage for small fishing boats and pleasure craft. An even safer haven is provided by the Discovery Bay Marina Club which has an established marina, now occupied by a large number of live-aboard residents who rarely set sail from their berths.

== Temple ==
There is a Tin Hau Temple in Nim Shue Wan, which was built in 1920. Villagers moved the statue of the goddess to Peng Chau during the Japanese occupation of Hong Kong. The temple was rebuilt in 1972 and in 2003.

== Education ==
Nim Shue Wan is in Primary One Admission (POA) School Net 99, which contains two aided schools: SKH Wei Lun Primary School in Discovery Bay and Holy Family School in Peng Chau; no government primary schools are in this net.

== Transportation ==
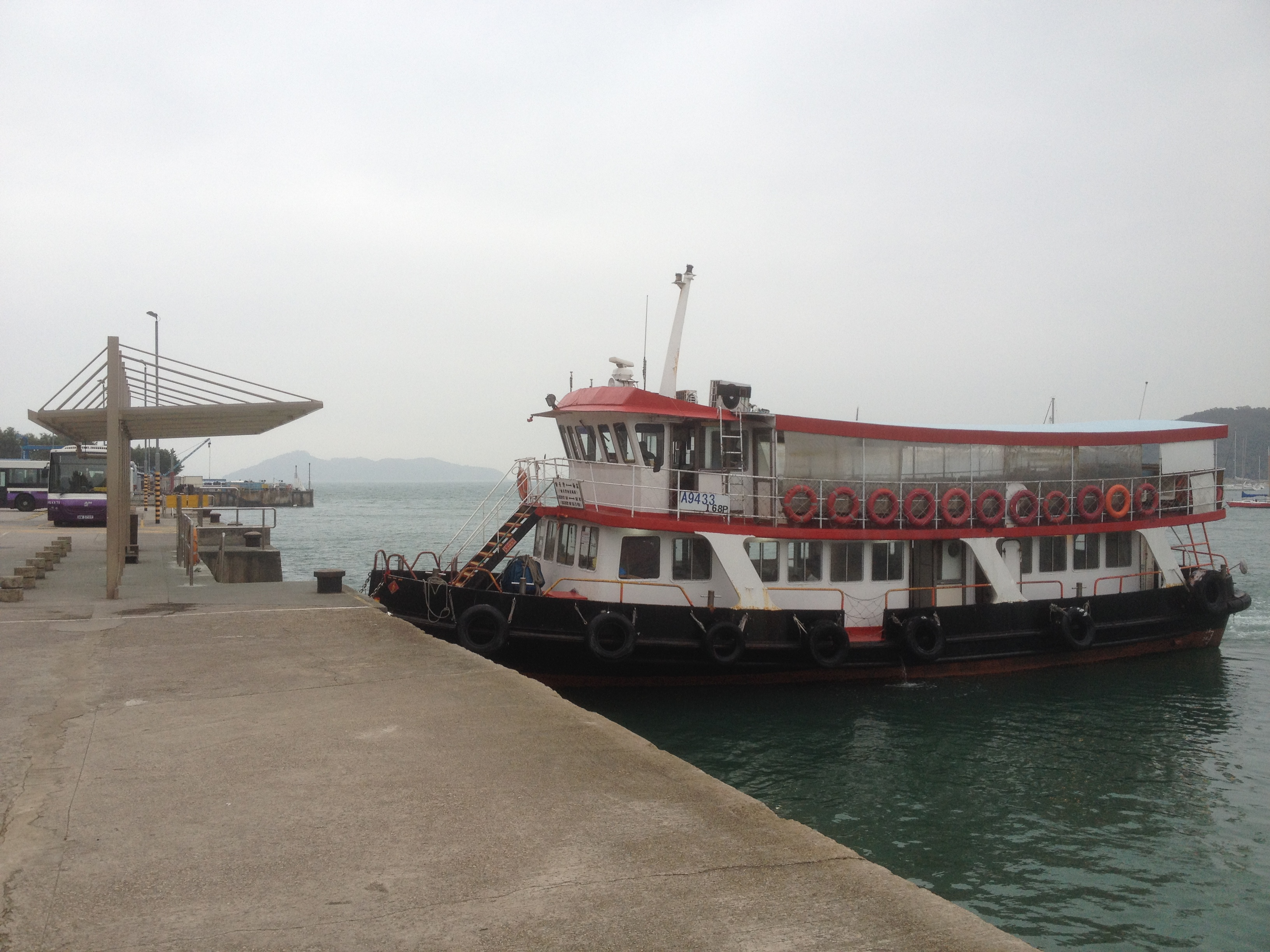
Kai-to of Peng Chau Kaito in Nim Shue Wan.

The jetty pier at Nim Shue Wan was once the main freight pier serving Discovery Bay before the Discovery Bay road tunnel linking to the Lantau Link opened in 2000. The pier has a vehicular ferry ramp and until 2006 also had building waste discharge ramps. There is also a marine refuelling bowser for commercial and public customers.

Today the pier is still the main passenger kai-to (small ferry) pick up point for services to neighbouring islands and other locations on Lantau. Peng Chau Kaito operates a scheduled service between Nim Shue Wan, Peng Chau and Mui Wo, while Tsui Wah Ferry operates a scheduled service between Peng Chau, Nim Shue Wan and Tai Shui Hang Pier near Our Lady of Joy Abbey (Trappist Haven Monastery).
