= Josephine Tsang =

Hong Kong politician (1960–2022)

Josephine Tsang Sau-ho
- 曾秀好

Member of the Islands District Council
- In office September 2014 – 1 May 2022
- Preceded by: ON Hing-ying
- Constituency: Peng Chau and Hei Ling Chau

Personal details
- Born: 1960 Hong Kong
- Died: May 1, 2022 (aged 61–62) Hong Kong
- Party: Independent
- Occupation: Security manager

Josephine Tsang
- Traditional Chinese: 曾秀好
Transcriptions
Yue: Cantonese
- Yale Romanization: Jāng Sau-hóu
- Jyutping: Zang^{1} Sau^{3}-hou^{2}

Josephine Tsang Sau-ho (Chinese: 曾秀好; 1960 – 1 May 2022) was an elected member of the Hong Kong District Council (Islands District), representing the Peng Chau and Hei Ling Chau constituency. Tsang first ran for the District Council after the then incumbent, Mr On Hing-Ying, died on 18 April 2014, while in office. During the subsequent by-election, Ms Tsang secured 55.7% of the vote and was duly elected on 7 September 2014. Regular District Council elections were held the following year during which Ms Tsang ran uncontested.

Ms Tsang was also a member of the Community Liaison Group for the Hong Kong Airport Authority regarding the introduction of the Third Runway, as a representative of the Islands District.

Tsang was found dead in her office on 1 May 2022, in a suspected charcoal-burning suicide.

== See also ==
- District Councils of Hong Kong
- Islands District Council
- Peng Chau

Political offices
Preceded by On Hing-ying	Member of the Islands District Council; Representative for Peng Chau and Hei Ling Chau; 2014–2022	Succeeded by
