= Peng Chau =

Island in Hong Kong

Coordinates: 22°17′7″N 114°2′19″E

坪洲
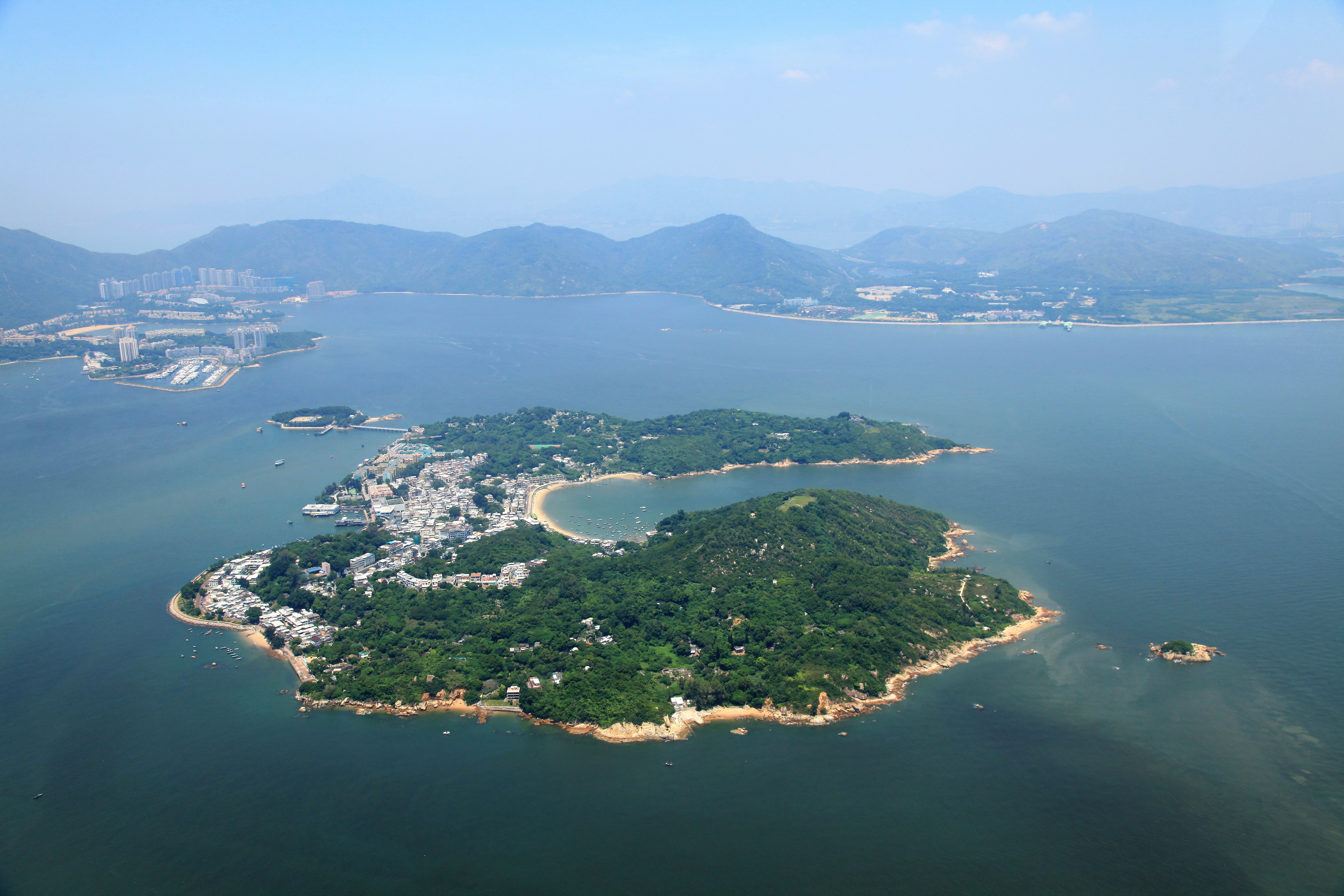
- Peng Chau from above

Geography
- Location: West of Hong Kong
- Area: 0.99 km^{2} (0.38 sq mi)
- Highest elevation: 95 m (312 ft)
- Highest point: Finger Hill

Administration
- Hong Kong
- District: Islands District
- Constituency: Peng Chau and Hei Ling Chau
- Elected Member (District Council): Josephine Tsang Sau-ho

Demographics
- Population: 6,487 (2016) (includes Hei Ling Chau)

Peng Chau
- Chinese: 坪洲
- Literal meaning: "Flat Island"
Transcriptions
Standard Mandarin
- Hanyu Pinyin: Píngzhōu
Yue: Cantonese
- Yale Romanization: Pìhng jāu
- Jyutping: Ping^{4} zau^{1}

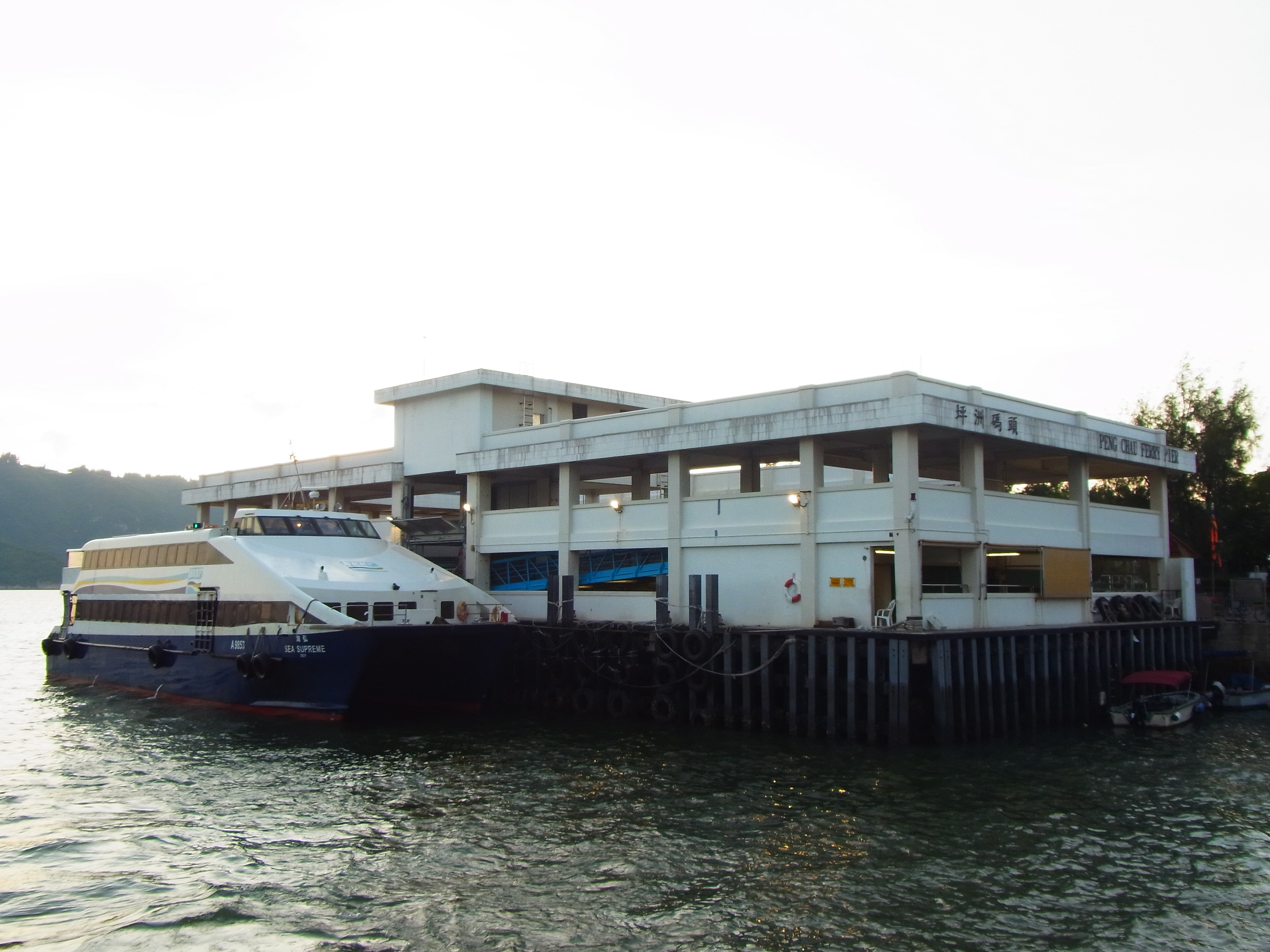
Peng Chau Ferry Pier.

Peng Chau is a small island located off the north-eastern coast of Lantau Island, Hong Kong. It is known locally for its temples, fishing industry and seafood.

== Geography ==
Peng Chau has an area of 0.99 km^{2} (0.38 sq mi) and a perimeter of about 5 km (3.1 mi). The tallest point of the island is Finger Hill (手指山), which is 95 m (312 ft) in height.

In 2003, the island underwent land degradation restorative work.

== Administration ==
Politically, Peng Chau is part of the Peng Chau & Hei Ling Chau constituency of the Islands District Council.

The government’s executive branch of the island includes the department of the Islands District Office of the Home Affairs Department.

The local police station belongs to the Cheung Chau Division of the Marine Police.

== Features ==
There are several temples on Peng Chau, including:

- Tin Hau temple (天后廟), built in 1792
- Golden Flower Shrine, dedicated to Lady Kam Fa (金花娘娘)
- Lung Mo Temple (龍母廟)
- Seven Sisters Temple (仙姐廟)

The island is also the site of the, now defunct, Peng Chau Theatre (坪洲戲院).

There are remains of the Sing Lei Hap Gei Lime Kiln Factory, established in the 19th century, and the Great China Match Company Factory, built in 1938.

The Fook Yuen Leather Factory, originally built in 1936, has been revitalised over the 2010s into a public art space becoming a popular tourist attraction now known as Leather Factory.

== Transportation ==
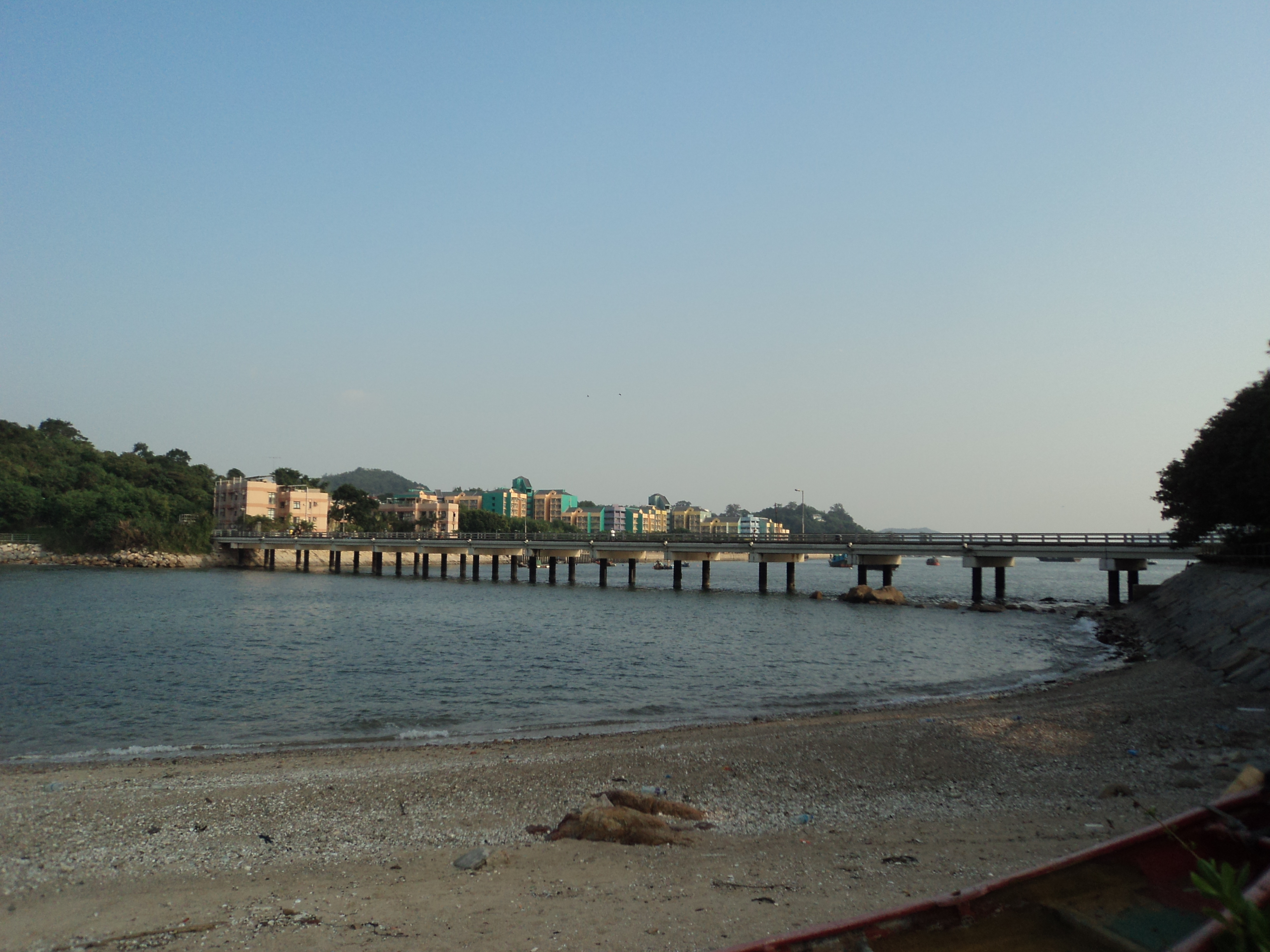
Peng Lei Road.

The main mode of transportation on the island is the bicycle, or on foot. Motor vehicles are not permitted on the island except emergency services, construction and village vehicles used for the transport of goods around the island.

Peng Chau is accessible by ferry from Central on Hong Kong Island (Hong Kong & Kowloon Ferry), or by ferry from Cheung Chau via Mui Wo and Chi Ma Wan (Sun Ferry), or by ferry from Discovery Bay on Lantau Island (Peng Chau Kaito).

The only ferry link to the nearby island, Hei Ling Chau, commences from Peng Chau (Hong Kong & Kowloon Ferry).

Helicopters are sometimes used in medical emergencies.

Peng Chau is linked to Tai Lei Island by a bridge. The bridge is part of Peng Lei Road. It is a popular fishing spot.

== Education ==
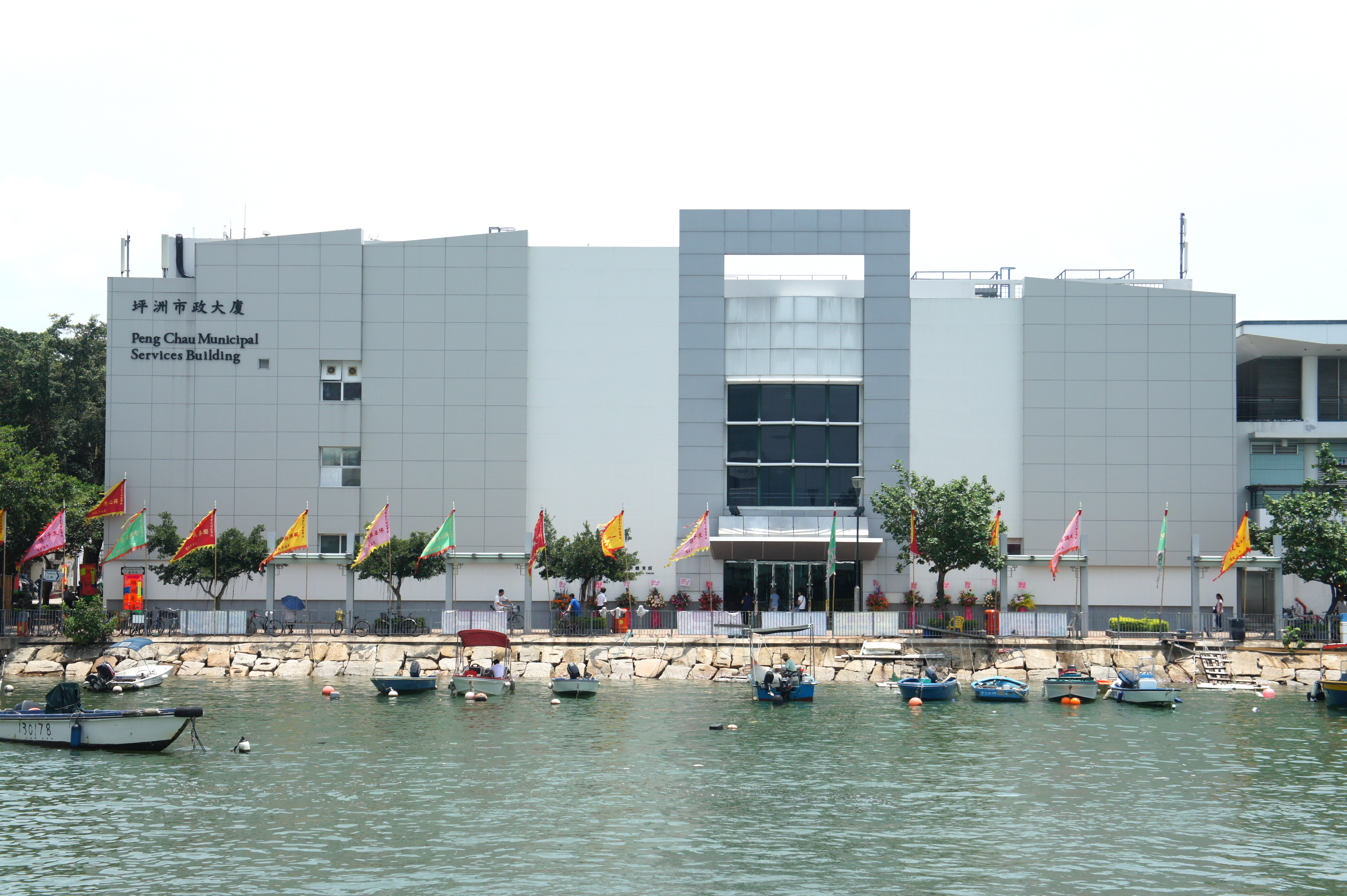
Peng Chau Municipal Services Building, which includes the Peng Chau Public Library

Peng Chau is in Primary One Admission (POA) School Net 99, which contains two aided schools: Holy Family School in Peng Chau and SKH Wei Lun Primary School in Discovery Bay; no government primary schools are in this net.

Hong Kong Public Libraries operates Peng Chau Public Library, which is located in the Peng Chau Municipal Services Building.

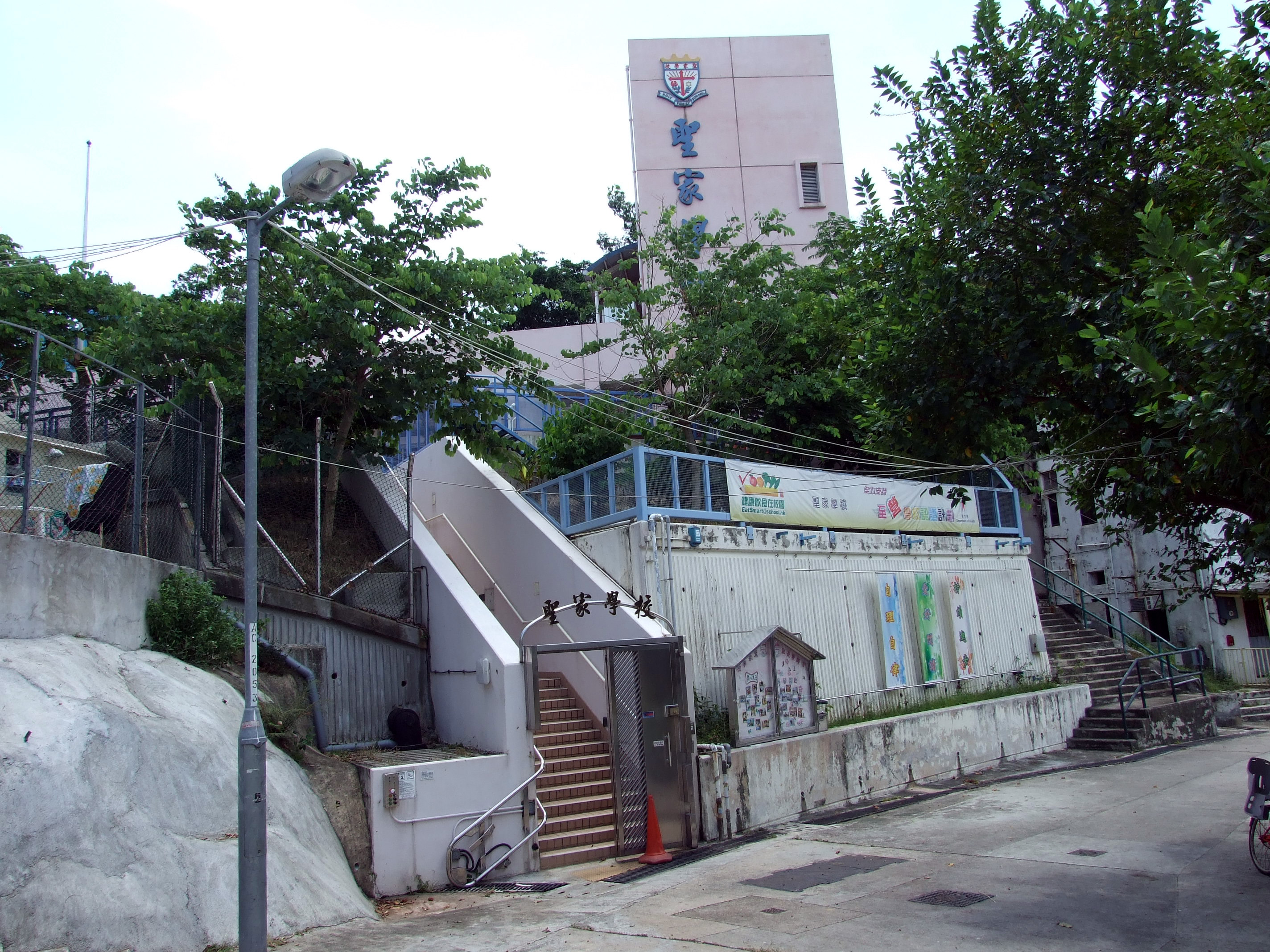
Holy Family School

== Emergency Services ==
The firestation featuring a fire engine that can only be found on outlying islands.

The Hong Kong Police Force operates the Peng Chau Police Post.

The police use bicycles to move around the island and do not have designated police cars unlike the Fire Services Department whom have their own firetrucks and ambulances on the island. However it is noted that the emergency vehicles found here are much smaller and distinct compared to those found in the main city.

The fire station is located on Po Peng Street, opposite of the waterfront playground, while the police post can be found on Wing On Side Street, next to the Government building.

These are the only two dedicated emergency service stations on the island.

== In popular culture ==
The 2015 Hong Kong film Wong Ka Yan was set in Peng Chau, starring Wong You Nam and Karena Ng.

== Climate ==
Climate data for Peng Chau (2005–2020)
| Month | Jan | Feb | Mar | Apr | May | Jun | Jul | Aug | Sep | Oct | Nov | Dec | Year |
|---|---|---|---|---|---|---|---|---|---|---|---|---|---|
| Mean daily maximum °C (°F) | 18.9 (66.0) | 19.7 (67.5) | 21.9 (71.4) | 25.3 (77.5) | 28.7 (83.7) | 30.6 (87.1) | 31.5 (88.7) | 31.6 (88.9) | 31.0 (87.8) | 28.4 (83.1) | 24.8 (76.6) | 20.5 (68.9) | 26.1 (78.9) |
| Daily mean °C (°F) | 15.9 (60.6) | 16.8 (62.2) | 19.1 (66.4) | 22.3 (72.1) | 25.9 (78.6) | 27.7 (81.9) | 28.5 (83.3) | 28.2 (82.8) | 27.8 (82.0) | 25.6 (78.1) | 22.1 (71.8) | 17.6 (63.7) | 23.1 (73.6) |
| Mean daily minimum °C (°F) | 13.8 (56.8) | 14.8 (58.6) | 17.1 (62.8) | 20.3 (68.5) | 23.9 (75.0) | 25.8 (78.4) | 26.2 (79.2) | 25.9 (78.6) | 25.6 (78.1) | 23.6 (74.5) | 20.0 (68.0) | 15.3 (59.5) | 21.0 (69.8) |
| Average precipitation mm (inches) | 30.6 (1.20) | 25.0 (0.98) | 62.0 (2.44) | 108.1 (4.26) | 274.5 (10.81) | 402.8 (15.86) | 263.3 (10.37) | 309.6 (12.19) | 174.6 (6.87) | 53.2 (2.09) | 29.5 (1.16) | 17.6 (0.69) | 1,750.8 (68.92) |
| Average relative humidity (%) | 76.7 | 82.0 | 84.0 | 86.1 | 87.5 | 88.4 | 86.4 | 87.0 | 82.8 | 76.0 | 76.8 | 71.2 | 82.1 |
Source: Hong Kong Observatory

== See also ==
- List of islands and peninsulas of Hong Kong
- Finger Hill
- List of places in Hong Kong
