= Vehicular harbour crossings in Hong Kong =

There are three vehicular harbour crossings in Hong Kong, linking the Kowloon peninsula with Hong Kong Island. They are as follows:

Tunnel	Picture	Hong Kong Island Side Entrance	Kowloon Side Entrance	Tunnel Distance	Total Number of lanes	Opening Date	Private Consortium Expiry Date
Cross-Harbour Tunnel		Causeway Bay	Hung Hom	1.86 km (1.16 mi)	4	2 August 1972	1 September 1999
Eastern Harbour Crossing		Quarry Bay	Cha Kwo Ling	2.22 km (1.38 mi)	4	21 September 1989	7 August 2016
Western Harbour Crossing		Sai Ying Pun	Yau Ma Tei	1.98 km (1.23 mi)	6	30 April 1997	3 August 2023

== History ==
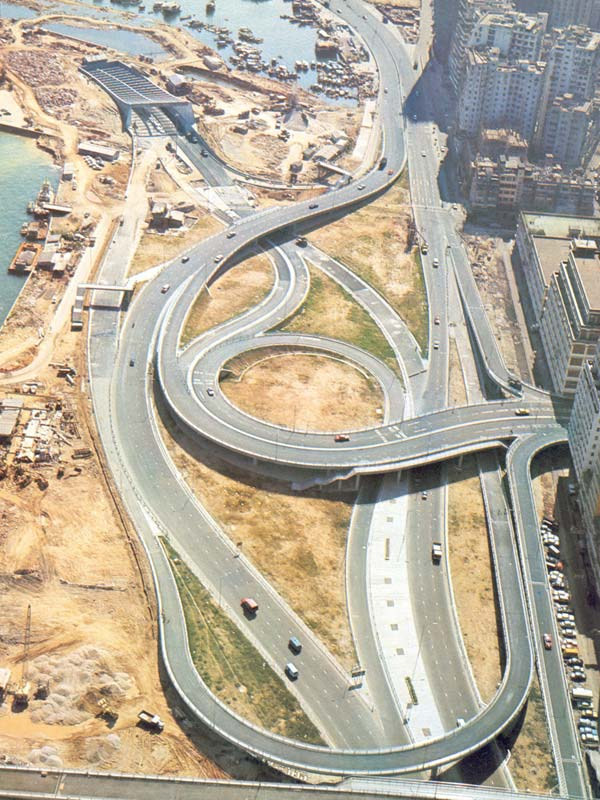
The area around the Hong Kong Island entrance of the Cross-Harbour Tunnel in the 1970s; the tunnel was under construction.

Prior to the opening of the Cross-Harbour Tunnel, vehicular traffic travelling across the Victoria Harbour relied on ferry services as early as 1933. The Cross-Harbour Tunnel opened in 1972. The ever increasing population in Hong Kong and improving prosperity made the construction of further tunnels a necessity. The harbour crossing ferry services continued on until 1998 when Hongkong and Yaumati Ferry ceased to operate these ferry services.

The Eastern Harbor Crossing (opened September 1989) and the Western Harbor Crossing (opened 1997) were subsequently built across Victoria Harbour to ease the burden on the Cross-Harbour Tunnel. For all three tunnels, the government opted for a 30-year private-sector franchise based on a build–operate–transfer model.

Two reasons include the less convenient locations of the other two tunnels compared with the Cross-Harbour Tunnel, and more importantly the control of new tunnels by the powerful state-owned investment group CITIC Pacific. The tolls for crossing each of the other two tunnels are significantly higher, and were further increased in 2005 by up to 67% to boost investment returns. Another possible reason for added traffic is induced demand, a theory in transportation planning which posits that the more roads that are created, the more people will choose to commute by car. In this case, by adding additional tunnels, it may have encouraged more people to drive overall, because of a perception that there is increased road capacity.

The Government of Hong Kong granted the franchises by enacting legislation that also fixed the revenue and fare model of the tunnel and is thus powerless to prevent the sharp increase in tolls despite public uproar when toll increases were applied for.

== Mooting a fourth harbour crossing ==
The fourth harbour crossing is being proposed in Hong Kong as the fourth underwater tunnel to cross the Victoria Harbour to ease the traffic through the Cross-Harbour Tunnel. Even though the Western Harbour Crossing, operated by CITIC Pacific Limited, was built for this purpose, the tolls for crossing is triple the rates of the Cross-Harbour Tunnel, proving the Western Harbour Crossing ineffective in diverting traffic from the Cross-Harbour Tunnel. Around this time, a new tunnel between North Point and Kowloon Bay was suggested to relieve the stress on the Cross-Harbour Tunnel.

However, the Hong Kong government suffered from the East Asian financial crisis in 1997, and all major projects were put on hold. It was not until 2005 that the topic was brought up again, as the Eastern Harbour Crossing (also operated by CITITC Pacific Limited) announced it would increase its toll prices. It was predicted that 1/3 of traffic from the eastern crossing would use the Cross-Harbour Tunnel instead as a result of the price hike, and the influx would certainly be disastrous for the already overloaded tunnel. The call for a fourth tunnel was revived to counter the problem.

A new proposal stated that the new crossing would be an immersed tube joining a reclamation site off Hung Hom with Victoria Park in Causeway Bay. The toll booths would be placed at the Kowloon end, and would join Route 5 there. At the Hong Kong Island end there would be a major interchange located under the Victoria Park, connecting with the Island Eastern Corridor. This proposal was deemed the most likely to happen.

== Demand ==
According to the annual traffic census published by the Transport Department, In 2011, the average daily vehicular traffic crossing the harbour amounted to 247,113 trips, a year-on-year increase of 2.1%. Total trips made amounted to 90.2 million, of which 48.8% was through the Cross Harbour Tunnel (44 million trips), 28.1% through the Eastern Harbour Crossing (25.4 million trips) and 23.0% through the Western Harbour Crossing (20.8 million trips). 40,000 vehicular trips across the harbour were by ferry. Because of its convenient location and its low tolls, the Cross-Harbour Tunnel (CHT) is the most heavily used among all three vehicular tunnels. According to the consultancy report in 2010, the CHT enjoys a daily traffic of approximately 120,000 vehicle-trips, far exceeding the tunnel's design capacity of 78,000 trips per day. At the EHC, also designed to carry 78 000 vehicle trips, the actual daily average number of trips is about 70,000. The WHC and the connecting roads have capacity of 55,000 trips, yet experiences 60,000 vehicle-trips each day (109% of capacity).

=== Fare comparison between tunnels ===
The fare for the three tunnels have been centralised in 17 December 2023 by the government, with a Time-varying Toll Plan rolled out.

Vehicle Category	Fees
Motorcycles, motortricycles	HK$8–24
Private vehicles	HK$20–60
Taxis	HK$25
Public and Private Light Buses	HK$50
LGV (Under 5.5 Tonnes)	HK$50
MGV (>5.5 <24 Tonnes)	HK$50
HGV (Over 24 Tonnes)	HK$50
Single-decker buses*	HK$50
Double-decker buses*	HK$50
Each additional axle in excess of two	Free
as of Aug 2024; Source: Transport Department *Franchised buses are exempted from paying tunnel fees

In late October 2010, a consultant hired by the Government finished a study to find out possible ways to ease the congestion on the Tunnel. In the study, they suggested that the Cross Harbour tunnel toll be raised by HK$5 and the EHC toll be reduced by HK$5. This could halve the amount of traffic on the Cross Harbour tunnel. There have been suggestions that the traffic be diverted equally among the three tunnels by equalising the tolls. However, the consultants ruled out equalisation as they project massive traffic jams at the feeder roads of WHC – the exit on the Hong Kong Island side to Route 4 towards Central is heavily congested during rush hour. This problem persisted until the Central–Wan Chai Bypass was completed.

== Dangerous Goods Vehicular Ferry ==
HYF, the original car ferry operator continues to use the ferries to transport commercial vehicles on their Dangerous Goods Vehicular Ferry Service routes between North Point, Kwun Tong, and Mui Wo.

== Temporary return of car ferry ==
A brief car ferry service was operated by Harbour Cruise Bauhinia from the North Point Ferry Pier to Kwun Tong Public Pier in early 2016 to mark the 83rd anniversary of the first car ferry service in Hong Kong.

== See also ==
- List of tunnels and bridges in Hong Kong
