= Fort Street (constituency) =

Constituency of the Eastern District Council of Hong Kong

Coordinates: 22.290°N 114.198°E

- Elected constituency for the Eastern District Council
- Boundary of Fort Street in Eastern District
- District: Eastern
- Legislative Council constituency: Hong Kong Island East
- Population: 16,157 (2019)
- Electorate: 7,376 (2019)

Current constituency
- Created: 1994
- Number of members: One
- Member: Vacant
- Created from: North Point North; North Point South

Fort Street is one of the 35 constituencies in the Eastern District, Hong Kong. The constituency returns one district councillor to the Eastern District Council, with an election every four years.

Fort Street constituency is loosely based on the area of Fort Street in North Point with estimated population of 16,157.

== Councillors represented ==
Election	Member	Party	%
1994	Chu Hon-wah	DAB	59.30
1999	Chu Hon-wah	DAB	N/A
2003	Choi Sai-chuen	Independent	50.03
2005 by-election	Hung Lin-cham	DAB	56.80
2007	Hung Lin-cham	DAB	N/A
2011	Hung Lin-cham	DAB	N/A
2015	Hung Lin-cham	DAB	N/A
2019	Karrine Fu Kai-lam→Vacant (Note: Resigned on 31 May 2021 over new oath-taking law.)	Independent	50.61

== Election results ==
=== 2010s ===
Eastern District Council Election, 2019: Fort Street
Party	Candidate	Votes	%	±%
Nonpartisan	Karrine Fu Kai-lam	2,464	50.61	
DAB	Hung Lin-cham	2,405	49.39	
Majority		59	1.22	
Turnout		4,874	66.09	
Nonpartisan gain from DAB		Swing		

Eastern District Council Election, 2015: Fort Street
Party	Candidate	Votes	%	±%
DAB	Hung Lin-cham	Unopposed		
DAB hold		Swing		

Eastern District Council Election, 2011: Fort Street
Party	Candidate	Votes	%	±%
DAB	Hung Lin-cham	Unopposed		
DAB hold		Swing		

=== 2000s ===
Eastern District Council Election, 2007: Fort Street
Party	Candidate	Votes	%	±%
DAB	Hung Lin-cham	Unopposed		
DAB hold		Swing		

Tsui Wan by-election 2005
Party	Candidate	Votes	%	±%
DAB	Hung Lin-cham	1,173	56.80	+6.83
Democratic	Chris Wong Shing-fai	783	37.92	
Civic	Barry Chin Chi-yung	109	5.28	
Majority		39	4.08	
DAB gain from Nonpartisan		Swing		

Eastern District Council Election, 2003: Fort Street
Party	Candidate	Votes	%	±%
Nonpartisan	Choi Sai-chuen	944	50.03	
DAB	Chu Hon-wah	943	49.97	−2.07
Majority		1	0.06	
Nonpartisan gain from DAB		Swing		

=== 1990s ===
Eastern District Council Election, 1999: Fort Street
Party	Candidate	Votes	%	±%
DAB	Chu Hon-wah	Unopposed		
DAB hold		Swing		

Eastern District Board Election, 1994: Fort Street
Party	Candidate	Votes	%	±%
DAB	Chu Hon-wah	835	59.30	
Liberal	So Yau-hang	573	40.70	
Majority		724	18.60	
DAB win (new seat)				
