= Harbour Cruise Bauhinia =

Cruise in Victoria Harbour, Hong Kong

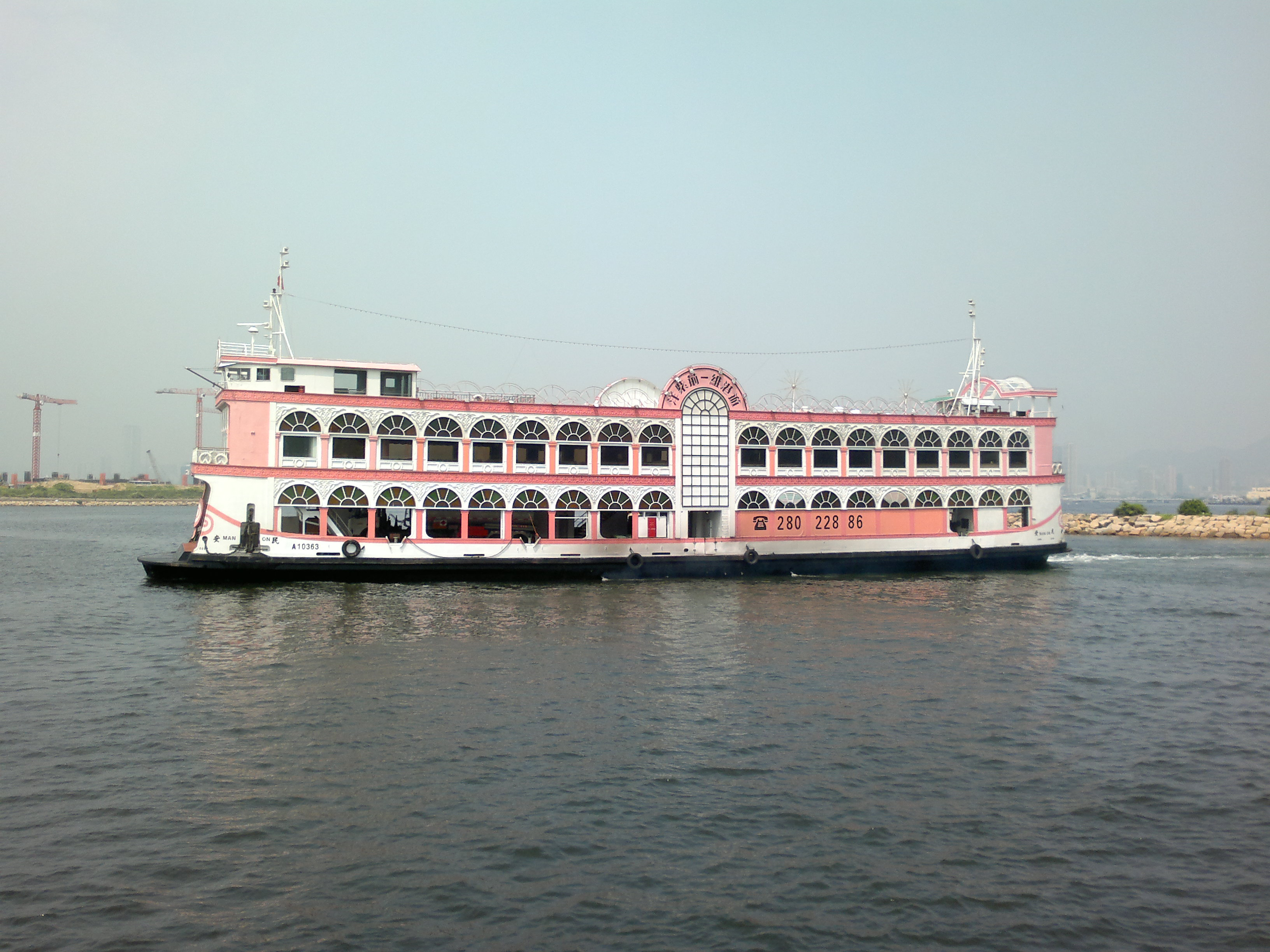
Harbour Cruise Bauhinia

Harbour Cruise Bauhinia is a sightseeing and dining cruise in Victoria Harbour, Hong Kong. It is named after Bauhinia, the City Flower of Hong Kong and the regional emblem of Hong Kong. The brand is a member of the Hong Kong Ferry Group.

== Overview ==
The company's vessels are one of the operating tourist boat fleets in Hong Kong, tourist boats have been an integral part of the history of Hong Kong public transportation. They are the only company in Hong Kong that owns a ferry fleet with Marine Restaurant License, Liquor License and Entertainment Licenses.

The cruise leaves from North Point and Hung Hom Pier, and offers a 2 hour long journey around Victoria harbour. While on board, passengers are treated to a Dinner buffet, as well as a panoramic view of the laser show A Symphony of Lights. In addition to sightseeing, the fleet also hosts services such as charter cruises, product launches, classic vehicular (transport) services, cocktail parties, conferences, religious ceremonies, wedding ceremonies and banquets.

In a brief period during 2016, the company used offered vehicular ferry services from North Point Ferry Pier and Kwun Tong Ferry Pier. The service was part of the celebration of the 83rd anniversary of Hong Kong Ferry's historic vehicular ferry service, which ceased operation in 1998.

During 2023, the Hong Kong Tourism Association launched a trial program which increased Harbour Cruise Bauhinia's services to accommodate a sudden surge of tourists from mainland China. The program was deemed popular among mainland Chinese budget tour groups, plans were submitted to the government to expand operations to include more piers in Tsim Sha Tsui, Hung Hom, Wan Chai and Central.

== Fleet ==
The fleet consists of four repurposed retired vehicular transport vessels, originally owned by Hongkong and Yaumati Ferry. They feature an air-conditioned banquet floor and outdoor upper deck.

Name	Type	Seats	Builder	Year built	Notes
Man On		378		1981	
Man Lok		402		1982	
Man Kim		560		1975	
Man Foo		500		1982	

== See also ==
- Duk Ling
- Aqua Luna
- Hong Kong Ferry
