= Sun Ferry =

Hong Kong ferry operator

Sun Ferry Services Company Limited
- Formerly: New World First Ferry Services Limited
- Type: Subsidiary
- Industry: Transportation
- Founded: 1999
- Headquarters: Hong Kong
- Owner: Chu Kong Shipping Enterprises (100%)

Chinese name
- Traditional Chinese: 新渡輪服務有限公司
- Simplified Chinese: 新渡轮服务有限公司
- Jyutping: San1 dou6 leon4 fuk6 mou6 jau5 haan6 gung1 si1
- Cantonese Yale: Sān douh lèuhn fuhk mouh yáuh haahn gūng sī
- Hanyu Pinyin: Xīndùlún fúwù yǒuxiàn gōngsī
Transcriptions
Standard Mandarin
- Hanyu Pinyin: Xīndùlún fúwù yǒuxiàn gōngsī
Yue: Cantonese
- Yale Romanization: Sān douh lèuhn fuhk mouh yáuh haahn gūng sī
- Jyutping: San1 dou6 leon4 fuk6 mou6 jau5 haan6 gung1 si1

Former Chinese name
- Traditional Chinese: 新世界第一渡輪服務有限公司
- Simplified Chinese: 新世界第一渡轮服务有限公司
- Jyutping: San1 sai3 gaai3 dai6 jat1 dou6 leon4 fuk6 mou6 jau5 haan6 gung1 si1
- Cantonese Yale: Sān sai gaai daih yāt douh lèuhn fuhk mouh yáuh haahn gūng sī
- Hanyu Pinyin: Xīnshìjiè dìyī dùlún fúwù yǒuxiàn gōngsī
- Literal meaning: New World First Ferry Services Limited
Transcriptions
Standard Mandarin
- Hanyu Pinyin: Xīnshìjiè dìyī dùlún fúwù yǒuxiàn gōngsī
Yue: Cantonese
- Yale Romanization: Sān sai gaai daih yāt douh lèuhn fuhk mouh yáuh haahn gūng sī
- Jyutping: San1 sai3 gaai3 dai6 jat1 dou6 leon4 fuk6 mou6 jau5 haan6 gung1 si1
- Website: www.sunferry.com.hk

Sun Ferry Services Company Limited, more widely known as Sun Ferry (Chinese: 新渡輪) and formerly New World First Ferry Services Limited (in short New World First Ferry, First Ferry or NWFF), is a ferry service company in Hong Kong. The company was established in November 1999, when it took over the eight licensed ferry routes transferred from Hongkong and Yaumati Ferry in January 2000.

== Background ==
When the company commenced its service on 15 January 2000, it bought 14 ferries and rented seven hovercraft and catamarans from its predecessor. Since then it has introduced 10 fast vessels on Outlying Islands routes to phase out the rented vessels and to improve services.

It used to have a subsidiary, New World First Ferry Services (Macau) Limited (abbreviated New World First Ferry (Macau)), which operated a high-speed ferry service between Kowloon (China Ferry Terminal in Tsim Sha Tsui) and Macau (Hong Kong–Macau Ferry Pier). In 2011, it was sold to Shun Tak–China Travel Ship Management Limited, the owner of TurboJET. That subsidiary has now been renamed.

== Routes ==
It operates the following routes:

- Central to Cheung Chau and Mui Wo
- Circular between Peng Chau, Mui Wo, Chi Ma Wan, and Cheung Chau
- North Point to Hung Hom and Kowloon City
- North Point to Joss House Bay (大廟灣) (special service which only operates on Tin Hau-birthday-festival)

Ceased routes:

- Central to Peng Chau
- Tsim Sha Tsui to Mui Wo and Cheung Chau
- Tuen Mun to Tai O (via: Tung Chung and Sha Lo Wan)
- Tuen Mun to Chek Lap Kok / Tung Chung

Inter-cities

- Hong Kong to Macau (sold to TurboJET in 2011)

== Fleet ==
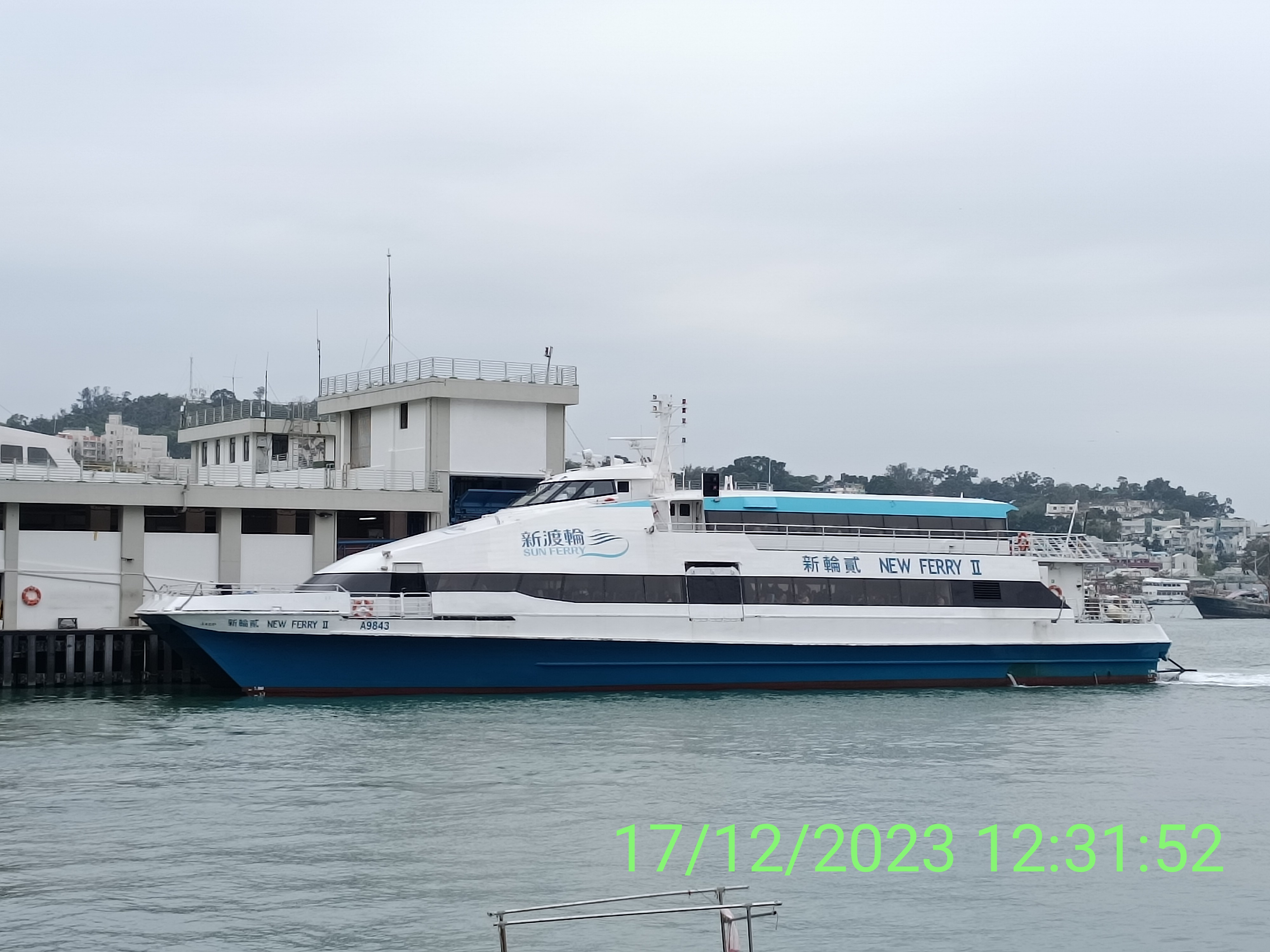
Fast ferry New Ferry II (type Flying Cat) for Outlying Islands Routes and the Macau service

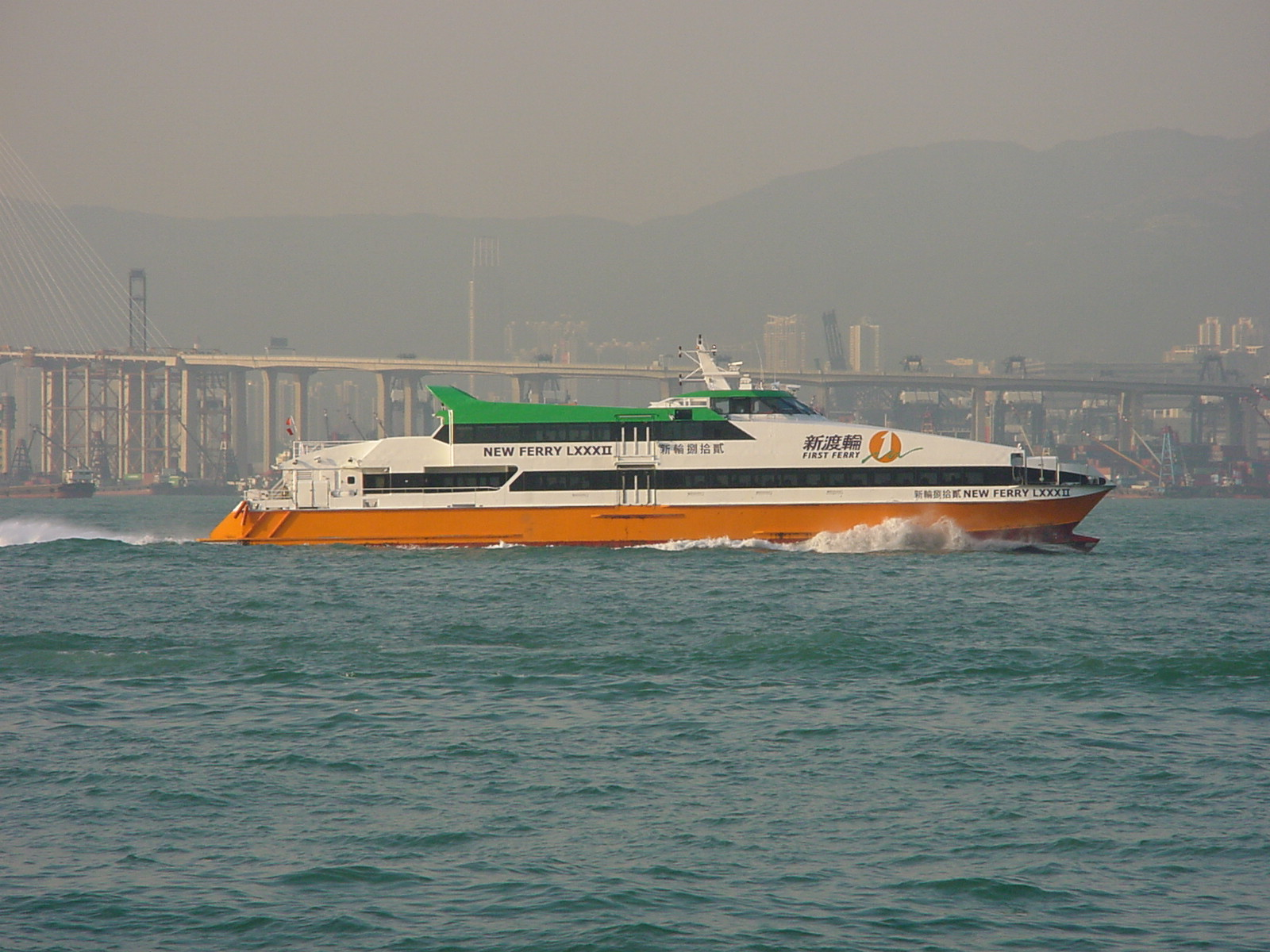
Fast ferry New Ferry LXXXII (type Austal 48m) for the Macau service

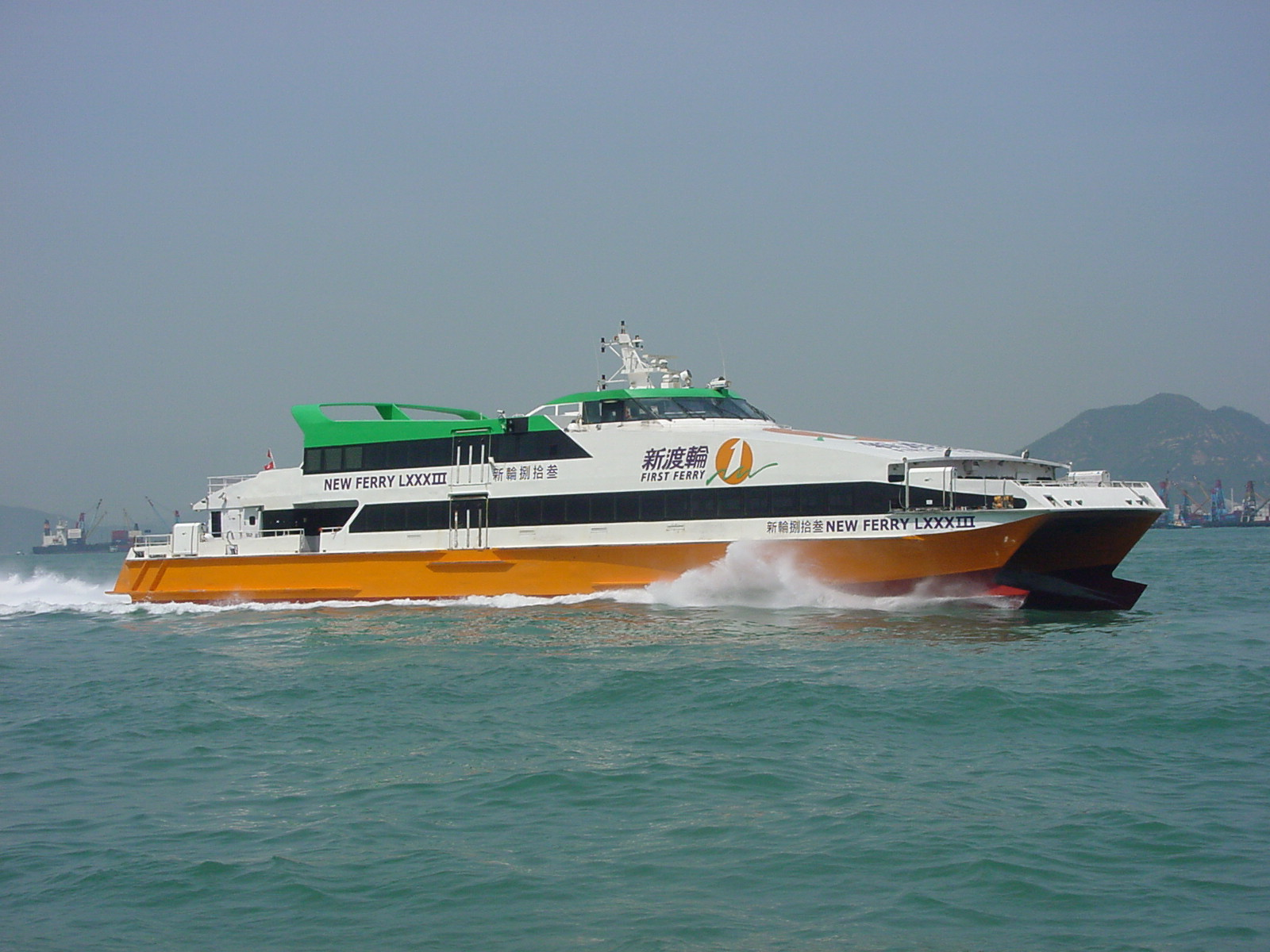
Fast ferry New Ferry LXXXIII (type Austal 48m) for the Macau service

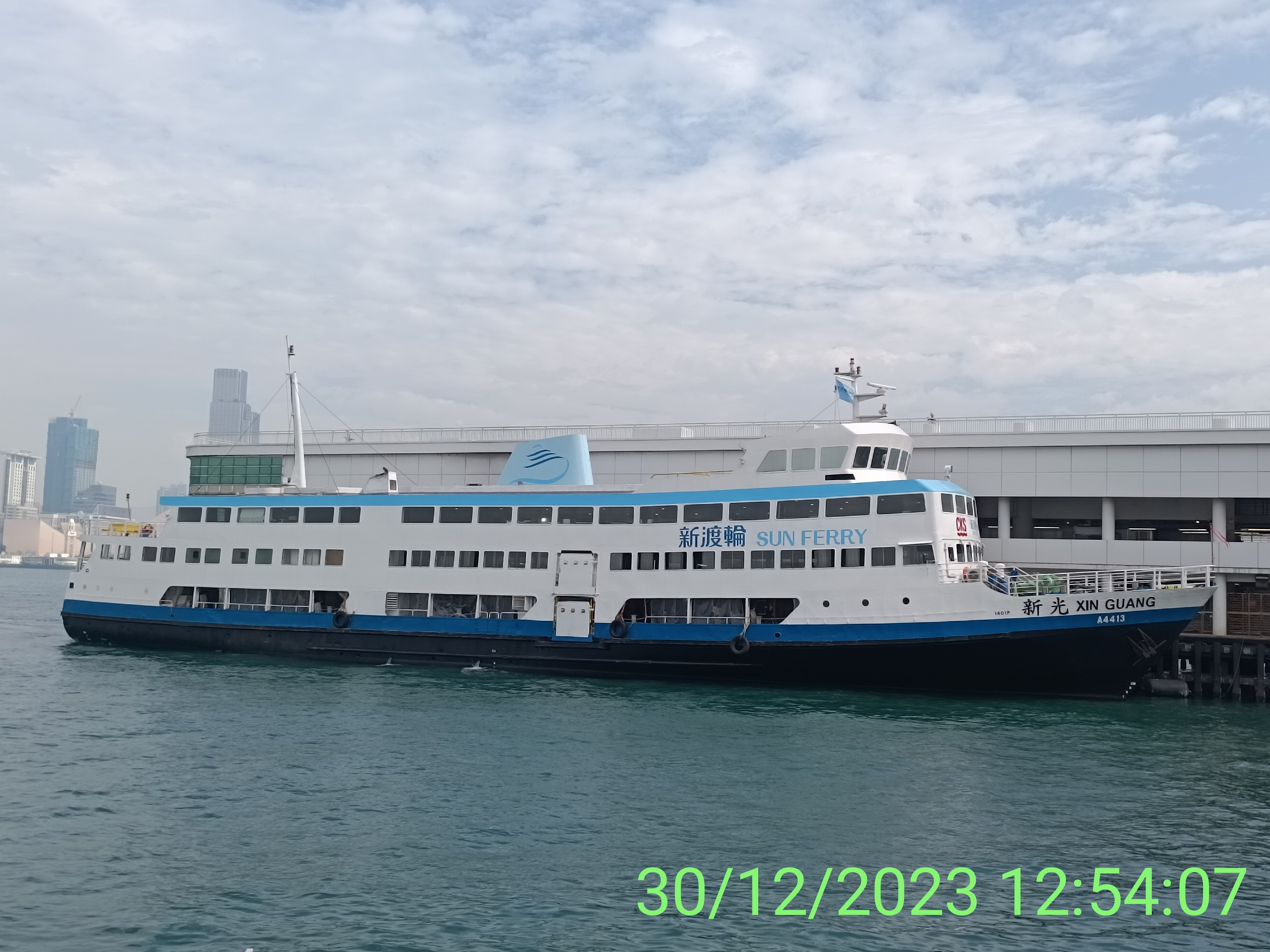
Triple-decker ferry Xin Guang for outlying-islands ferry service

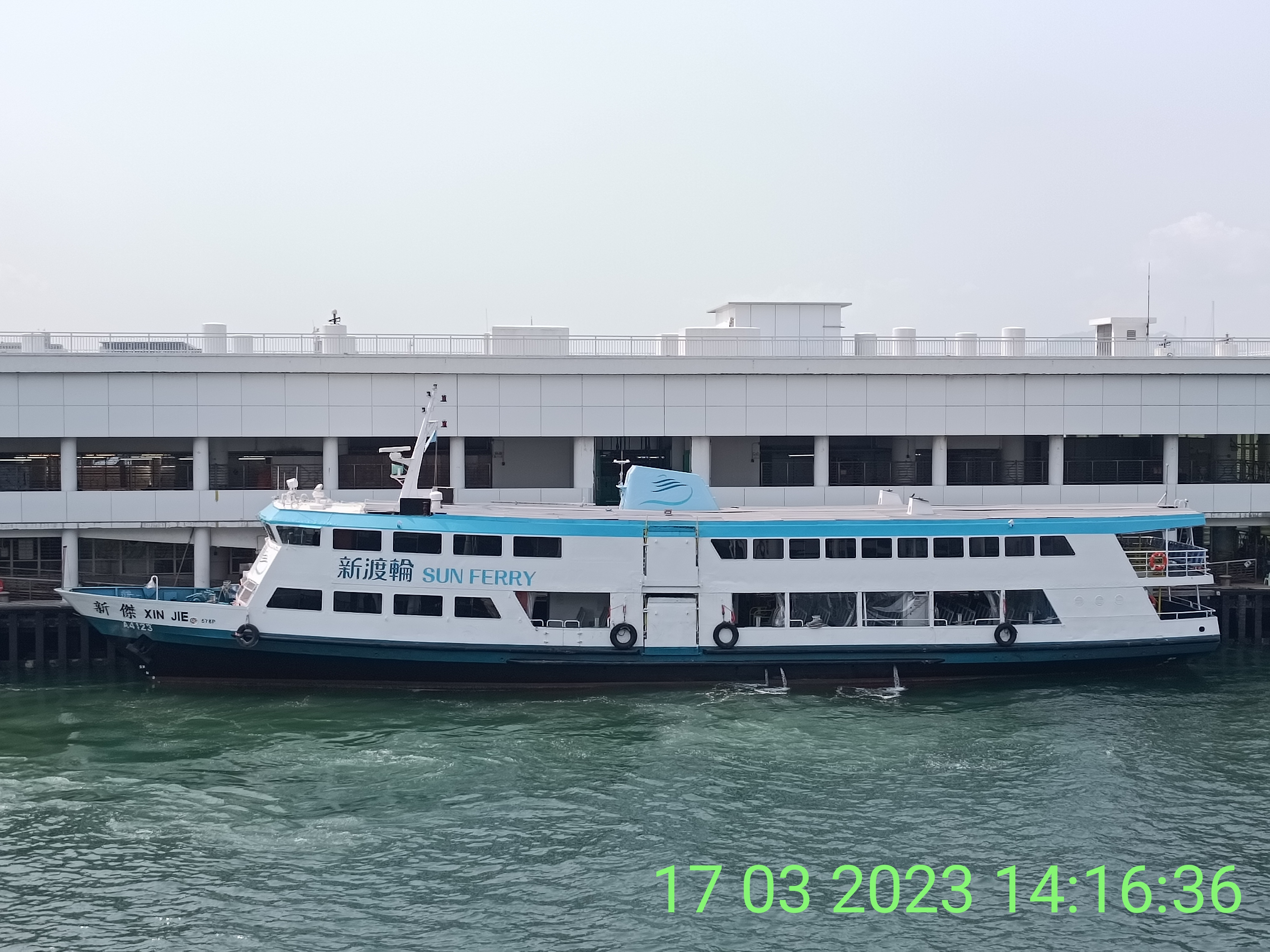
Double-decker ferry Xin Jie for outlying-islands ferry service

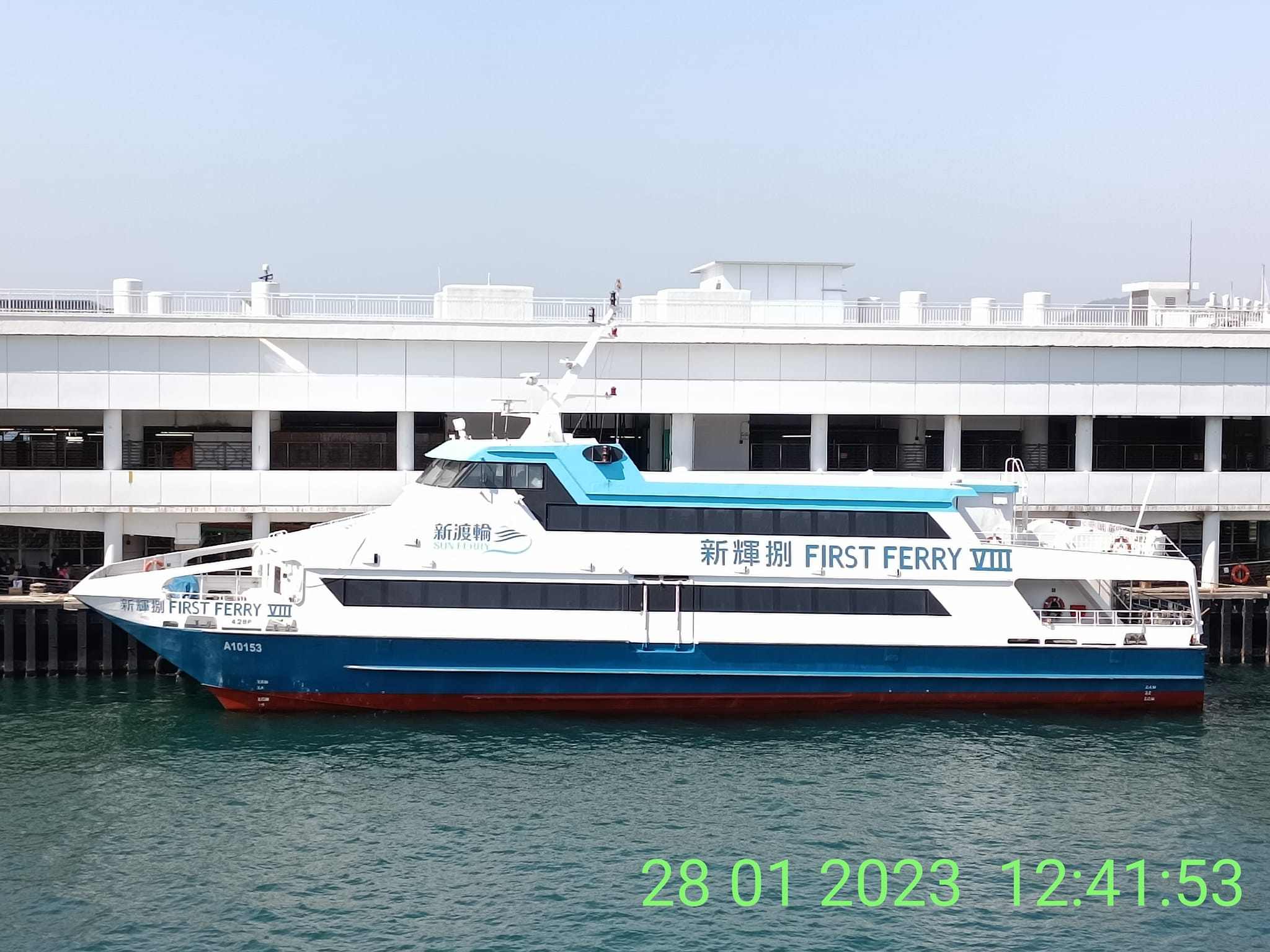
Fast Ferry First Ferry VIII for outlying-islands ferry service

=== Current fleet ===
Sun Ferry Current Fleet
Name	Type	Reg	Year built	Builder	Seats	Notes
Xin Zhong (新忠)	Double-decker ferry	A3763	1982	Hong Kong Shipyard	652	Ex-Man Chung (民忠)
Xin Ying (新英)	Double-decker ferry	A3873	1982	Hong Kong Shipyard	574	Ex-Man Ying (民英)
Xin Jie (新傑)	Double-decker ferry	A4123	1983	Hong Kong Shipyard	647	Ex-Man Kit (民傑)
Xin Fa (新發)	Triple-decker ferry	A3623	1981	Hong Kong Shipyard	1138	Ex-Man Fat (民發)
Xin Chao (新超)	Triple-decker ferry	A4313	1983	Hong Kong Shipyard	1645	Ex-Man Chiu (民超)
Xin Guang (新光)	Triple-decker ferry	A4413	1985	Hong Kong Shipyard	1416	Ex-Man Kwong (民光)
Xin Fei (新飛)	Triple-decker ferry	A4623	1986	Hong Kong Shipyard	1460	Ex-Man Fee (民飛)
Xin Guo (新國)	Triple-decker ferry	A4773	1988	Hong Kong Shipyard	1576	Ex-Man Kwok (民國)
First Ferry III (新輝叄)	High-speed craft	A10003	2000	Marinteknik (Singapore) Shipyard	428	Ex-Aquan III
First Ferry V (新輝伍)	High-speed craft	A10013	2000	Marinteknik (Singapore) Shipyard	428	Ex-Aquan V
First Ferry VI (新輝陸)	High-speed craft	A10043	2001	Marinteknik (Singapore) Shipyard	428	Ex-Aquan VI
First Ferry VII (新輝柒)	High-speed craft	A10053	2001	Marinteknik (Singapore) Shipyard	428	Ex-Aquan VII
First Ferry VIII (新輝捌)	High-speed craft	A10153	2002	Marinteknik (Singapore) Shipyard	428	
First Ferry IX (新輝玖)	High-speed craft	A10293	2003	Wang Tak Engineering & Shipbuilding, Guangzhou	235	
First Ferry X (新輝拾)	High-speed craft	A10313	2003	Wang Tak Engineering & Shipbuilding, Guangzhou	235	
First Ferry XI (新輝拾壹)	High-speed craft	A10343	2003	Wang Tak Engineering & Shipbuilding, Guangzhou	235	
New Ferry II (新輪貳)	Jet catamaran	A9843	1993	Kvaerner Fjellstrand	433	Ex-HKF II
First Ferry XVIII (新輝拾捌)	Jet catamaran	A143810	1994	Austal Shipyard	440	Ex-Shun Jing in Chu Kong Shipping Enterprises; start service in Sun Ferry on 1 October 2020
HEY	Launch	A8163	1995	Zhuhai Shipbuilding Industry Company	333	Owned by Fortune Ferry
Sing Way 18	Launch	A8173	1995	Zhuhai Shipbuilding Industry Company	333	Owned by Sing Wai Launch Service Co
Full River	Launch	A8723	1995	Zhuhai Shipbuilding Industry Company	294	Owned by Fortune Ferry
Sing Wai 6	Launch	A8813	1995	Zhuhai Shipbuilding Industry Company	328	Owned by Sing Wai Launch Service Co
Lucky Jumbo	Launch	A8973	1995	Zhuhai Shipbuilding Industry Company	400	Owned by Sing Wai Launch Service Co
Plenty River	Launch	A8983	1995	Zhuhai Shipbuilding Industry Company	352	Owned by Fortune Ferry
Sing Way 11	Launch	A9693	1998	Zhuhai Shipbuilding Industry Company	369	Owned by Sing Wai Launch Service Co
Ming River	Launch	A9883	1999	Zhuhai Shipbuilding Industry Company	397	Owned by Fortune Ferry

=== Former fleet ===
New World First Ferry Former Fleet
Name	Type	Reg	Year built	Builder	Seats	Notes
Xin Xian (新顯)		A4083	1982	Hong Kong Shipyard	618	Ex-Man Heen (民顯); sold in 2009 as security patrol boat and renamed Glenn Victory
Xin Xing (新興)	Triple-decker ferry	A3343	1981	Hong Kong Shipyard	1298	Ex-Man Hing (民興); sold to Huizhou in 2010
First Ferry I (新輝壹)	High-speed craft	A9543	1997	Afai Shipyard	200	Ex-Aquan One; sold to Vietnam in 2011
First Ferry II (新輝貳)	High-speed craft	A9893	1999	Afai Shipyard	288	Ex-Aquan Two; sold to Vietnam in 2011
New Ferry I (新輪壹)		N/A	1993	Kvaerner Fjellstrand	433	Ex-HKF I; sold to Turkey in 2008
New Ferry III (新輪參)		A9863	1993	Kvaerner Fjellstrand	433	Ex-HKF III; sold to Indonesia in 2012
New Ferry V (新輪伍)		A10023	2001	Damen Shipyard	406	Sold to TurboJET and renamed Universal MK V (宇航五號)
New Ferry VI (新輪陸)		A10143	2002	Damen Shipyard	406	
New Ferry LXXXI (新輪捌拾壹)		N/A	2002	Austal Shipyard	414	Sold to TurboJET and renamed Universal MK 2013 (宇航2013)
New Ferry LXXXII (新輪捌拾貳)		N/A	2002	Austal Shipyard	414	Sold to TurboJET and renamed Universal MK 2014 (宇航2014)
New Ferry LXXXIII (新輪捌拾叁)		N/A	2002	Austal Shipyard	414	Sold to TurboJET and renamed Universal MK 2015 (宇航2015)
New Ferry LXXXV (新輪捌拾伍)		N/A	2004	Austal Shipyard	418	Sold to TurboJET and renamed Universal MK 2016 (宇航2016)
New Ferry LXXXVI (新輪捌拾陸)		N/A	2004	Austal Shipyard	418	Sold to TurboJET and renamed Universal MK 2017 (宇航2017)
New Ferry LXXXVII (新輪捌拾柒)		N/A	2007	Austal Shipyard	418	Sold to TurboJET in summer 2008 before the launch of NWFF (Macau); renamed Universal MK 2011 (宇航2011)
New Ferry LXXXVIII (新輪捌拾捌)		N/A	2007	Austal Shipyard	418	Sold to TurboJET in summer 2008 before the launch of NWFF (Macau); renamed Universal MK 2012 (宇航2012)
First Travel XXXI (新旅遊參拾壹)	Tour boat	N/A	2003	Austal Shipyard	367	Sold to Tianjin in 2007
First Travel XXXII (新旅遊參拾貳)	Tour boat	A10373	2003	Austal Shipyard	352	Sold to Indonesia in 2012
Sado (海榮)	HM527	N/A	1984	Hovermarine International	200	
Mondego (海華)	HM527	N/A	1984	Hovermarine International	200	
Tejo (海富)	HM527	N/A	1983	Hovermarine International	200	
Sing Wai 28	Monohull	N/A	2002	Henry Shipbuilding, Zhuhai	97	Owned by Sing Wai Launch Co
King Dragon 3	Monohull	N/A	1995	Cheoy Lee Shipyard	97	Owned by Vicky Transportation Co
Hung Wai 11	High-speed craft	N/A	1997	Cheoy Lee Shipyard	208	Owned by Sing Wai Launch Service Co
Laissez Faire 33	High-speed craft	N/A	1997	Cheoy Lee Shipyard	201	
Fiord	High-speed craft	N/A	1997	Cheoy Lee Shipyard	208	Owned by Sing Wai Launch Service Co
Expenses 6	High-speed craft	N/A	1997	Cheoy Lee Shipyard	207	Owned by Sing Wai Launch Service Co
New Ferry XXV (新輪貳拾伍)	Support vessel	N/A	1974	Hong Kong Shipyard	45	Ex-HYF 11

== Ownership ==
New World First Ferry was owned by NWS Holdings via NWS Transport Services. In the past, Chow Tai Fook Enterprises, parent company of NWS Holdings, owned 50% shares of NWS Transport Services until 2016.

New World First Ferry and NWS Holdings are named after New World Development, the flagship listed company of Chow Tai Fook group.

In May 2020, New World First Ferry was sold to Chinese government owned Chu Kong Shipping Enterprises. Chu Kong Shipping Enterprises is the parent company of Chu Kong Passenger Transport, which offers inter-cities passenger liner, for cities of the Pearl River Delta. Chu Kong is the alternative transliteration of Pearl River.

Following the sale, formal registration of the change of company name to Sun Ferry Services Company Limited took effect on 7 January 2021 in Hong Kong's Companies Registry.

== See also ==
- New World First Bus, former sister company
- Sun Mobile, former sister brand, was known as New World Mobility
