= Fort Street, Hong Kong =

Street in Hong Kong

Coordinates: 22°17′23″N 114°11′51″E

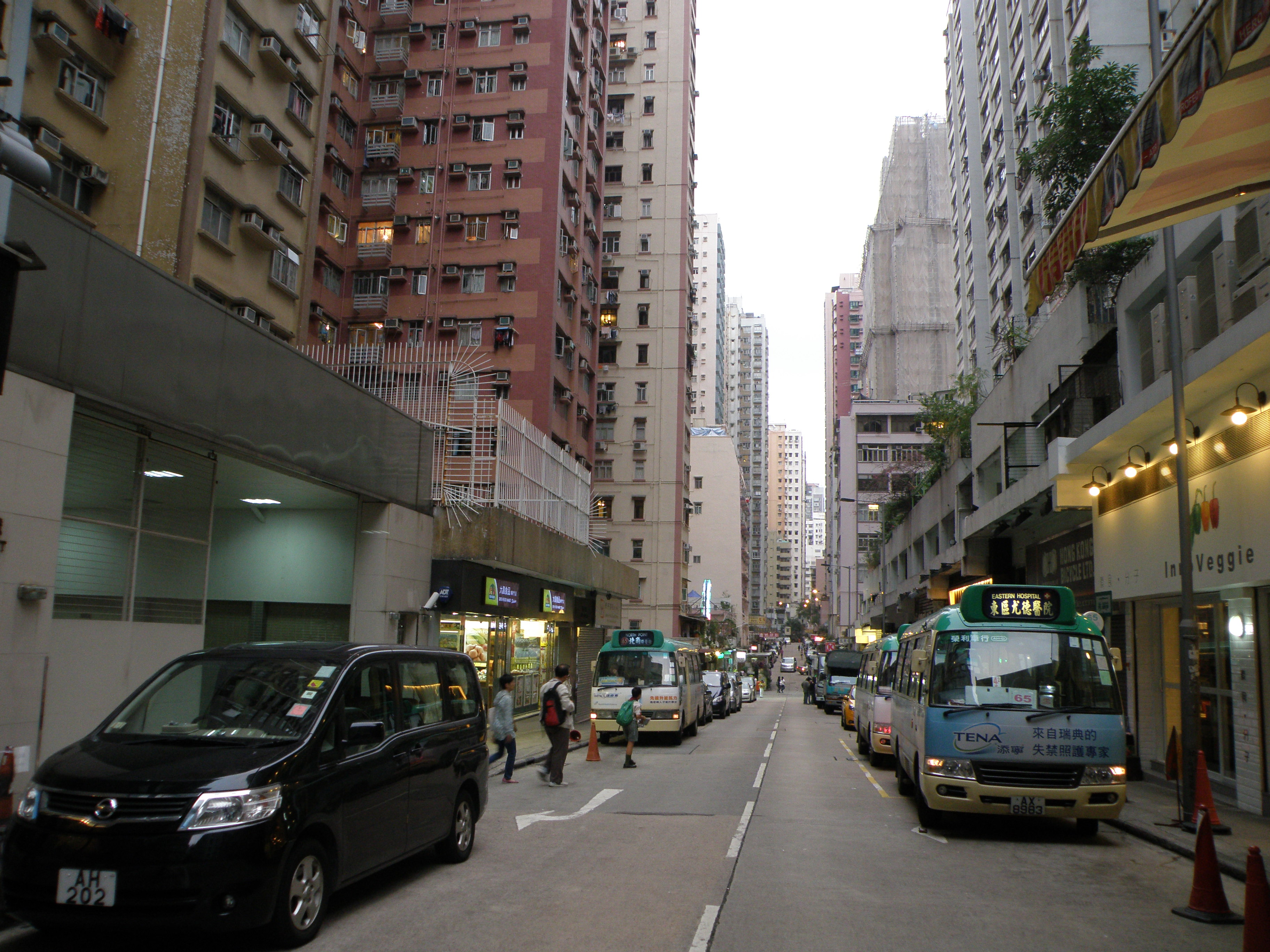
Western section of Fort Street.

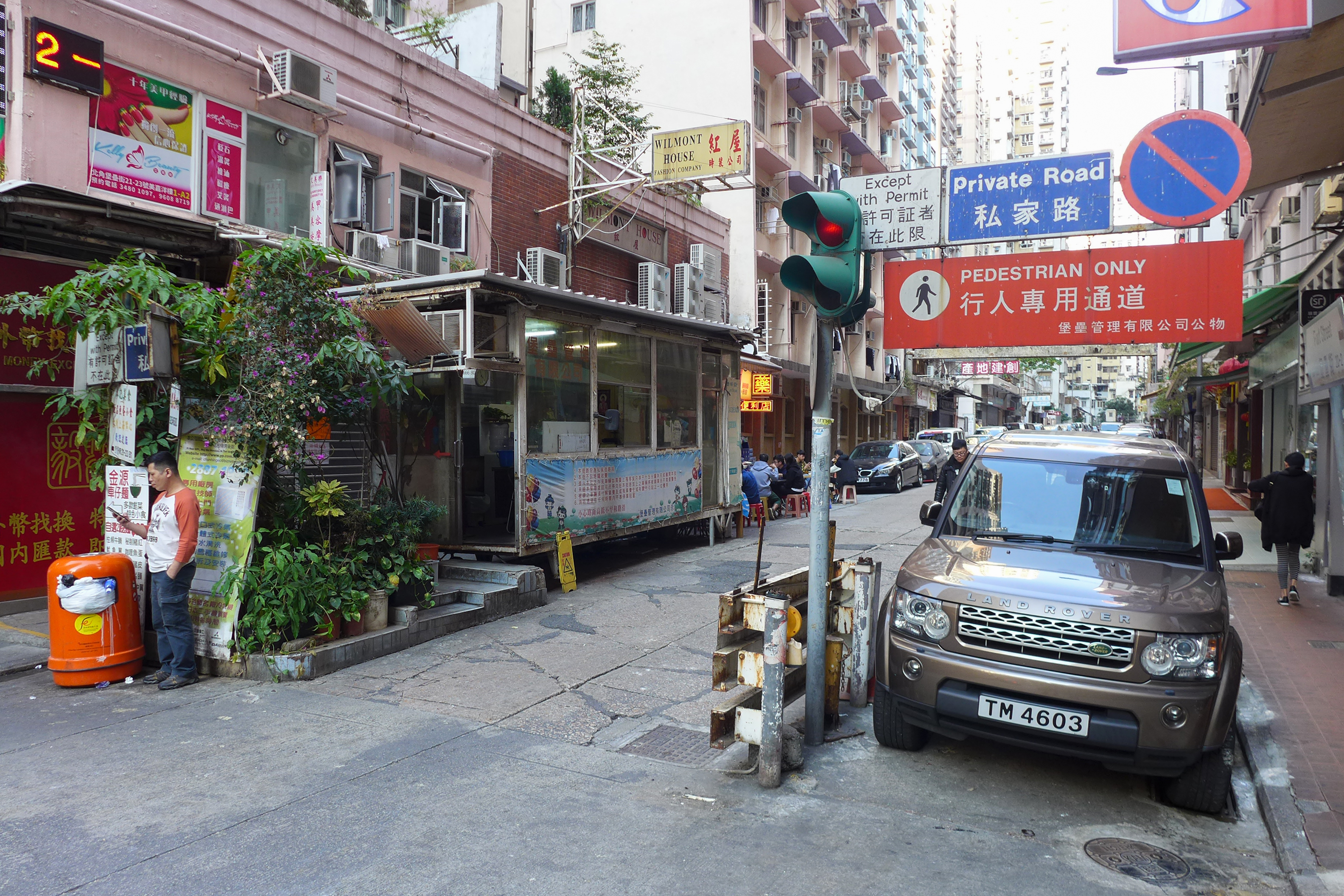
private section of Fort Street.

Fort Street is a street in North Point in Hong Kong. The street, primarily residential, runs from west to east, parallel to King's Road, at a higher elevation. It is the location of the terminus of Hong Kong Island Green Minibus Route 65.

The eastern half of the street is a private road. Drivers pay to the cashier's office at the corner of North View Street for parking their vehicles.

== Name ==
- The street was named after the nearby North Point Battery, established in 1879 and demolished in 1922.

== See also ==
- Fort Street (constituency)
- Fortress Hill
- List of streets and roads in Hong Kong
