= Trump on Show =

2019 Hong Kong Cantonese opera

- Cantonese Opera by Edward Li Kui-ming
- Official poster
- Native title: 粵劇特朗普
- Librettist: Edward Li Kui-ming
- Language: Cantonese
- Premiere: 12 April 2019; Sunbeam Theatre, Hong Kong

Trump on Show (Chinese: 粵劇特朗普) is a Hong Kong Cantonese opera created by Edward Li Kui-ming. The play is based on Donald Trump's presidency, and premiered at the Sunbeam Theatre on 12 April 2019. It revived twice on 7 October 2021 and 5 June 2025 respectively at Xiqu Centre.

== History ==
The opera is part two of Li's three-part series of opera Mao's Three Dream. Due to casting issue and taking inspiration of Nixon in China, Li settled on using Trump instead of Deng Xiaoping in the original plan in second part of the opera series. The opera includes some songs in English and Li mentions that the script is updated based on current event. Donald Trump in this opera is split into two characters, "特朗普" and "川普", based on two different translations of Trump's name that are used in different Sinophone regions.

The play was revived on 7 October 2021, at the Xiqu Centre, and served as the closing performance for Sunbeam Theatre in March 2025. On 6 June 2025, a revised iteration titled Trump, The Twins President premiered at the Xiqu Centre, with Volodymyr Zelenskyy and Elon Musk added to the cast. Tickets for the opera sold out instantly when they went on sale in November 2024, with the South China Morning Post noting that it was "the only Cantonese opera that attracted many young viewers to [Cantonese opera] theatre". Film critic Sek Kei described the opera as a "bizarre yet intriguing" production that skillfully blends humor and political commentary, reflecting significant societal changes since its initial performance while highlighting the complexities of both American and Chinese history; while Lai Kwok-wai, writing for P-articles, called the play a "cult production", rich in depth and interpretation, but ultimately lacks a nuanced cultural perspective despite its ambitious themes.
