= North Point =

Coordinates: 22°17′14″N 114°11′30″E

North Point 北角
- Mixed-used urban area
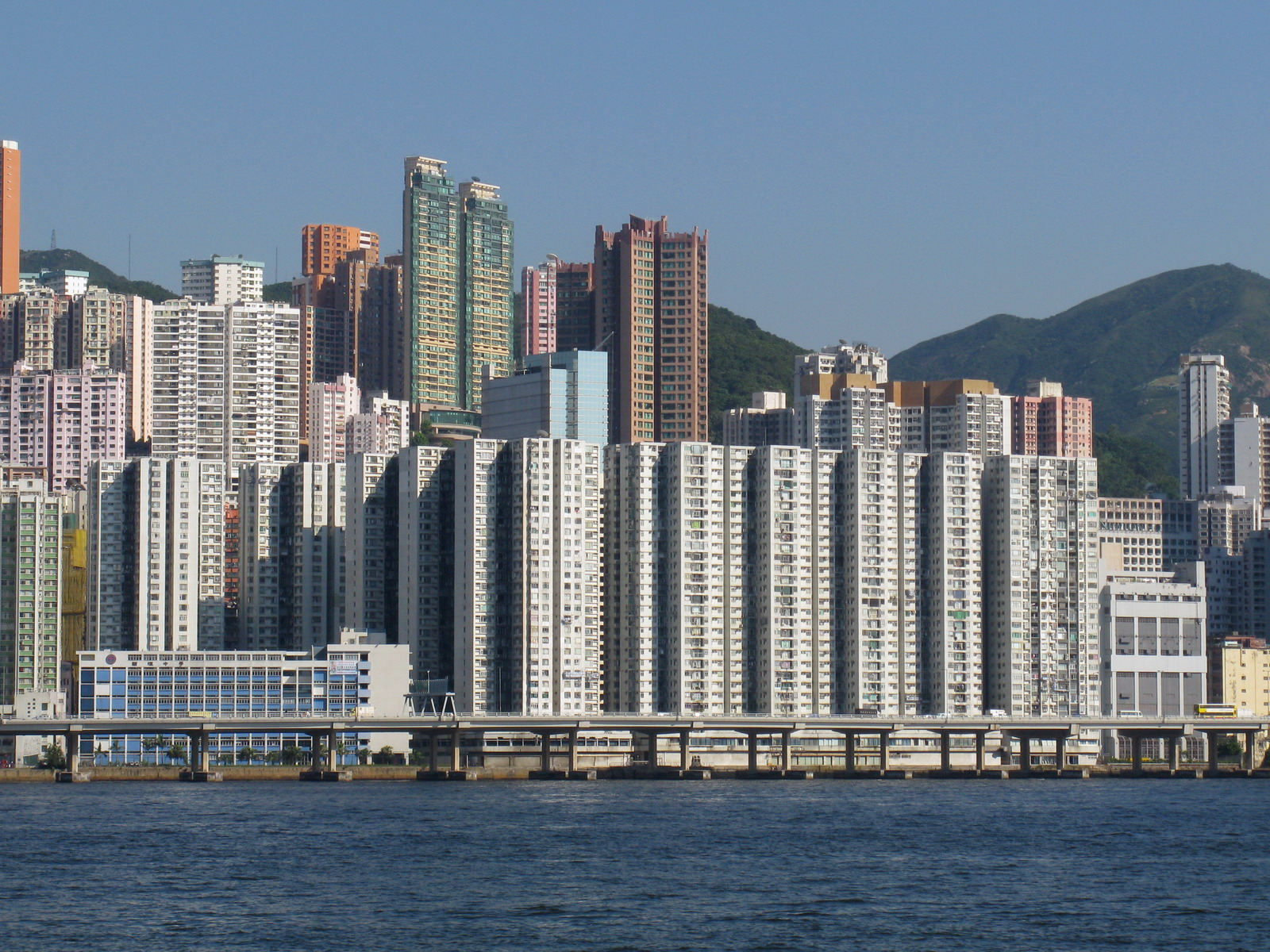
- Skyline of North Point in 2008
- Interactive map of North Point
- Country: People's Republic of China
- SAR: Hong Kong
- District: Eastern
- Named for: Northernmost point of Hong Kong

North Point
- Chinese: 北角
- Cantonese Yale: Bāk gok
- Jyutping: Bak1 gok3
Transcriptions
Standard Mandarin
- Hanyu Pinyin: Běijiǎo
Yue: Cantonese
- Yale Romanization: Bāk gok
- Jyutping: Bak1 gok3
- IPA: [pɐ́k kɔ̄ːk]
Southern Min
- Hokkien POJ: Pak-kak

North Point is a mixed-use urban area in the Eastern District of Hong Kong. Located in the northeastern part of Hong Kong Island, the area is named after a cape between Causeway Bay and Tsat Tsz Mui that projects towards Kowloon Bay.

== Location ==
North Point is bounded by Oil Street (油街) to the west and by Tin Chiu Street (電照街) to the east, by Victoria Harbour to the north and Braemar Hill to the southeast. Causeway Bay neighbourhood lies west of North Point, while the Tsat Tsz Mui is east of North Point.

== History ==
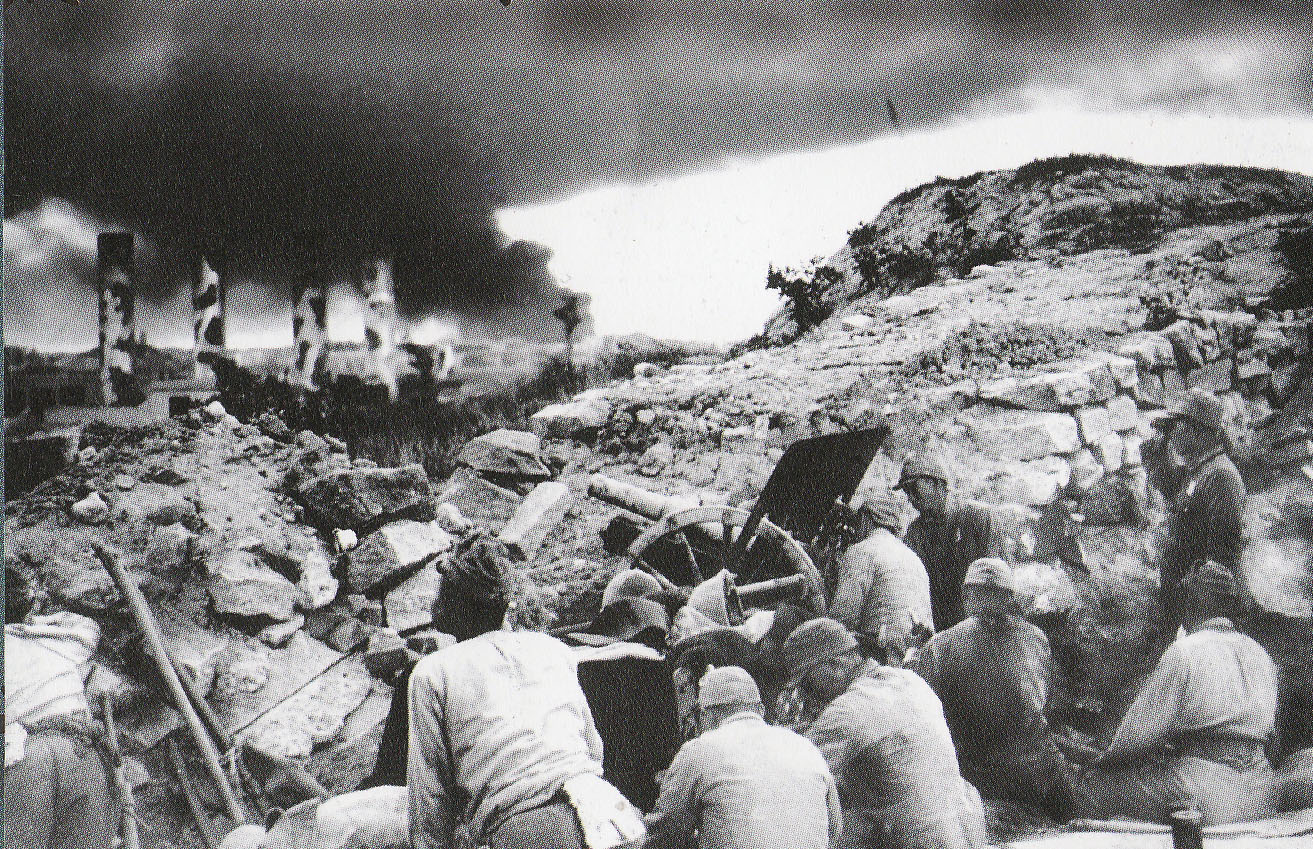
North Point Power Station during the Japanese invasion of Hong Kong in December 1941.

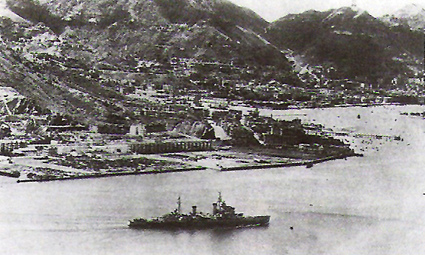
The British warship HMS Swiftsure entering the middle of Victoria Harbour via North Point in 1945

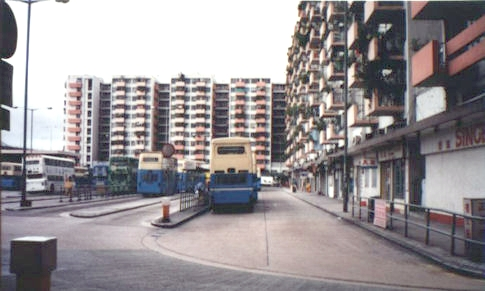
North Point Estate, demolished in 2003.

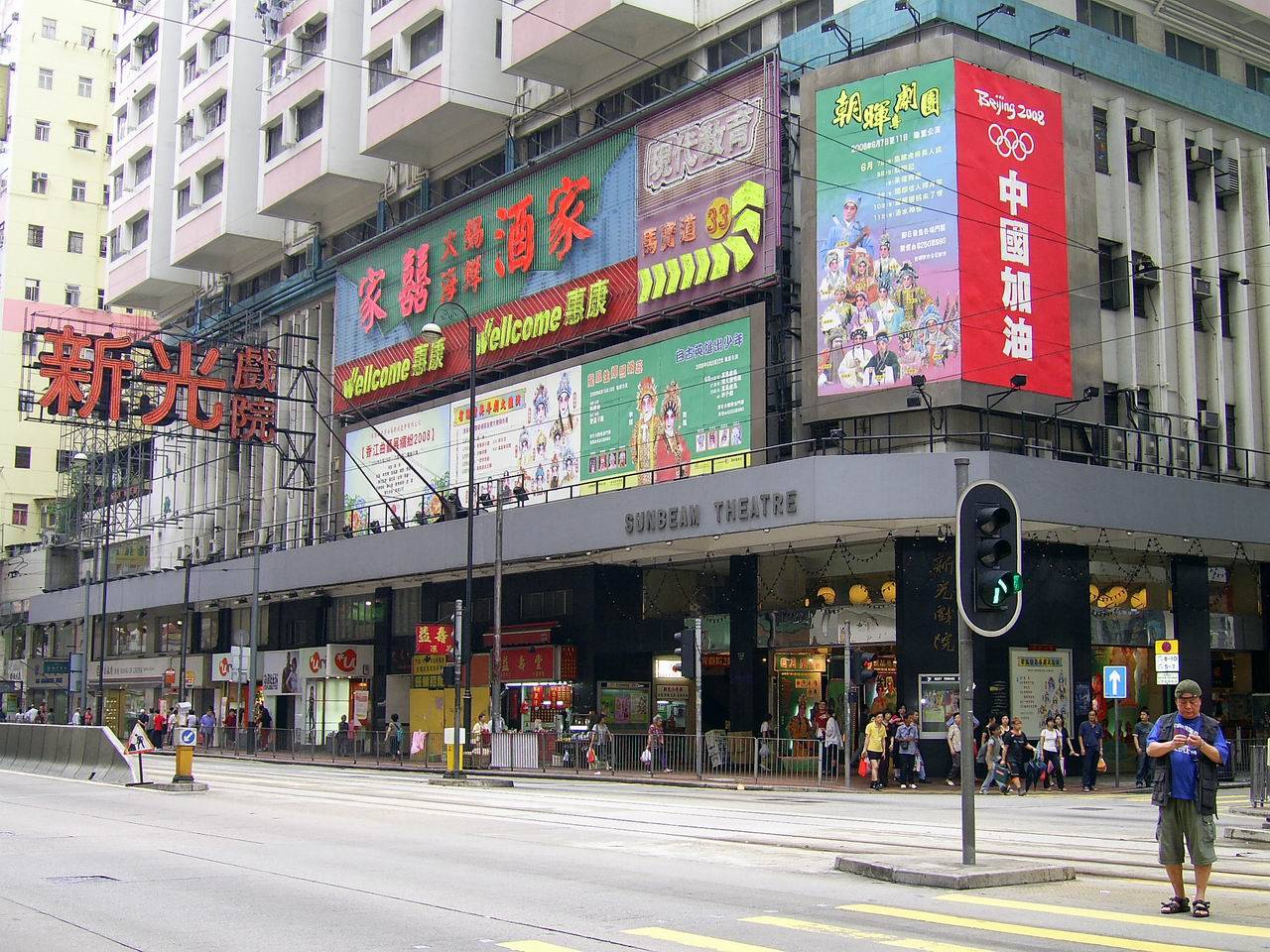
Sunbeam Theatre on King's Road.

The name 'North Point' was first used by Royal Engineer lieutenant Collinson (1821–1902) in 1845. Appearing in his official survey map to mark the northernmost point in Hong Kong Island.

Although the exact location of North Point was uninhabited before 1845, areas in around North Point have been inhabited since before the British arrived, with Tsat Tsz Mui Village considered as the oldest settlement in the vicinity, most likely established during the early 19th century.

=== Early development ===
During the early period of the Colonization of Hong Kong, North Point remained relatively barren when compared to other areas on Hong Kong Island such as the vibrant Sheung Wan and Central districts. This was mainly due to lack of flat land around north point.

The first developments in North Point centered around Shaukiwan Road (now Kings Road), such as The Metropole Hotel built in 1899, used until 1906, where the Metropole Building stands today. The hotel was described in an advertisement as a popular resort occupying a charming seaside location, with first class refreshments and dinners. It was later rebranded as Belle View Hotel from 1906 to 1916 (Late Metropole Hotel). and North Point Hotel from 1917 to 1919, which was easily accessible by a tram service every few minutes.

In 1919, the Hongkong Electric Company started operation of the territory's second power station at North Point. Being the first industrial development in North Point, it was built on reclaimed land off the coast. The two original steam turbines of the power station were sourced from Dawson City, Yukon Canada, and were a prized purchase that provided relatively cleaner energy than older generation turbines. Within 10 years the station had increased its generating power from 3,000 to 28,000 kilowatts, a testament to the rapidly expanding electricity needs of Hong Kong Island. Though in 1978 the power station is replaced by City Garden, the adjacent streets Electric Street, Power Street, and Tin Chong Street (lit. 'Power Plant Street') reference the historical power station.

During the 1920s, Ming Yuen (lit. 'Garden of Fame') Amusement Park was built on the hillsides of North Point, and became a popular entertainment venue on Hong Kong Island. The park was easily accessible by tram, there was also a bus service from Shek Tong Tsui. It featured a variety of programs such as circus performances, boxing matches, and open theaters, all of which are often well attended. It was also famous for organizing Dragon Boat racing events off the coast at North Point. Due to various reasons, including competition from the adjacent Lee Garden, the park closed down in the end of the 1930s. Today, Ming Yuen West Street retains the name of the park.

During the 1930s, the beaches of North Point became one of the most popular places for holding swimming gala in Hong Kong.

In 1938, the North Point Refugee Camp was built to accommodate the influx of refugees from the Mainland. The camp comprised 26 huts. Access to the camp was via Kam Hong Road and Marble Road. During World War II, the camp was renamed the North Point Camp, and used as a prisoner of war camp for captured Canadian soldiers during the Japanese occupation.

=== 'Little Shanghai', and 'Little Fujian' ===
During the Sino-Japanese War, and the Chinese Civil War, a large number of the rich and middle class from Shanghai such as the Jiangzhe people fled to Hong Kong to escape the turmoil of war, many of whom settled in North Point. In 1950, North Point became known as "Little Shanghai", since in the minds of many, it has already become the replacement for the surrendered Shanghai in China. With entertainment venues being ubiquitous in Shanghai, emigrant Merchants opened Entertainment venues in North Point, first being Ritz Ballroom, Swimming Pool, and Garden, then the amusement park containing Sky Room nightclub: Luna Park, and a series of theatres such as the now iconic State Theatre (Empire Theatre before 1959). The first wave of emigrants also introduced Shanghai-style restaurants, beauty parlours, tailors, and barbershops. As a result, both Fort Street and Tsat Tsz Mui Road became the epicenter of middle-class Shanghaiese life in Hong Kong. They also learned Cantonese and intermarried with people of other dialect groups. During the 1950s, North Point was the premiere place of residence for these emigrants, leading to a massive population boom; by the end of 1960, North Point was listed as the most densely populated place on earth by the Guinness Book of Records. The first school in Hong Kong to use Mandarin as the main medium of instruction, Kiangsu and Chekiang Primary School, was founded in 1953 in North Point by these early Shanghainese immigrants. Shanghai at the time was heavily associated with leftist movements; leftist-supported businesses in North Point such as the Sunbeam Theatre (which now showcases Cantonese Opera), are a legacy of their influence.

The second group that moved to North Point were the Hokkien Fujianese, who were mostly displaced by political events in China but then soon mostly moved to countries in Southeast Asia, such as the Philippines and Indonesia. During the late 1960s North Point became known as "Little Fujian". Small Indonesian specialist grocery shops selling coffee, coconuts, and bumbu are some of the remaining traces of their identity. The Fujianese set up Grocery shops on Chun Yeung Street, which offer a variety of traditional Fujianese foods, such as "misua", "tokwa", "tikoy", "lumpia" and "green bean cake", all of which are also staples of Chinese Filipino cuisine in the Philippines. The Fujianese also rented apartments to set up apartment-temples in North Point to worship Pan-Chinese Deities such as Gwan Yin, and the Fujianese deity Sheng Gung (Kong Tek Chun Ong, 廣澤尊王). Many of these apartment-temples were established by Monks and Nuns who escaped Fujian when the Chinese Cultural Revolution attacked old religious organizations.

== Culture ==
After Cantonese, Hokkien is the most widely spoken language in North Point. Many Hokkien associations (閩南同鄉會) are based in North Point to bring people from the same towns or villages together. North Point is also home to several Southern-Min-speaking churches serving the Hokkien Christians.

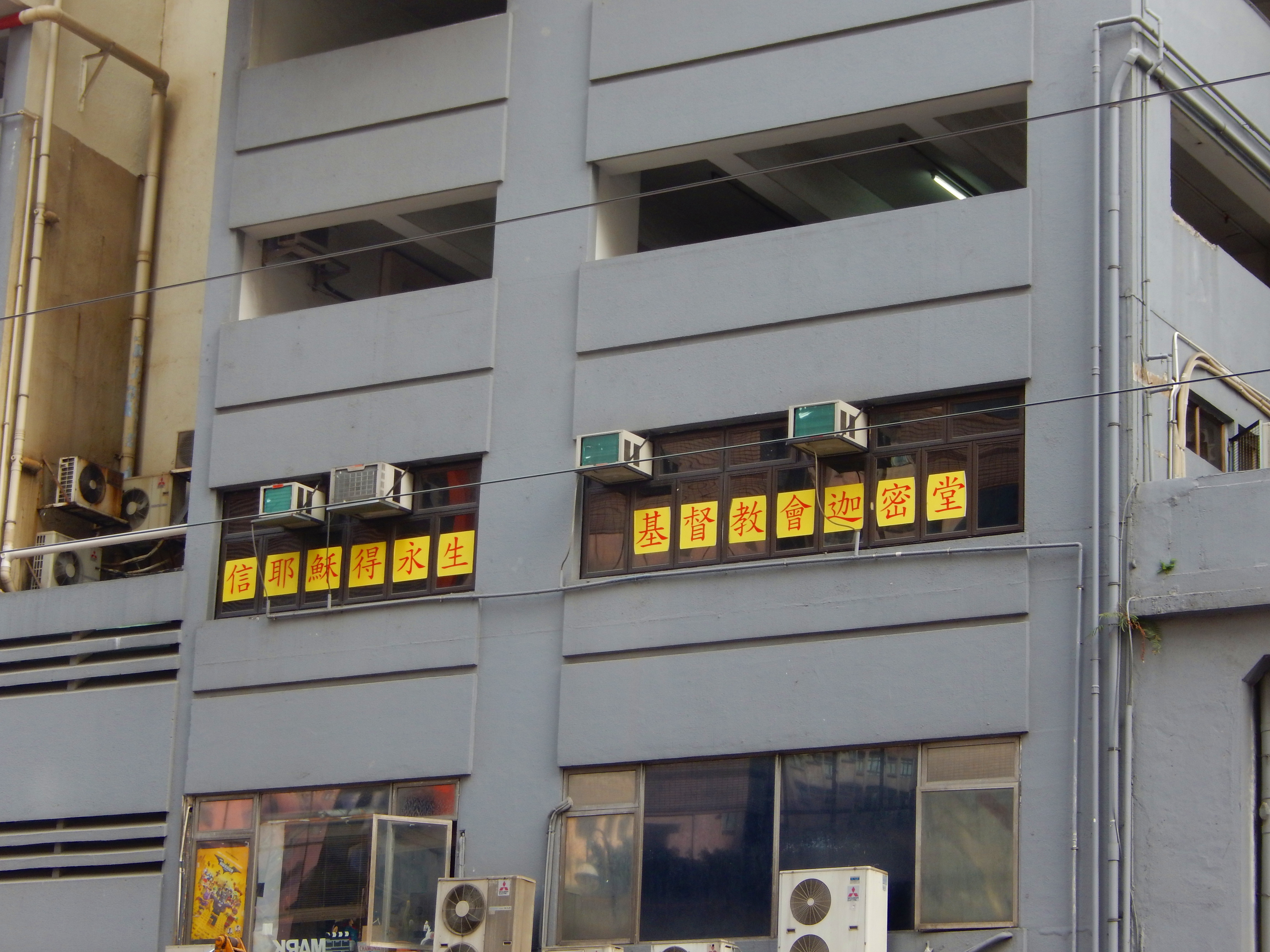
One of the Hokkien-speaking churches in North Point.

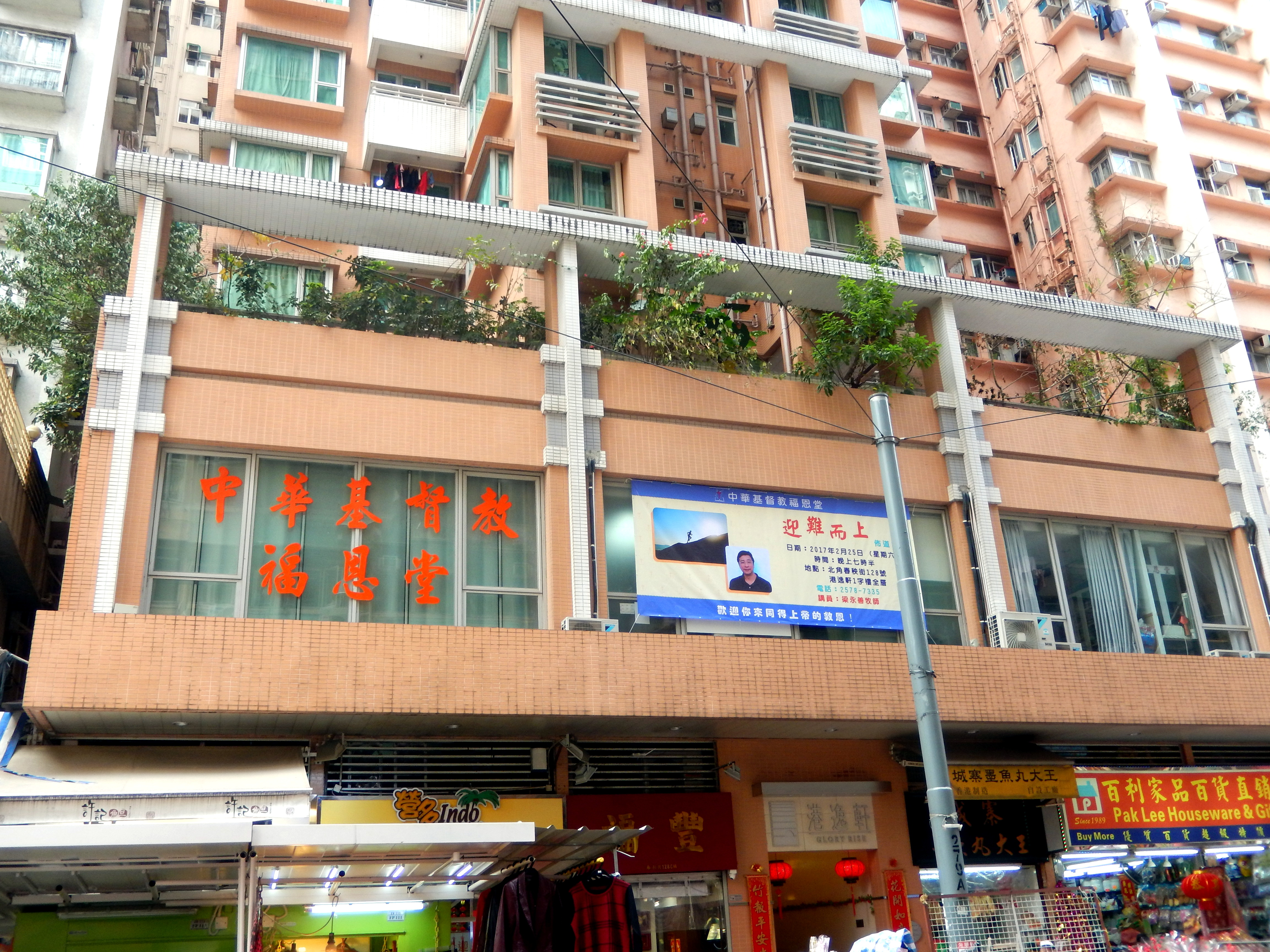
Another Hokkien-speaking church in North Point.

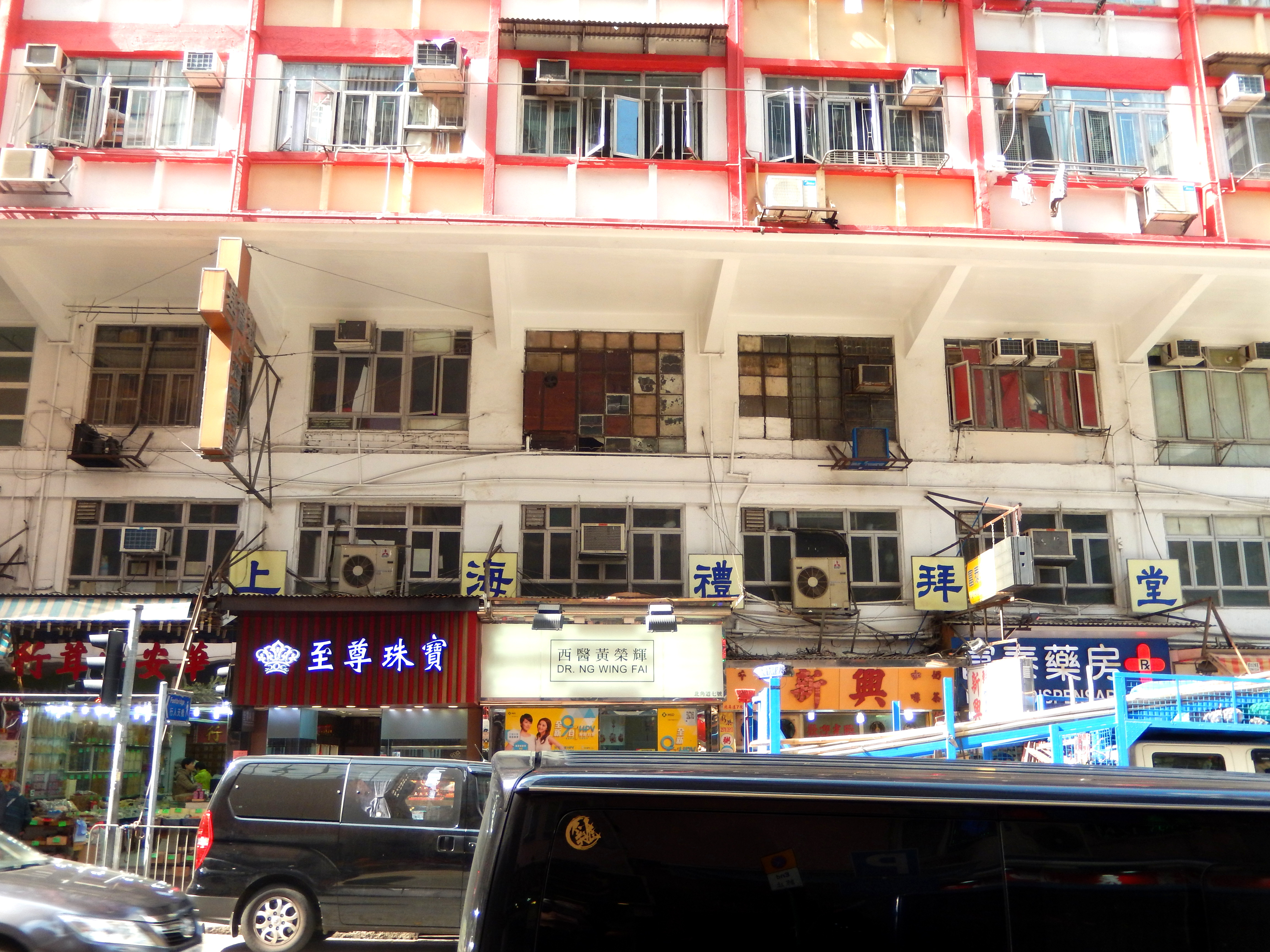
Christian Shanghai Church on North Point Road.

Today, North Point comprises a mix of new luxury developments and older Chinese buildings.

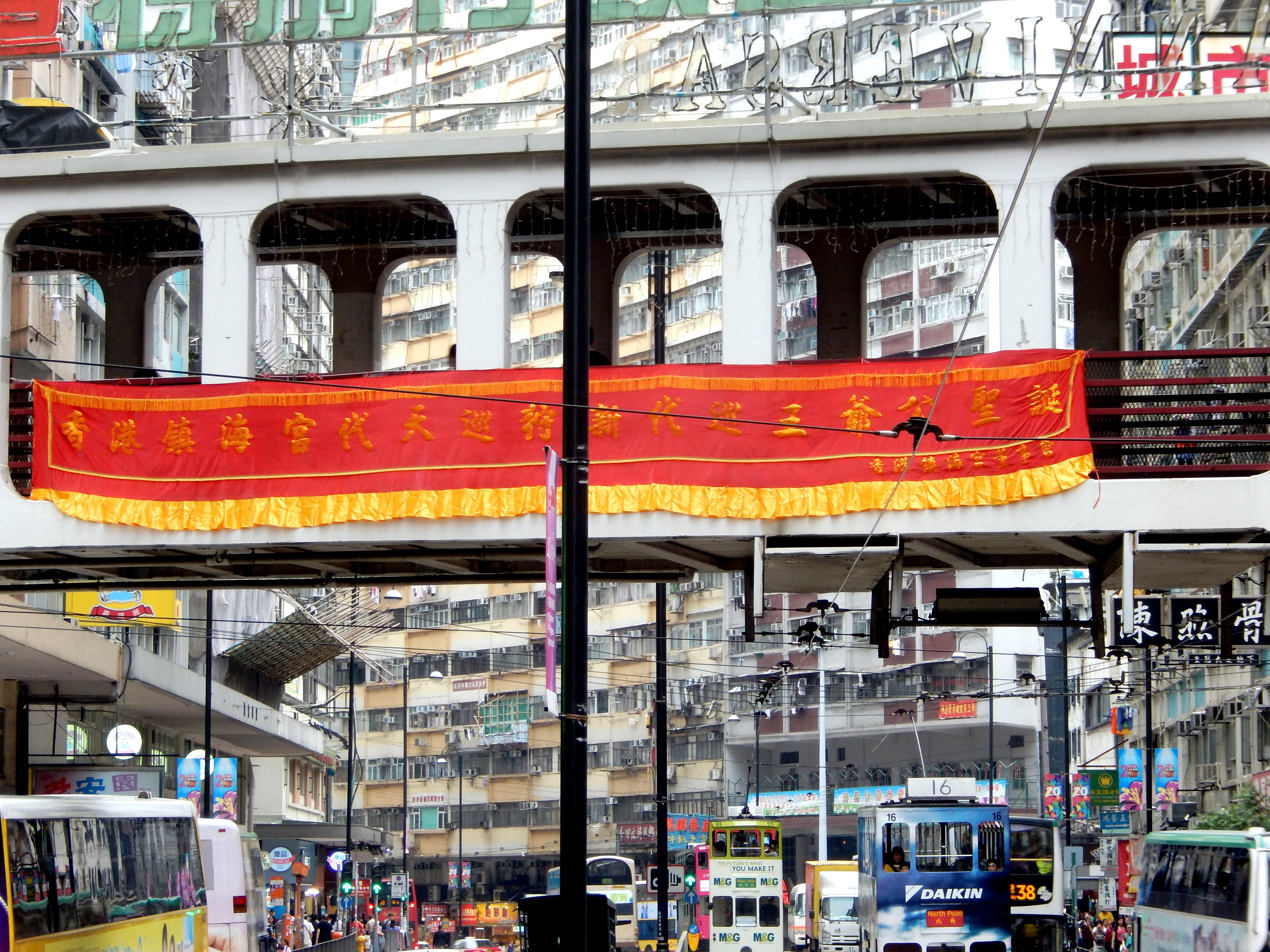
Banner of Teng Hai Temple on North Point Road Footbridge. The temple originates in Jinjiang, Fujian.

== Economy ==
The head office of Sino United Publishing is in the S U P Tower (合出版大廈) in North Point.

== Housing ==
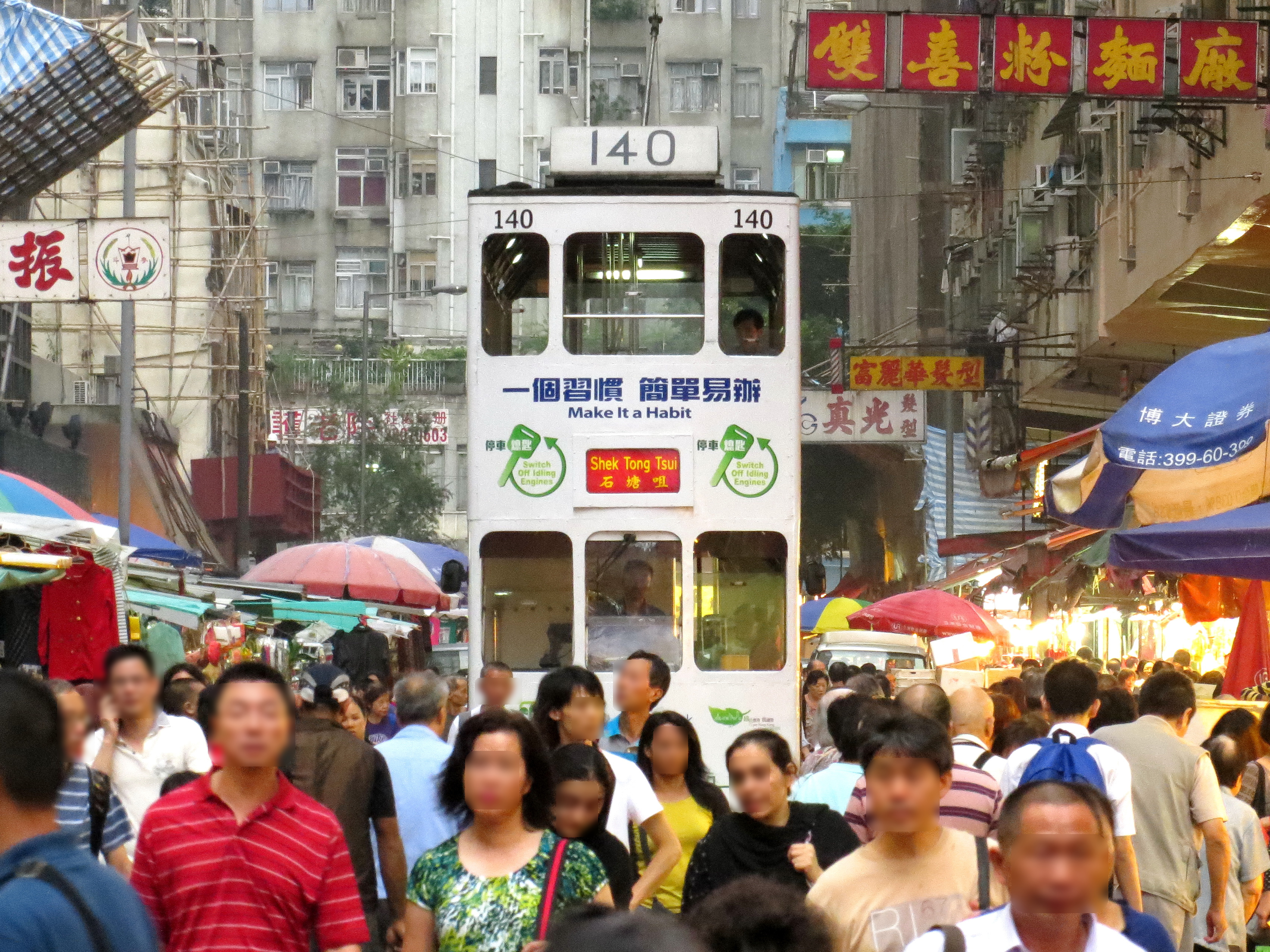
The eastbound Hong Kong Tramways line runs through Chun Yeung Street, a busy marketplace.

City Garden, built from 1983 to 1986, is a private housing estate consisting of 14 blocks, each 28 storeys tall. Part of the site was occupied North Point Power Station before 1983.

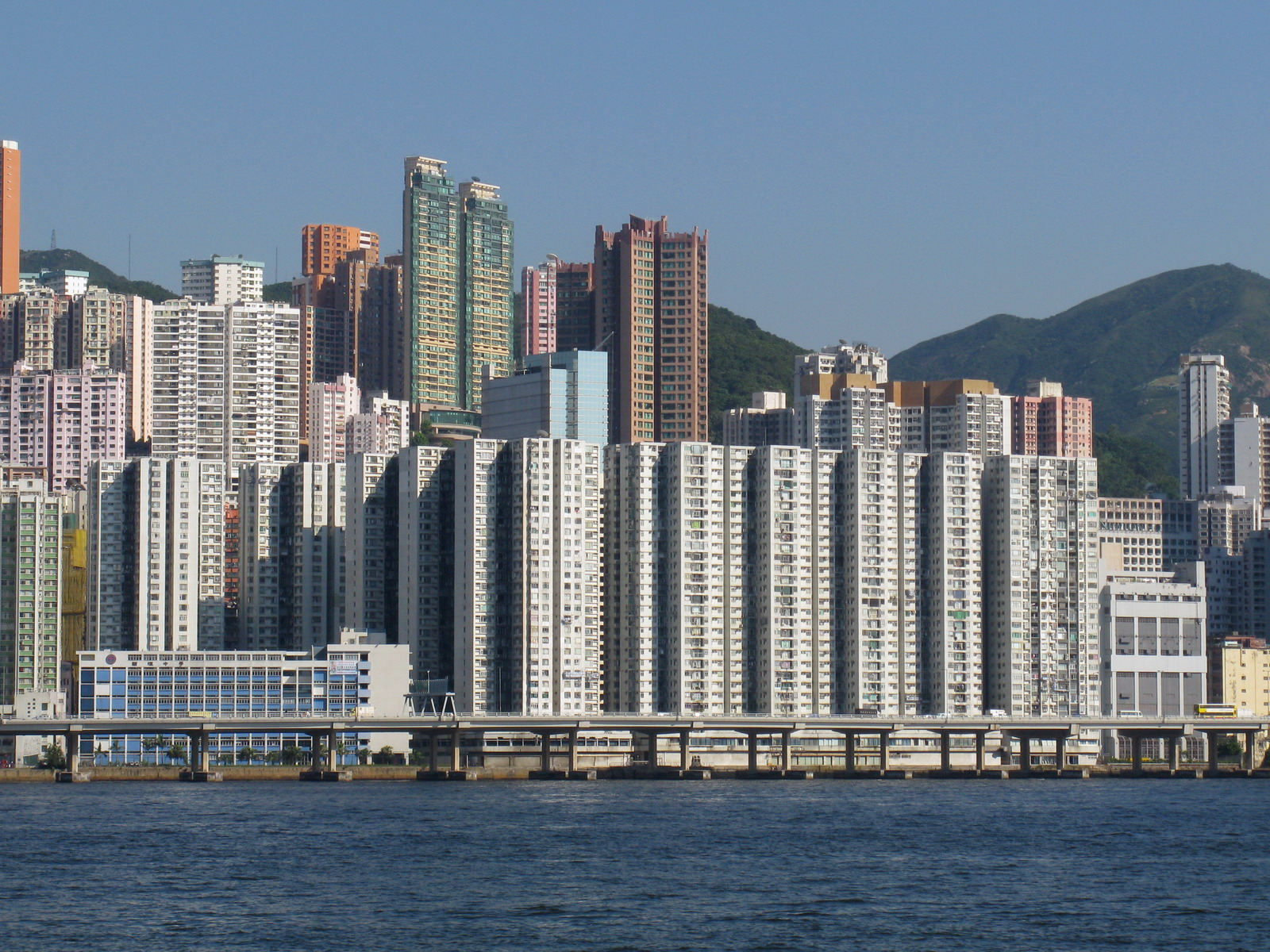
View of City Garden and North Point area from Victoria Harbour, with elevated Island Eastern Corridor causeway in foreground.

North Point Estate, which stood next to the North Point Ferry Pier, was demolished in 2003.

== Education ==
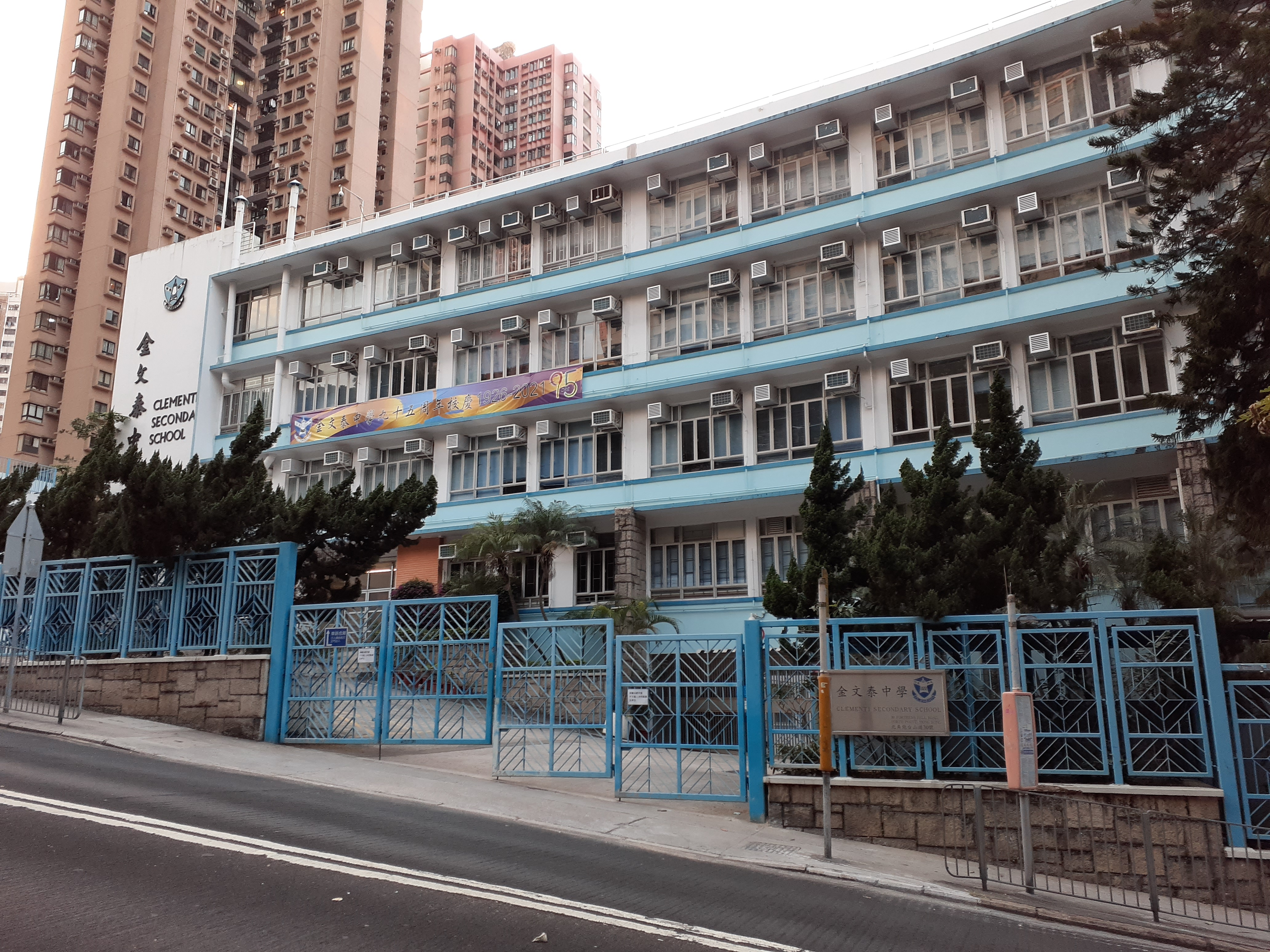
Clementi Secondary School

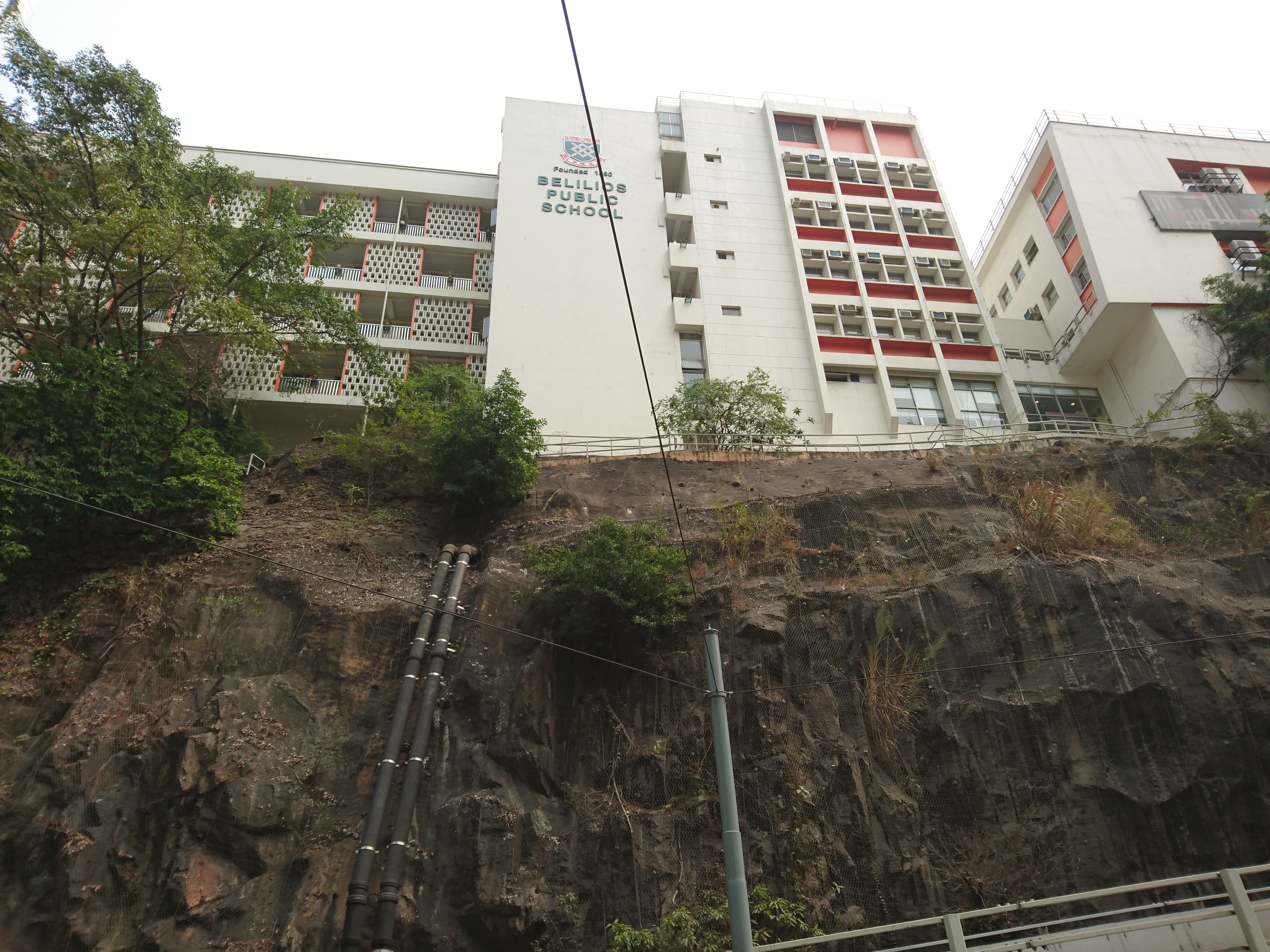
Belilios Public School

There are three government primary schools in North Point. Located at 888 King's Road, the North Point Government Primary School (NPGPS) opened in 1954. The North Point Island Place Primary and Kindergarten School is located on Tanner Road and is in the Island Place Estate. The North Point Government Primary School (Cloud View Road) abbreviated as NPCVR, also opened in 1954, is located at 22 Cloud View Road. All three schools are whole-day, co-ed and have nominated secondary school status with Shau Kei Wan GSS, Shau Kei Wan East GSS and Clementi Secondary School.

Belilios Public School, a government secondary school for girls, is in North Point.

The Chinese International School is located on Hau Yuen Path in Braemar Hill and is a private, co-educational school providing education to students from Reception to Year 13. Established in 1983, the school has a diverse student body with over 30 nationalities represented. Secondary school students pursue the IB Primary Years Programme before moving on to the IB Diploma.

North Point is in Primary One Admission (POA) School Net 14. Within the school net are multiple aided schools (operated independently but funded with government money) and North Point Government Primary School (北角官立小學).

Former schools

- Java Road Government Primary School (渣華道官立小學)
- The Hong Kong Japanese School's Secondary Section was formerly on Braemar Hill in North Point. In April 2018 the junior high school moved to the Happy Valley campus.

Hong Kong Public Libraries operates the North Point Public Library in the North Point Market Building, and the Electric Road Public Library in the Electric Road Municipal Services Building.

== Transport ==
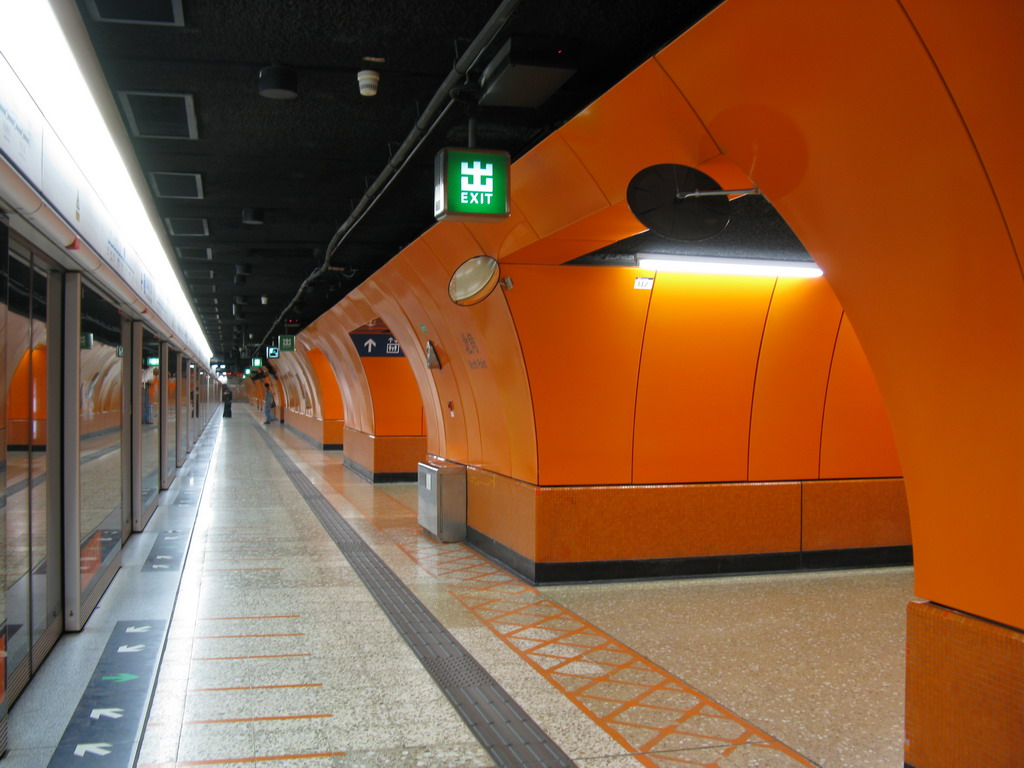
Island line platform of North Point station.

MTR

North Point is served by the Island line and the Tseung Kwan O line of the MTR rapid transit railway system. North Point station is the terminus of the Tseung Kwan O line.

Tramway

North Point is also served by Hong Kong Tramways, of which it is one of the seven terminal points.

Bus

Kowloon Motor Bus and Citybus have routes through North Point. North Point is also served by public light buses.

Ferry

At North Point Ferry Pier, Sun Ferry operates routes to Hung Hom, and Kowloon City . While Fortune Ferry operates route to Kwun Tong route, and Kai Tak. In the past. these routes were operated by Hongkong and Yaumati Ferry.

As part of Hong Kong Ferry, Hongkong and Yaumati Ferry operates a North Point/Kwun Tong Licensed Dangerous Goods Vehicular Ferry Service. It also operates the sightseeing service Harbour Cruise Bauhinia on public holidays.

During the annual Tin Hau Festival, special ferries operate from North Point Ferry Pier to Joss House Bay.

Thoroughfares

There is one highway, Island Eastern Corridor, serving North Point; it runs along the waterfront of the area.

Streets in North Point include:

- Boat Street
- Cheung Hong Street
- Ching Wah Street
- Chun Yeung Street
- City Garden Road
- Comfort Terrace
- Electric Road
- Fort Street
- Fortress Hill Road
- Hei Wo Street
- Java Road
- Kai Yuen Street
- Kam Hong Street
- Kam Ping Street
- Kin Wah Street
- King's Road (partially)
- Marble Road
- Ming Yuen Western Street
- North Point Estate Lane
- North Point Road
- North View Street
- Oil Street
- Peacock Road
- Power Street
- Shu Kuk Street
- Tanner Road
- Tin Chiu Street
- Tin Chong Street
- Tin Hau Temple Road (天后廟道) (partially)
- Tong Shui Road
- Tsat Tsz Mui Road
- Wharf Road (和富道)
- Yuet Tuen Street

== See also ==
- List of places in Hong Kong
- State Theatre (Hong Kong)
- Fujianese organized crime

== Bibliography ==
- "History of North Point", in Heritage Impact Assessment on the Former Clubhouse of Royal Hong Kong Yacht Club at 12 Oil Street Vol 1 Part 1, pp. 9–70
- Guldin, Gregory E. (1977). ""Little Fujian (Fukien)": Sub-Neighborhood and Community in North Point, Hong Kong". Journal of the Hong Kong Branch of the Royal Asiatic Society. 17: 113–114. JSTOR 23889582.
- Pang, Amy (March 2019). Chan, Tara (ed.). 北角香港: 口述歷史 [North Point, Hong Kong: Oral History]. Translated by Tse, Winnie. Hong Kong: The Conservancy Association Center for Heritage. ISBN 9789881422477.
- Wordie, Jason (2002). Streets: Exploring Hong Kong Island. Hong Kong University Press. ISBN 962-209-563-1.
