= Sunbeam Theatre =

Theatre and opera house in Hong Kong

Coordinates: 22.291332°N 114.200051°E

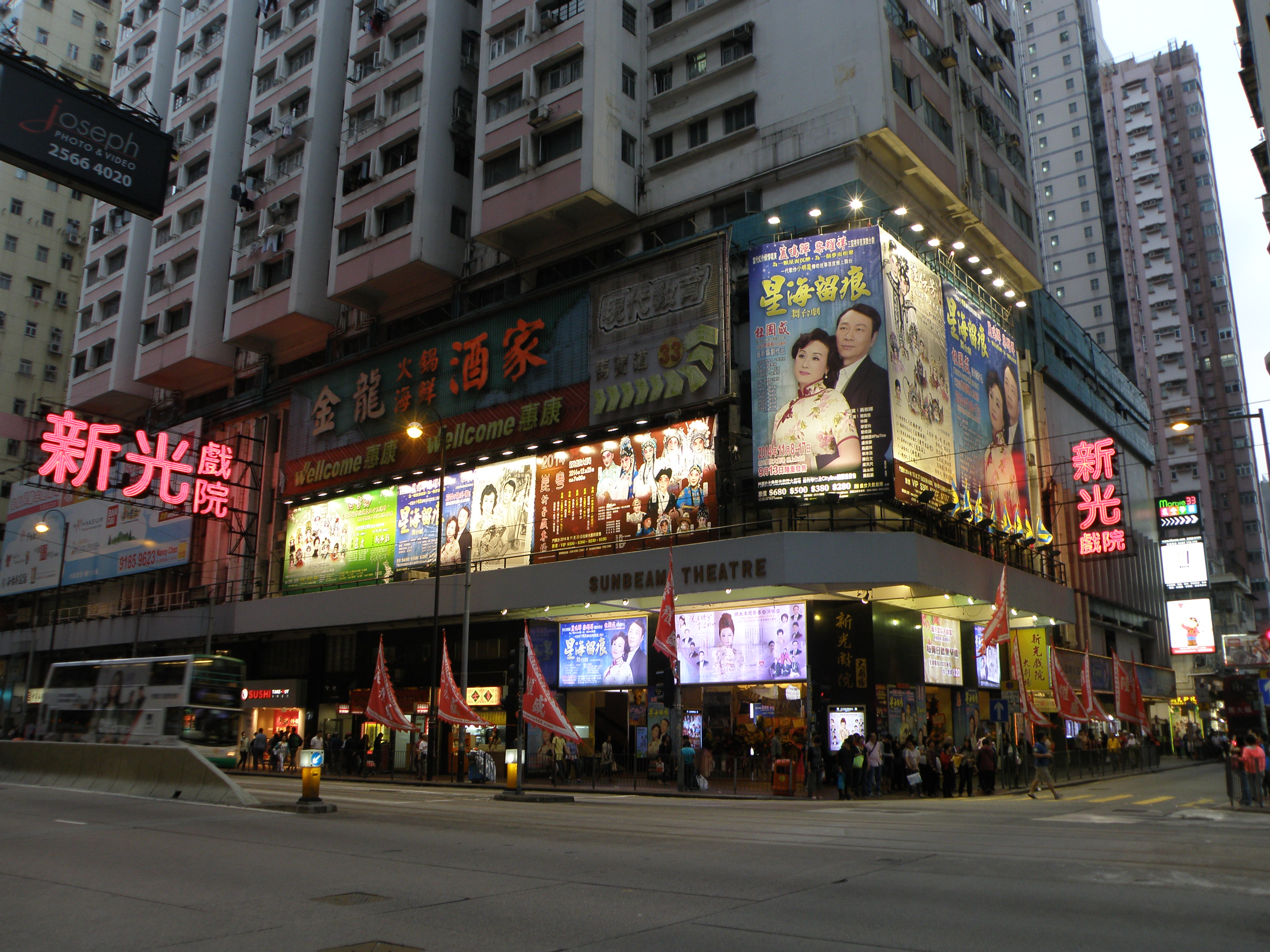
Sunbeam Theatre on King's Road

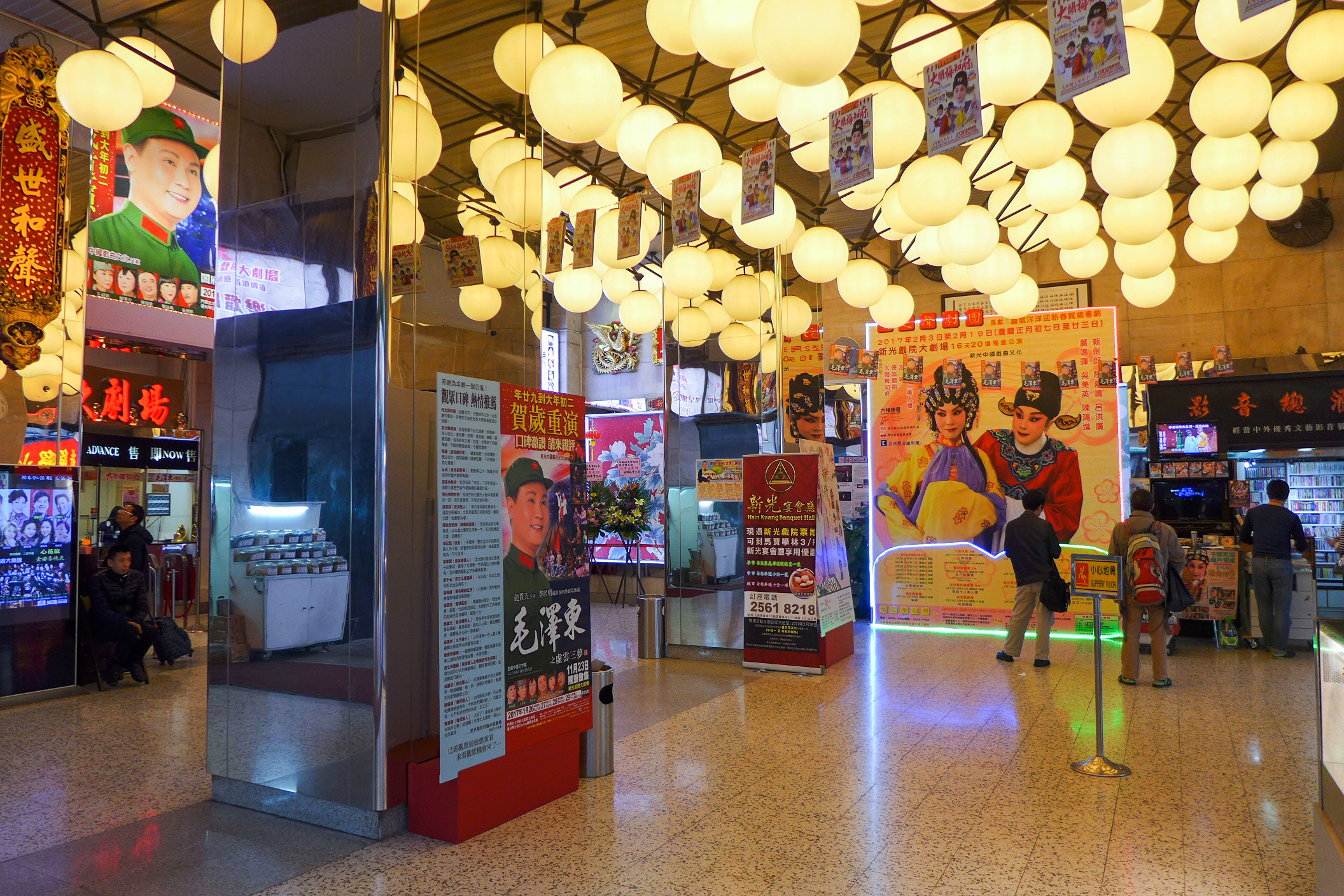
Lobby of Sunbeam Theatre

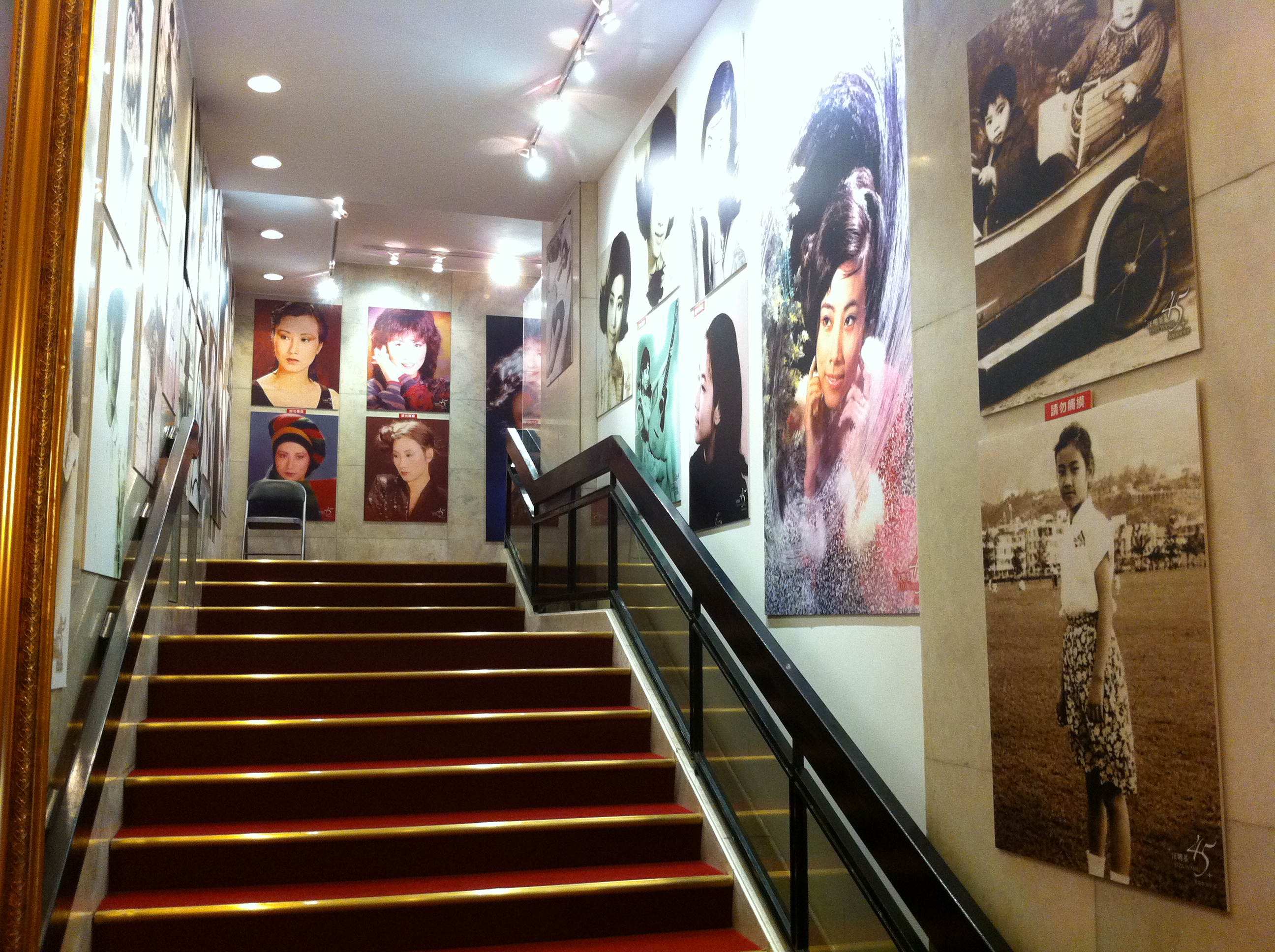
Liza Wang Exhibition in 2012

Sunbeam Theatre (Chinese: 新光戲院) is a landmark theatre in Hong Kong showcasing Cantonese opera. It is located at 423 King's Road, North Point, near the intersection with Shu Kuk Street.

== History ==
In the 1950s, many of the Shanghainese emigrants moved from Shanghai to Hong Kong and settled in the North Point area. At the time Shanghai was known for its leftist revolutions, and many of the leftist supported businesses relocated to North Point. Aside from the China Products Department stores, the Sunbeam Theatre is one of the landmark theatres to have been started by that same group of emigrants. It was established by "Hua Chang Enterprises Ltd" in 1972. Later it was turned over to "Silver Entertainment Ltd" on 1 September 1980 to Henry Fok, chairman of "Sunbeam Entertainment". In 1988, Yao-Hung, chairman of the board of "Hong Kong United Arts Entertainment Company Ltd" took over its operation.

In 1989, the theatre was divided into two auditoriums, with the smaller one converted from the balcony for showing films, while the larger one converted from the stalls for stage performances.

In 1993, Chung Sun Sing Opera Troupe had a season of 38 consecutive full-house shows at the Sunbeam Theatre, winning the theatre the title of "Hong Kong's Grand Palace for Cantonese Opera".

The 80,000-square-foot (7,400 m^{2}) property was acquired by Francis Law Sau-fai (羅守輝) in 2003 for HK$162 million. There were plans to transform it into a shopping mall.

In March 2007, the smaller auditorium was rebuilt as a multi-purpose theatre for stage performances.

The lease of the theatre, ended in February 2009. After much public debate about the possible closure of the theatre and discussions about alternative options, the lease with the operator of the Theatre was renewed for three years, while the landlord had made clear his plan to redevelop the theatre three years later. At the same time, the Government was planning to provide HK$100,000 each month, through the Arts Development Council, to subsidise the rental of the Theatre.

In 2012, an arrangement was made by a mystery person named Mr. Leung to have landlord Francis Law Sau-fai meet with opera playwright Li Kui-ming (李居明) to talk about the rent situation. Law accepted the rent at a cost of HK$1 million a month. This allowed the property to stay a Cantonese opera theatre. The mystery man was later said to be 2012 chief executive election candidate Leung Chun-ying.

In August 2023, the building that housed Sunbeam Theatre went up for sale. It was eventually bought by Island Evangelical Community Church for $750 million HKD. It was announced that the theatre will close on 3 March 2025 to undergo renovations. Trump on Show was one of the closing performances.

== Revitalization Project ==
The Island Evangelical Community Church is undertaking a revitalization project for the property that includes the Sunbeam Theatre and the ground through sixth floors of Kiu Fai Mansion. In honoring the historical significance of the Sunbeam Theatre, the church aims to create a multi-purpose space that will include ministry activity areas, leadership training facilities, and community event spaces. Efforts will also be made to preserve artifacts and memories associated with the theatre.

The revitalization will involve structural reinforcements to fully comply with current safety codes. Enhancements, such as elevators and wheelchair access ramps, will be installed to ensure accessibility. Upon reopening, the theatre will be available again for booked performances, allowing it to continue its legacy as a vibrant venue for the arts. The project is expected to be completed in early 2028.
