= Trams in Hong Kong =

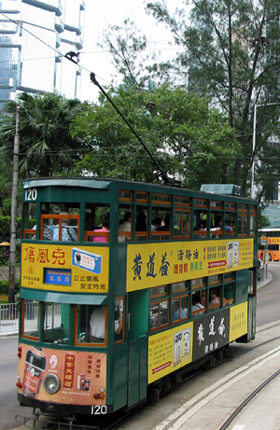
A double-decker tram in Hong Kong

Trams in Hong Kong include the Hong Kong Tramways, the Peak Tram (a funicular railway which is always referred to as a tram) and the Light Rail Transit (MTR Light Rail, LRT; formerly KCR Light Rail).

== History ==
A bill, the Tramways Bill 1881, was introduced in the legislature of the colony in 1881, with the motion for its first reading moved by Francis Bulkeley Johnson and seconded by Ng Choy. It called for the construction along the northern shore of the city and to the peak a tramway "to be moved by animal, steam or any mechanical power, for the carriage of passengers, their belongings, whether luggage, goods or passengers' animals, provided that they did not exceed 16 lb. in weight or one cubic foot in volume". One of the six proposed lines, "tramway no. 6", was built as the Peak Tram, along with the Peak Tram Regulations made by the Governor in Council under the Tramways Ordinance 1883 on 16 December 1889. The other five lines become the model for the 1904 tramways, although not following exactly the same route, with another, separate ordinance, the Hongkong Tramway Ordinance 1902.

== The systems ==
=== Peak Tram ===
The Peak Tram, opened in 1888, is a funicular railway.

=== Hong Kong Tramways ===
In service since 1904, the Hong Kong Tramways is a traditional British Isles-style double-decker tramway with street running, along the north shore of Hong Kong Island.

=== MTR Light Rail ===
Since 1988, the MTR Light Rail system (then called Light Rail Transit (LRT); part of the KCR network and operated by the KCR Corporation until 2008) has served in the northwest New Territories.

== Track gauge and voltage ==
- Peak Tram: 1,524 mm (5 ft) five-foot gauge, n/a (funicular)
- Hong Kong Tramways: 1,067 mm (3 ft 6 in), 550 V DC (overhead line, collected by a single trolley pole)
- MTR Light Rail: 1,435 mm (4 ft 8 1/2 in) standard gauge, 750 V DC (overhead line)

== Services ==
- Peak Tram: One single line (1888)
- Hong Kong Tramways (1904):
  - Shau Kei Wan ↔ Western Market
  - Shau Kei Wan ↔ Happy Valley
  - North Point ↔ Witty Street
  - Causeway Bay ↔ Witty Street
  - Happy Valley ↔ Kennedy Town
  - Shau Kei Wan ↔ Kennedy Town
  - Western Market ↔ Kennedy Town
  - Causeway Bay ↔ Kennedy Town
- Light Rail (1988)
  - 5xx (1988)
  - 6xx (1988)
  - 7xx (1993)

== See also ==
- Rail transport in Hong Kong § Trams and funiculars
