= Hongkong and Yaumati Ferry =

Hong Kong ferry and property company

The Hongkong and Yaumati Ferry Co. Ltd.
- Hongkong and Yaumati Ferry company logo

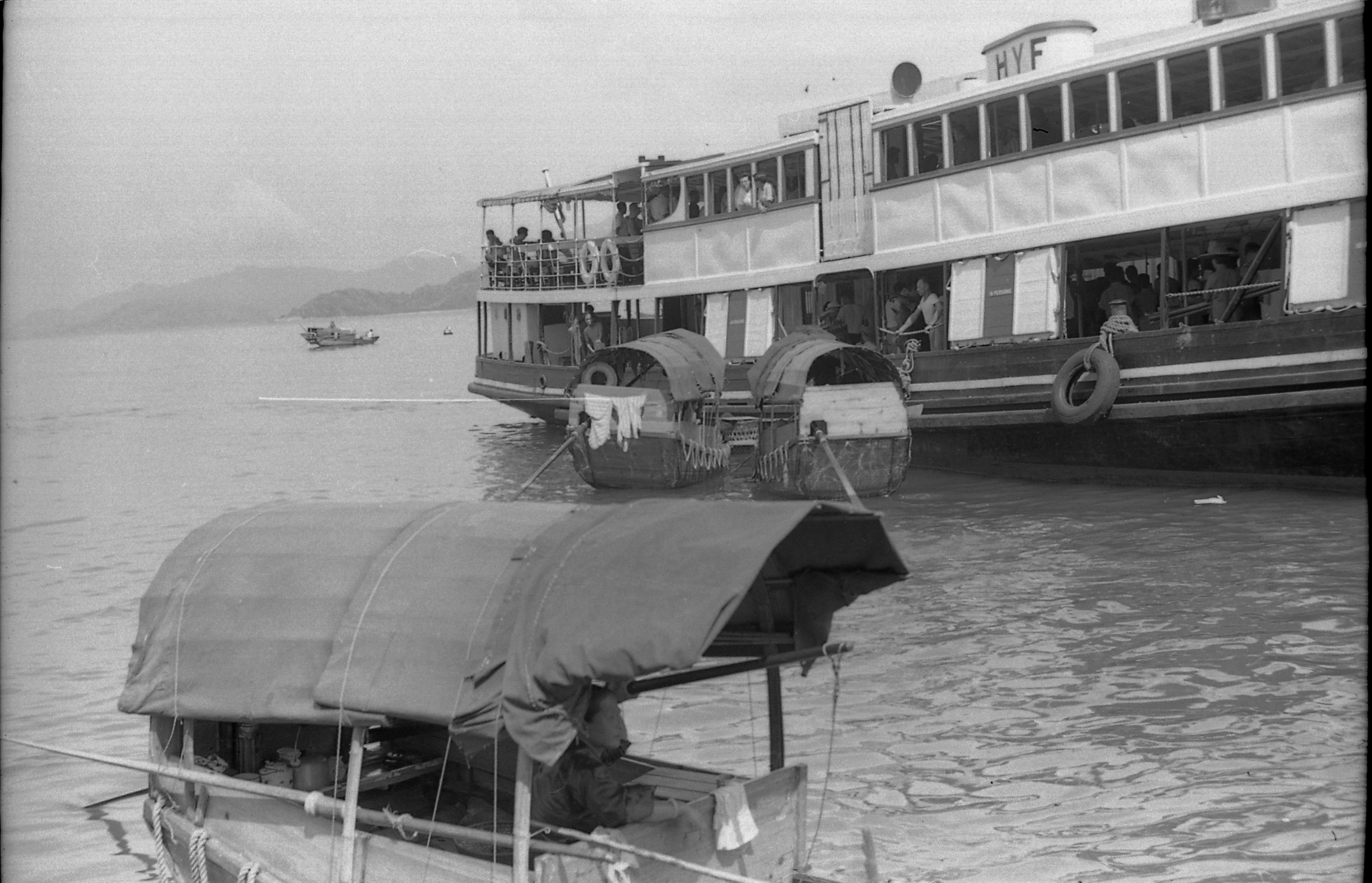
- A HYF ferry in the 1960s (backside of the photo)
- Type: subsidiary
- Industry: Transport
- Founded: 1897; 129 years ago
- Headquarters: Tsing Yi, Hong Kong
- Key people: Colin Lam Ko Yin, Chairman; Dr David Ho, General Manager
- Products: Ferry, Property
- Number of employees: 400
- Parent: Hong Kong Ferry (Holdings) Company Limited (Henderson Land Development's associate company)

Chinese name
- Traditional Chinese: 香港油蔴地小輪有限公司
- Simplified Chinese: 香港油麻地小轮有限公司
Transcriptions
Standard Mandarin
- Hanyu Pinyin: Xiānggǎng Yóumádì Xiǎolún Yǒuxiàngōngsī
Yue: Cantonese
- Yale Romanization: Hēung góng yàuh màh deih síu lèuhn yáuh haahn gūng sī
- Jyutping: Hoeng1 gong2 jau4 maa4 dei6 siu2 leon4 jau5 haan6 gung1 si1

Yaumati Ferry
- Traditional Chinese: 油蔴地小輪
- Simplified Chinese: 油麻地小轮
Transcriptions
Standard Mandarin
- Hanyu Pinyin: Yóumádì Xiǎolún
Yue: Cantonese
- Yale Romanization: Yàuh màh deih síu lèuhn
- Jyutping: Jau4 maa4 dei6 siu2 leon4
- Website: www.hkf.com/en/ferry.html

The Hongkong and Yaumati Ferry Company Limited (HYF) is a ferry company founded in 1897 in Hong Kong. It is commonly known as Yaumati Ferry. After restructuring the company in 1989, it became a subsidiary of Hong Kong Ferry (Holdings) Company Limited (香港小輪(集團)有限公司).

Its head office is in the northern Tsing Yi.

== History ==
The original company was founded by a Chinese businessman named Lau Tak Po in 1897 during the colonial Hong Kong era. At the time he purchased five wooden boats and provided services exclusively to Kowloon under the company name "Yaumati Ferry". Yaumati is the alternative transliteration of Yau Ma Tei.

Until the Ferries Ordinance of 1917, there was no regulation set by the government as to who could run a ferry service. After the ordinance was enacted, no one could operate a ferry service without securing a licence from the government through public tender. (Note: Except for Star Ferry, which obtained a different licence under a ordinance passed in 1902.) The first companies who obtained the licence during 1919-1921 operated poorly; hence, in April 1923, the government issued a call in the Gazette for a tender to operate the Yaumati ferry service. Lau Tak Po then started to recruit other Chinese merchants to compete for the ferry licence. Eventually, Lau Tak Po, together with 13 other merchants, secured the licence in July 1923, and established "the Hong Kong and Yaumati Ferry Company Limited" with Lau Tak Po and Lau King Cho as the managing directors on 5 November 1923.

Hong Kong and Yaumati Ferry obtained the franchise licence for the rights to the transportation route, blocking off competition from Star Ferry company. As a result, the Yaumati Ferry company became the largest Chinese-owned company in the world at that point in time, profiting from the transportation demand of Kowloon expansion.

On 1 January 1924, Hong Kong and Yaumati Ferry commenced its ferry service. The routes included were: Victoria City/Yaumati; Victoria City/Mong Kok Tsui; Victoria City/Sham Shui Po. A fleet of 12 small Wooden hulled vessels were used. Due to warnings from the government as to the low quality of the vessels, the old fleet was eventually replaced by newly built wooden and steel ferries during the 1920s.

Subsequently, the Hong Kong and Yaumati Ferry expanded its services to include the vehicular ferry service in 1933. The service transported motor vehicles across Victoria Harbour for many years (from 1933 to 1998) prior to the opening of the Cross-Harbour Tunnel, Eastern Harbour Tunnel and Western Harbour Tunnel in 1972, 1989 and 1997. The company decided to give up the ferry licences in 1999, and these licences were transferred to the New World First Ferry on 15 January 2000.

== Ownership and control ==
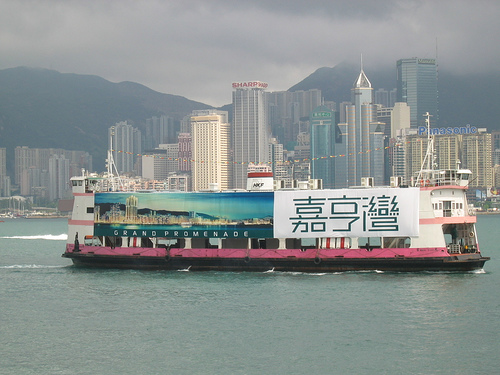

According to official documents, Henderson Investment Ltd. is the largest shareholder of Hongkong and Yaumati Ferry's parent company Hong Kong Ferry. Henderson beneficially owning 31.33% of the share capital of the company as at 31 December 2005. Henderson chairman Dr. Lee Shau Kee and Vice Chairman Colin Lam are also directors of the company.

=== End of ferry service ===
Although it gave up its franchised ferry licences in 2000, the company retained the Dangerous Goods Vehicular Ferry Service routes between North Point, Kwun Tong, and Mui Wo, as these vehicles are not allowed to go through any one of the three cross harbour tunnels, while Mui Wo is situated on Lantau Island.

== Fleet ==
HY Ferry Fleet
Name	Type	Seats	Builder	Year built	Notes
Man Ying (1st Gen.)	Wooden single ended passenger ferry	434	Kwong Tak Cheong Shipyard	1924	Changed to diesel engine in 1947, retired 1957.
Man Lai (1st Gen.)	Double ended passenger ferry	412	Hong Kong and Whampoa Dock Co., Ltd.	1925	Changed to diesel engine in 1949, retired in 1966.
Man Yee (1st Gen.)	Double ended passenger ferry	412	Hong Kong and Whampoa Dock Co., Ltd.	1925	Changed to diesel engine in 1949, retired in 1969.
Man Chung (1st Gen.)	Double ended passenger ferry	412	Hong Kong and Whampoa Dock Co., Ltd.	1925	Changed to diesel engine in 1948, retired in 1969.
Man Shun (1st Gen.)	Double ended passenger ferry	412	Hong Kong and Whampoa Dock Co., Ltd.	1925	Changed to diesel engine in 1949, retired in 1963.
Man Kung (1st Gen.)	Double deck car ferry	800 people, 22 cars	Hong Kong and Whampoa Dock Co., Ltd.	commissioned 1928, finished 1933	Rebuilt in 1948, retired in 1973.
Man Kim (1st Gen.)	Double deck car ferry	368 people, 48 cars	Hong Kong and Whampoa Dock Co., Ltd.	commissioned 1928, finished 1933	Rebuilt in 1947, and 1971, retired in 1974.
Man Yeung (1st Gen.)	Double deck car ferry	800 people, 22 cars	Hong Kong and Whampoa Dock Co., Ltd.	commissioned 1928, finished 1933	Retired in 1973.
Man Gock (1st Gen.)	Double deck car Ferry		Hong Kong and Whampoa Dock Co., Ltd.	commissioned 1928, finished 1933	Sunk at West River (西江) during WWII
Man On	Double deck car ferry		Hong Kong Shipyard	1981
Man Lok	Double deck car ferry		Hong Kong Shipyard	1982	Converted to nightclub on upper deck
Man Foo	Double deck car ferry		Hong Kong Shipyard	1982	Converted to nightclub on upper deck
Man Kim	Double deck car ferry			1982	Converted to nightclub on upper deck
Man Kai	Double deck car ferry		Hong Kong Shipyard	1986
Man Keung	Tugboat
Man Lai	Double deck ferry	364	Hong Kong Shipyard	1970	retired
Man Wo	Double deck ferry	532	Hong Kong Shipyard	1980	retired
Man Hei	Double deck ferry	436	Choey Lee Shipyard	1981	retired
Xin Fa	Triple deck ferry	1298	Hong Kong Shipyard	1981	ex-Man Fat; sold to NWFF
Xin Ying	Double deck ferry	673 - now 604	Hong Kong Shipyard	1982	ex-Man Ying; sold to NWFF
Xin Zhong	Double deck ferry	676	Hong Kong Shipyard	1982	ex-Man Chung; sold to NWFF
Xin Xing	Triple deck ferry	1298	Hong Kong Shipyard	1981	ex-Man Hing; sold to NWFF
Man Heen	Double deck ferry	671 - now 650	Hong Kong Shipyard	1982
Xin Jie	Double deck ferry	671 - now 666	Hong Kong Shipyard	1983	ex-Man Kit; sold to NWFF
Xin Chao	Triple deck ferry	1728	Hong Kong Shipyard	1983	ex-Man Chiu; sold to NWFF
Xin Guang	Triple deck ferry	1505	Hong Kong Shipyard	1985	ex-Man Kwong; sold to NWFF
Xin Fei	Triple deck ferry	1582	Hong Kong Shipyard	1986	ex-Man Fee; sold to NWFF
Xin Guo	Triple deck ferry	1582	Hong Kong Shipyard	1988	ex-Man Kwok; sold to NWFF
HKF I	Waterjet Catamaran	433	Kvaerner Fjellstrand Shipyard	1993
HKF III	Type: Waterjet Catamaran	433	Kvaerner Fjellstrand Shipyard	1994
Aquan One	Double hull Catamaran	208	Afai Shipyard	1997
Aquan Two	Double hull Catamaran	230	Afai Shipyard	1999
