= Hong Kong Ferry =

Hong Kong Ferry (Holdings) Company Limited 香港小輪(集團)有限公司
- Company type: Listed company
- Industry: Property development and Ferry service
- Founded: 1989; 37 years ago
- Headquarters: Tsing Yi, Hong Kong, People's Republic of China
- Area served: Hong Kong
- Key people: Chairman: Colin Lam
- Parent: Henderson Land Development
- Subsidiaries: Hongkong and Yaumati Ferry
- Website: Hong Kong Ferry (Holdings) Company Limited

Hong Kong Ferry (Holdings) Company Limited
- Traditional Chinese: 香港小輪(集團)有限公司
- Simplified Chinese: 香港小轮(集团)有限公司
Transcriptions
Standard Mandarin
- Hanyu Pinyin: Xiānggǎng Xiǎo Lún Jítuán Yǒuxiàngōngsī
Yue: Cantonese
- Yale Romanization: hēung góng síu lèuhn jaahp tyùhn yáuh haahn gūng sī
- Jyutping: Hoeng1 gong2 siu2 leon4 zaap6 tyun4 jau5 haan6 gung1 si1

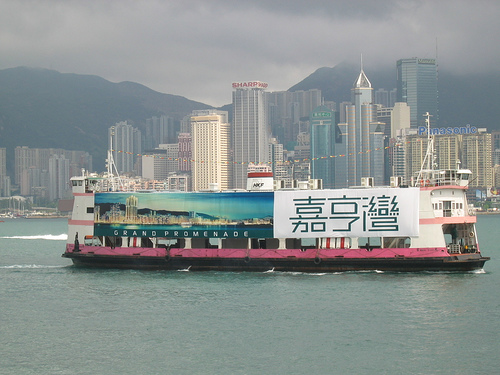
A ferry from Hongkong and Yaumati Ferry Company

Hong Kong Ferry (Holdings) Company Limited (SEHK: 50) is a holding company in Hong Kong involved in property development, ferry, shipyard, travel and hotel operations. It operated franchised ferry services in Hong Kong until 2000, when its ferry licence was transferred to New World First Ferry. Its remaining marine businesses are dangerous goods vehicular ferry service, vessel chartering, floating restaurants and marine diesel oil trading.

The company was formerly the Hongkong and Yaumati Ferry Company which was established in 1923. After it was acquired by Henderson Land Development and a corporate restructuring in 1989, the holding company was renamed Hong Kong Ferry (Holdings) Company Limited and Hongkong and Yaumati Ferry became the subsidiary of Hong Kong Ferry (Holdings).

Its head office is in North Tsing Yi.

== Hong Kong Shipyard ==
The company operates Hong Kong Shipyard, on the north coast of Tsing Yi, through its wholly owned subsidiary, The Hong Kong Shipyard Limited, incorporated in 1948. With a workforce of 140, the shipyard undertakes repair and maintenance of vessels, as well as shipbuilding, and can drydock up to ten vessels simultaneously.

== See also ==
- Star Ferry
