= Cheung Chau Mini Great Wall =

Hiking trail in New Territories, Hong Kong

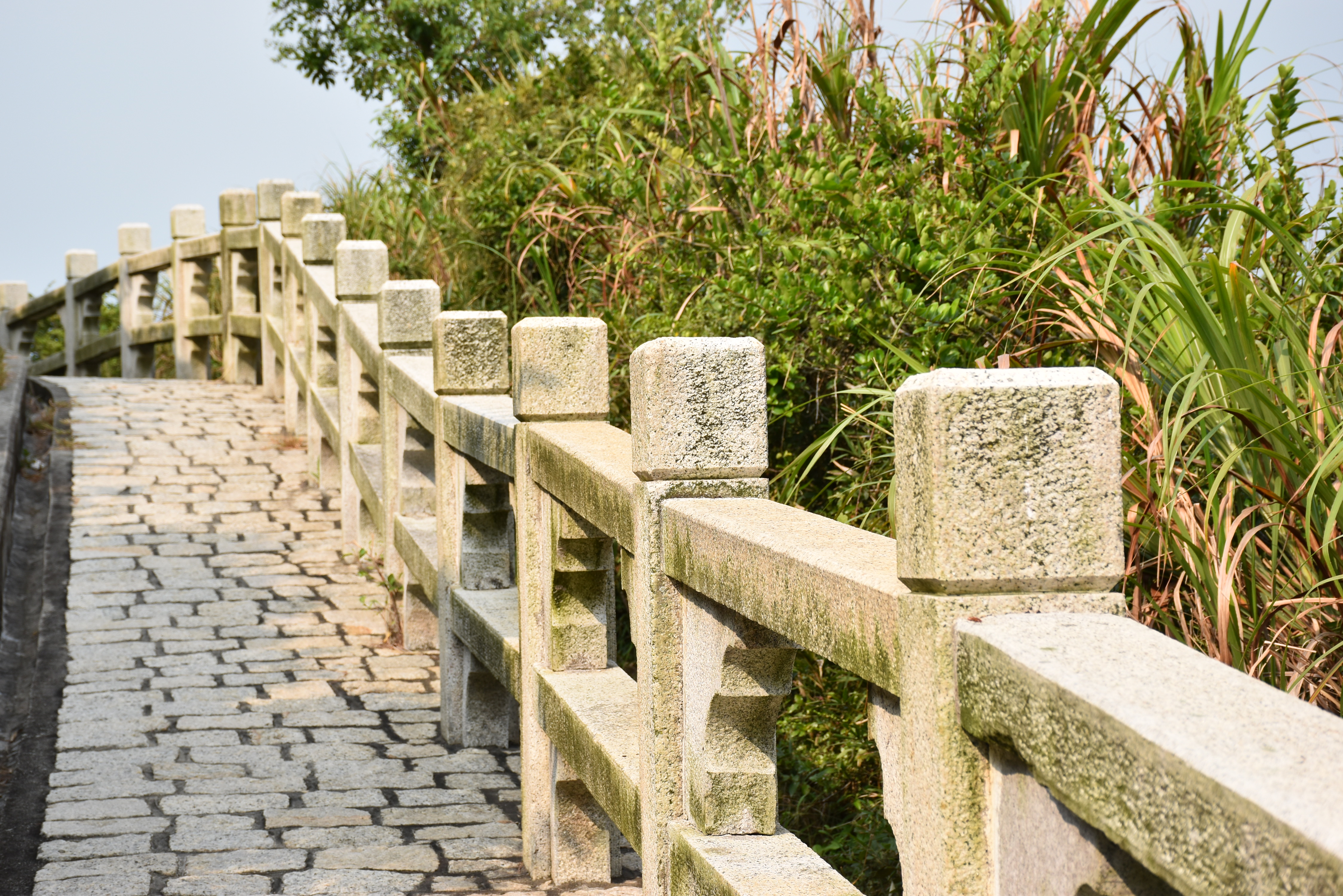
- Cheung Chau Mini Great Wall
- Length: 850m
- Location: Cheung Chau, Hong Kong
- Use: Hiking
- Website: Hong Kong Tourism Board

Cheung Chau Mini Great Wall
- Traditional Chinese: 小長城
Transcriptions
Yue: Cantonese
- Yale Romanization: Síu chèuhng sìhng
- Jyutping: Siu^{2} coeng^{4} sing^{4}

The Mini Great Wall or Little Great Wall is a hiking trail on Cheung Chau, an island of Hong Kong.

Constructed in 1997 by the Home Affairs Department, it is a part of the Cheung Chau Family Trail. The whole trail is about 850 metres long, located at the back of Kwun Yam Beach and on the headland of Chi Ma Hang, southeast of Cheung Chau. The name “Mini Great Wall” is given from the line of granite railings which looks similar to the Great Wall of China. The trail passes by a variety of specially-shaped rocks including the Loaf Rock, the Rock of the Ringing Bell, the Eagle Rock, Fa Peng Rock, Rock of the Serpent, Goat Rock, Human Head Rock, Rock of the Sleeping Crane, Rock of the Skull, Elephant Rock, Rodent Rock, Rock of the Sleeping Cat, Yuk Saai Shek, Camel Rock, Zombie Rock, and Tortoise Rock.

== Trail ==
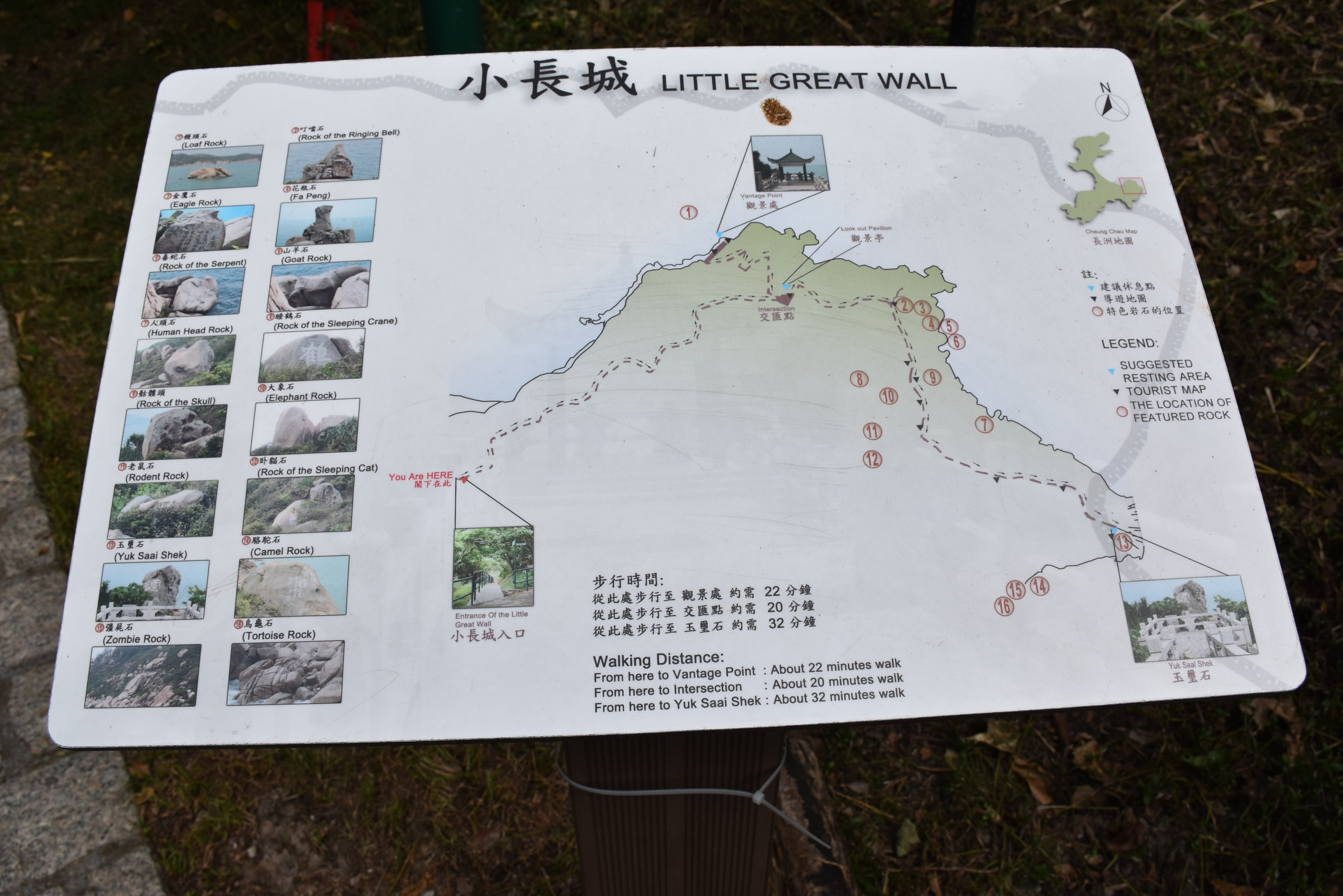
Map of the Mini Great Wall

The route provides some observation points for people to overlook the South China Sea as well as up close and personal views of strangely shaped rocks peppering the trail. The locals have given some of the rock formations descriptive names.

== Rocks ==
There are 16 famous special-shaped rocks along the path. All of these rocks are granite and are weathered into different shapes. The rocks got their names with regard to their appearances. Most of the rocks went through honeycomb weathering, block disintegration and granular disintegration.

=== Loaf Rock ===
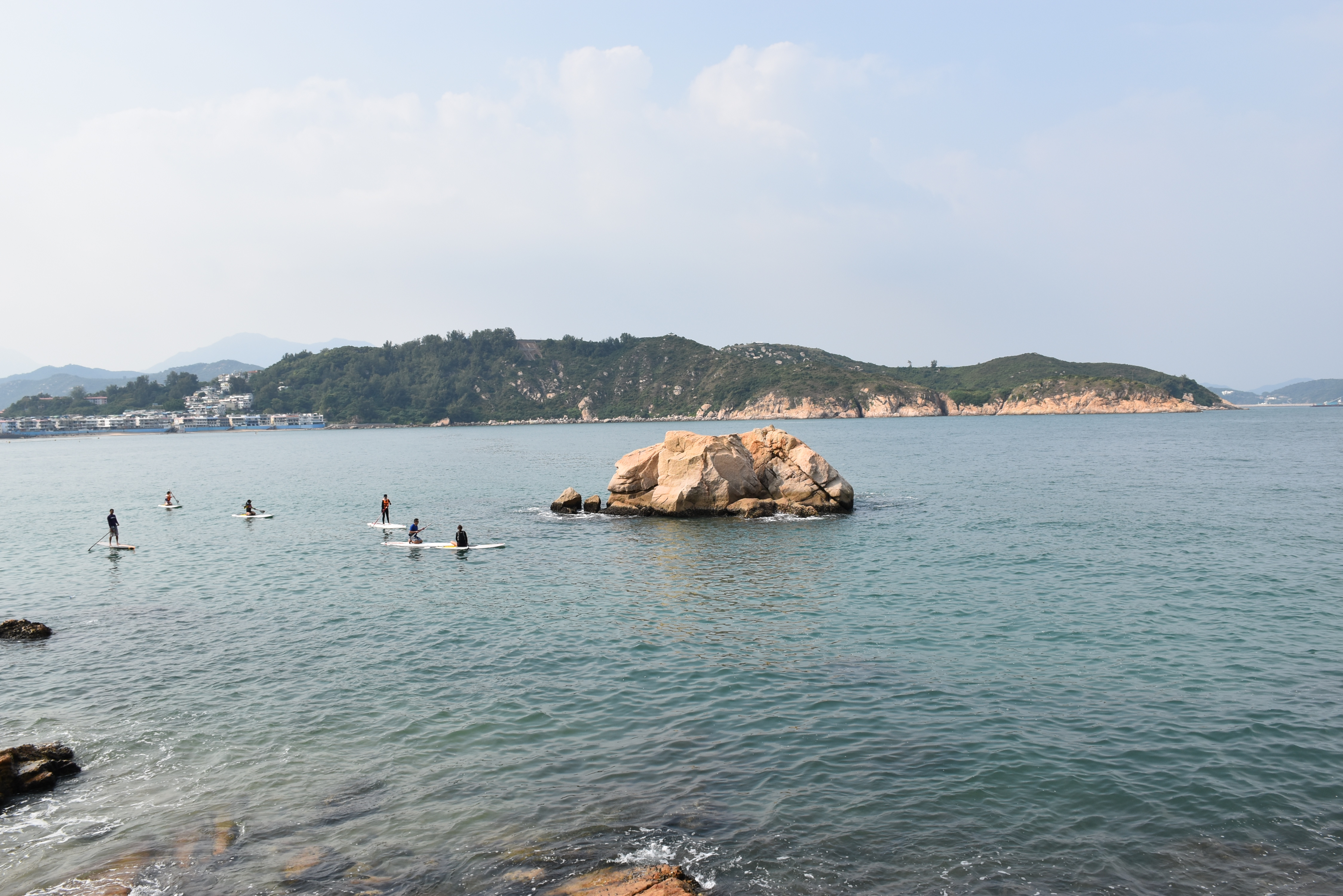
Loaf Rock in Cheung Chau

The Loaf Rock is a stack, which is a coastal erosional landform. It was originally the headland of Chi Ma Hang, where cracks formed after rapid hydraulic erosion. The cracks enlarged and formed a cave. When it was further eroded, an arch was formed. Once the overhanging part of the sea arch collapsed, a free-standing stack was left over, which was the loaf-like Loaf Rock.

=== Rock of the Ringing Bell ===
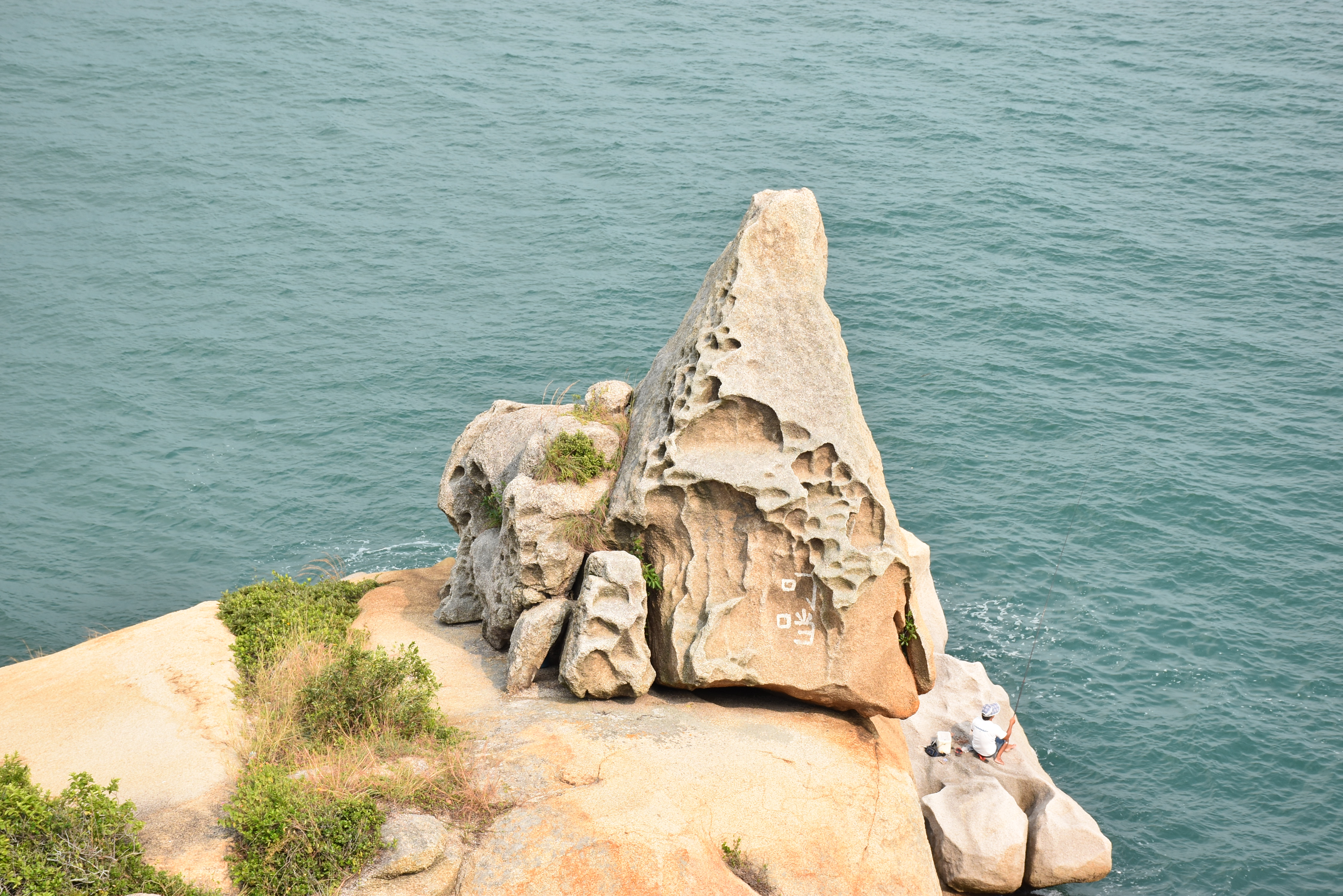
Rock of the Ringing Bell in Cheung Chau

The Rock of the Ringing Bell (叮噹石) is a tor which looks like a ringing bell. It is located near the Fa Peng Rock.

Honeycomb weathering takes place on Rock of the Ringing Bell. Salt sprays from seawater dissolved chemical materials in the rock and so produced a honeycomb look.

=== Eagle Rock ===
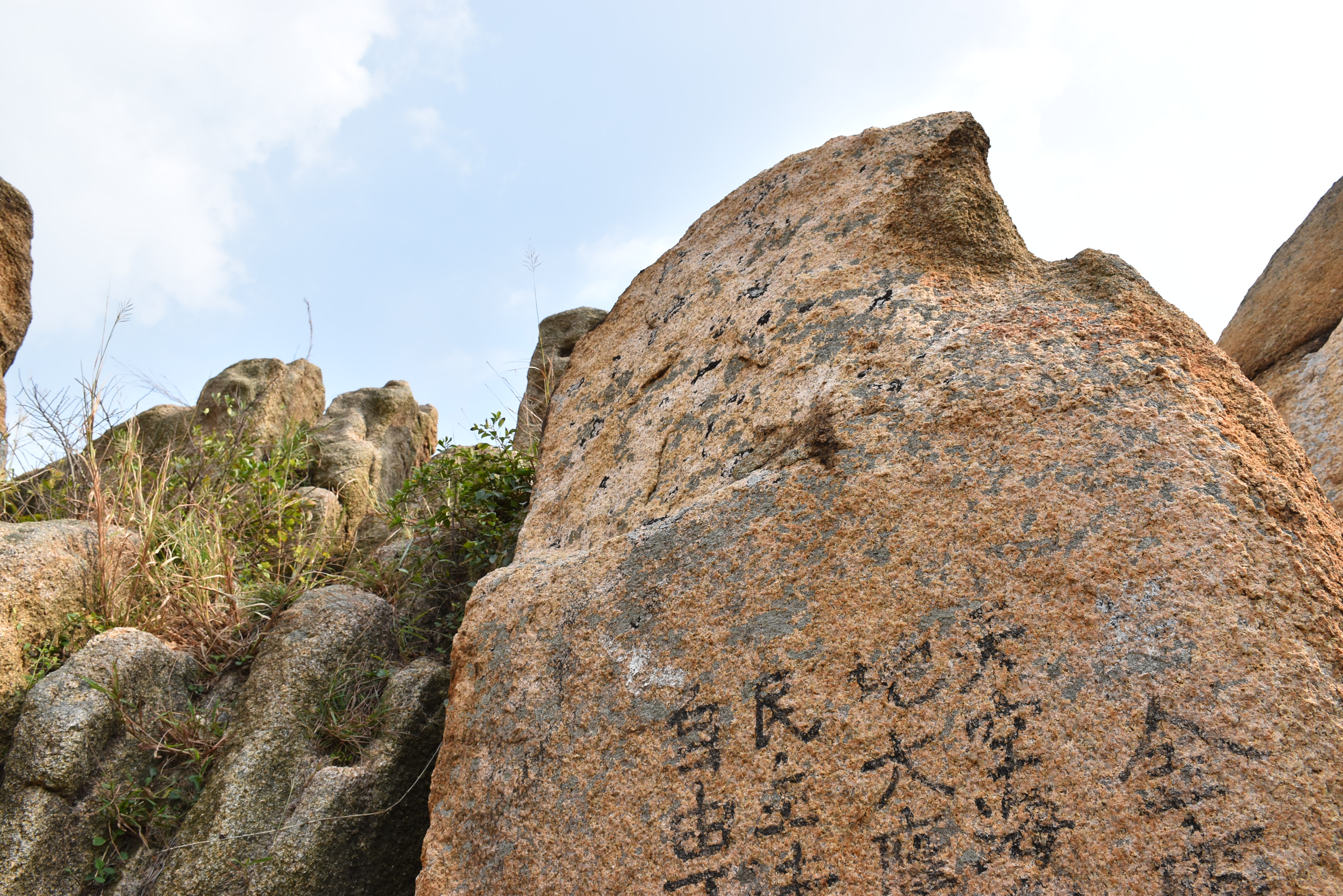
Eagle rock

The Eagle Rock is located near Fa Peng Rock. It looks like an eagle standing on the coast facing the South China Sea.

=== Fa Peng Rock ===
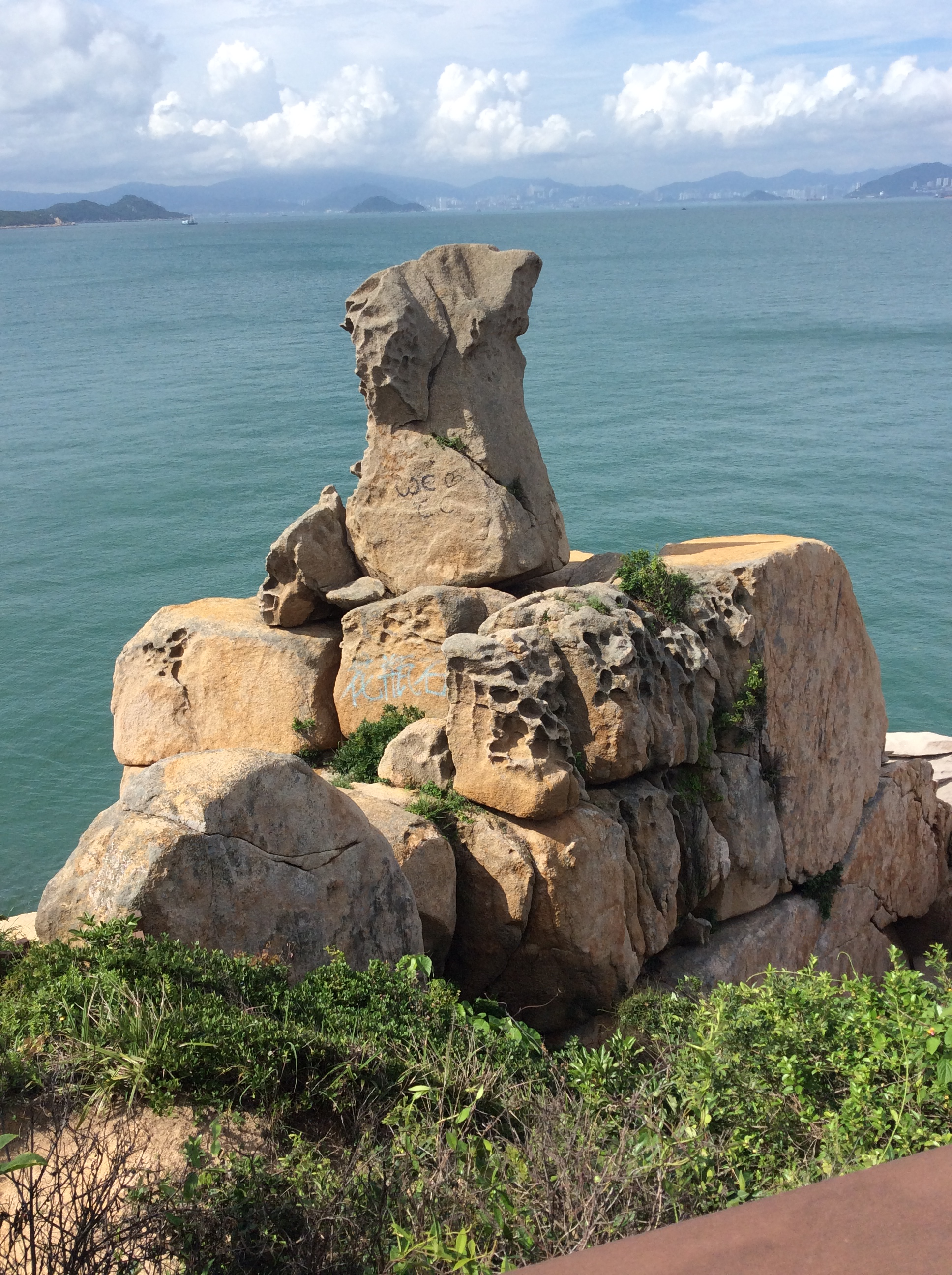
Fa Peng Rock in Cheung Chau

Fa Peng (花瓶, literally "Vase") Rock is one of the most famous tors in Hong Kong. The rocks were originally below the ground surface. As the main rock type in Cheung Chau is granite, chemical weathering can easily take place. Due to the presence of deep weathering profiles, granite layer on the top turned into fine-sized soil by spheroidal weathering, and granite on the bottom turned into big, rounded corestones. When the overlying soil was removed by external medium such as wind and rain, the corestone piled up and formed this vase-looking tor. Honeycomb weathering has also been taking place on Fa Peng Rock ongoingly.

=== Human Head Rock ===
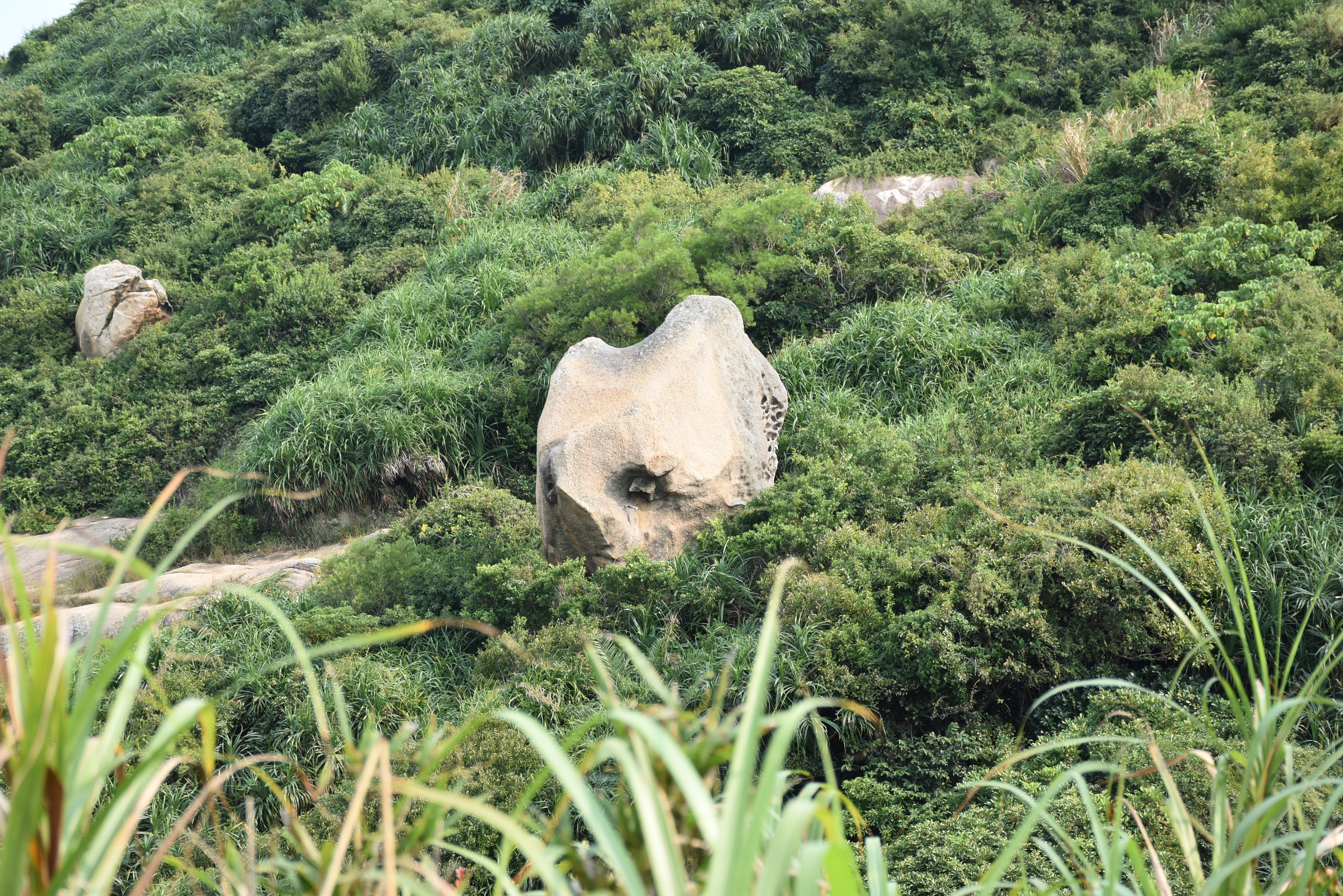
Human head rock

Human Head Rock is the most famous rock along the path. From the side view, the rock bears the outline of a human face. Honeycomb weathering takes place on Human Head Rock. Deep pits like honeycombs are found on the surface of the rock due to solution of chemical materials by water. In addition, granular disintegration takes place. It is a kind of physical weathering. As different minerals expand and contract at variable rates during daytime and nighttime, different minerals may lose grains by repeated expansion and contraction. Grains are then finally scattered at the base of rocks.

=== Rock of the Skull ===
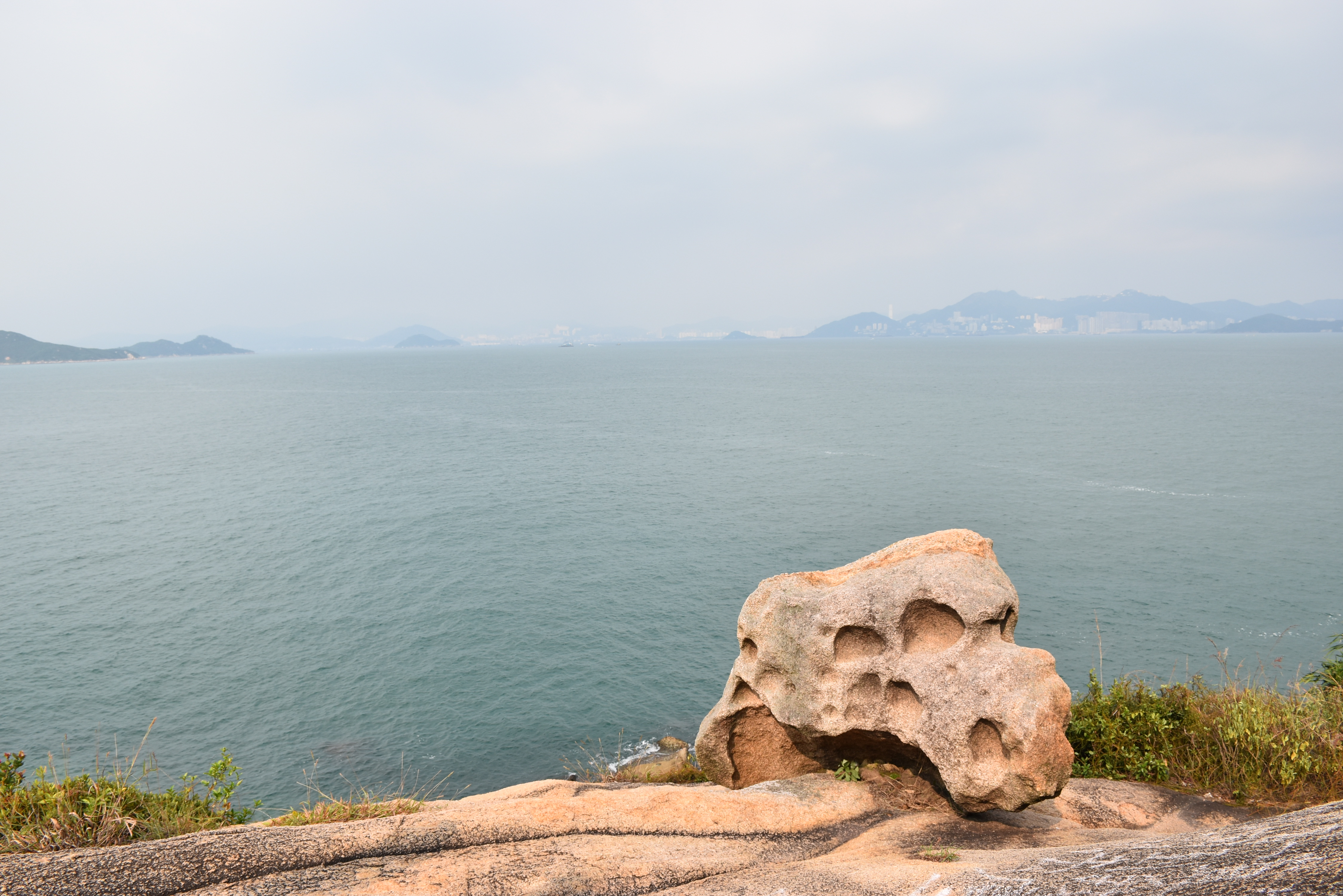
Rock of the skull

Rock of the Skull is located near Human Head Rock. It resembles the skull with hollows at the positions of the eyes formed by honeycomb weathering and granular disintegration.

=== Yuk Saai Shek ===
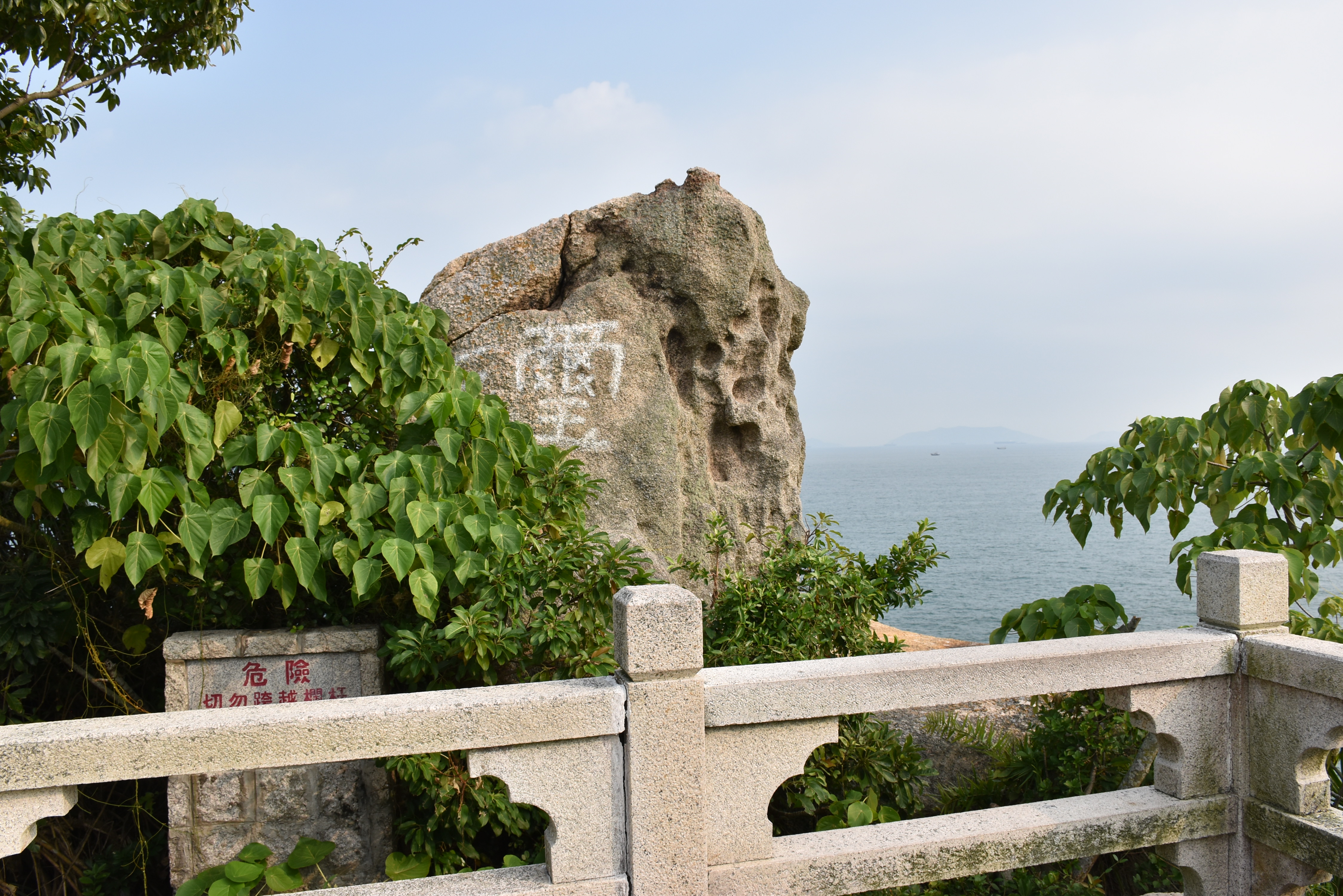
Yuk Saai Shek in Cheung Chau

Yuk Saai Shek (玉璽石, literally "Imperial Jade Seal Rock,") is located at the end of the Mini Great Wall. Honeycomb weathering and granular disintegration took place to shape it.

=== Tortoise Rock ===
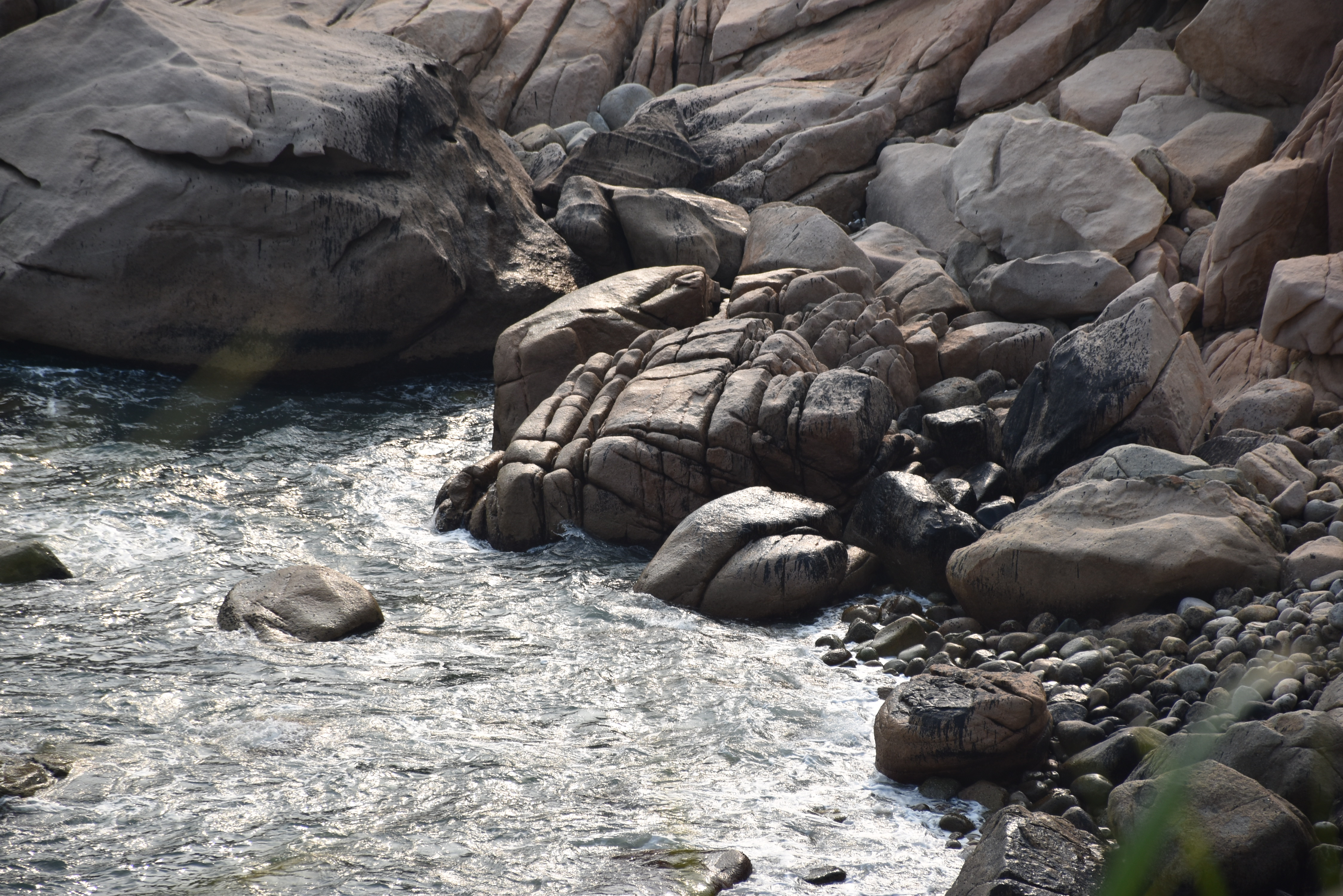
Tortoise Rock in Cheung Chau

Tortoise Rock is located beneath Zombie Rock. Block disintegration took place in which the rock broke apart like slices of bread by physical weathering. It occurred in well-jointed rocks and an environment which large diurnal range of temperature. After repeated expansion and contraction, joints enlarged causing large masses to split away from the main rock.

== Scenery ==
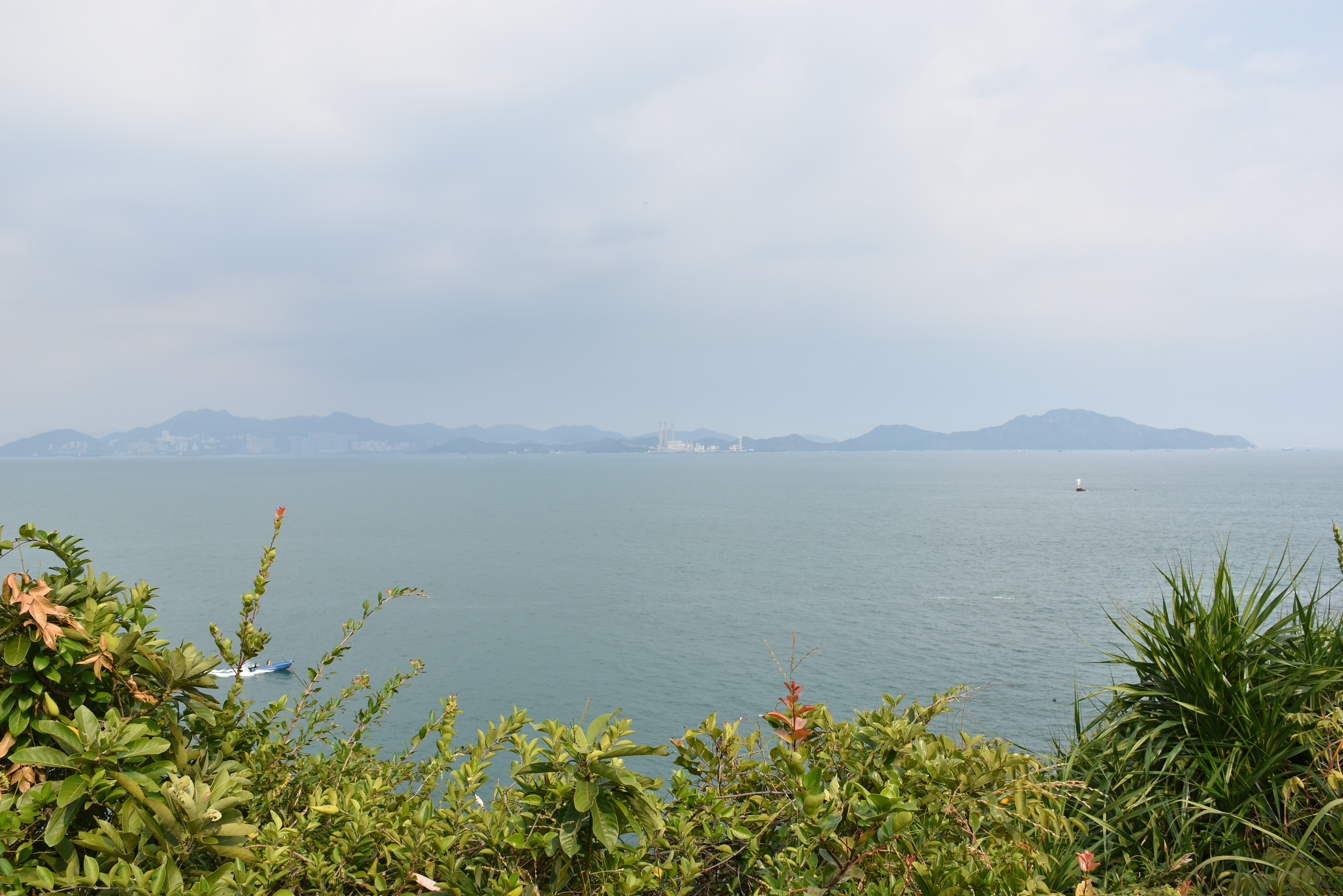
The view of Lamma Island

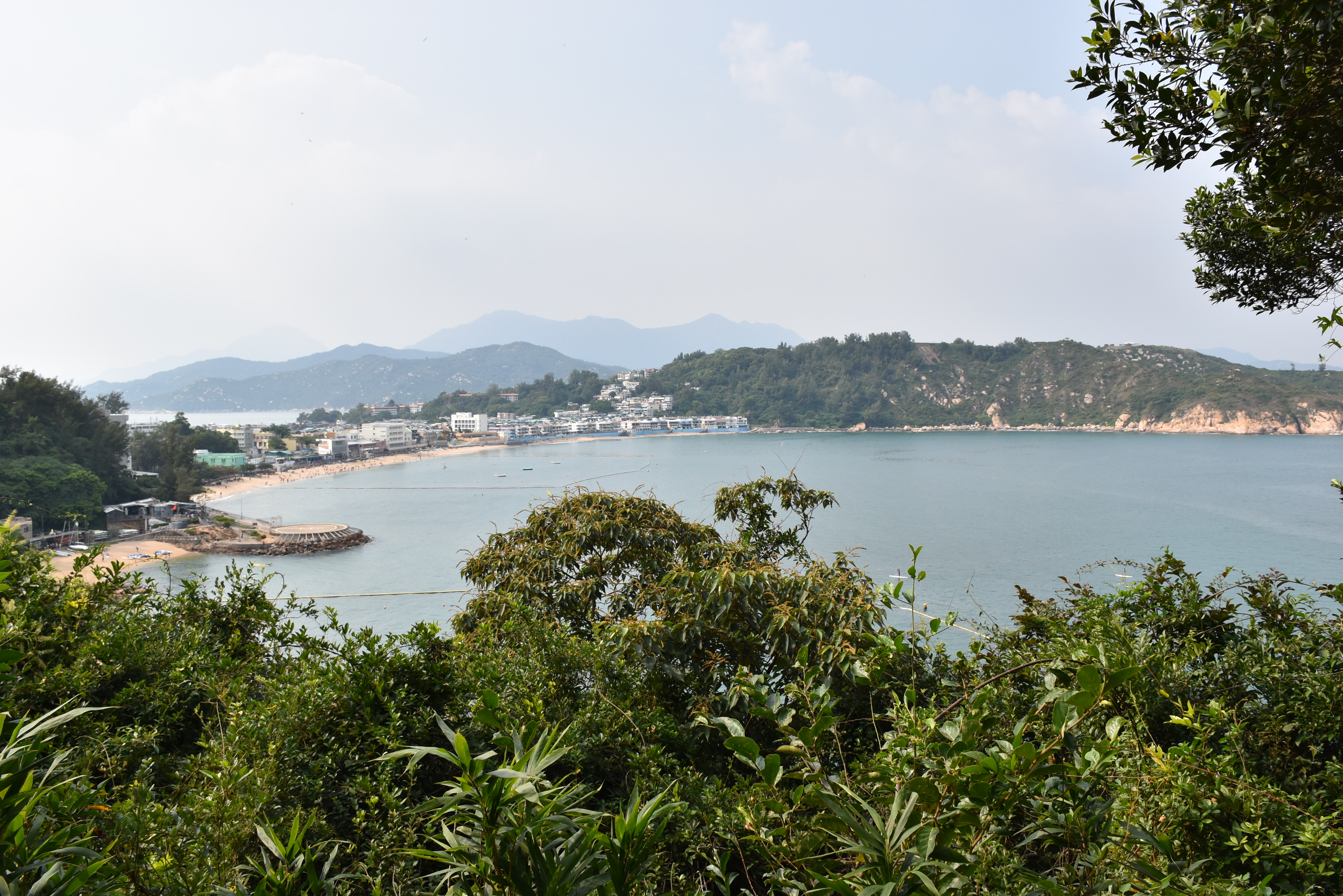
The view of Cheung Chau

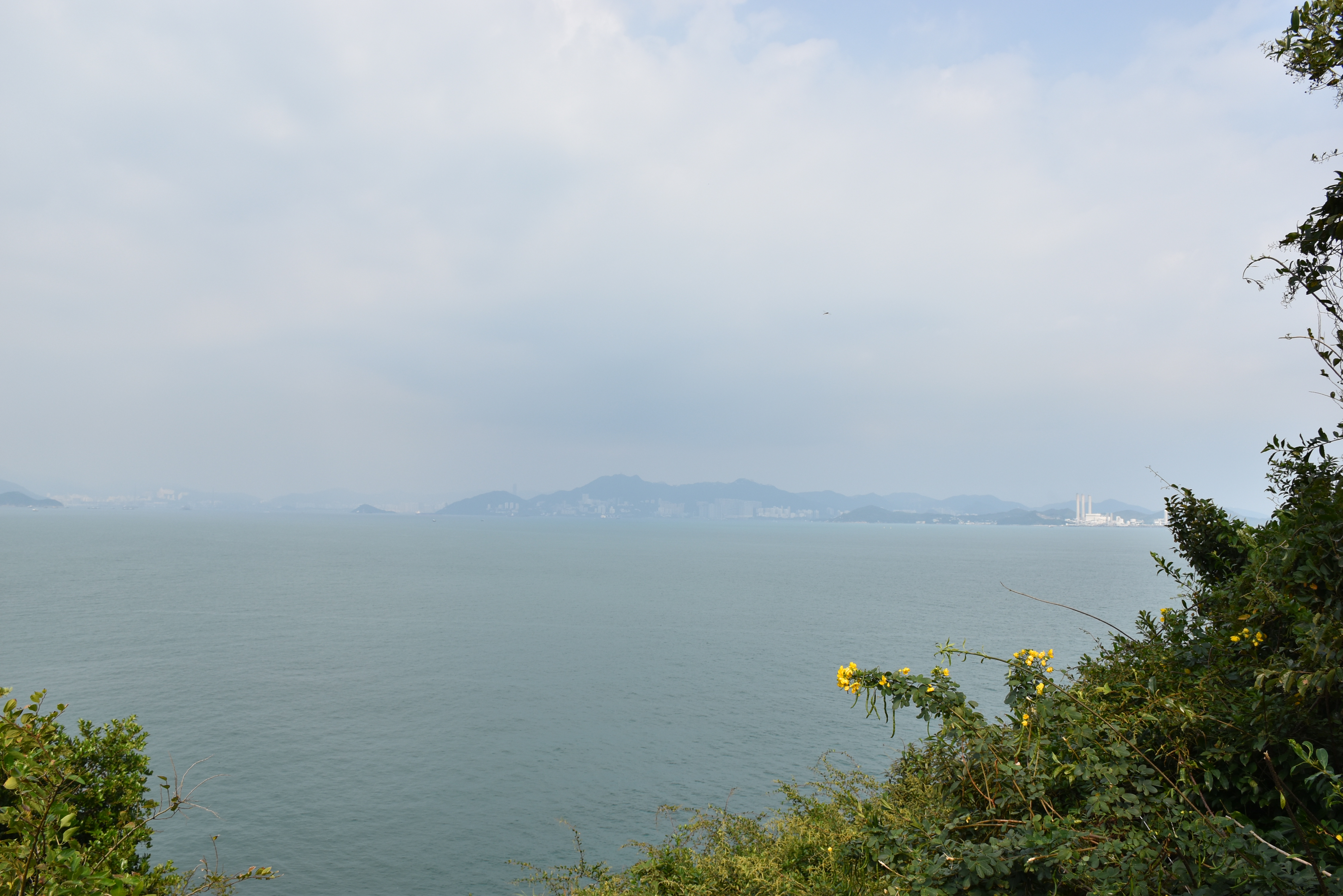
The view of Cyber Port and Pok Fu Lam

== Facilities ==
The whole trail has a line railings of approximately 30 metres long in total, 10-metre-long chain link balusters, 12 tours and 7 direction signages established by the Home Affairs Department in 2011. There are also two lookout pavilions on the trail for travellers to take a rest. Fire beaters are also provided by the H.A.D. for putting out hill fire.

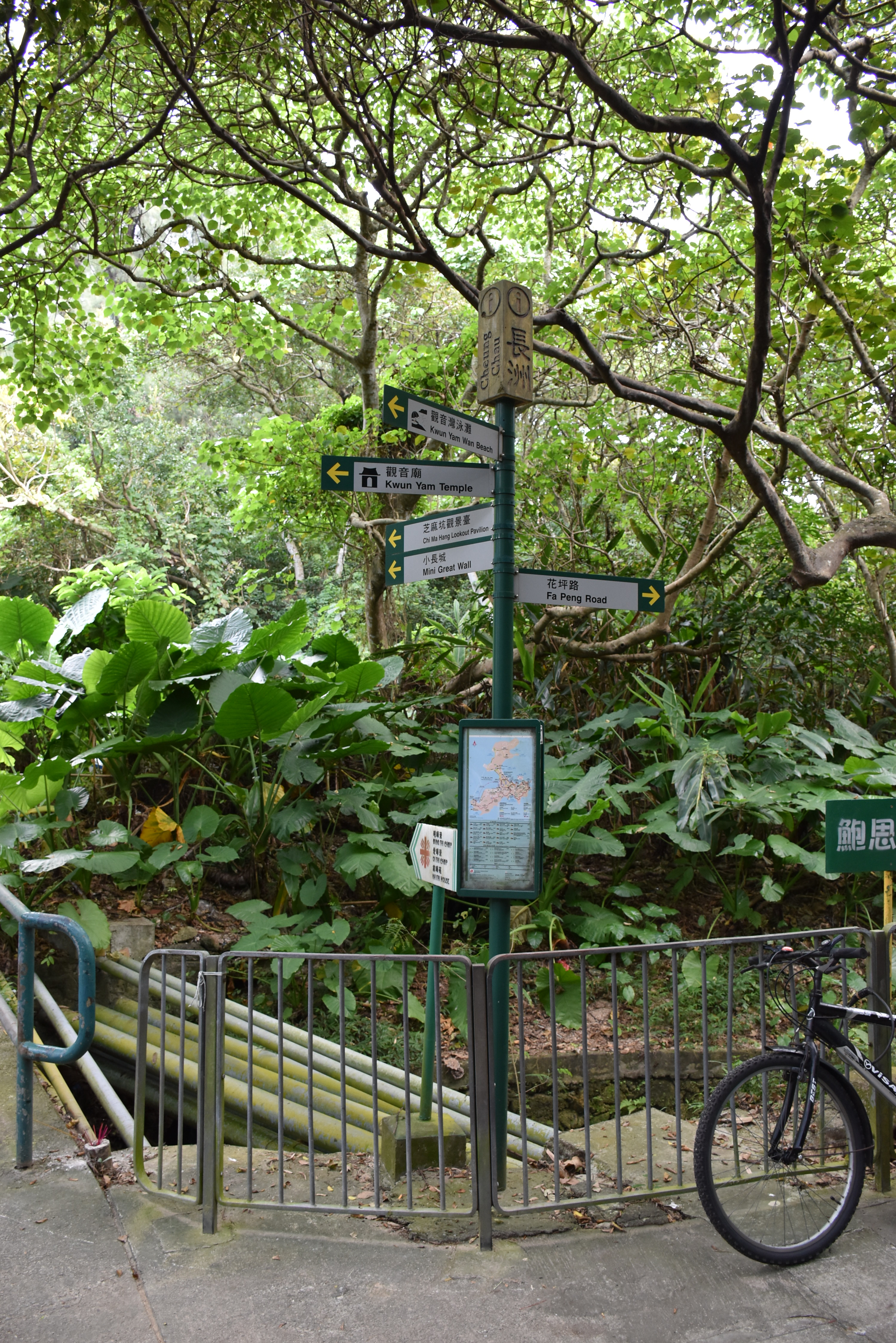
The direction signage

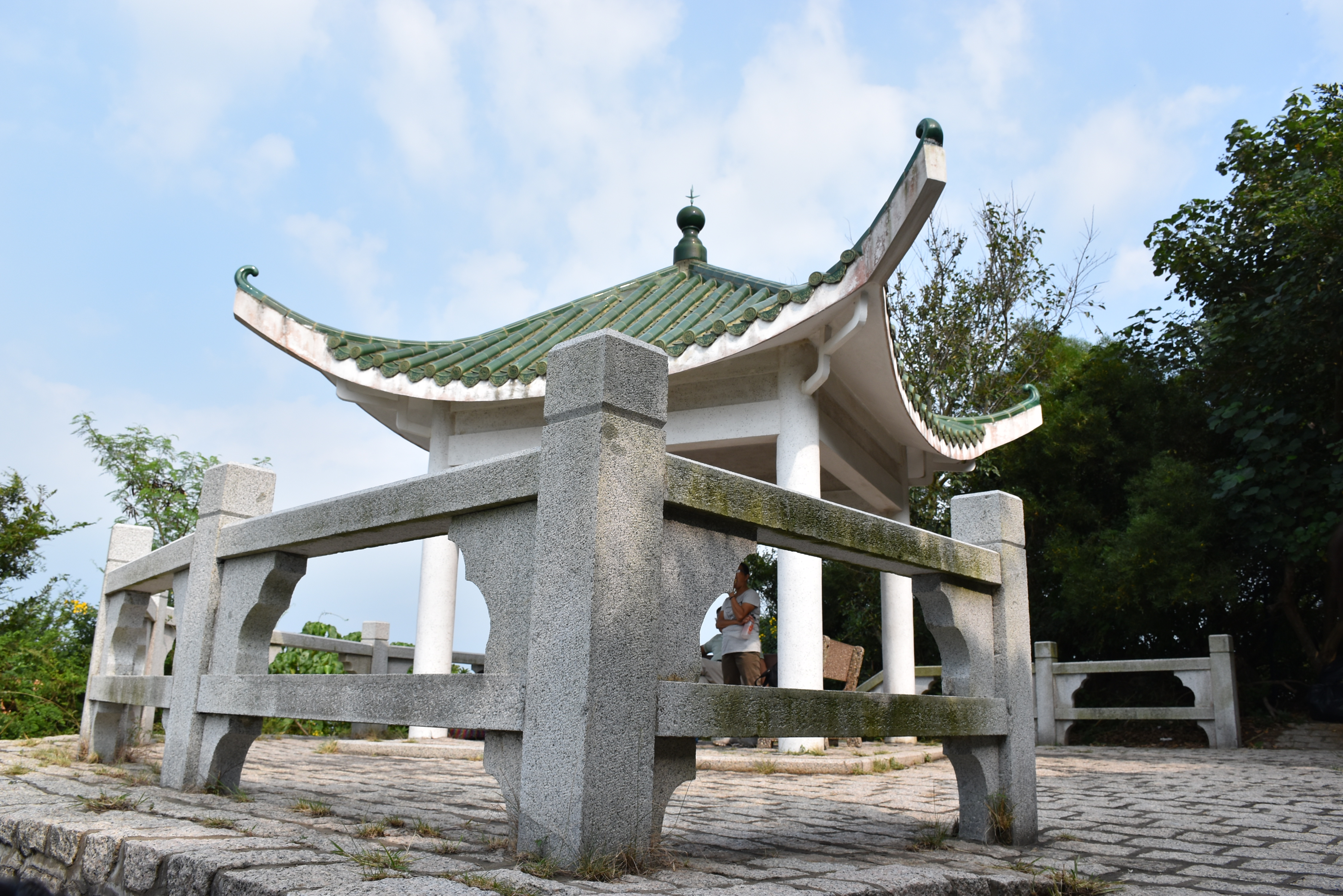
The lookout pavilion

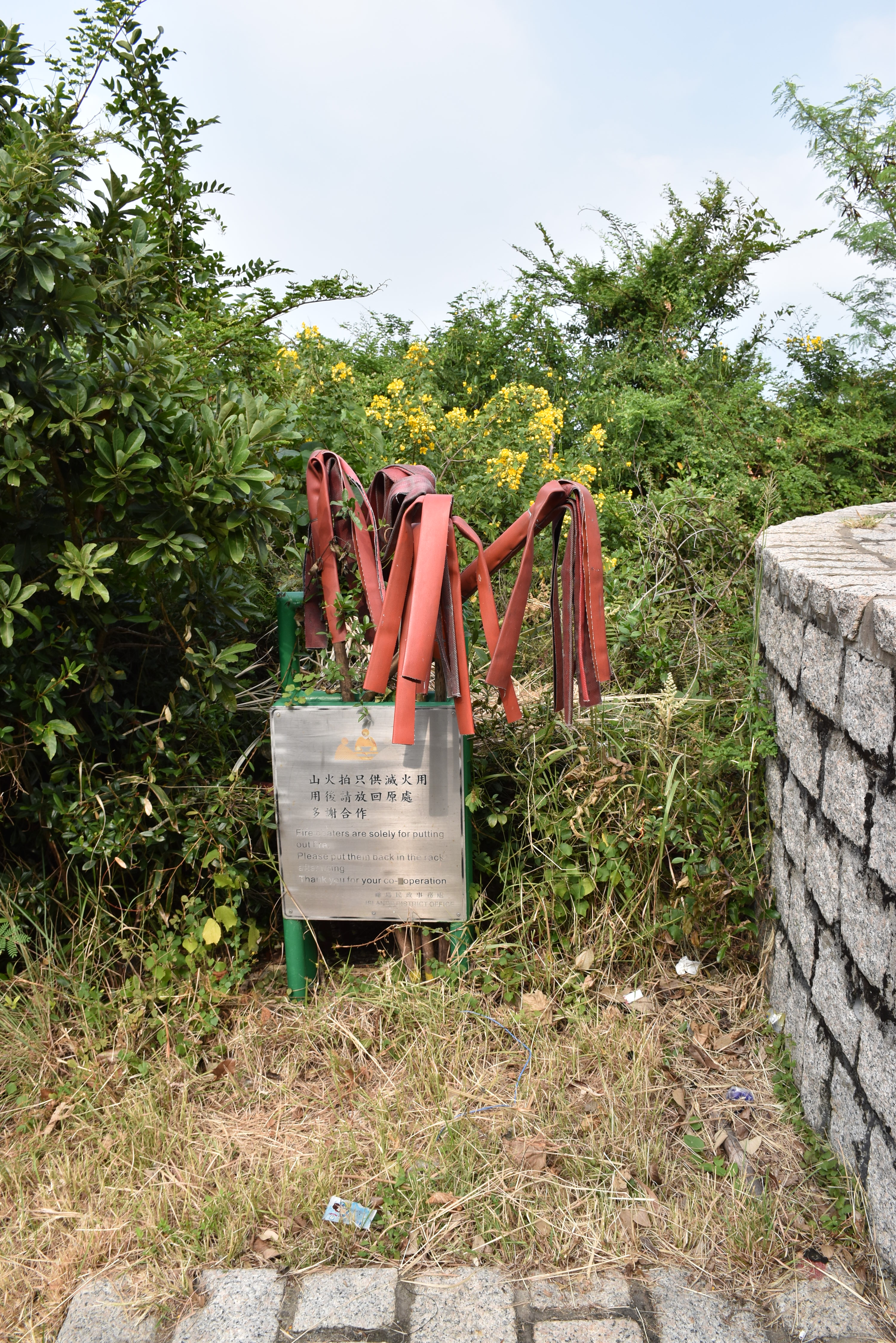
Fire beater

== Access ==
Go to Central Pier 5 and take a ferry to Cheung Chau (for around 55–60 minutes or 35–40 minutes respectively depending on if you are boarding the ordinary ferry or the fast ferry). Reach the Tung Wan Beach by walking along Tung Wan Road for around 10 minutes from the Cheung Chau ferry pier . Then, walk along Cheung Chau Beach Road for approximately 15 minutes and walk towards Kwun Yam Temple until arriving at the entrance of the Mini Great Wall.

== Gallery ==
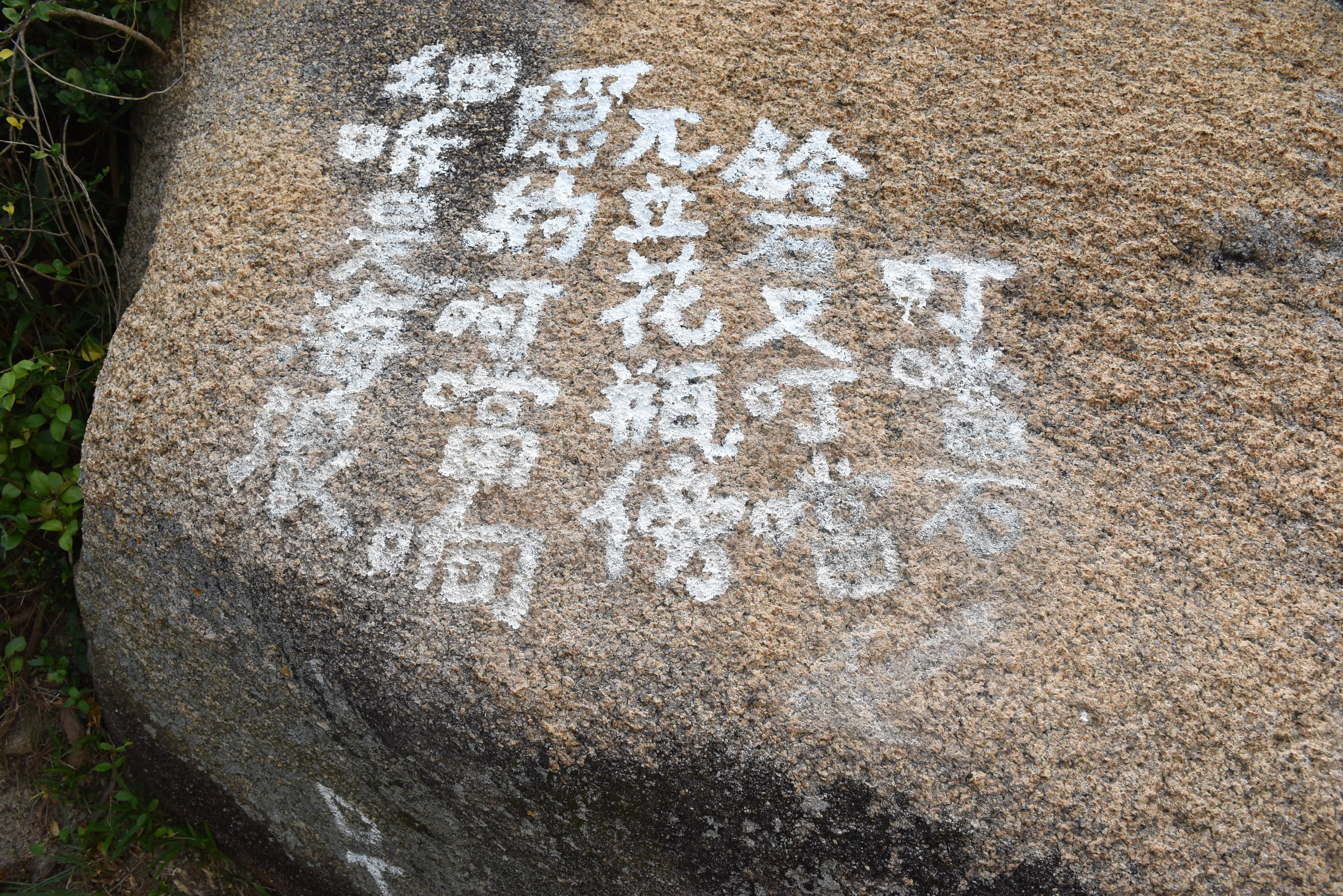
Poem written by travellers

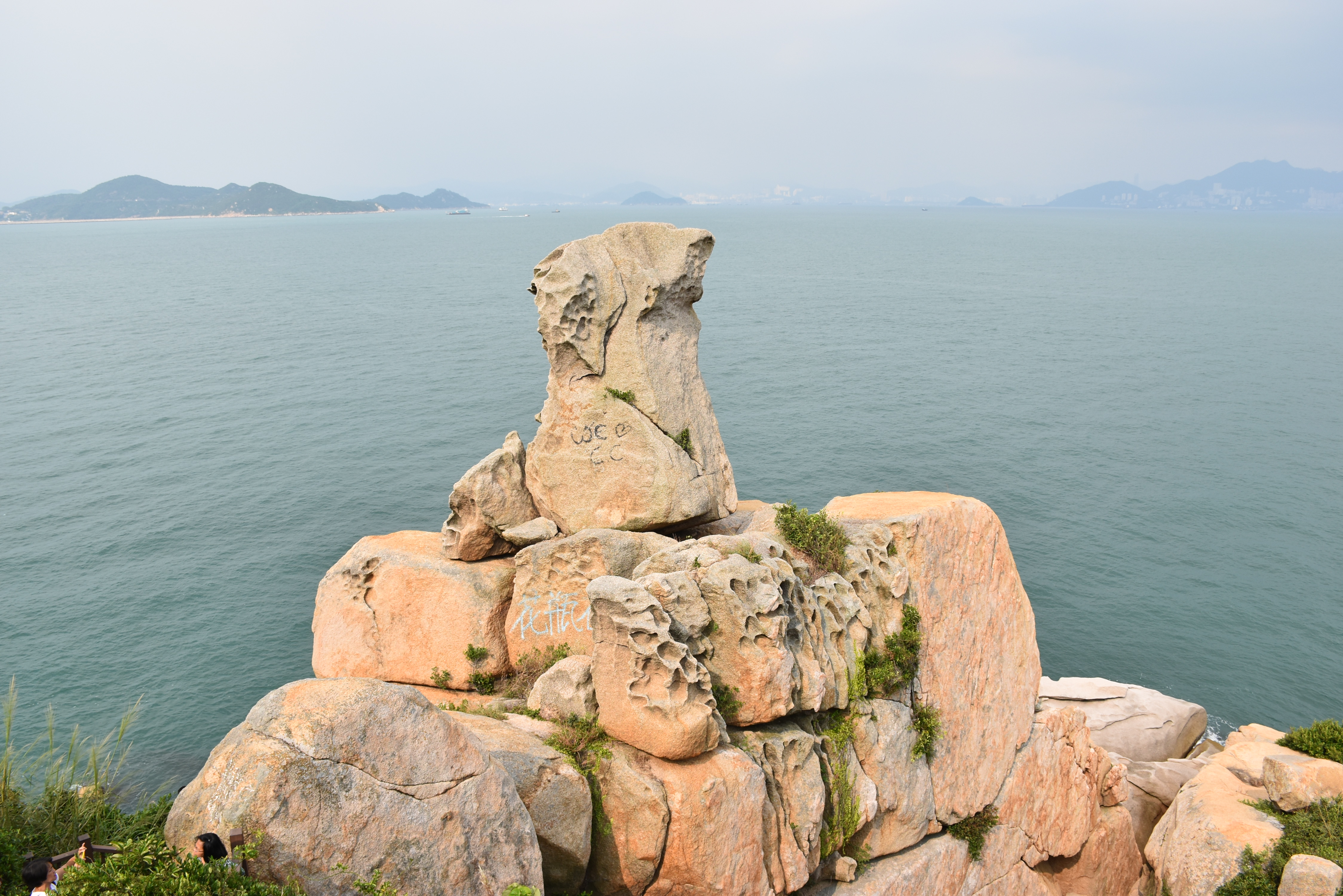
Fa Peng Rock

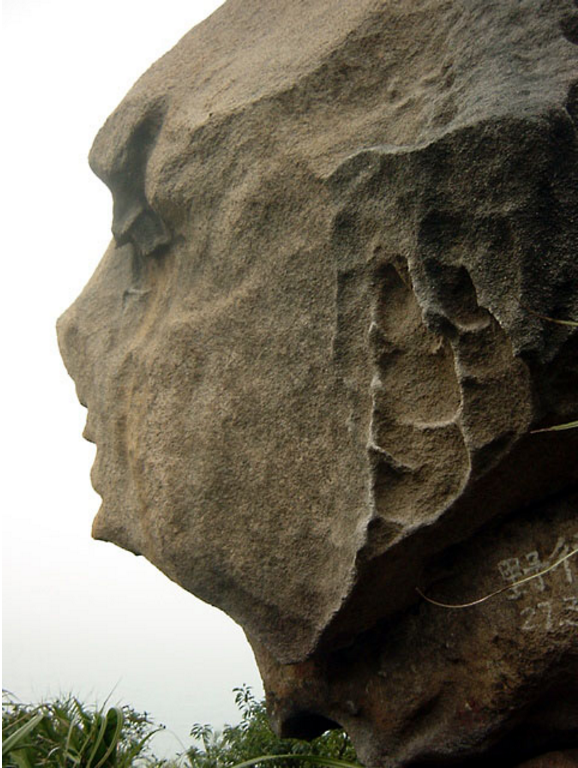
Human head rock

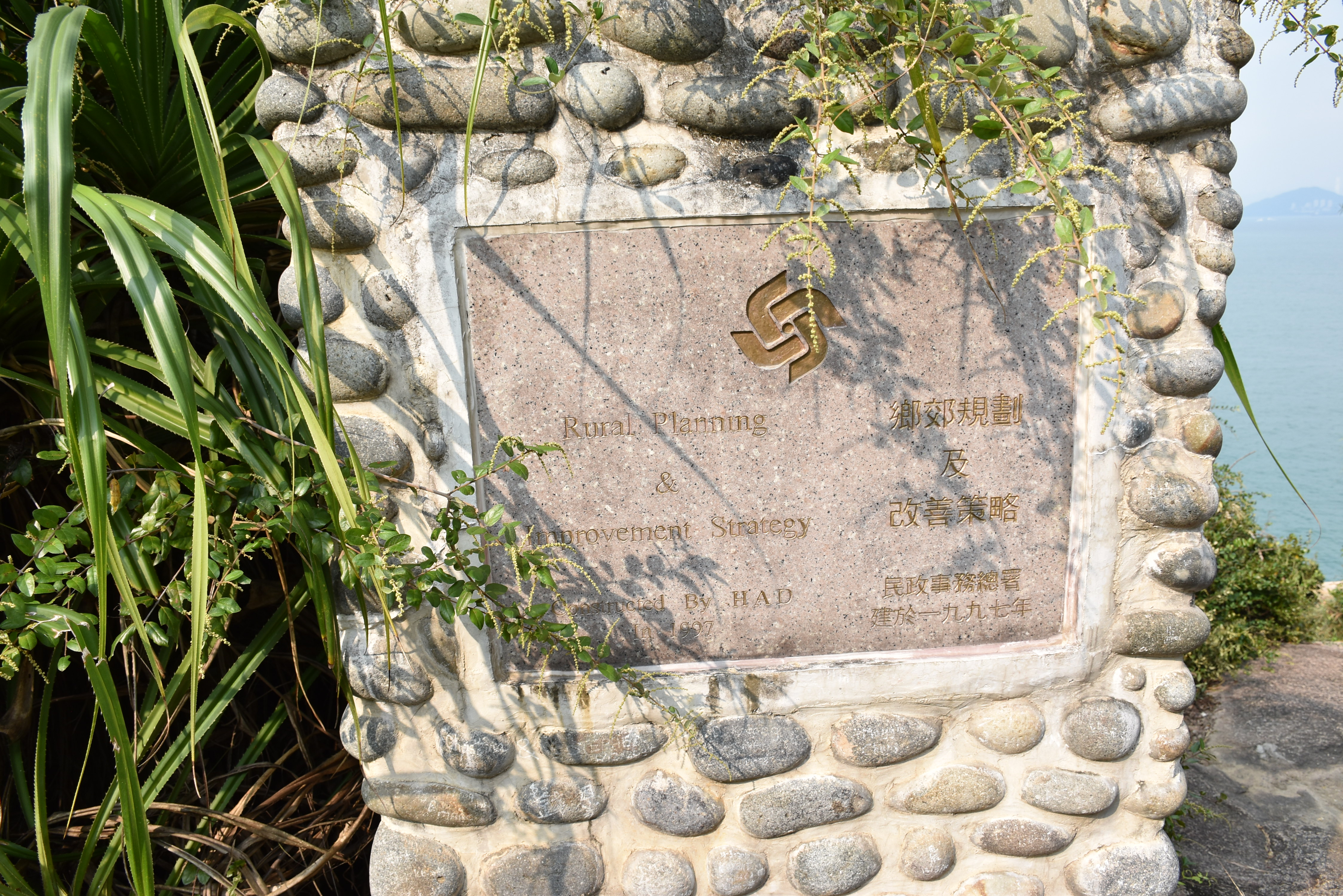
Mini Great Wall was constructed in 1997.
