= Outlying Islands, Hong Kong =

Overview of the Outlying Islands of Hong Kong

- Traditional Chinese: 離島
- Simplified Chinese: 离岛
Transcriptions
Standard Mandarin
- Hanyu Pinyin: Lídǎo
Yue: Cantonese
- Yale Romanization: Lèih dóu
- Jyutping: Lei4 dou2

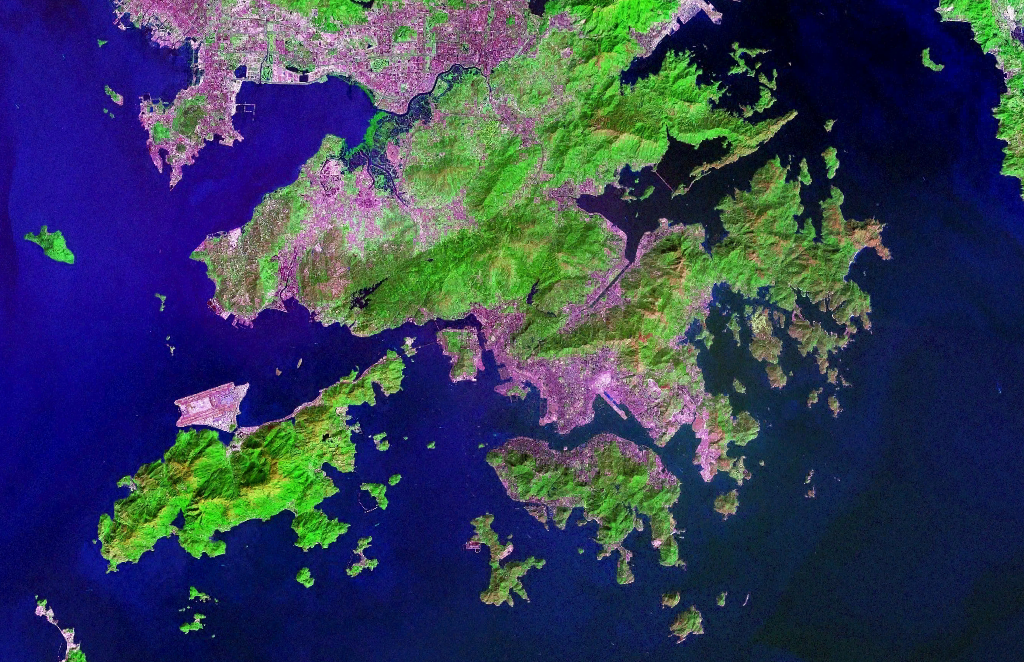
Hong Kong and its islands

The Outlying Islands are all the islands that make up the territory of Hong Kong, with the exception of Hong Kong Island and some smaller islands near its coast. There are 263 islands over 500 m^{2} in Hong Kong, the vast majority of which are located within the New Territories, with significant numbers located in Islands District in the south and southwest, Sai Kung District in the southeast, and Tai Po District and North District in the northeast. The term "outlying" is not strictly defined and in some cases islands very close to Hong Kong Island and mainland China are not included.

Inconvenient transport meant that development came relatively late compared to other parts of Hong Kong, and many islands are still undeveloped. Many of the outlying islands are sparsely populated and remain largely rural, although there are significant traditional villages and towns on the islands of Lantau, Peng Chau, Lamma, and Cheung Chau.

However, urban development has been made. For instance, the island of Tsing Yi became part of Tsuen Wan New Town in the late 1970s, and is now linked to the rest of Hong Kong by several road and rail bridges. In the 1980s, Discovery Bay was privately developed as an upmarket residential area on Lantau, served by a fast ferry service to the central business district. In the 1990s, the development of the new Hong Kong Airport, off the north shore of Lantau, led to the creation of a road and rail link to that island and the development of Tung Chung, previously a small settlement, into a new town adjacent to the airport. As a result of this improved access, further developments on Lantau followed, including a road link to Discovery Bay, and the development of Hong Kong Disneyland Resort.

The more rural islands, and the rural areas of Lantau, are popular recreation spots and weekend getaway destinations for those living in the more densely populated parts of the territory.

== Ferry services ==
Ferry/Kai-to services to the outlying islands run as follows:

- Central to Peng Chau, Cheung Chau, Lamma Island, Mui Wo, Discovery Bay and Park Island (Tsing Yi).
- Sam Ka Tsuen to Tung Lung Island
- Aberdeen to Lamma Island
- Aberdeen and Stanley to Po Toi Island
- Ma Liu Shui to Grass Island
- Tuen Mun to Tung Chung
- Wong Shek pier to Grass Island
- Sha Tau Kok pier to Kat O

== See also ==
- Kai-to
- List of islands and peninsulas of Hong Kong
- New Zealand outlying islands
- United States Minor Outlying Islands
- Village vehicle
