= Village vehicle =

Village vehicles
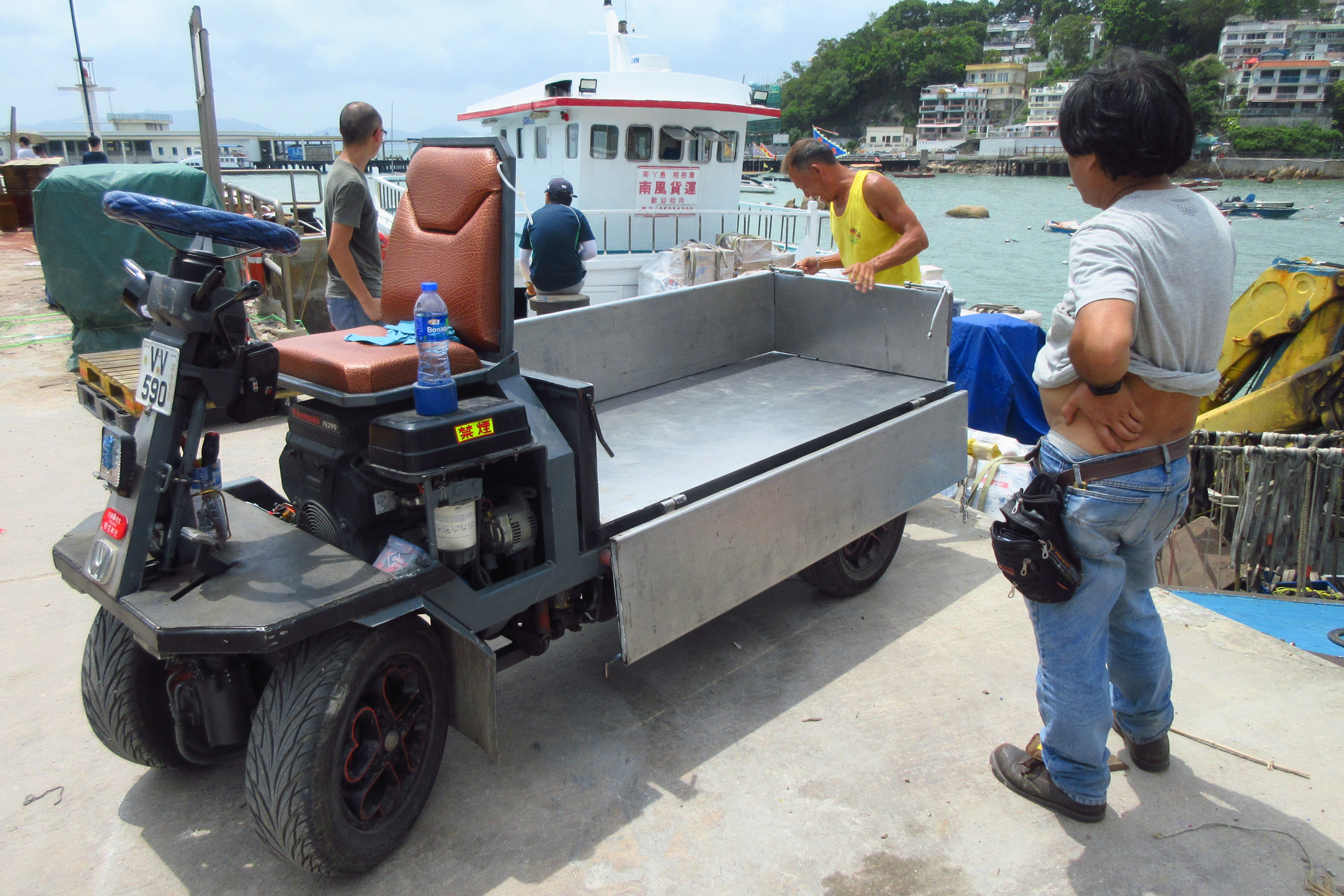
- A village vehicle on Lamma Island

Overview
- Manufacturer: Various

Body and chassis
- Class: Goods vehicle

Dimensions
- Length: <3.2m
- Width: <1.2m

Village vehicle
- Traditional Chinese: 鄉村車輛
Transcriptions
Yue: Cantonese
- Yale Romanization: Hēung chyūn chē leuhng
- Jyutping: Hoeng^{1} cyun^{1} ce^{1} loeng^{6}

Village vehicles are a particular type of very light goods vehicle used on the outlying islands in Hong Kong where there is no road connection. They are often used to transport goods around the islands from the ferry pier where they are deposited. There is no standard layout for village vehicles; they may have wheels or treads, use a steering wheel or a tiller, but the major defining features are their size and use.

Officially, village vehicles are defined by the government of Hong Kong as:

a motor vehicle, controlled either by a driver or a pedestrian, having an overall length not exceeding 3.2 metres and an overall width not exceeding 1.2 metres, constructed or adapted primarily for the carriage of goods on roads in rural areas or areas inaccessible or closed to other motor vehicles

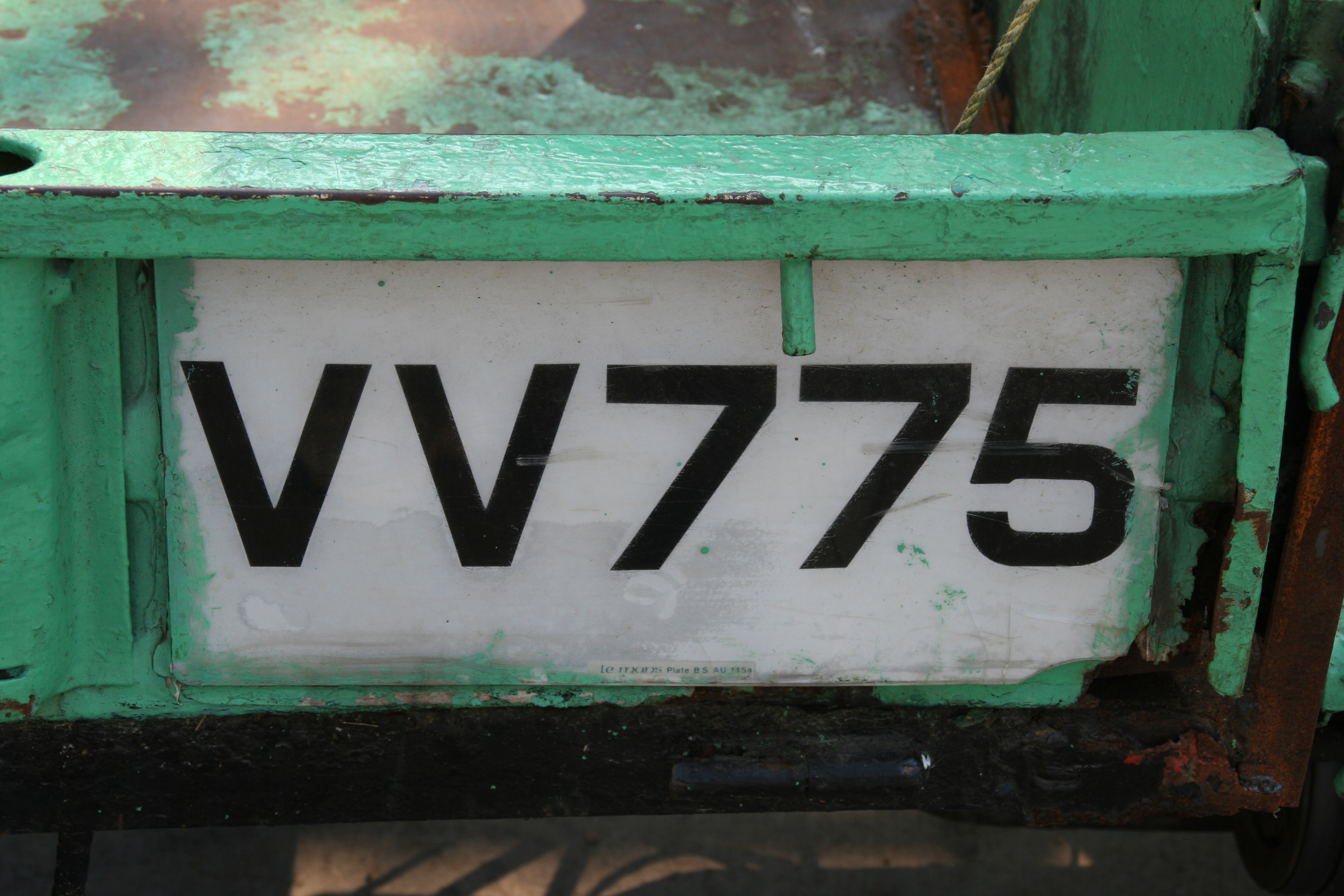
Registration plate of a Vehicle in Cheung Chau, Hong Kong SAR

The legal requirements of permit holders of village vehicles are governed by the Road Traffic (Village Vehicles) Regulations (Cap 374N). All village vehicles in Hong Kong start with the letters "VV" on their registration plates.

One company which manufactures village vehicles is the Kwok Tai Motor & Pump Company Ltd, however many others are of unclear origin.

== Gallery ==
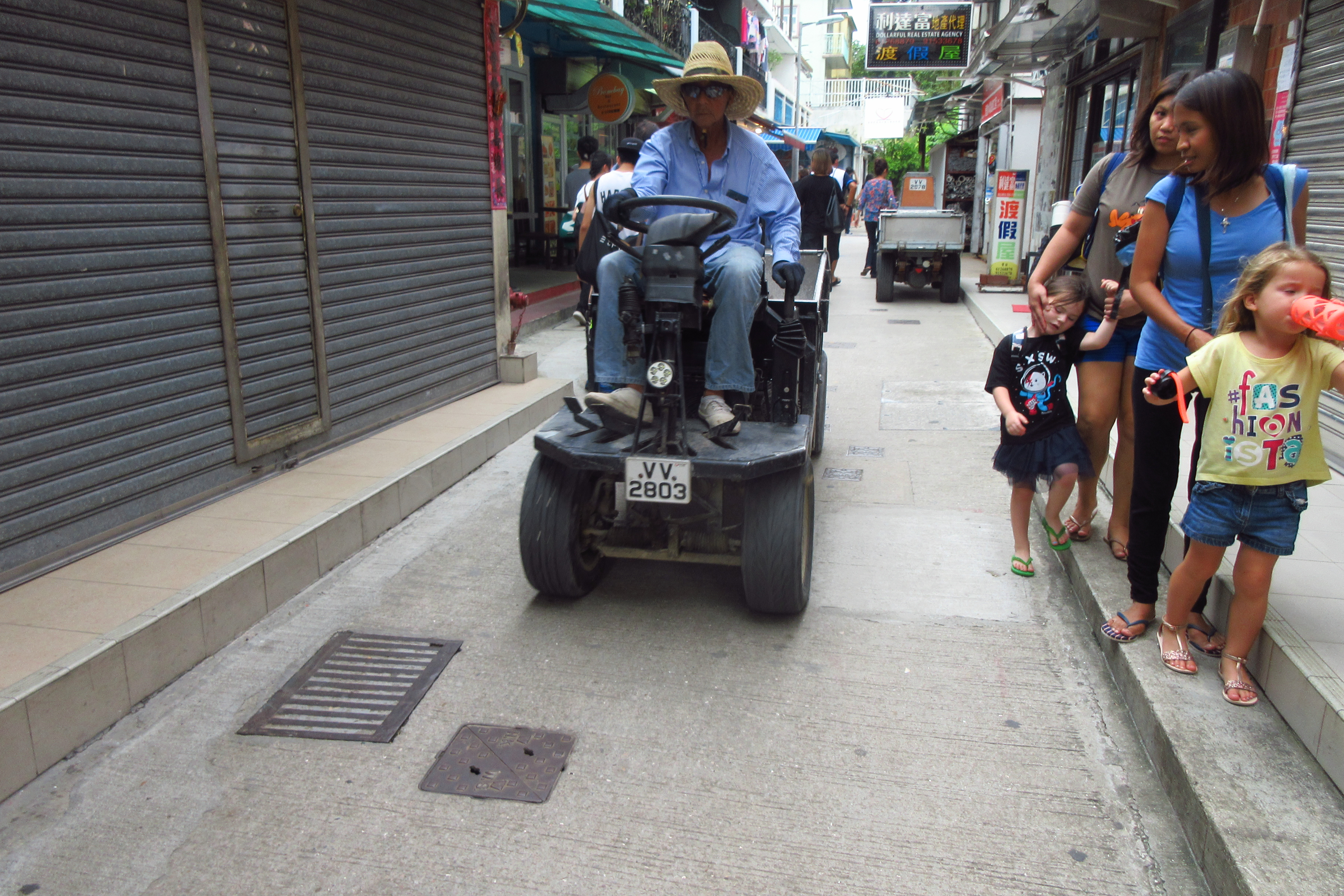
A man driving a village vehicle on Lamma Island in Hong Kong

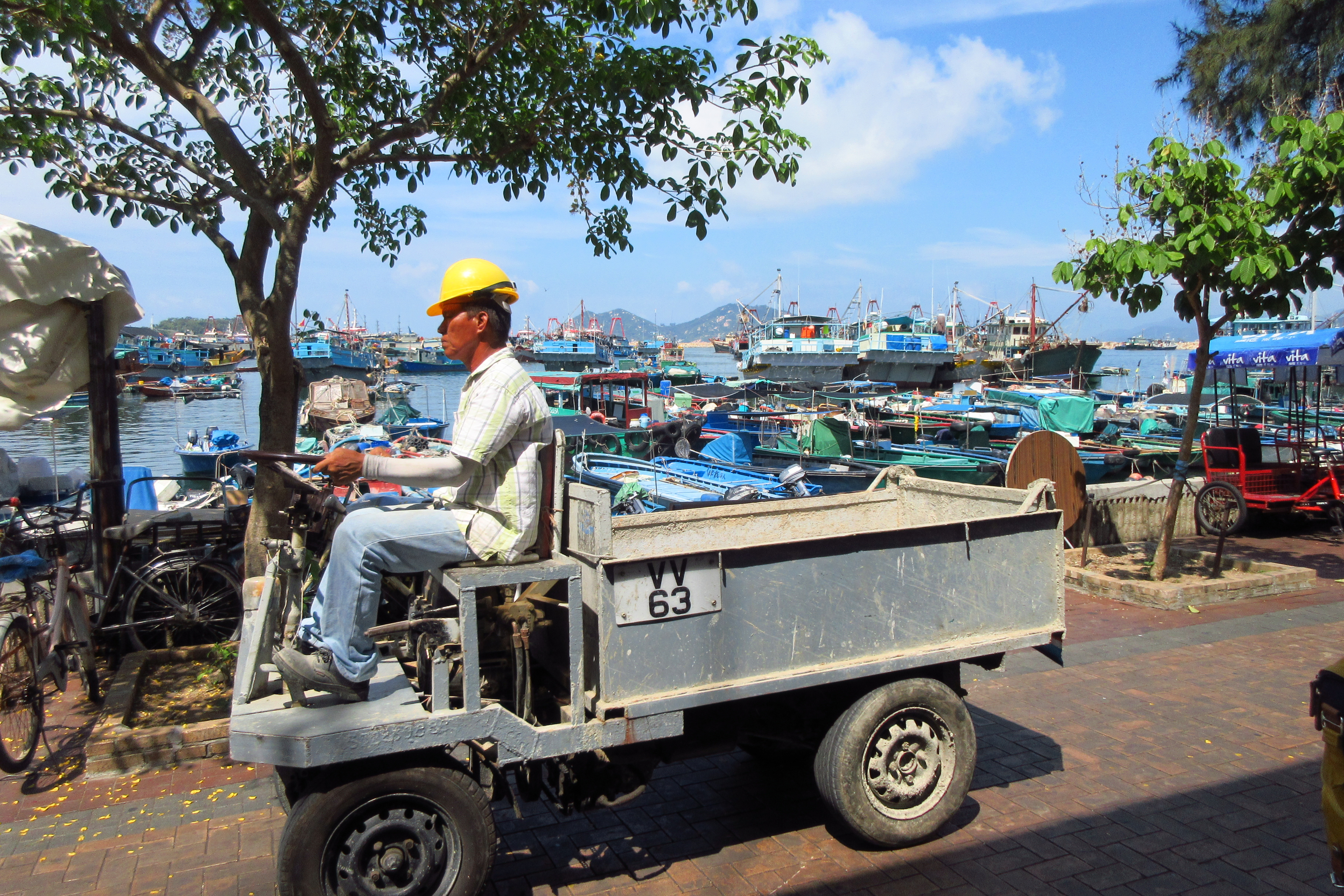
A village vehicle on the island of Cheung Chau in Hong Kong

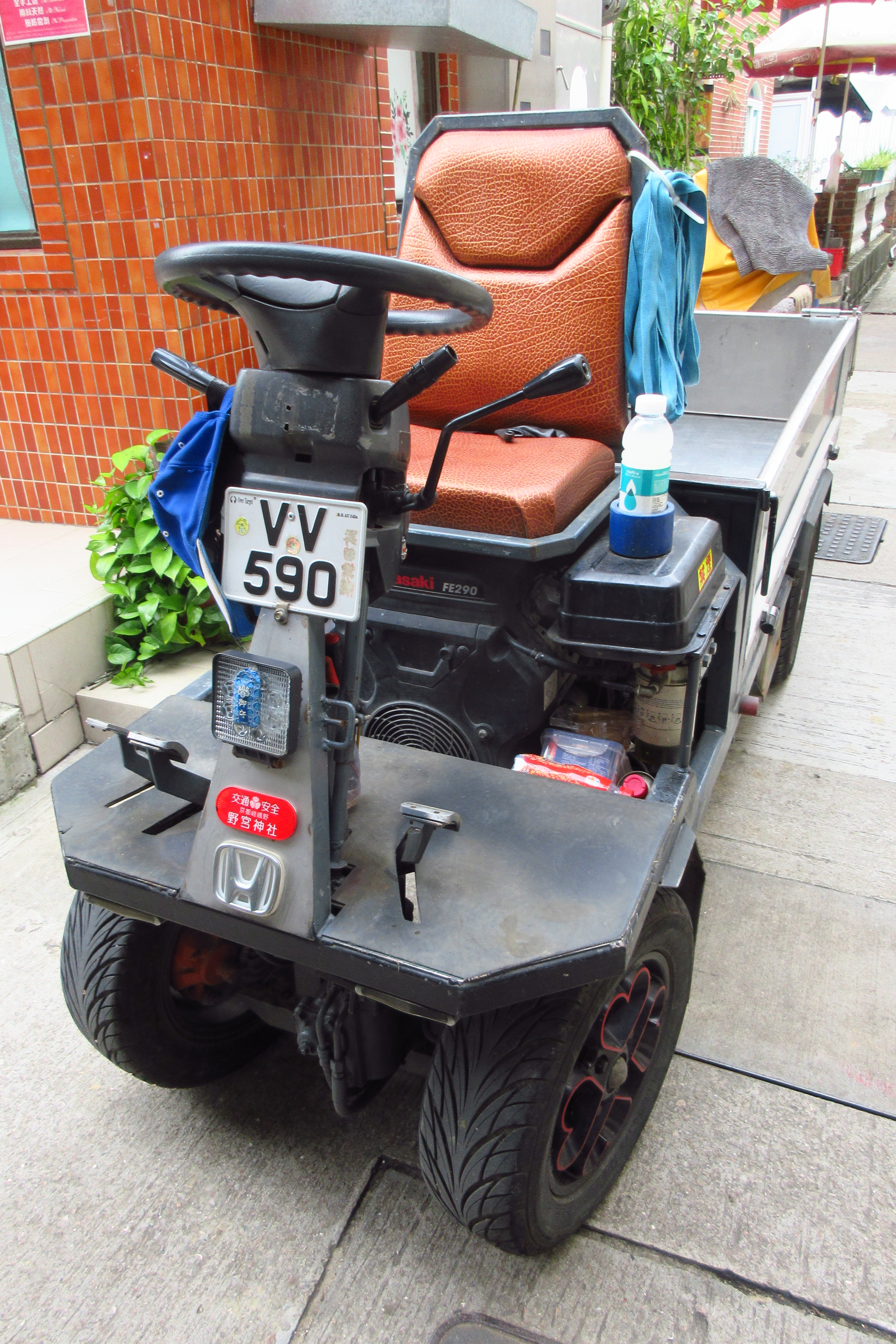
Front view of a village vehicle on Lamma Island.

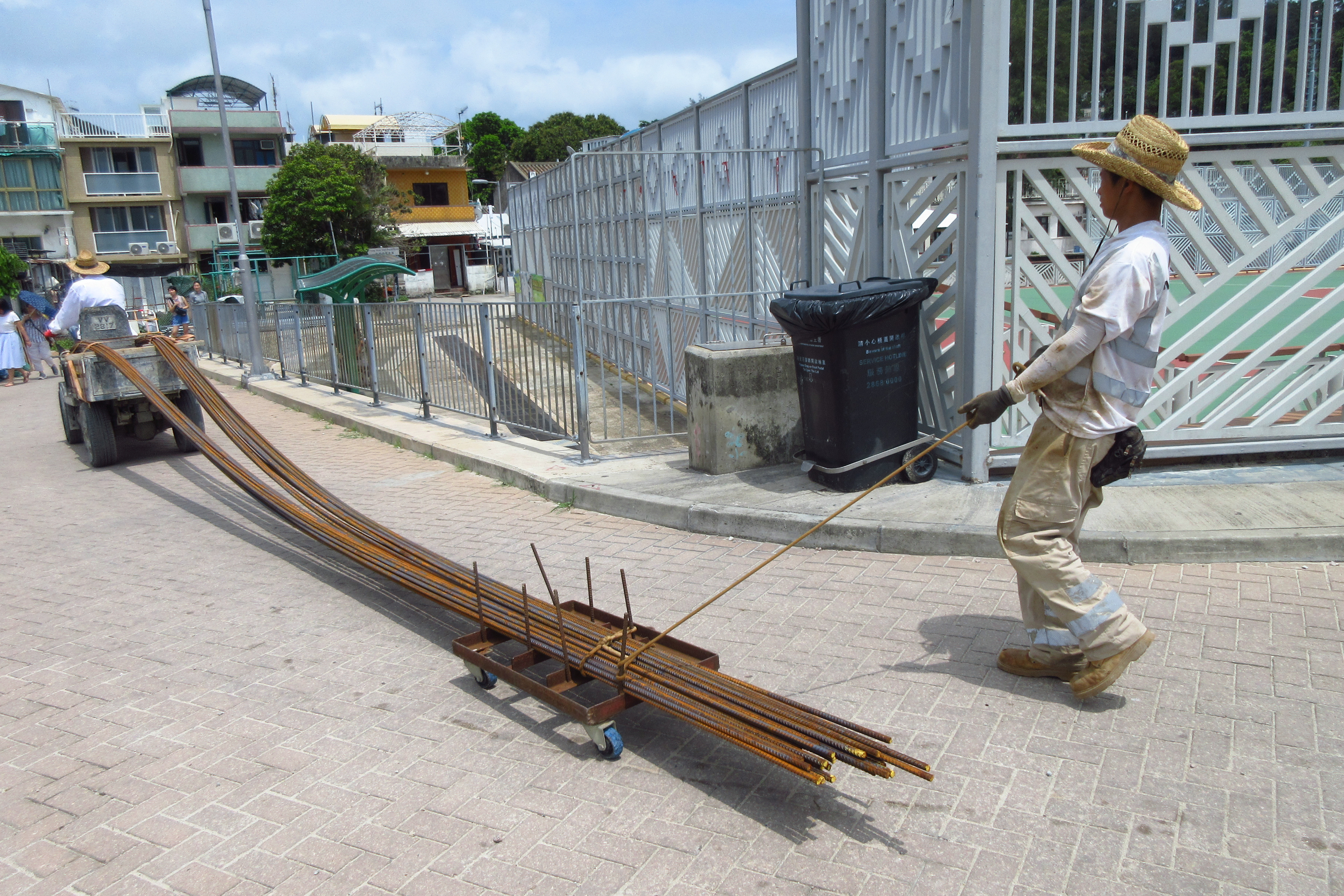
Transporting steel rebar using a village vehicle.
