= Cheung Chau =

Island in New Territories, Hong Kong

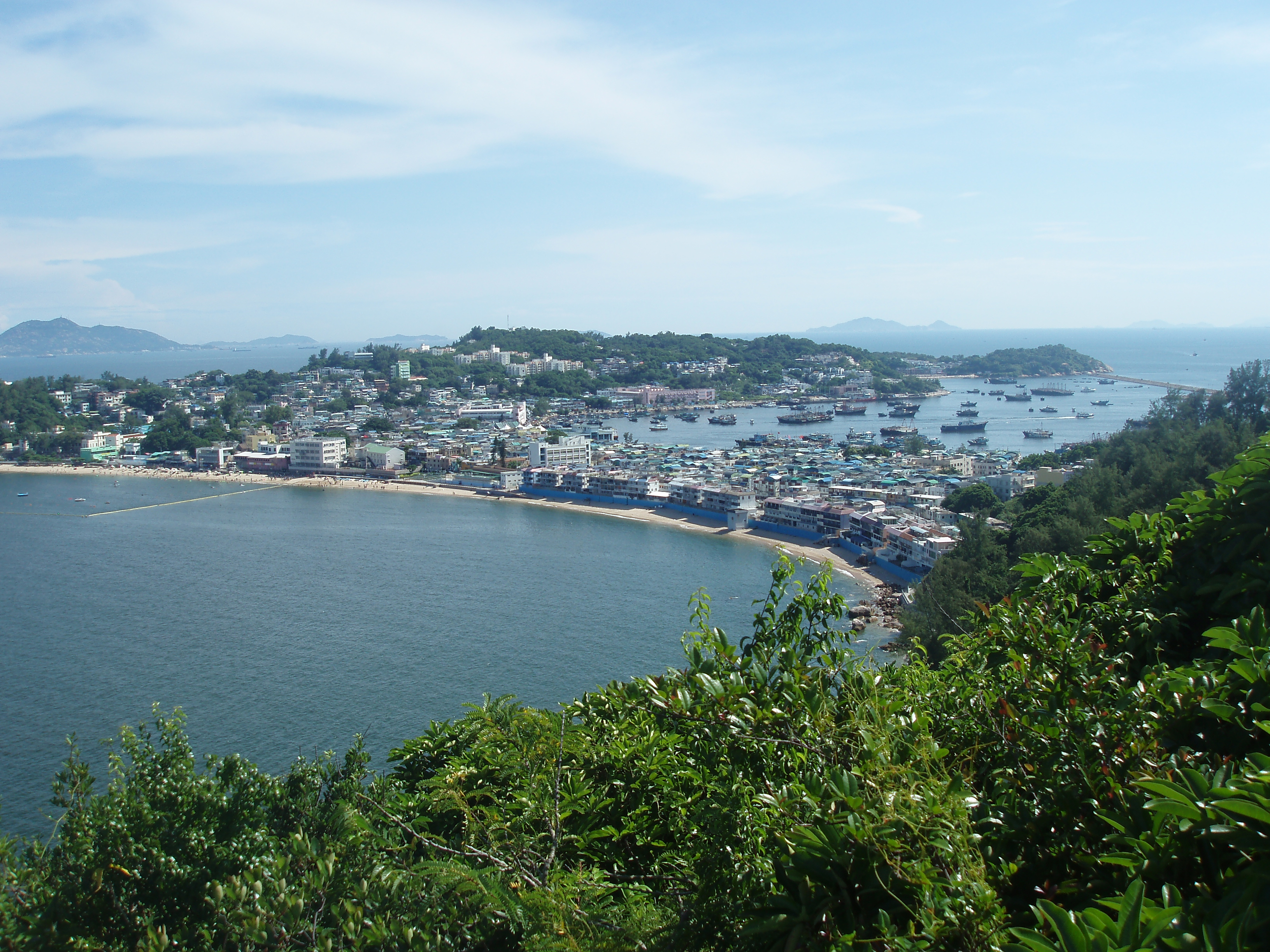
- Cheung Chau (2013)

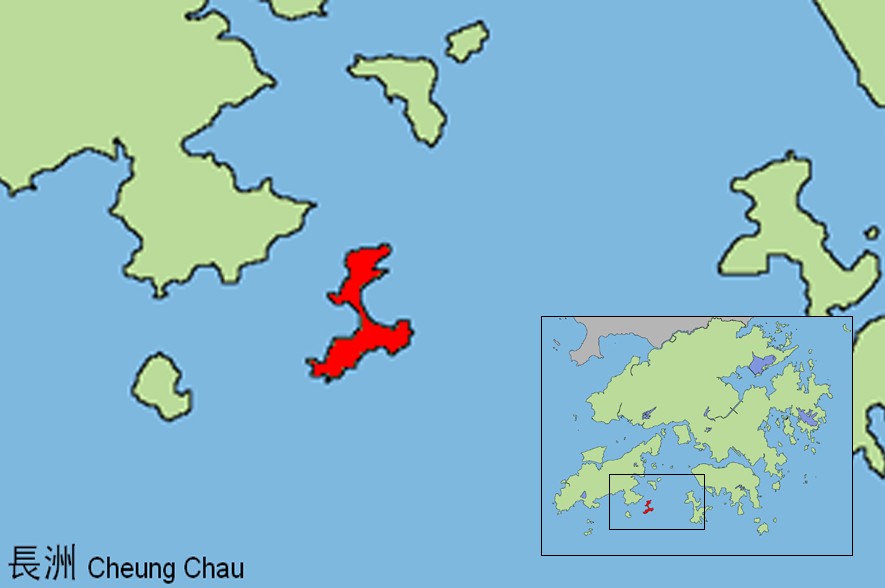

Geography
- Location: Southwest of Hong Kong
- Coordinates: 22°12′38″N 114°01′44″E
- Area: 2.46 km^{2} (0.95 sq mi)
- Highest elevation: 95 m (312 ft)

Administration
- Hong Kong
- District: Islands District

Demographics
- Population: 19,769 (2021)
- Pop. density: 9,882.93/km^{2} (25596.67/sq mi)
- Ethnic groups: Chinese (92.7%); Indonesian (2.0%); White (1.5%)

Cheung Chau
- Traditional Chinese: 長洲
- Simplified Chinese: 长洲
Transcriptions
Standard Mandarin
- Hanyu Pinyin: Chángzhōu
Yue: Cantonese
- Yale Romanization: Chèuhng jāu
- Jyutping: Coeng^{4} zau^{1}

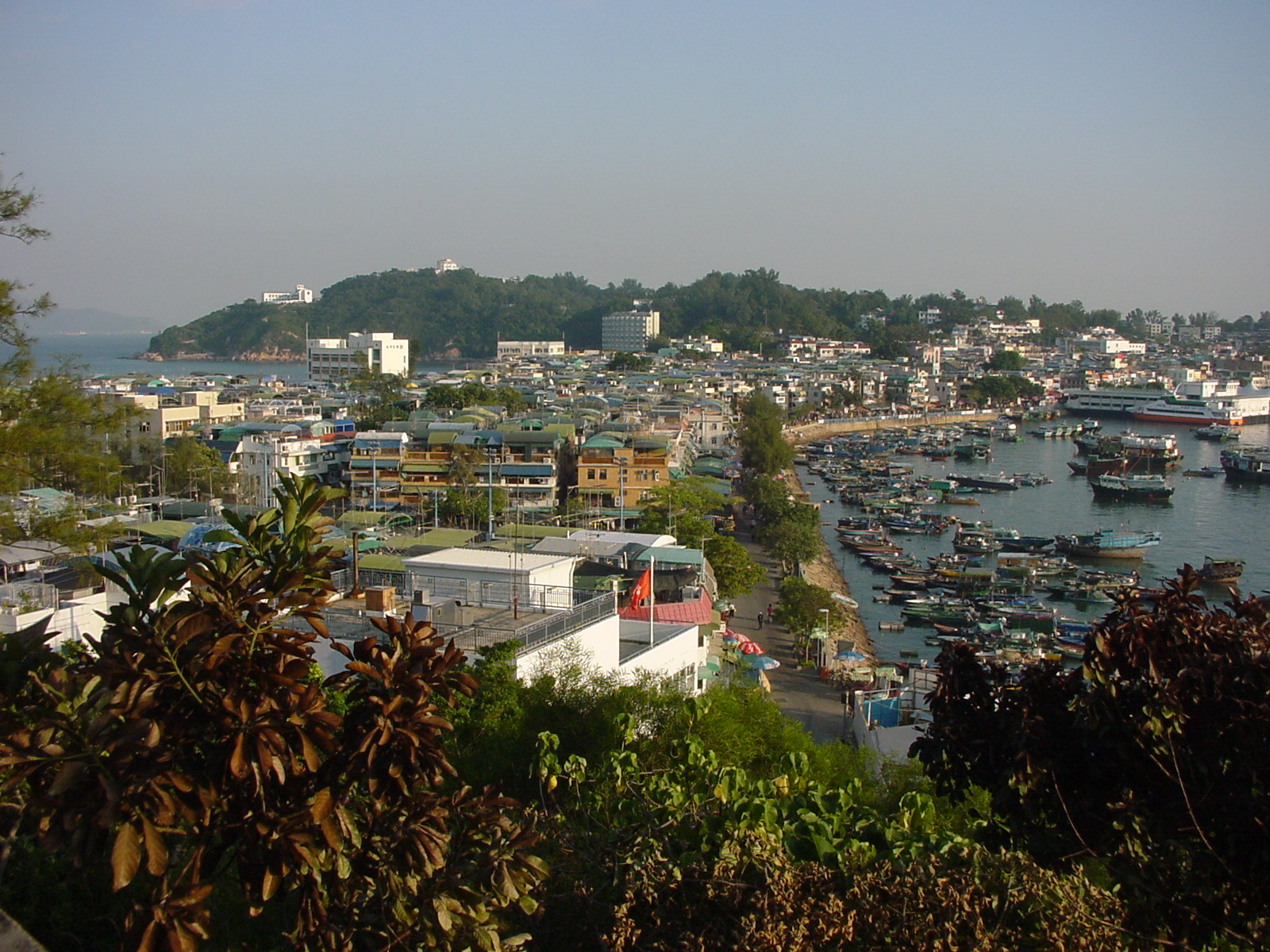
The village of Cheung Chau, viewed from the north. The bay of Tung Wan is on the left and Cheung Chau Typhoon Shelter is on the right.

Cheung Chau (Chinese: 長洲; lit. 'Long Island') is an outlying island of Hong Kong, located 10 km (6.2 mi) southwest of Hong Kong Island. It is also called Dumbbell Island (啞鈴島; aa2 ling4 dou2) due to its dumbbell-like shape. It has been inhabited for longer than most other places in Hong Kong, and had a population of 22,740 as of 2011. Administratively, it is part of the Islands District.

== Geography ==
Geographically the island is formed from two mostly granite masses joined by a tombolo. With an area of 2.45 square kilometres (0.95 square miles), the island is therefore "long", hence the name as translated from Cantonese is "Long Island". Thus, it is redundant to say "Cheung Chau Island". The island is dumbbell-shaped, with hills at the northern and southern ends and the settlements concentrated in between.

== Economy ==
The central part of the island is well-developed with shops and houses. The lane-ways are so narrow that normal motor traffic is impossible. Instead, there are small motorised trucks officially termed "village vehicles", which include specially designed mini-fire engines, ambulances and police cars.

Residential areas also exist on the hills of the north and south.

The island was traditionally a fishing village and still has fishing fleets working from the harbour. However, in recent years, the island has become a major tourist attraction, offering a mixture of sandy swimming beaches, seafood cafés, and traditional Chinese culture.

== History ==
In 1898, Cheung Chau was leased to the United Kingdom for 99 years (till 1997) under the Second Convention of Peking, alongside some 200 other outlying islands and the New Territories. The island thus became part of British Hong Kong.

At that time, the island was mainly a fishing village and had more residents living on junks than on land. Cheung Chau had already been settled by people from other places in Southern China; for example, Hoklo, they are mainly fishing people; Hakka people; Chiu Chau; and Yue Ca. The island slowly evolved into a commercial hub with merchants selling supplies to the local fishing people, boat repair and fishing gear as well as the place to do business for fishing people and small farmers of other nearby islands like Lantau Island.

At the time of the 1911 census, the population of Cheung Chau, both land and boat based, was 7,686. The number of males was 4,519.

From the late-1990s to the early-2000s, a spate of suicide cases (usually by charcoal-burning) took place inside rental holiday flats of the island's Bela Vista Villa on Tung Wan beach, seeing more than 25 suicide attempts and 20 deaths by 2008. Local newspapers soon dubbed the island "Death Island" and stories concerning apparitions appeared. In 2005, Islands District councillor Lam Kit-sing suggested converting the notorious villa into a macabre tourist attraction, proposing a "ghost town" with a "charcoal-burning museum", Halloween-style fairs, and "haunted" flats for people to stay in. The plans quickly received strong opposition from residents, villa owners, and his fellow councillors, including criticism that they might create copycat suicides.

== Sights ==
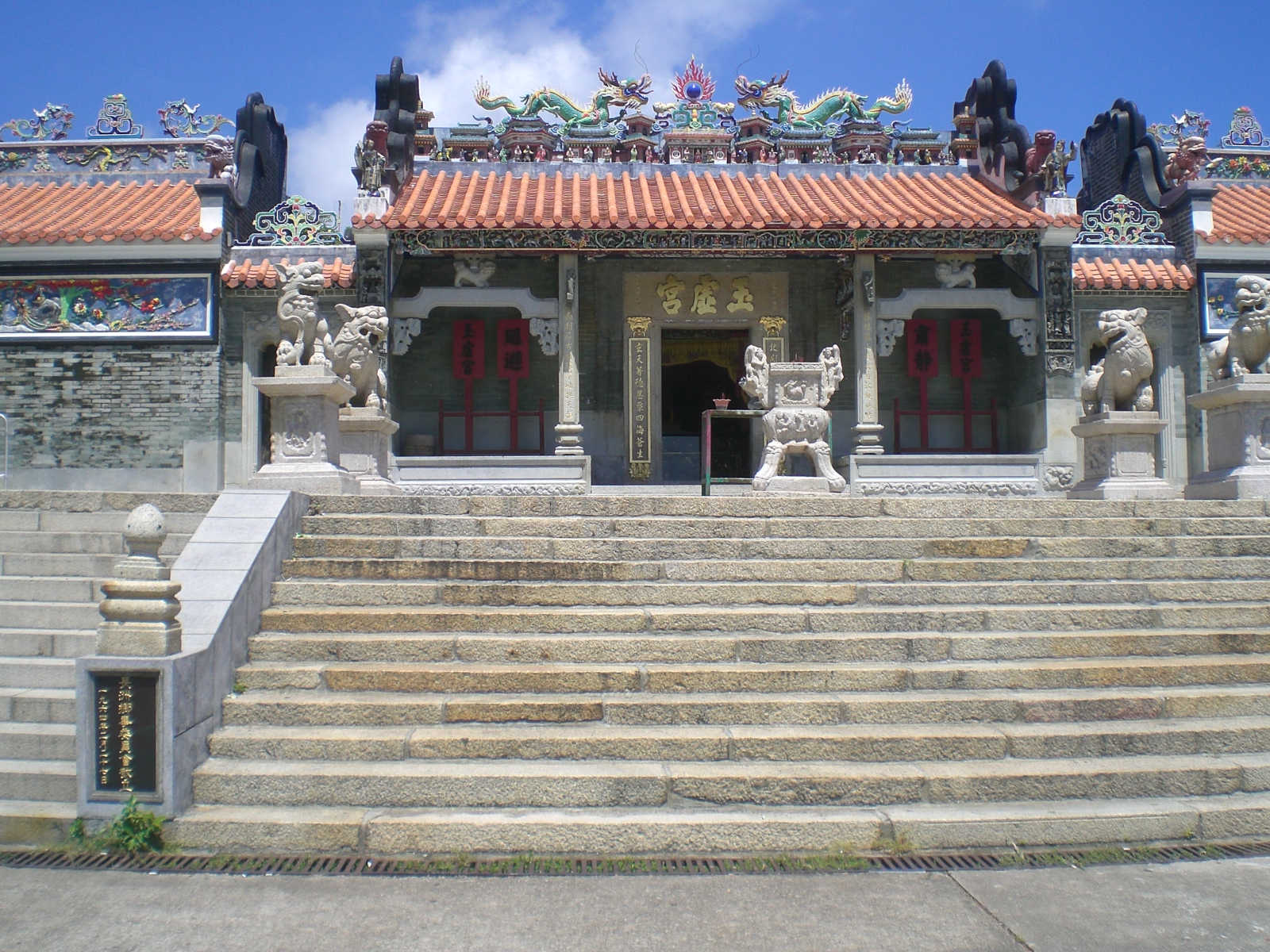
Pak Tai Temple

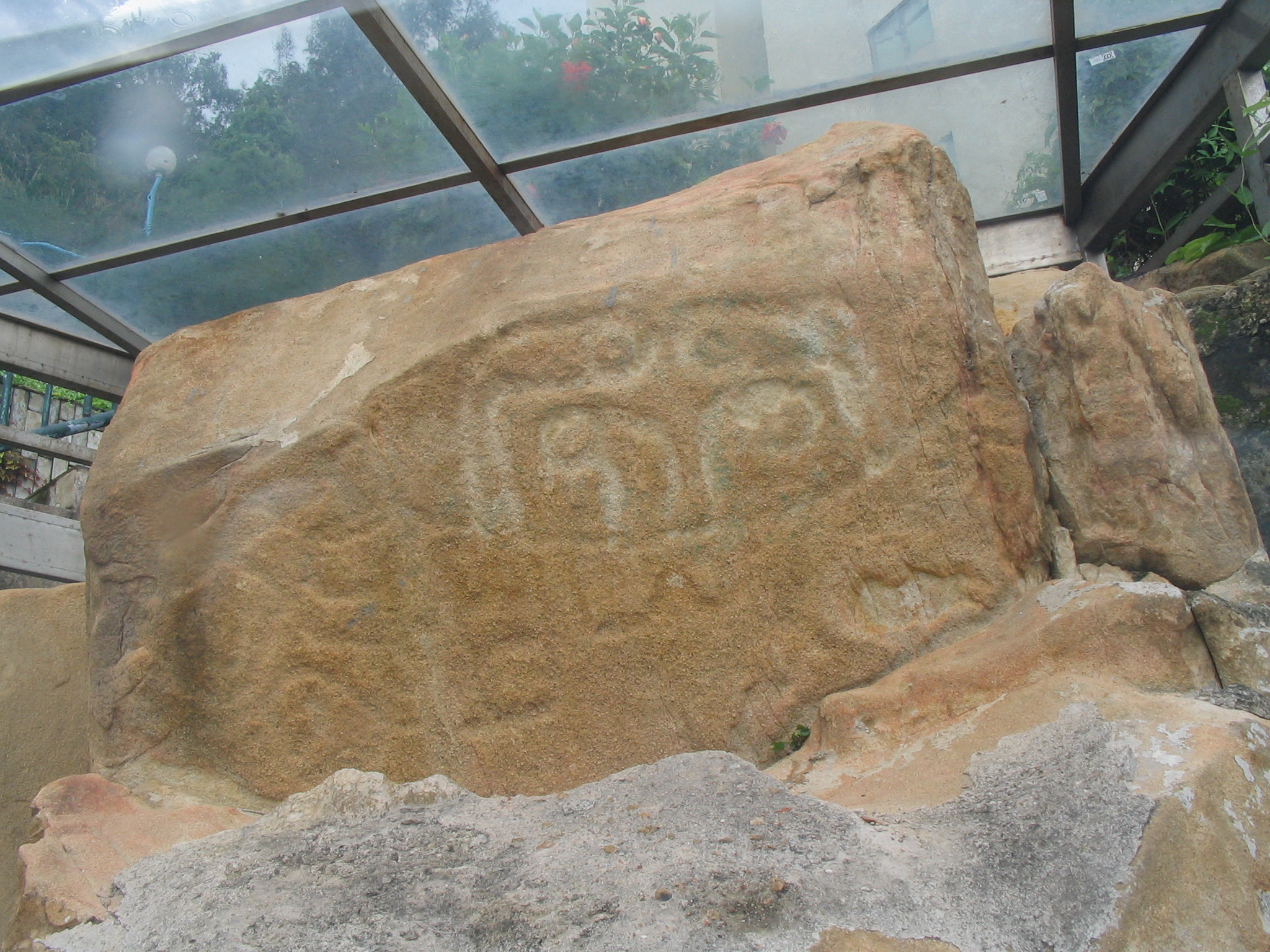
Rock Carving on Cheung Chau.

=== Temples ===
Temples on Cheung Chau include:

- Pak Tai Temple – one of the oldest temples in Hong Kong. The temple was built in 1783. It was demolished and completely rebuilt in 1989. In front of the temple, there are 4 pairs of guarding lions. Before the altar are statues of two generals, "Thousand Miles Eye" (千里眼) and "Favourable Wind Ear" (順風耳), who together are traditionally said to be able to hear and see everything
- Four temples dedicated to Tin Hau
- Hung Shing Temple. Built in 1993, it is managed by the Chinese Temples Committee.
- Kwan Kung Chung Yi Ting, a traditional temple built in 1973, dedicated to the god of justice Kwan Tai
- Kwun Yam Temple (觀音廟) aka. Shui Yuet Temple (水月宮) aka. Chi Kung (子宮), near Kwun Yam Wan beach. Built before 1840, and dedicated to Guanyin (Kwun Yam), it gave its name to the nearby bay Kwun Yam Wan.

=== Others ===
- Tung Wan and Kwun Yam Wan beaches
- Rock carvings located near Tung Wan Beach were reported by geologists in 1970, and are declared monuments of Hong Kong. This 3000-year-old rock carving is located on the east of the island, immediately below the Warwick Hotel. It consists of two groups of similar carved lines surrounding small depressions.
- Cheung Po Tsai Cave, alleged to be the hiding place of Cheung Po Tsai, a 19th-century pirate
- Cheung Chau Mini Great Wall, a hiking trail
- Cheung Chau Theatre, a former cinema

== Hospitals ==
The island of Cheung Chau has one operating hospital and one abandoned hospital.

=== St. John Hospital ===
St. John Hospital, also known as Haw Par Hospital, was founded in 1934 by Hong Kong St. John Ambulance and has been the island's main hospital since 1988.

=== The Cheung Chau Fong Bin Hospital (closed) ===
The Cheung Chau Fong Bin Hospital (長洲方便醫院; 'Cheung Chau Convenience Hospital') was established in 1872. It was originally called the Asylum (棲留所) and was not a hospital in the modern sense, in that it did not provide medical care and only functioned as a refuge for poor homeless patients to die in peace and dignity and as a mortuary for those killed in shipwrecks.

In 1915, the Asylum was expanded by a local kaifong association known as the Cheung Chau Kai Fong Hui (長洲街坊會), and was subsequently renamed The Cheung Chau Fong Bin Hospital. The word Fong Bin (方便), meaning "convenience", suggested that the hospital was meant to serve the medical needs of all. Substantial renovations took place in 1931 and 1951 to meet the rising demand for medical care in Cheung Chau and nearby outlying islands.

In 1945, the ownership of the hospital was transferred to the Cheung Chau Residents' Association (長洲居民協會). It was staffed by reputable doctors trained in traditional Chinese medicine, and provided cheap and quality medical treatment that even attracted patients from other outlying islands.

Since the 1934 opening of the St. John Hospital, which provides Western medicine, the Fong Bin Hospital had been slowly fading away. It ultimately fell into disuse and complete abandonment in 1988.

The hospital has been listed as a Grade III historic building since 31 August 2010.

== Culture ==
=== Festivals ===
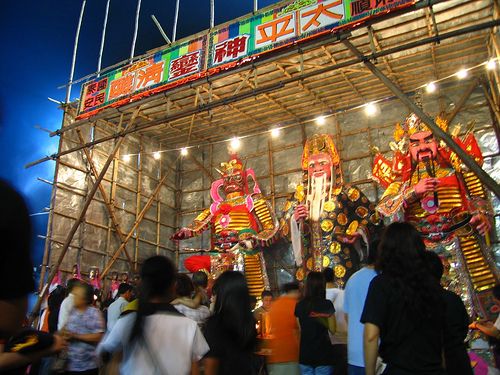
Temporary altar built during the Cheung Chau Bun Festival.

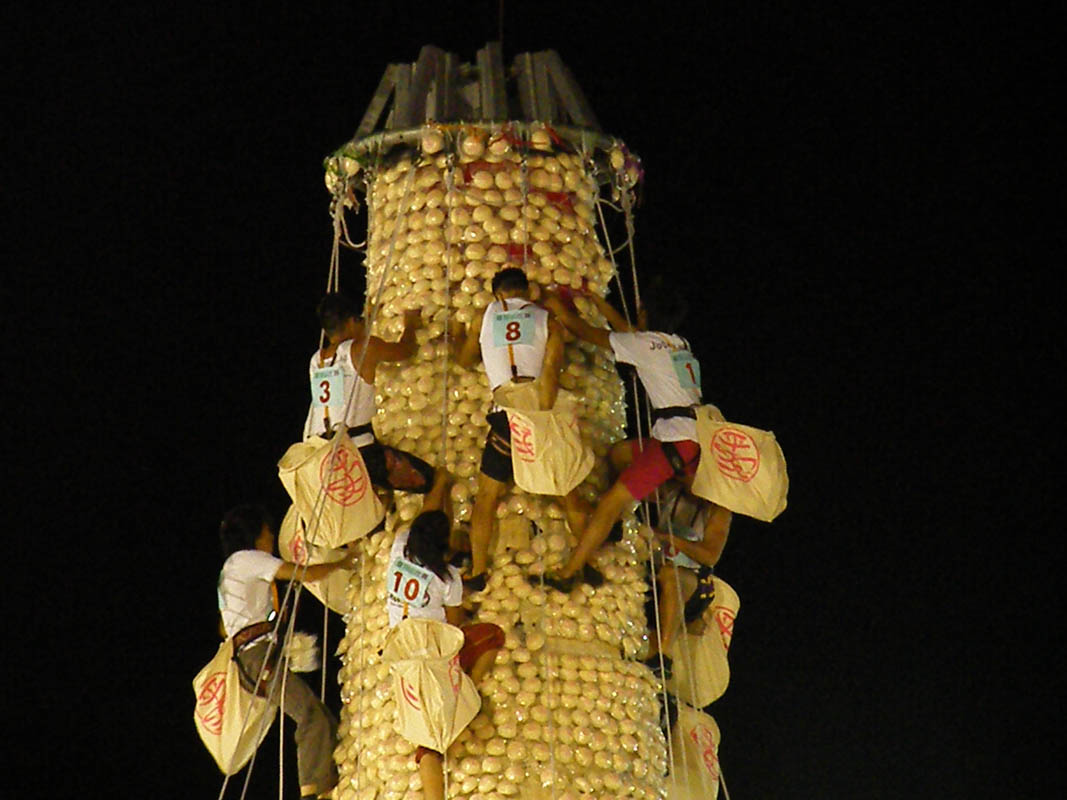
Bun Scrambling Competition 2010

| Date (Chinese Lunar Calendar) | Festival |
|---|---|
| 1st day of 1st month | Lunar New Year |
| 15th day of 1st month | Lantern Festival |
| 3rd day of 3rd month | Yuen Mo's Birthday |
| 18th day of 3rd month | Birthday of Tin Hau |
| 8th day of 4th month | Bun Festival |
| 5th day of 5th month | Tuen Ng Festival (Dragon Boat Festival) |
| 24th day of 6th month | Birthday of Kwan Tai |
| 15th day of 8th month | Mid-Autumn Festival |

=== Bun Festival ===
The annual Cheung Chau Bun Festival is a festival which includes a parade of floats, most famously including young children dressed as famous characters doing impossible balancing acts. It lasts three to four days and attracts tens of thousands of visitors to the island.

== Education ==
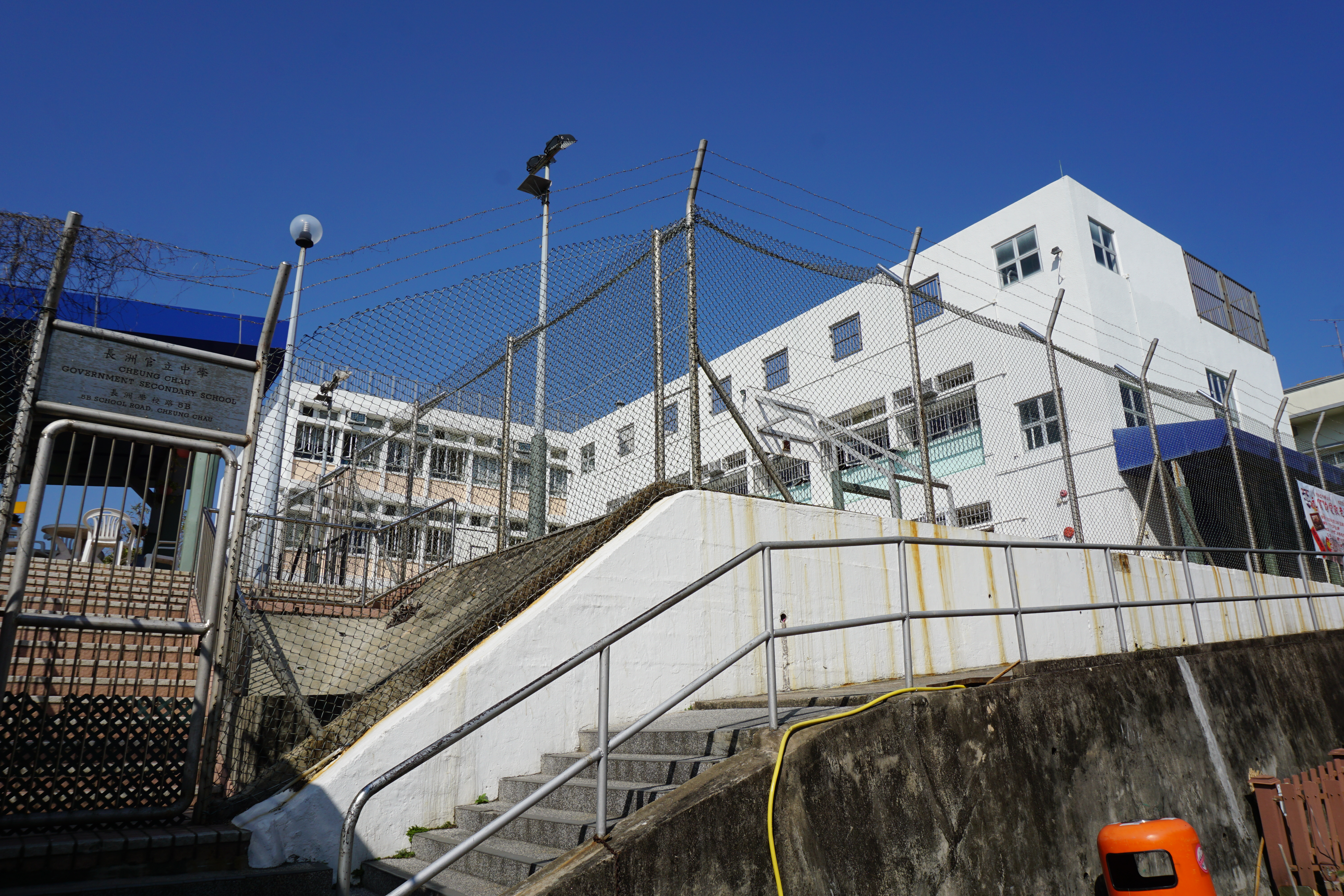
Cheung Chau Government Secondary School

As of 2019, there are three primary schools in Cheung Chau, including C.C.C. Cheung Chau Church Kam Kong Primary School (中華基督教會長洲堂錦江小學), Cheung Chau Sacred Heart School (長洲聖心學校), and Kwok Man School (國民學校), and two secondary schools : Buddhist Wai Yan Memorial College and Cheung Chau Government Secondary School. Formerly there were 7 primary schools including the Fisheries Joint Association Public School, Shun Dal Primary School and The Cheung Chau Government Primary School and three secondary schools including the now closed Caritas Saint Paul's Secondary School. Although there are more people living on Cheung Chau now than ever, the fertility rate throughout Hong Kong has dropped significantly leading to many school closings throughout the city.

Cheung Chau in Primary One Admission (POA) School Net 97. Within the school net are the three aided schools (operated independently but funded with government money) on Cheung Chau; no government schools are in this net.

Hong Kong Public Libraries operates Cheng Chau Public Library.

== Notable people ==
- Lee Lai-shan, a windsurfer who won Hong Kong's first Olympic gold medal in the 1996 Summer Olympics. That Olympic gold was also Hong Kong's last Olympic medal, as in 1997 Hong Kong became a Special Administrative Region of the People's Republic of China and now competes in the Olympics as Hong Kong, China.
- Vincent Lee Kwun Leung (李冠良), a visual artist
- Kong-Kwan Cheung, First Principal of Cheung Chau Fisheries Joint Association Public School

== Climate ==
Climate data for Cheung Chau (1993–2020)
| Month | Jan | Feb | Mar | Apr | May | Jun | Jul | Aug | Sep | Oct | Nov | Dec | Year |
|---|---|---|---|---|---|---|---|---|---|---|---|---|---|
| Record high °C (°F) | 28.4 (83.1) | 29.6 (85.3) | 30.6 (87.1) | 34.6 (94.3) | 34.6 (94.3) | 34.2 (93.6) | 37.0 (98.6) | 35.9 (96.6) | 36.1 (97.0) | 33.8 (92.8) | 33.2 (91.8) | 28.9 (84.0) | 37.0 (98.6) |
| Mean daily maximum °C (°F) | 19.7 (67.5) | 20.1 (68.2) | 22.2 (72.0) | 25.5 (77.9) | 28.7 (83.7) | 30.3 (86.5) | 30.9 (87.6) | 30.8 (87.4) | 30.3 (86.5) | 28.8 (83.8) | 25.6 (78.1) | 21.5 (70.7) | 26.2 (79.2) |
| Daily mean °C (°F) | 16.0 (60.8) | 16.6 (61.9) | 18.9 (66.0) | 22.3 (72.1) | 25.5 (77.9) | 27.3 (81.1) | 27.8 (82.0) | 27.6 (81.7) | 27.0 (80.6) | 25.0 (77.0) | 21.8 (71.2) | 17.6 (63.7) | 22.8 (73.0) |
| Mean daily minimum °C (°F) | 13.6 (56.5) | 14.4 (57.9) | 16.8 (62.2) | 20.2 (68.4) | 23.5 (74.3) | 25.4 (77.7) | 25.8 (78.4) | 25.6 (78.1) | 24.9 (76.8) | 22.9 (73.2) | 19.4 (66.9) | 15.1 (59.2) | 20.6 (69.1) |
| Record low °C (°F) | 1.9 (35.4) | 4.3 (39.7) | 6.4 (43.5) | 10.3 (50.5) | 15.7 (60.3) | 19.7 (67.5) | 21.8 (71.2) | 22.1 (71.8) | 19.8 (67.6) | 14.7 (58.5) | 8.3 (46.9) | 4.5 (40.1) | 1.9 (35.4) |
| Average precipitation mm (inches) | 28.3 (1.11) | 32.1 (1.26) | 54.7 (2.15) | 121.5 (4.78) | 241.8 (9.52) | 352.7 (13.89) | 248.9 (9.80) | 327.4 (12.89) | 197.4 (7.77) | 51.5 (2.03) | 29.3 (1.15) | 16.9 (0.67) | 1,702.5 (67.02) |
| Average rainy days (≥ 0.5 mm) | 3.7 | 5.5 | 7.3 | 8.6 | 11.8 | 16.3 | 15.6 | 14.6 | 10.5 | 4.1 | 3.5 | 4.0 | 105.4 |
| Average relative humidity (%) | 75.7 | 81.0 | 84.0 | 86.8 | 88.3 | 90.5 | 89.6 | 88.8 | 83.8 | 75.8 | 74.5 | 71.4 | 82.5 |
Source: Hong Kong Observatory (precipitation 1996–2020, rainy days 1993–2016)

== Transport ==
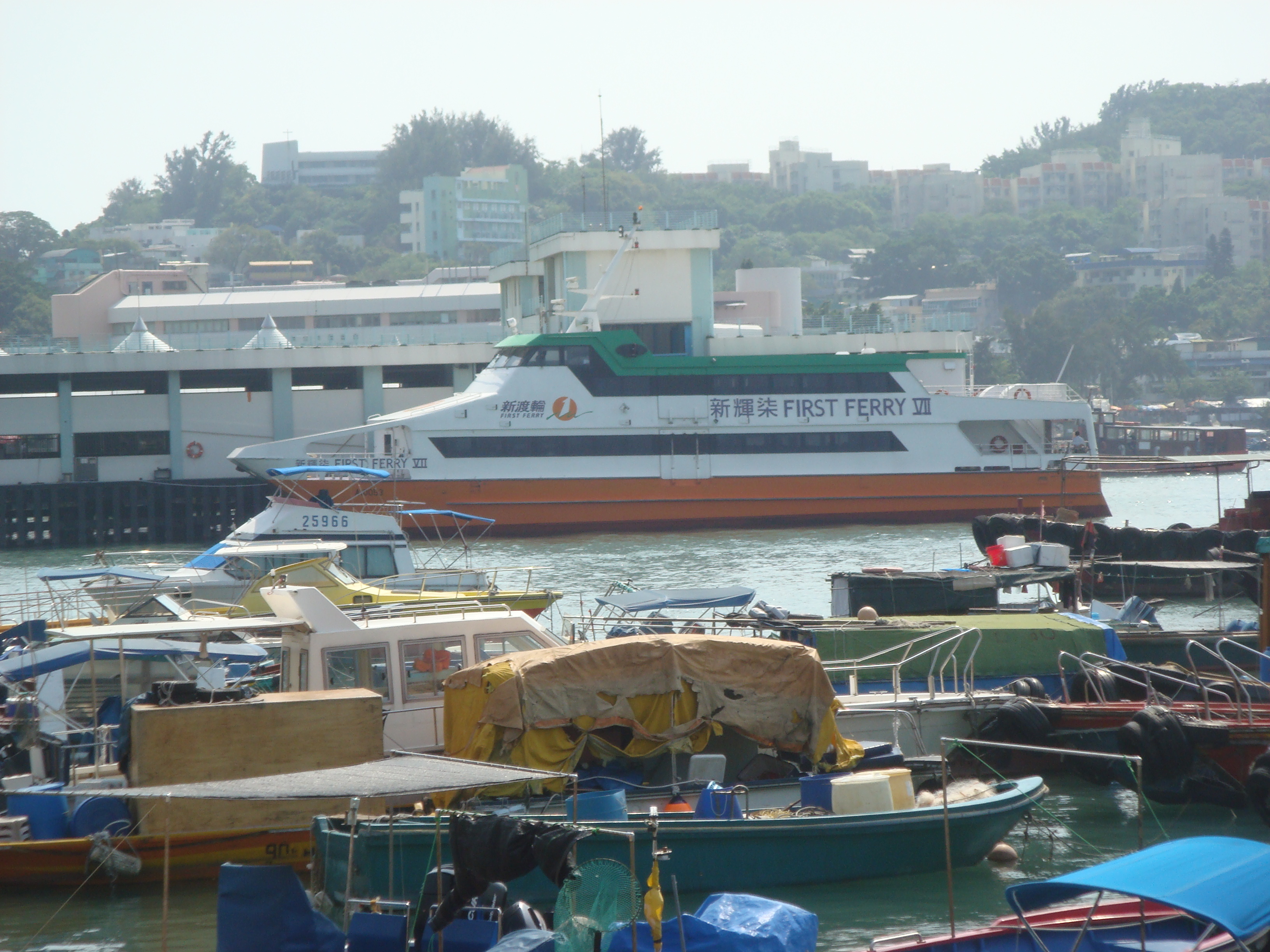
A First Ferry ferry at Cheung Chau Ferry Pier, within Cheung Chau typhoon shelter.

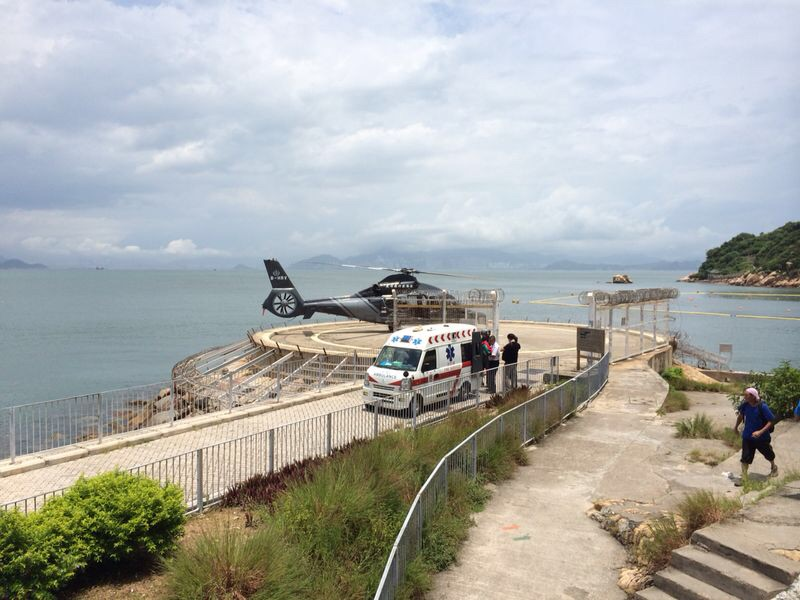
Medical evacuation by helicopter from Cheung Chau's helipad

Sun Ferry operates ferries between Central pier number 5 and Cheung Chau. The ferries run approximately every 30 minutes depending upon time of day. Schedules on Sundays and public holidays differ from weekdays. The trip of about 20 kilometres (12 miles) takes 55 minutes for ordinary ferries or 35 minutes for high speed ferries. Cheung Chau also has a ferry service to other outlying islands and regions such as Mui Wo and Chi Ma Wan.

Due to inaccessibility to cars and other vehicles, most residents use bicycles for personal transportation. A number of bicycle rental shops near the ferry pier rent bicycles to tourists. The only motor vehicles on the island are those used by the emergency services, as well as village vehicles used to transport goods.

== Law enforcement ==
The Hong Kong Police Force operates the Cheung Chau Division.

== In popular culture ==
- The 2001 Hong Kong film Troublesome Night 10 was set in Cheung Chau.
- The 2001 Hong Kong animated feature film My Life as McDull mentions Cheung-Chau-born windsurfer Lee Lai-shan and depicts its lead character McDull learning Cheung Chau bun-snatching.
- The 2002 Hong Kong film Just One Look was set in Cheung Chau, starring Twins, Shawn Yue and Wong You Nam.
- The 2010 Hong Kong film The Fantastic Water Babes was set in Cheung Chau, starring Gillian Chung, Alex Fong and Eva Huang.

== See also ==
- Beaches of Hong Kong
- List of islands and peninsulas of Hong Kong
- List of places in Hong Kong
