= Central Piers =

Ferry piers in Hong Kong

Coordinates: 22°17′14″N 114°09′33″E

Central Ferry Piers
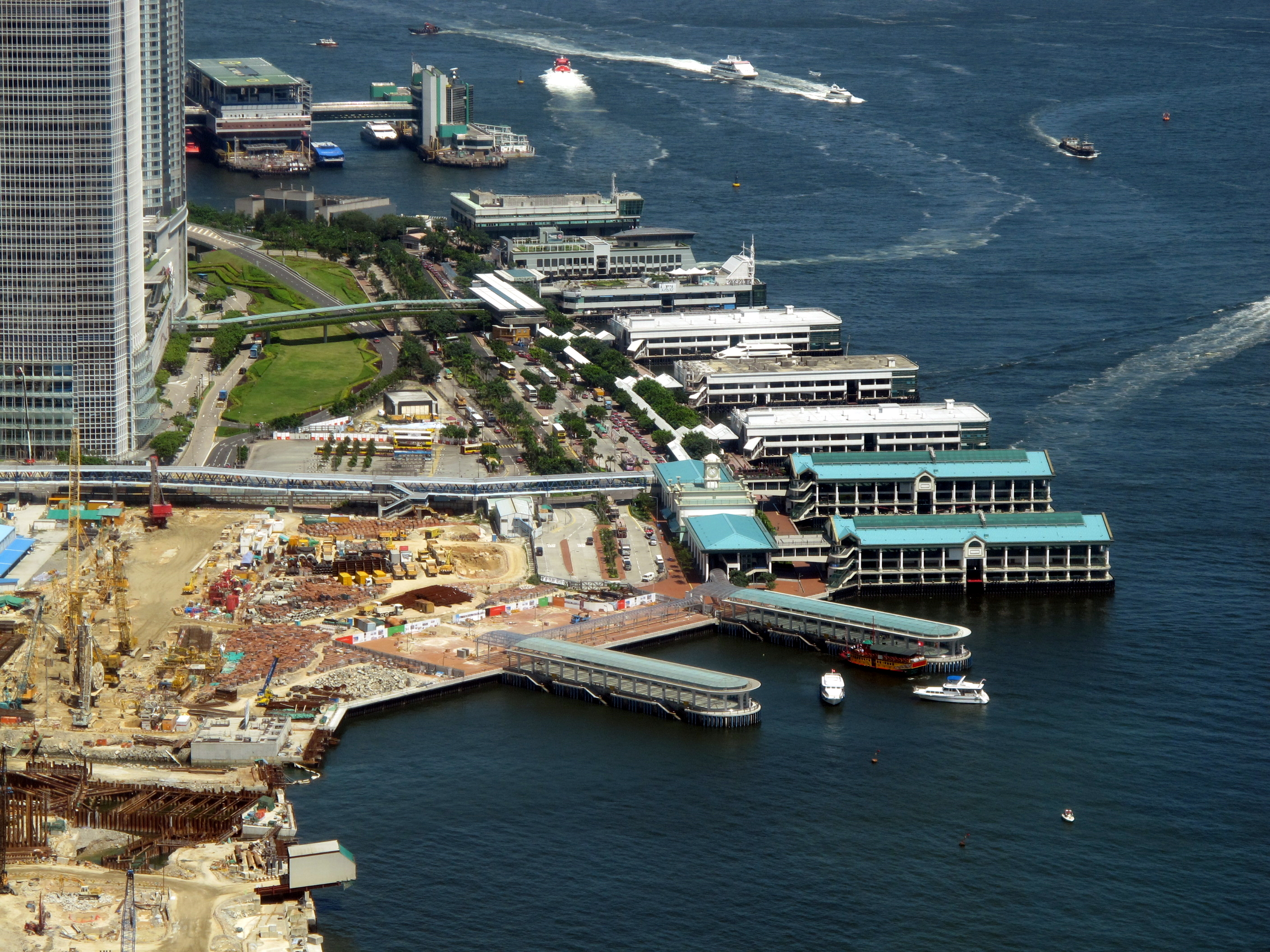
- View of the Central Ferry Piers in July 2010
- Traditional Chinese: 中環碼頭
- Simplified Chinese: 中环码头
Transcriptions
Standard Mandarin
- Hanyu Pinyin: Zhōnghuán Mǎtóu
Yue: Cantonese
- Jyutping: Zung1 waan4 maa5 tau4

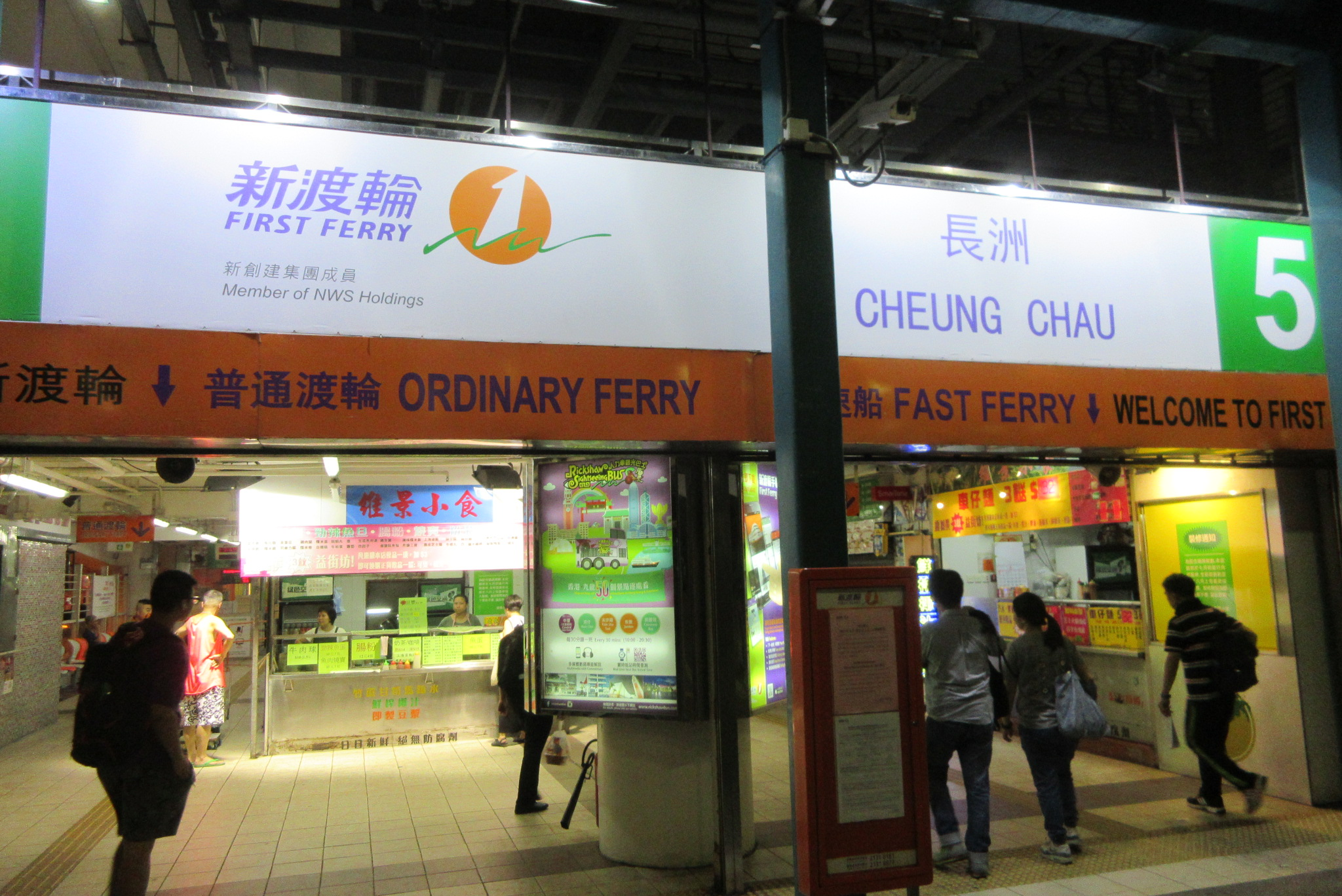
Entrance of Pier 5 to Cheung Chau in June 2017

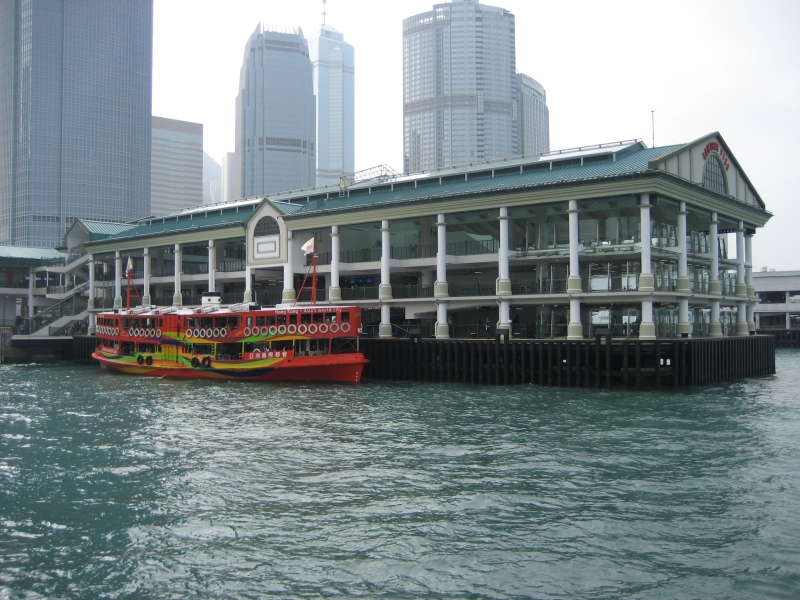
Pier 7: Star Ferry to Tsim Sha Tsui: One of the "finger piers" of Central Piers. Taken in November 2006

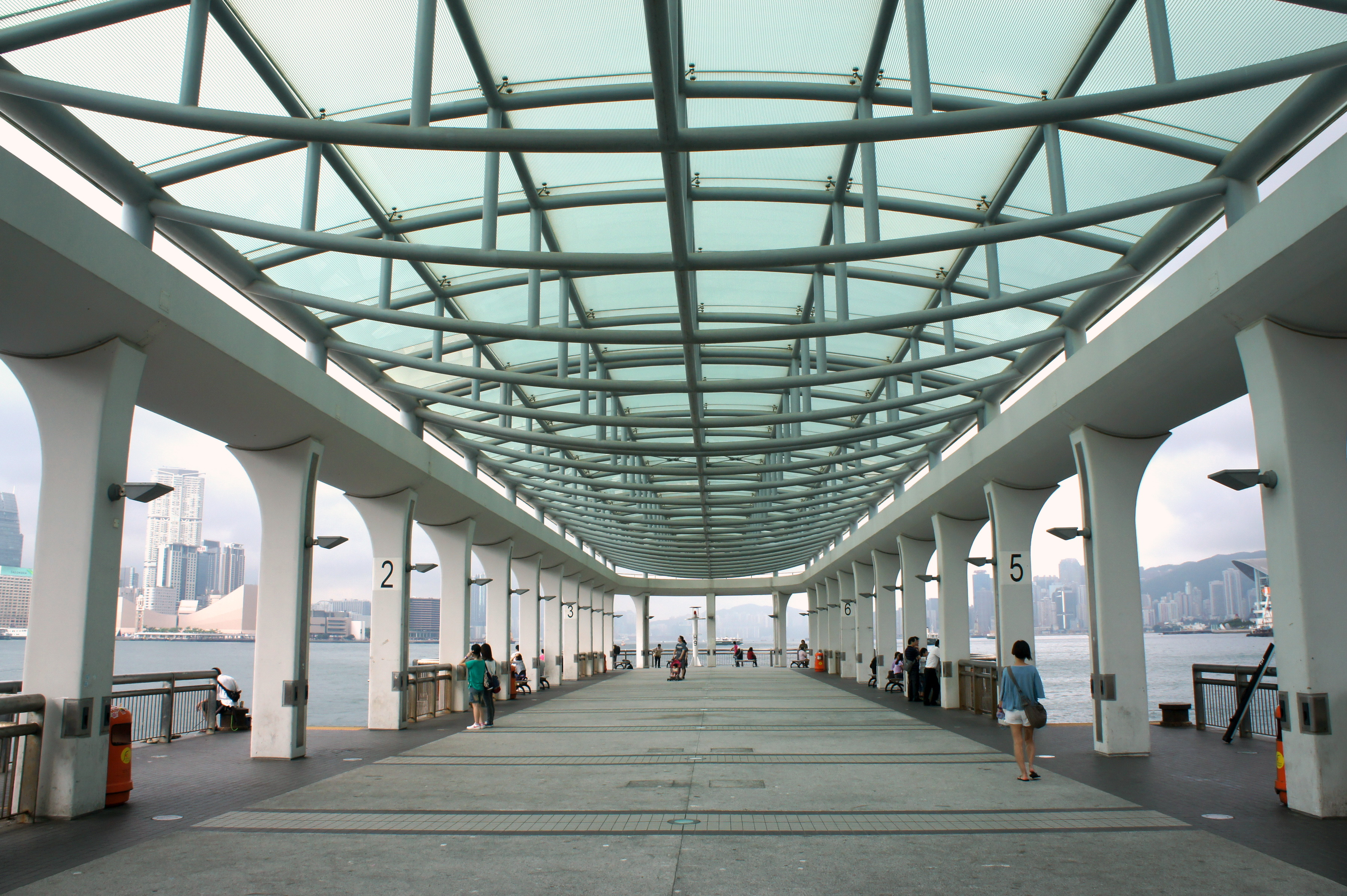
Pier 9: Public Pier. Taken in May 2012

The Central Ferry Piers (Chinese: 中環碼頭) are situated on the northeast part of Central, Hong Kong Island. The ferries mostly depart to Outlying Islands in the New Territories, with the exception of Pier 1 serving as a government pier, and ferries from piers 7 and 8 going to Kowloon.

== History ==
The current piers were all built in the 1990s and early 2000s due to the Airport Core Programme, under which the Central Reclamation was built to provide land for Hong Kong station, the terminus of the new airport railway. The previous piers had to be demolished to make way for the newly reclaimed land. The first set of new piers opened on 9 May 1995.

== Ferry services ==
The destinations or uses of the piers are as follows:

- Pier 1: Government of Hong Kong
- Pier 2: Park Island
- Pier 3: Discovery Bay
- Pier 4: Lamma Island, with the western pier going to Sok Kwu Wan and the eastern pier to Yung Shue Wan.
- Pier 5: Cheung Chau
- Pier 6: Western pier: Peng Chau – Eastern pier: Mui Wo
- Pier 7: Star Ferry service to Tsim Sha Tsui
- Pier 8: Hong Kong Maritime Museum and Fortune Ferry service to Hung Hom
- Pier 9: Public Pier
- Pier 10: Public Pier

Star Ferry Pier, Central is a "movable name", which now refers to the "fourth generation" Star Ferry pier, aka Pier 7 in Central.

== Former piers ==
- Blake Pier, demolished 1993
- Edinburgh Place Ferry Pier, "third generation" Star Ferry pier, abandoned in November 2006, demolition completed early 2007
- Queen's Pier, Edinburgh Place, was completely demolished in February 2008
- United Pier, also known as Jubilee Pier, demolished 1994

== See also ==
- Outlying Islands Ferry Pier
