= Discovery Bay Transportation Services =

Transport company providing ferry and bus services to Discovery Bay, Hong Kong

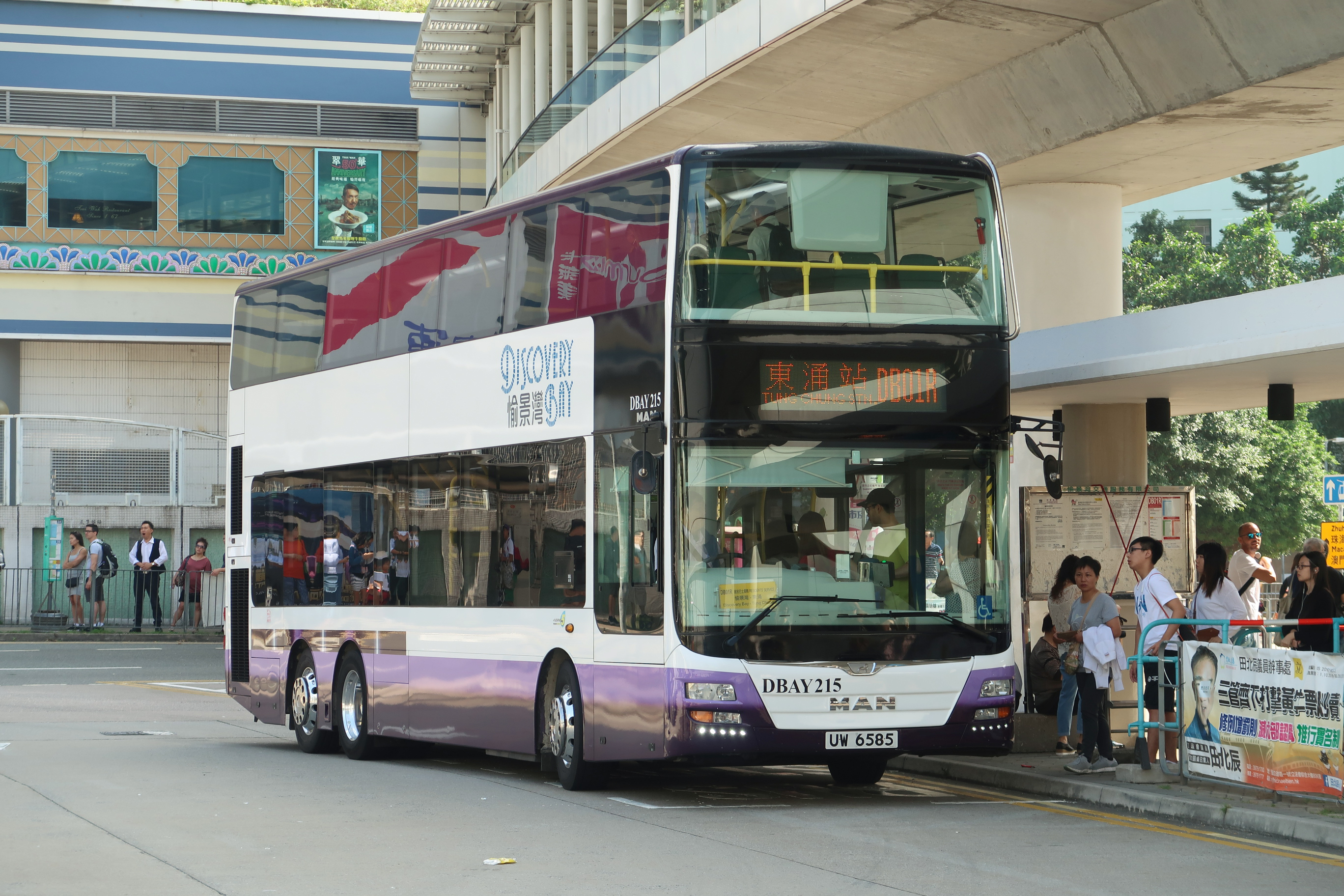
- A MAN A95 running Route DB01R
- Company type: Subsidiary
- Industry: Transport
- Founded: 1981; 45 years ago
- Headquarters: Discovery Bay, Lantau Island, Hong Kong
- Products: Ferry, Bus
- Parent: HKR International

Chinese name
- Traditional Chinese: 愉景灣交通服務有限公司
- Simplified Chinese: 愉景湾交通服务有限公司
Transcriptions
Standard Mandarin
- Hanyu Pinyin: yú jǐng wān jiāo tōng fú wù yǒu xiàn gōng sī
Yue: Cantonese
- Jyutping: jyu4 ging2 waan1 gaau1 tung1 fuk6 mou6 jau5 haan6 gung1 si1
- Website: dbcommunity.hkri.workers.dev

Discovery Bay Transportation Services Ltd (Traditional Chinese: 愉景灣航運服務有限公司), or just Discovery Bay Transportation Services (DBTS), is a transport company which provides ferry and bus services to Discovery Bay on Lantau Island. It is subsidiary of the HKR International group.

== Bus services ==
DBTS provides both internal and external bus services.

Internal and External Bus Services
| Route no. | Start dest. | End dest. | Fare |
|---|---|---|---|
| GC | DB Plaza Bus Terminus | Discovery Bay Golf Club | Free for Golf Club members |
| 1 | DB Plaza Bus Terminus | Headland Drive / Parkland Drive | $6.2 ($5.1 for Residents) |
| 1/6 | DB Plaza Bus Terminus | Headland Drive / Parkland Drive / Seabee Lane | $6.2 ($5.1 for Residents) |
| 2 and 3 | DB Plaza Bus Terminus | Midvale/Parkvale | $6.2 ($5.1 for Residents) |
| 4 | Coastline Villa | DB North | $6.2 ($5.1 for Residents) |
| 4A | DB North | Coastline | $6.2 ($5.1 for Residents) |
| 5 | DB Plaza Bus Terminus | La Serene | $6.2 ($5.1 for Residents) |
| 6 | DB Plaza Bus Terminus | Seabee Lane | $6.2 ($5.1 for Residents) |
| 9 | Caperidge Drive | Chianti (Pavilion) | $6.2 ($5.1 for Residents) |
| 9A | Chianti (Pavilion) | Caperidge Drive | $6.2 ($5.1 for Residents) |
| 18 | DB Plaza Bus Terminus | IL PICCO House 25 | $6.2 ($5.1 for Residents) |
| DB01R | DB Plaza Bus Terminus | Tung Chung Station Bus Terminus | / Adult / Senior / Child; Non-Resident / $14.3 / $7.2 / $7.2; Resident / $11.6 / $5.8 / $5.8 |
| DB02R | DB Plaza Bus Terminus | Airport (New Coach Station) | $48 ($40.6 for Residents) |
| DB03P | DB North | Sunny Bay Public Transport Interchange | / Adult / Senior / Child; Non-Resident / $14.3 / $7.2 / $7.2; Resident / $11.6 / $5.8 / $5.8 |
| DB03R | DB Plaza Bus Terminus | Sunny Bay Public Transport Interchange | / Adult / Senior / Child; Non-Resident / $14.3 / $7.2 / $7.2; Resident / $11.6 / $5.8 / $5.8 |
| DB08R | No 28, Coastline Villa | Central Pier 3 | / Adult / Senior / Child; Non-Resident / $58 / $2 / $29; Resident / $41.7 / $2 / $20.9; Note: An overnight ferry replacement service that only runs from 00:15 to 05:00. |

Child - Aged 3 to below 12, Senior - Aged 65 or above.

Night bus services are also provided during :

- N3/2 - DB Plaza Bus Terminus <> Midvale / Parkvale
- N3/2/7/8 - DB Plaza Bus Terminus <> Midvale / Parkvale / Caperidge / Capevale / Coastline / Capeland
- N5/1/6 - DB Plaza Bus Terminus <> La Serene / Parkland / Headland / Seabee
- N7/8 - DB Plaza Bus Terminus <> Capridge / Capevale / Coastline / Capeland

== Ferry services ==
DBTS provides a high-speed ferry service between the Discovery Bay Ferry Pier and Pier 3 in Central District on Hong Kong Island. The travel time of approximately 25–30 minutes with frequency of around 20–30 minutes during most times of the day; additional services are operated during peak hours.

Ferry Fare: Discovery Bay to Central
| | Adult | Senior | Child |
|---|---|---|---|
| Non-Resident | $46 | $2 Government Scheme Applicable | $23 |
| Resident | $33.5 | $2 Government Scheme Applicable | $16.8 |

Child - Aged 1 to 12, Senior - Aged 65 or above.

DBTS has operated the following routes but ceased.

- Discovery Bay to Mui Wo
- Discovery Bay to Chek Lap Kok
- Tuen Mun to Chek Lap Kok and Tung Chung
- Central to Tsim Sha Tsui East

=== Fleet ===
Discovery Bay Transportation Services Ferry Fleet
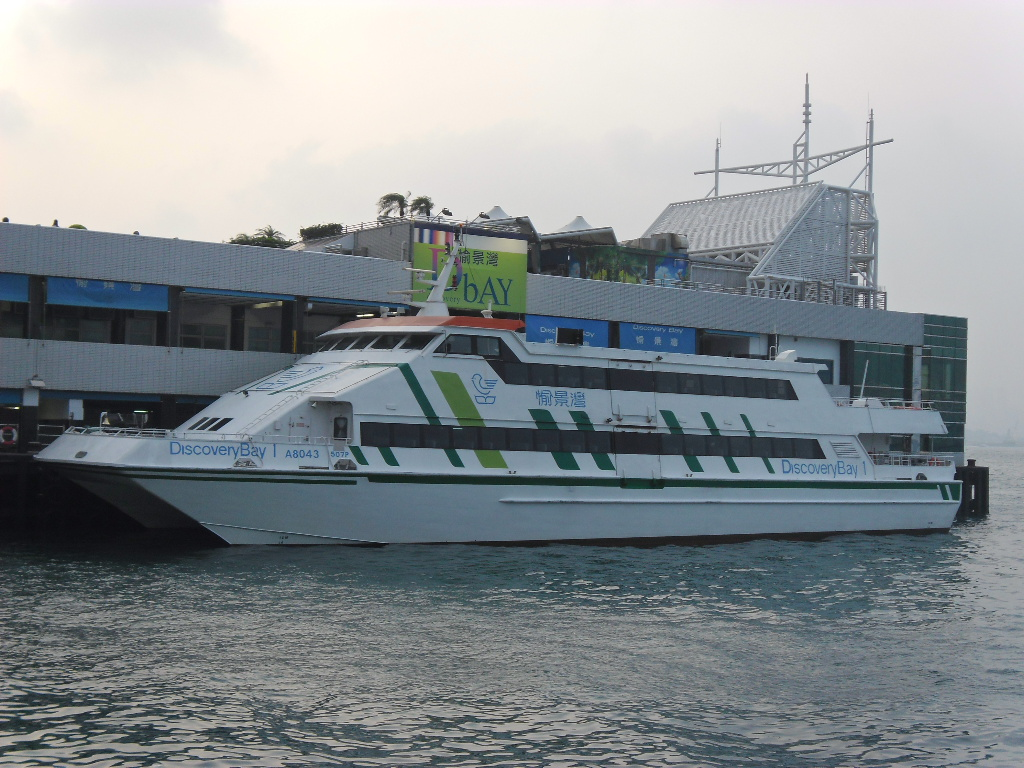
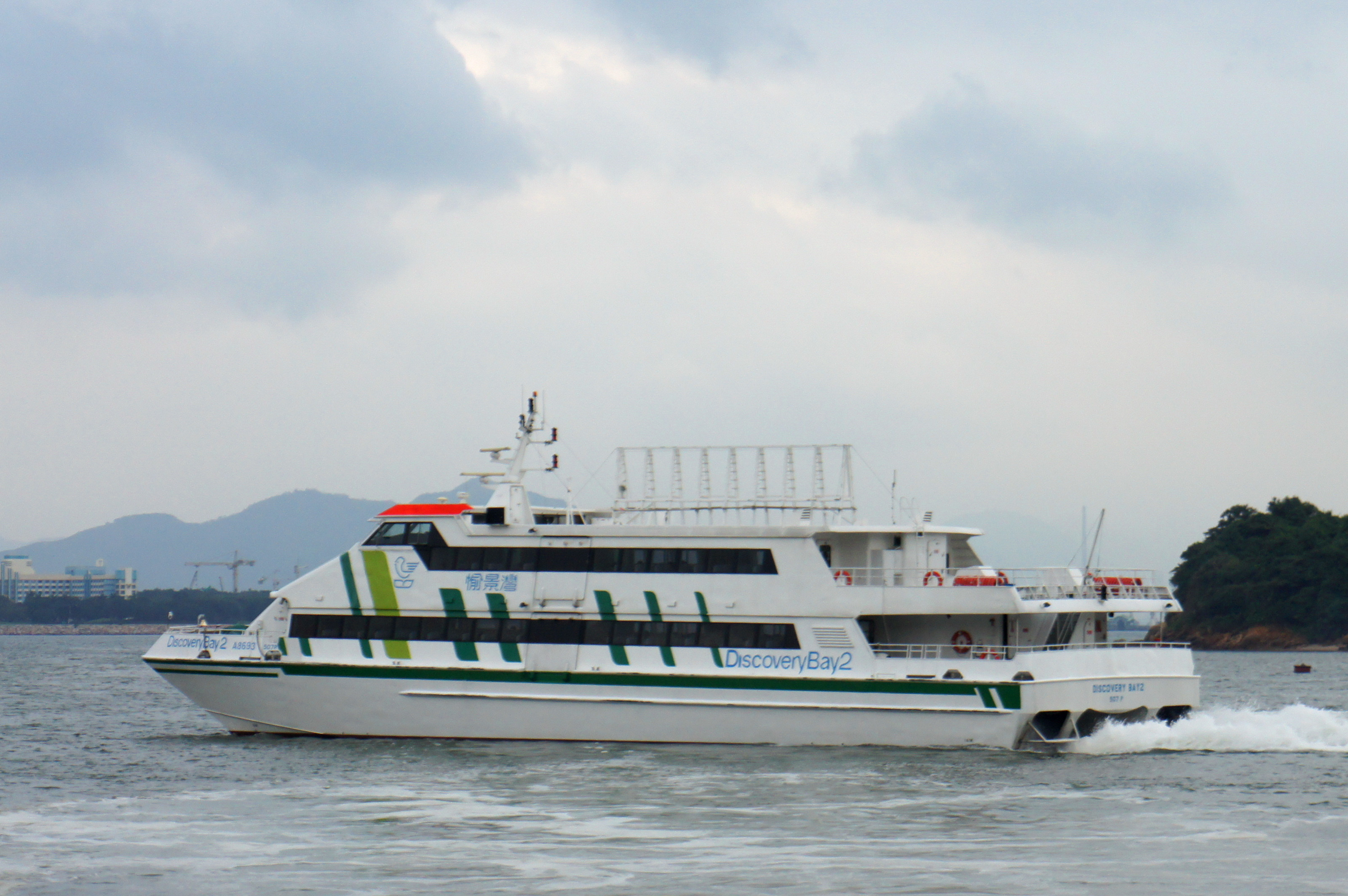
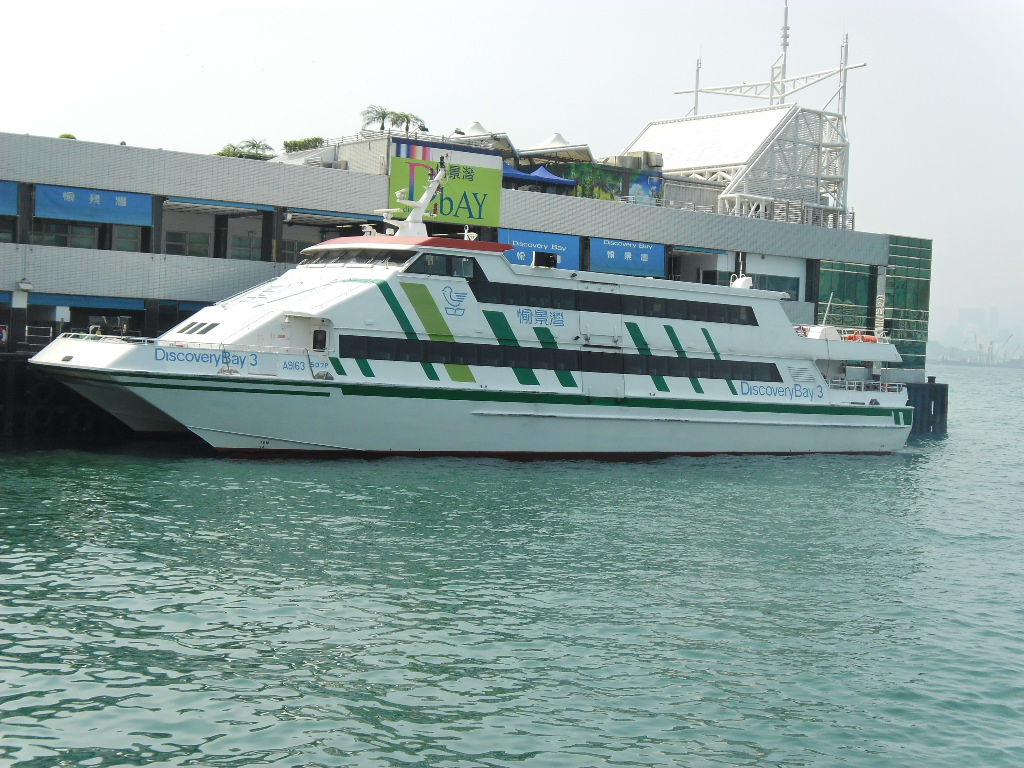
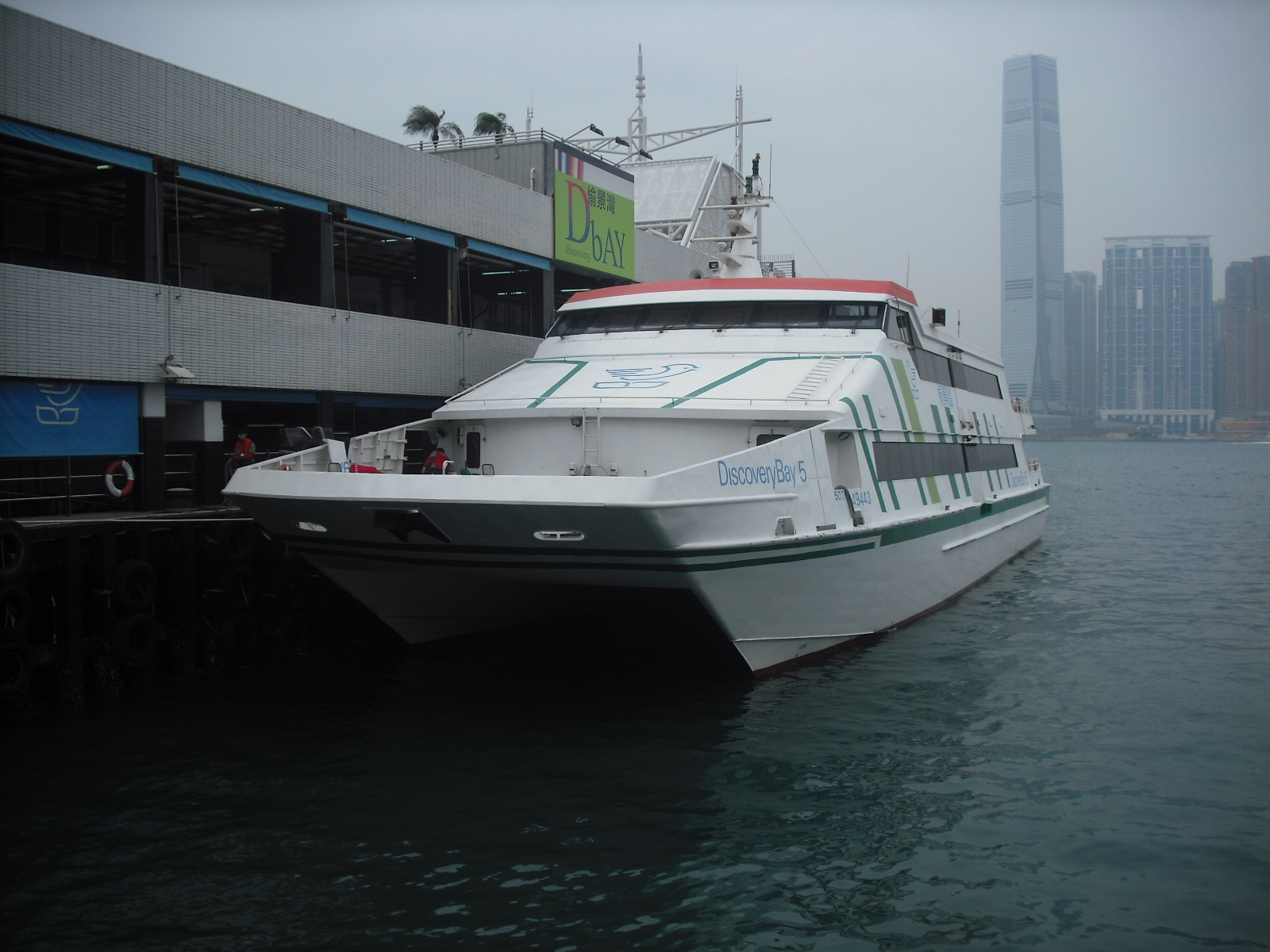
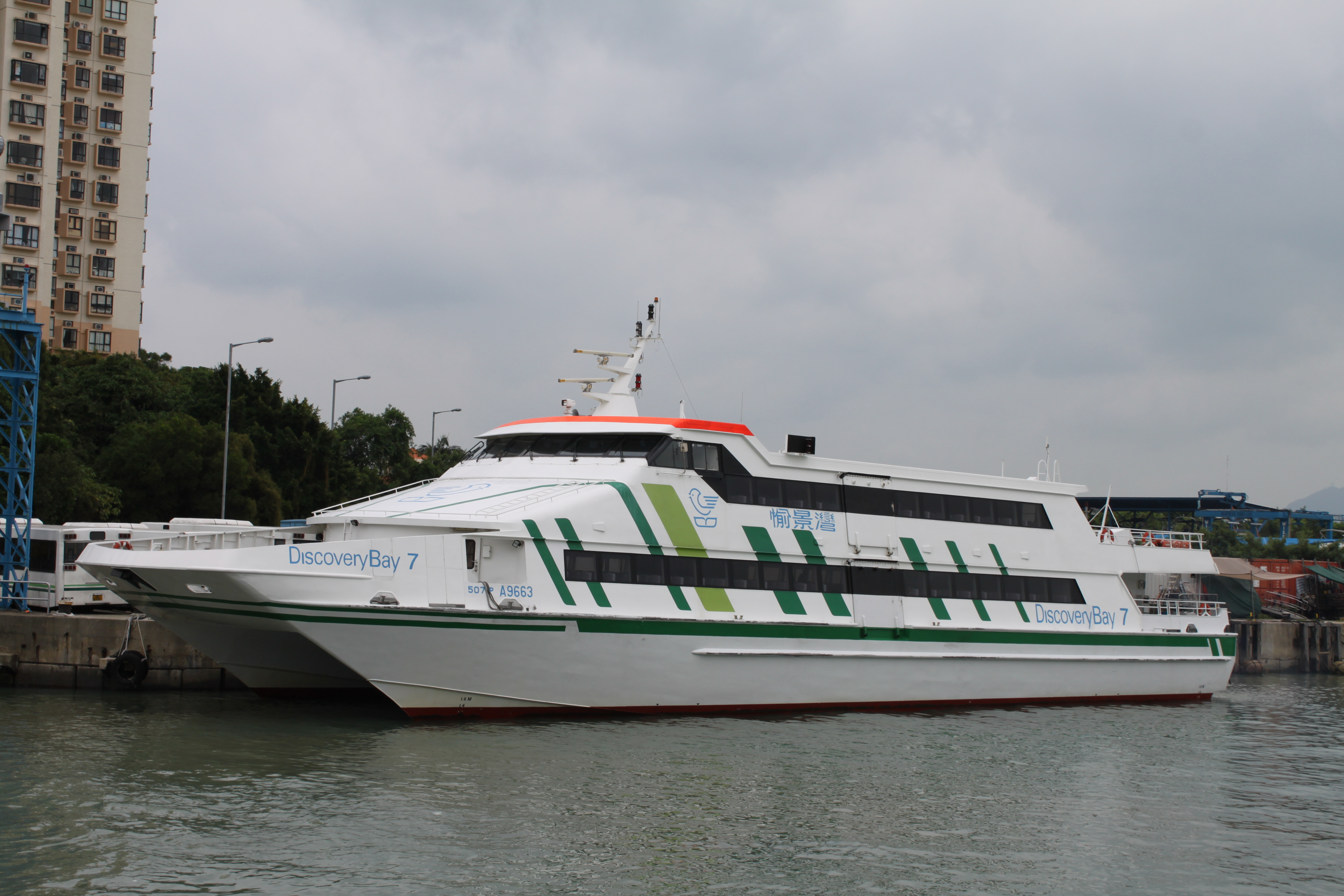
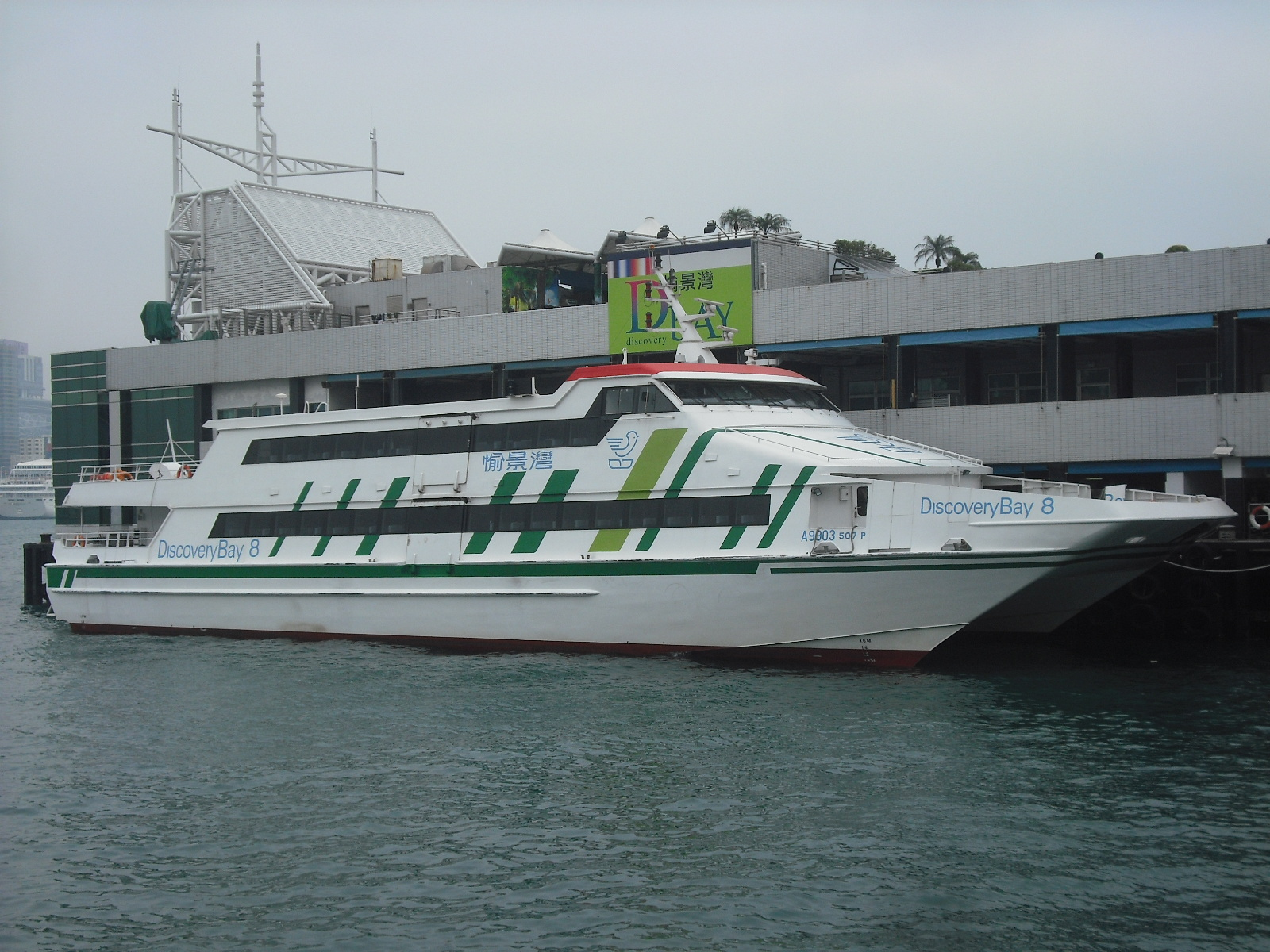
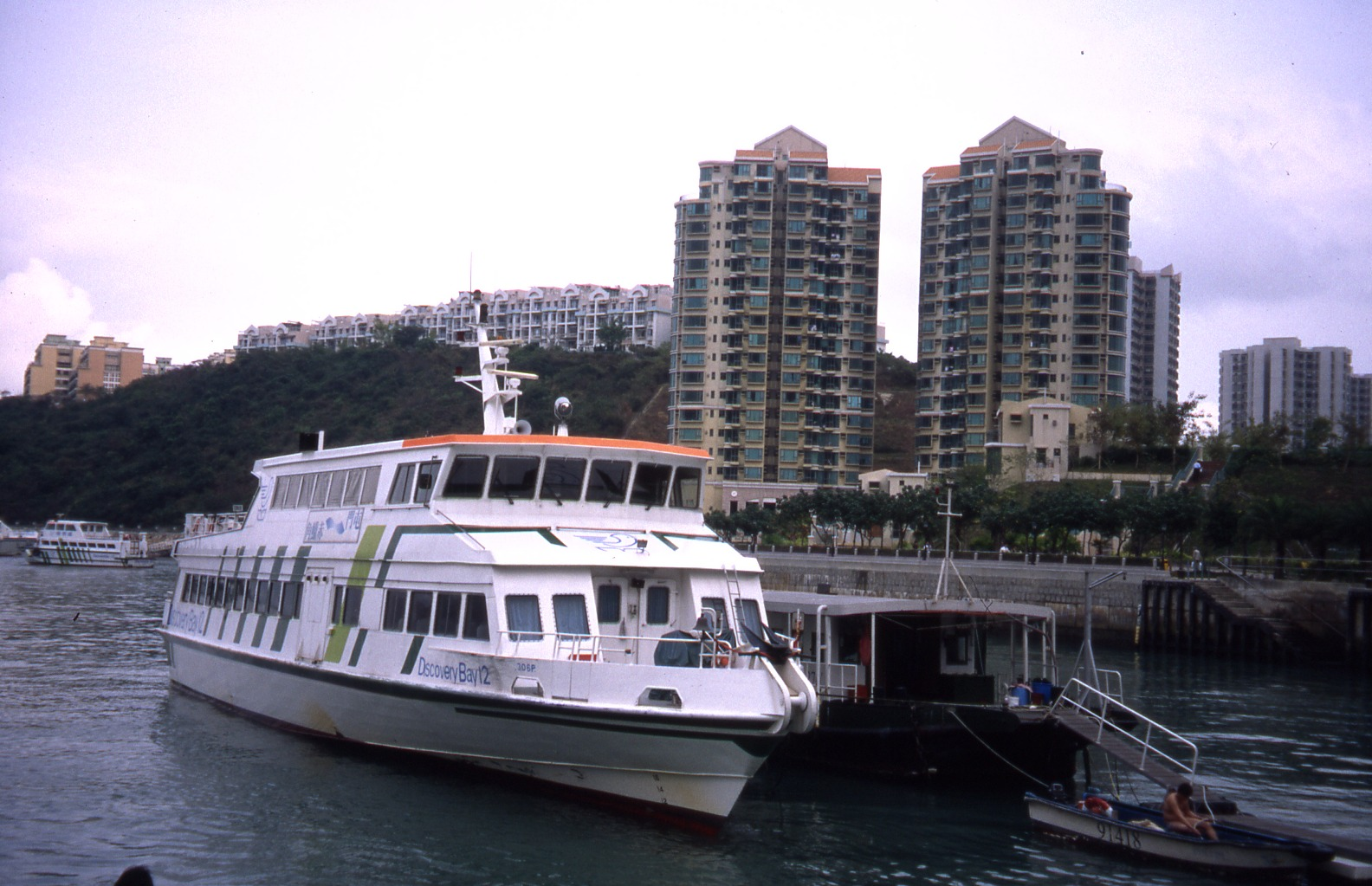
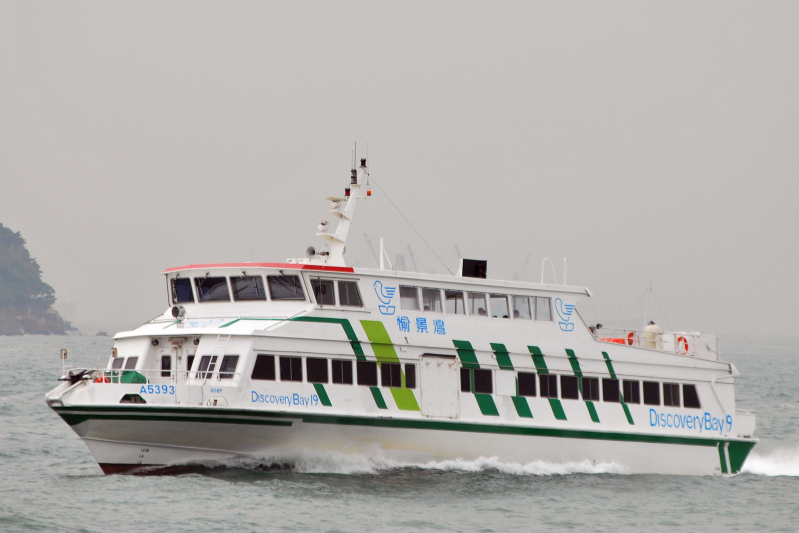
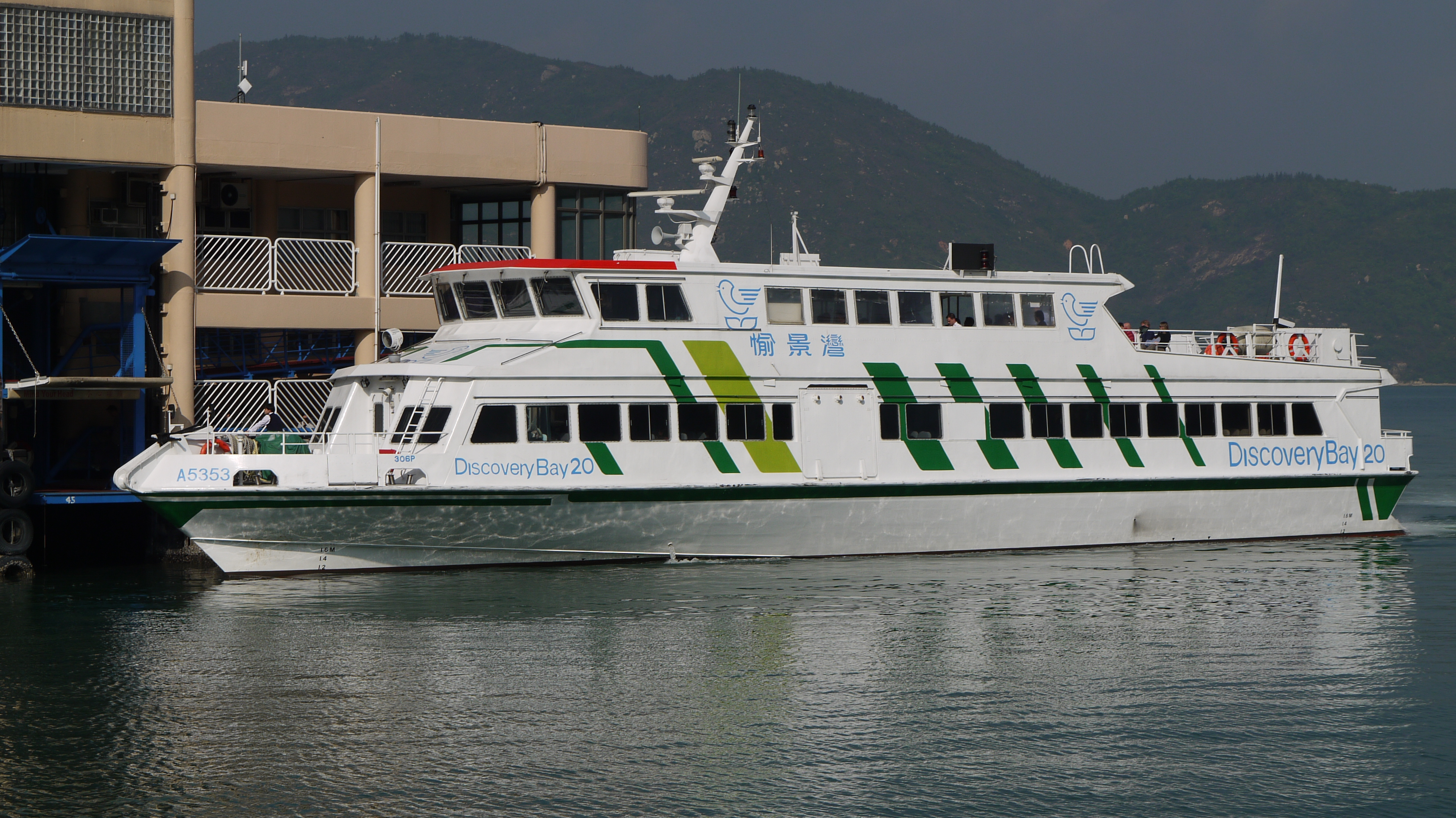
| Name | IMO | Type | Year Built | Seats | Speed | Builder | Notes | Images |
|---|---|---|---|---|---|---|---|---|
| Discovery Bay 1 | 9107148 | Catamaran | 1995 | 507 | 33 knots | Marinteknik Shipbuilders (S) Pte Ltd |
| Discovery Bay 2 | 9107150 | Catamaran | 1995 | 507 | 33 knots | Marinteknik Shipbuilders (S) Pte Ltd |
| Discovery Bay 3 | 9107162 | Catamaran | 1995 | 507 | 33 knots | Marinteknik Shipbuilders (S) Pte Ltd |
| Discovery Bay 5 | 9160451 | Catamaran | 1997 | 507 | 33 knots | Marinteknik Shipbuilders (S) Pte Ltd |
| Discovery Bay 7 | 9199816 | Catamaran | 1998 | 507 | 33 knots | Marinteknik Shipbuilders (S) Pte Ltd |
| Discovery Bay 8 | 9194622 | Catamaran | 1999 | 507 | 33 knots | Marinteknik Shipbuilders (S) Pte Ltd | Second ship to bear this name |
| Discovery Bay 10 | | | 2009 | 50 |
| Discovery Bay 12 | 8614455 | Mono-hull | 1986 | | | Marinteknik | Run aground in Yi Pak Bay in 1993; now operates as Città di Forio in Italy |
| Discovery Bay 19 | 8916956 | Mono-hull | 1989 | 306 | 25 knots | Marinteknik Shipbuilders (S) Pte Ltd |
| Discovery Bay 20 | 8916968 | Mono-hull | 1990 | 306 | 25 knots | Marinteknik Shipbuilders (S) Pte Ltd |
| Discovery Bay 21 | 9048847 | Mono-hull | 1992 | 306 | 25 knots | Marinteknik Shipbuilders (S) Pte Ltd | Temporary stopped service |
| Discovery Bay 22 | 9048859 | Mono-hull | 1993 | 306 | 25 knots | Marinteknik Shipbuilders (S) Pte Ltd | Temporary stopped service |
| DB Support | | Support vessel | 1995 | 67 | 26 knots | Marinteknik Shipbuilders (S) Pte Ltd | Temporary stopped service |

== See also ==
- Star Ferry
- Hong Kong and Yaumati Ferry
- Hong Kong & Kowloon Ferry
