= Cheung Chau Ferry Pier =

Pier in New Territories, Hong Kong

Coordinates: 22.2086°N 114.0284°E

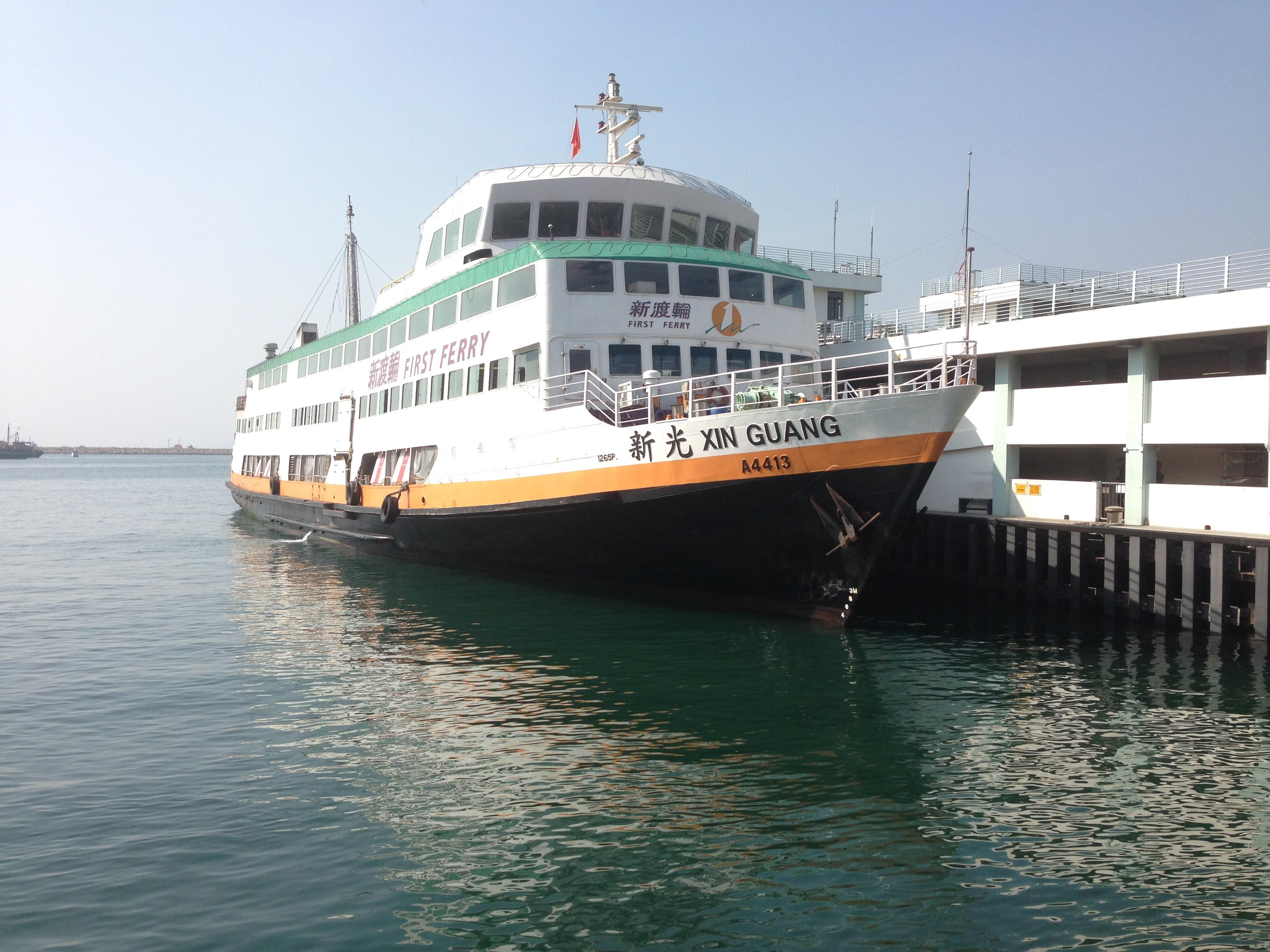
- Ferry berthed at Cheung Chau Ferry Pier
- Type: Passenger ferry pier
- Location: Cheung Chau, Hong Kong
- Owner: Hong Kong Government

Characteristics
- ID number: IP063

History
- Designer: Public Works Department
- Inaugurated: 28 April 1960; 66 years ago

Cheung Chau Ferry Pier (Chinese: 長洲渡輪碼頭; Jyutping: coeng4 zau1 dou6 leon4 maa5 tau4) serves the island of Cheung Chau, New Territories, Hong Kong. It is located on Praya Street within the Cheung Chau Typhoon Shelter.

== History ==
The pier, designed by the Port Works Division of the former Public Works Department, was officially opened on 28 April 1960. It was substantially expanded in 1986 and 1987. Renovation and improvement works in 2015 saw the passenger waiting area expanded, ventilation improved, and a new canopy constructed at the pier entrance.

== Services ==
Sun Ferry operates a regularly scheduled route to Central Pier No. 5 in Central. The service runs "ordinary" (slower) ferries, as well as faster catamaran vessels. The average daily patronage of this route was 26,315 in 2015.

== Future development ==
In 2019, the Civil Engineering and Development Department (CEDD) commissioned a private consultant to study the feasibility of reconstructing the pier. The department outlined various objectives for this project including increasing the pier's passenger handling capacity and addressing the ageing of the pier structure. The preliminary proposal is to build a new pier to the north of the current one.

== See also ==
- Cheung Chau Public Pier – a separate pier to the south
