= Yung Shue Wan Ferry Pier =

Ferry pier in Lamma Island, Hong Kong

Yung Shue Wan Ferry Pier 榕樹灣渡輪碼頭
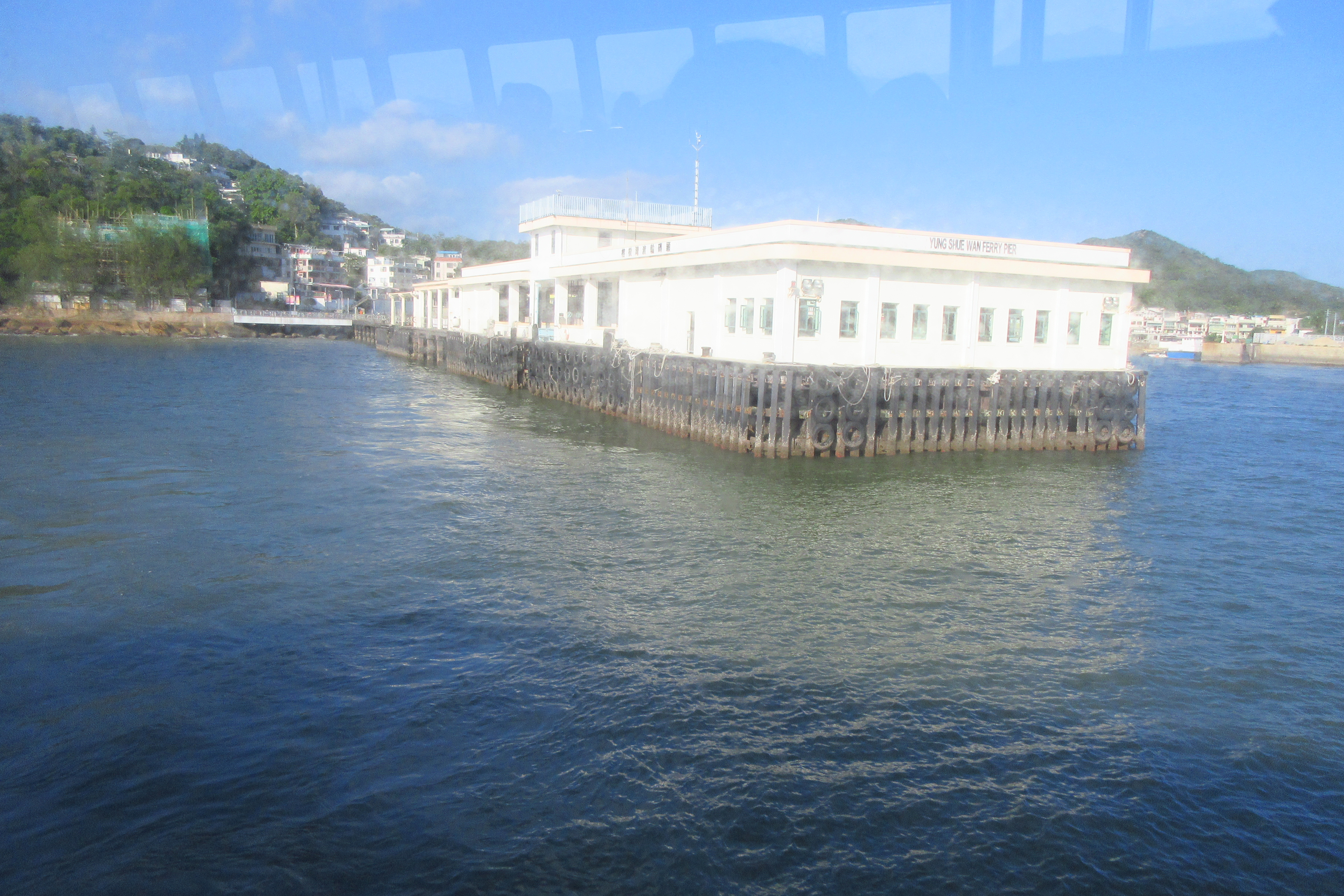
- Yung Shue Wan Ferry Pier
- Location: Yung Shue Wan Main Street, Lamma Island
- Coordinates: 22.226338°N 114.108788°E
- Operator: Transport Department
- Maintained by: Civil Engineering and Development Department

Characteristics
- ID number: IP064

History
- Opening date: 4 September 1987; 38 years ago

Yung Shue Wan Ferry Pier
- Traditional Chinese: 榕樹灣渡輪碼頭
- Simplified Chinese: 榕树湾渡轮码头
Transcriptions
Standard Mandarin
- Hanyu Pinyin: Róng Shù Wān Dù Lún Mǎ Tóu
Yue: Cantonese
- Yale Romanization: Yùhng syuh wāan douh lèuhn máh tàuh
- Jyutping: Jung4 syu6 waan1 dou6 leon4 maa5 tau4

Yung Shue Wan Ferry Pier is a ferry pier located on the waterfront of Yung Shue Wan in Yung Shue Wan Main Street, Lamma Island, Hong Kong. There are two ferry routes provided in the pier. One is the service between Yung Shue Wan and Central, operated by Hong Kong & Kowloon Ferry. Another one is the service between Yung Shue Wan and Aberdeen via Pak Kok Tsuen, operated by Tsui Wah Ferry.

== History ==
The Yung Shue Wan Public Pier was opened in 1964, but the facilities are very rudimentary, the piers are narrow and lack of lighting and complete equipment, which is not enough to cope with the large number of tourists. In view of this, the government planned in 1982 to build a ferry pier on the 0.44 hectare seabed next to the public pier, with two berthing locations and other supporting facilities.

In 1983, the government planned to spend HK$66.5 million to improve various constructions on Lamma Island, one of which was to expand the Yung Shue Wan Pier and set aside HK$10 million in the following year for the projects to improve Outlying Islands and New Territories ferry piers by the Public Works Department. However, the number of passengers on the route from Central to Yung Shue Wan was only 2,400 at that time. In addition, Hongkong and Yaumati Ferry would not dispatch three-tier ships to sail in the short term, and the improvement works of the pier were also shelved.

In 1985, the Civil Engineering and Development Department invited tenders for the construction of the Yung Shue Wan Ferry Pier. The project included a pier building with a covered waiting room, ticket office and other facilities. At the same time, the bridge between the pier and Yung Shue Wan Main Street was also widened to 65 metres, thereby improving ferry services.

The new Yung Shue Wan Ferry Pier opened on 4 September 1987.
