= Cheung Chau Public Pier =

Pier in New Territories, Hong Kong

Cheung Chau Public Pier 長洲公眾碼頭
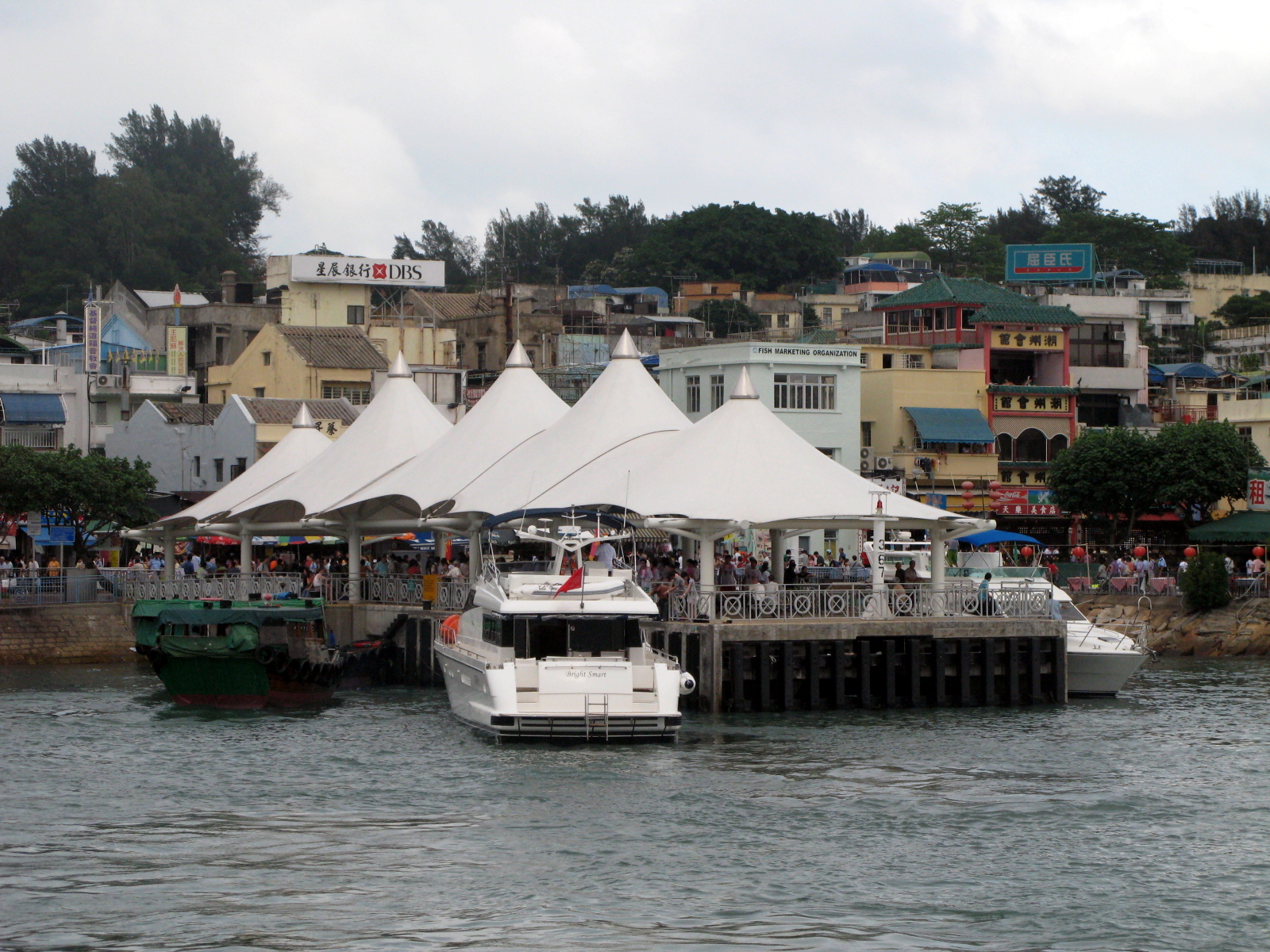
- Cheung Chau Public Pier in May 2007
- Location: Praya Street, Cheung Chau
- Coordinates: 22.2080°N 114.0284°E
- Operator: Transport Department
- Maintained by: Civil Engineering and Development Department

Characteristics
- ID number: IP026
- Construction: 2005; 21 years ago

History
- Opening date: 1950s

Cheung Chau Public Pier
- Traditional Chinese: 長洲公眾碼頭
Transcriptions
Yue: Cantonese
- Yale Romanization: Chèuhng jāu gūng jung máh tàuh
- Jyutping: Coeng^{4} zau^{1} gung^{1} zung^{3} maa^{5} tau^{4}

Cheung Chau Public Pier (Chinese: 長洲公眾碼頭) is a public pier in Cheung Chau, New Territories, Hong Kong, located in Praya Street, with Cheung Chau Ferry Pier located between it and the Cheung Chau Typhoon Shelter. It is used for loading and unloading of goods, and running kai-to operation between other islands. The pier was built in 1950s. In 2002, the government decided to reconstruct the pier due to long-time deterioration of the pier. The reconstruction work was completed in 2005. On 8 August 2015, the first ferry route operated by Maris Ferry started running between this pier and Aberdeen Promenade.
