= Outlying Islands Ferry Pier =

Port in Hong Kong

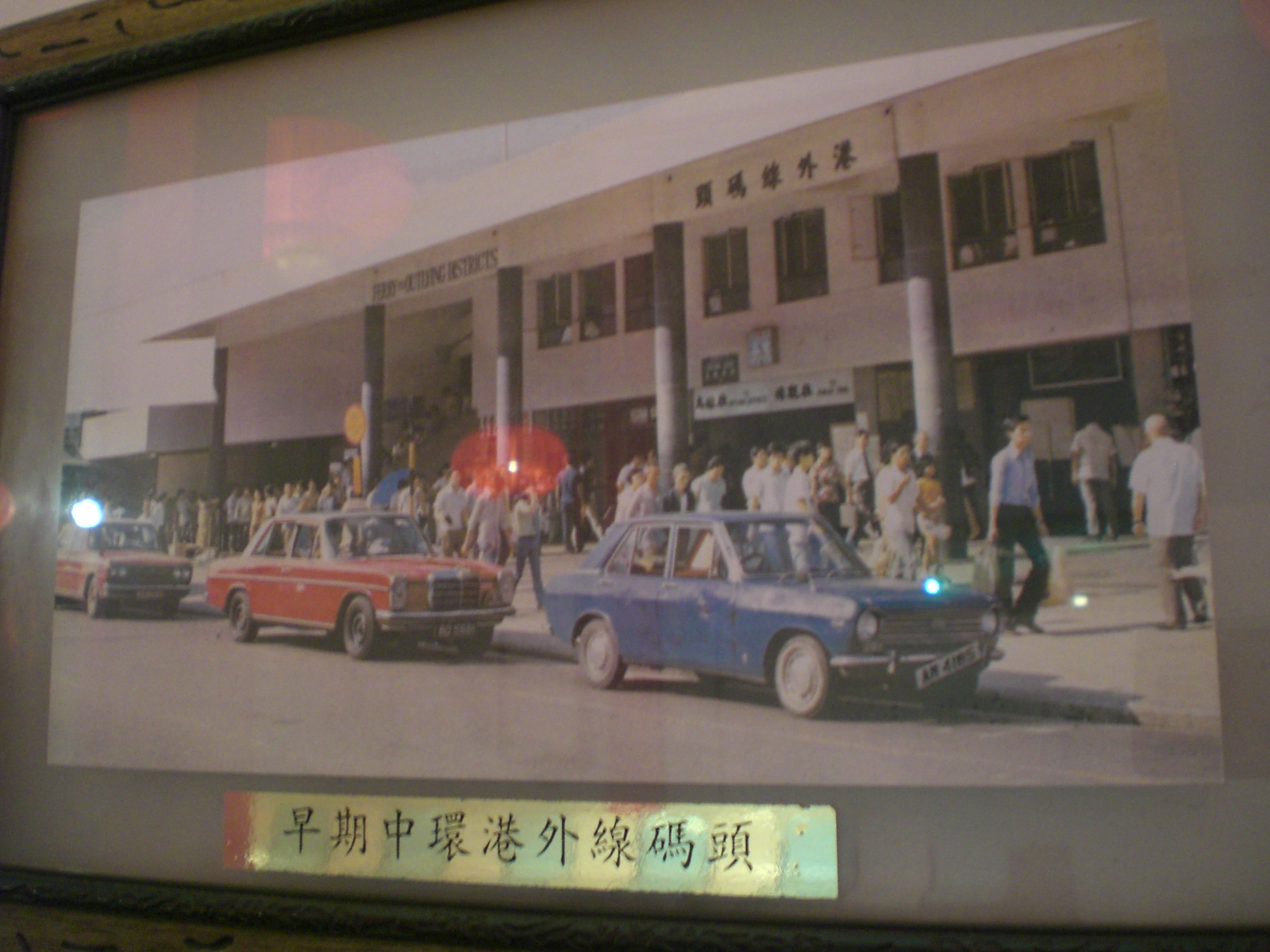
Outlying Islands Ferry Pier

Outlying Islands Ferry Pier (Chinese: 港外線碼頭) refer to the ferry piers providing ferry service outside Victoria Harbour in Central, Hong Kong. It now refers to Central Piers No.2 to No.6, near International Finance Centre. The ferry routes travel between Central and Ma Wan (Park Island), Lantau Island (Discovery Bay and Mui Wo), Lamma Island (Sok Kwu Wan and Yung Shue Wan), Cheung Chau and Peng Chau.
