= Hong Kong & Kowloon Ferry =

Hong Kong ferry operator

Hong Kong & Kowloon Ferry Ltd
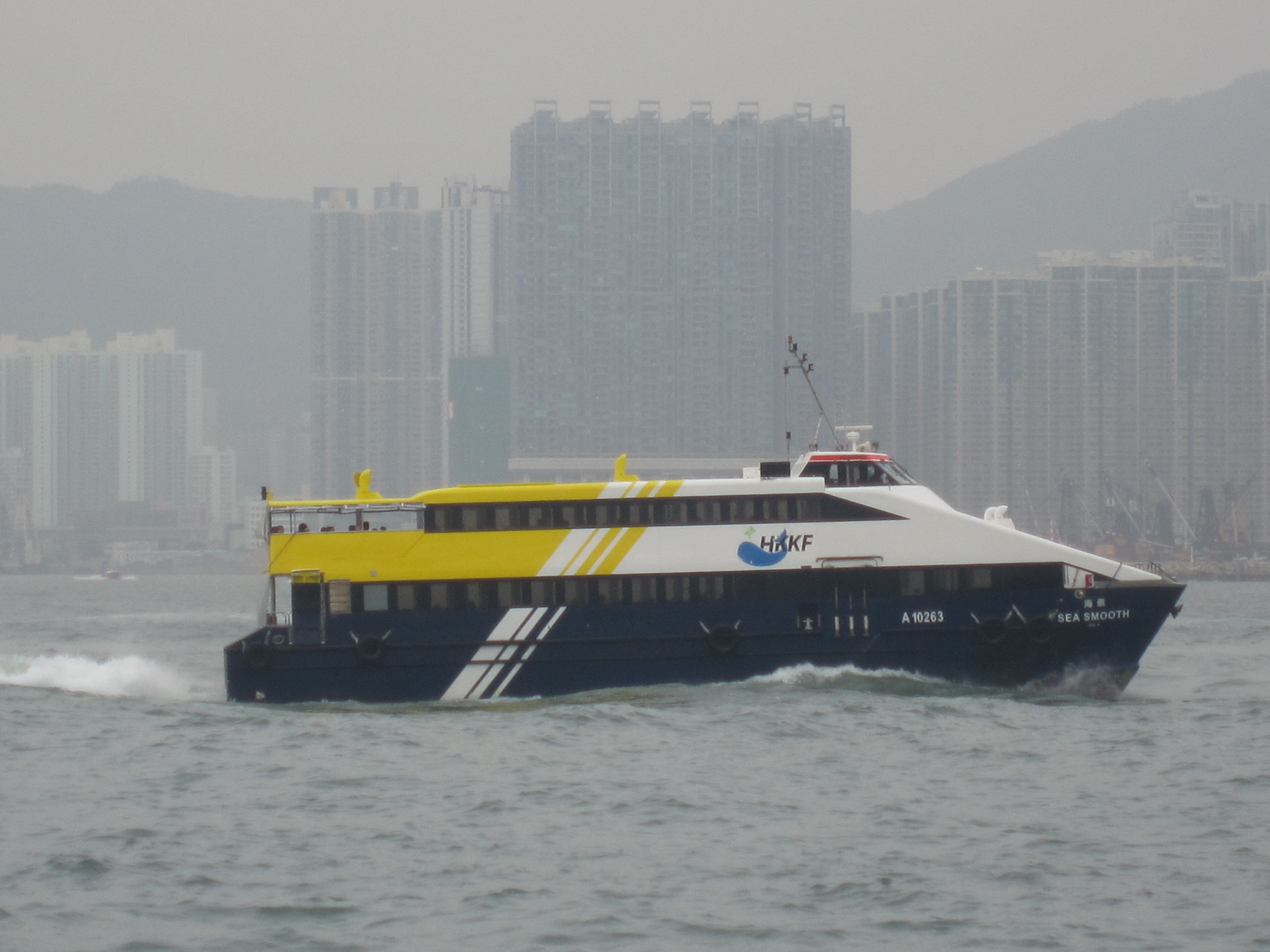
- Sea Smooth sailing at Victoria Harbour
- Company type: Private company
- Industry: Transportation
- Founded: February 1998
- Headquarters: Pier 4, New Reclamation, Central District, Hong Kong
- Parent: Hong Kong & Kowloon Ferry Holdings Ltd.
- Website: http://www.hkkf.com.hk/

Hong Kong & Kowloon Ferry
- Traditional Chinese: 港九小輪有限公司
Transcriptions
Yue: Cantonese
- Yale Romanization: Góng gáu síu lèuhn yáuh haahn gūng sī
- Jyutping: Gong2 gau2 siu2 leon4 jau5 haan6 gung1 si1

Hong Kong & Kowloon Ferry Ltd (HKKF) is a ferry service company in Hong Kong. It was formed by a number of shipping and shipbuilding firms, and was incorporated in Hong Kong in February 1998.

HKKF currently provides 3 licensed scheduled passenger ferry routes to the Outlying Islands of the city. Other than regular ferry services, HKKF offers services to parties such as government departments and the US Army.

== Fleet ==
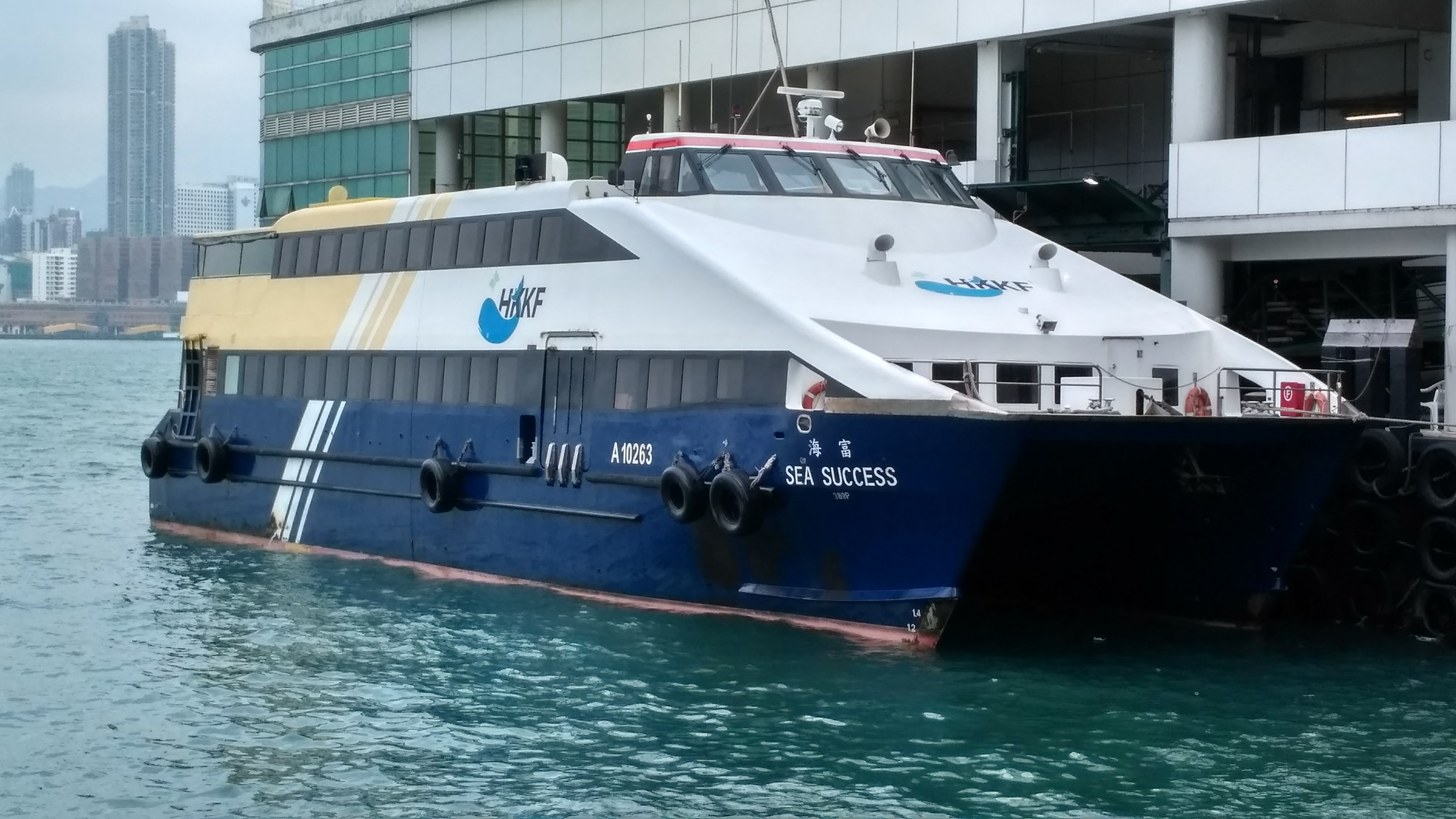
Sea Success

Hong Kong & Kowloon Ferry Limited Fleet(All are built by Cheoy Lee Shipyard)
Name	Type	Year Built	Seats	Speed (Knots)	COO Number	Notes
Sea Star	Double-decker ferry	1981	348	15	A3823	Ex-Kun Yieh
Flying Flame	Mono-hull	1988	178	25	A4993	Ex-Discovery Bay 17
Sea Splendid	Mono-hull	1988	180	25	A5023	Ex-Flying Swift / Discovery Bay 18
Kun Tuo	Double-decker ferry	1995	400	24	A8913	Owned by Cheoy Lee Shipyard
Sea Sprint	Catamaran	1997	206	24	A9683
Sea Strike	Catamaran	1999	201	24	A9773
Sea Spring	Double-decker ferry	1999	410	16	A9803
Sea Splash	Double-decker ferry	1999	410	16	A9783
Sea Supreme	Catamaran	1999	382	25	A9853
Sea Smart	Catamaran	2000	205	24	A9963	Ex-Kun Lee
Sea Success	Catamaran	2003	389	27	A10263	Ex-Sea Smooth / Park Island 6
Sea Superior	Catamaran	2003	349	25	A10283
Sea Superb	Catamaran	2010	429	28	A139155
Sea Serene	Catamaran	2010	429	28	A139359
Sea Speed	Catamaran	2012	429	28	A140255
Sea Spirit	Catamaran	2012	417	30	A140296
Sea Summit	Catamaran	2014	417	30	A141677
Sea Shine	Catamaran	2014	417	30	A141700
Sea Sparkle	Catamaran	2019	403	25	A143310

== Services ==
=== Regular passenger ferry services ===
Currently HKKF operates 3 licensed ferry routes, linking the Outlying Islands of Peng Chau and Lamma Island to Central, Hong Kong.

- Central (Pier 4) to Lamma Island (Yung Shue Wan)
- Central (Pier 4) to Lamma Island (Sok Kwu Wan)
- Central (Pier 6) to Peng Chau
- Peng Chau to Hei Ling Chau

=== Ceased ferry services ===
- Aberdeen to Lamma Island (Yung Shue Wan) (via: Pak Kok Tsuen) – currently operated by Tsui Wah Ferry
- Central to Lamma Island (Pak Kok Tsuen) (via: Kennedy Town)
- Tsuen Wan to Central (via: Tsing Yi)

=== Other services ===
HKKF also provides services to the following parties:

- Correctional Services Department
- Airport Core Projects Contractors and Hong Kong Airport Authority
- Emergency ferry services for Transport Department
- US Army during visits to Hong Kong

== Accidents ==
On 1 October 2012 at approximately 8:20 pm HKT, Sea Smooth of HKKF crashed into a Hongkong Electric-owned vessel Lamma IV off Lamma Island, causing the latter to sink. It was the deadliest maritime disaster in Hong Kong since 1971, with 38 killed and more than 100 injured.

== See also ==
- 2012 Lamma Island ferry collision, involving a HKKF vessel
- Sun Ferry, another Hong Kong ferry operator
