= Discovery Bay Ferry Pier =

Ferry Pier in Hong Kong

Coordinates: 22.2969°N 114.0178°E

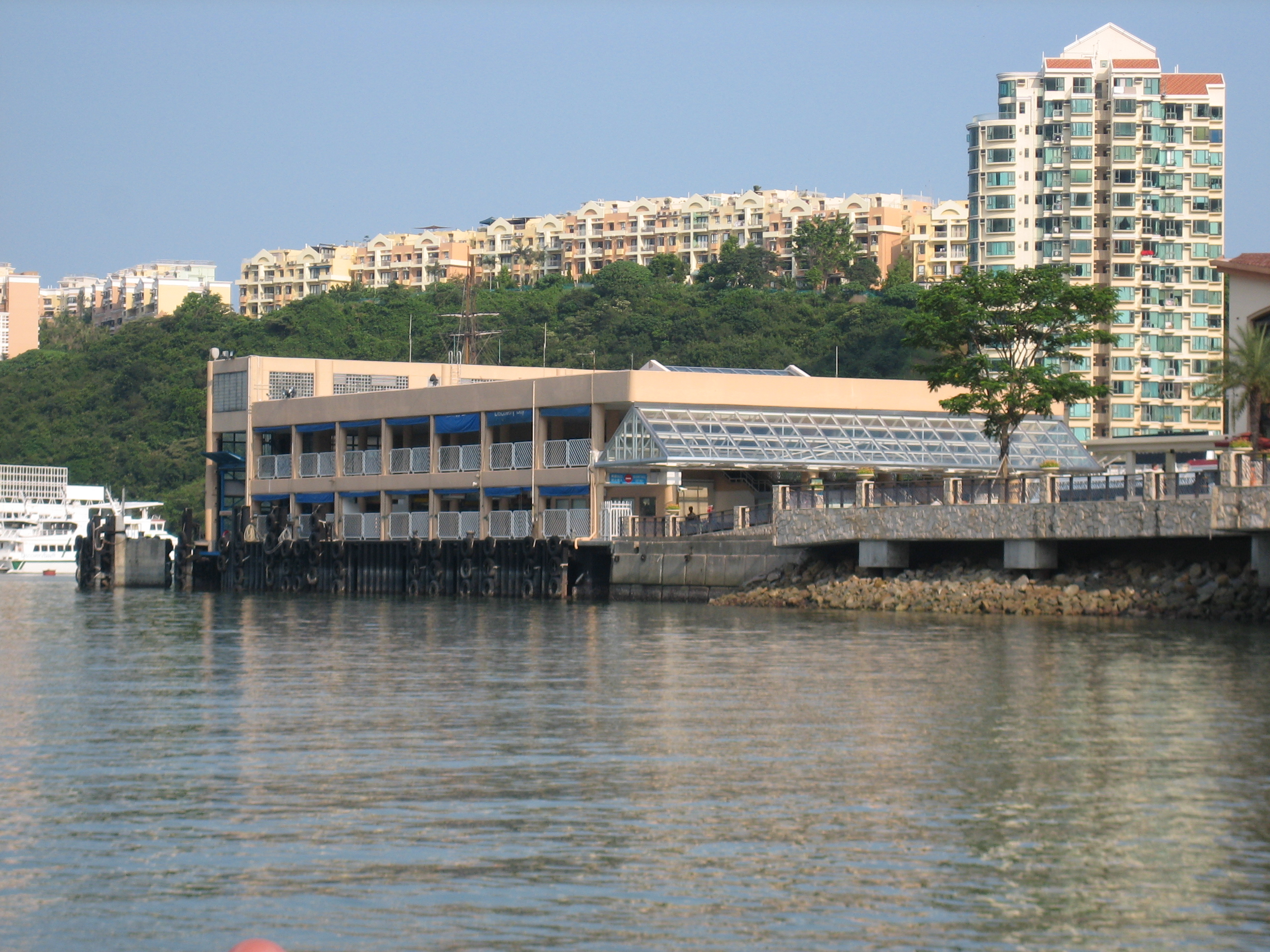
Discovery Bay Ferry Pier in September 2008

Discovery Bay Ferry Pier (Chinese: 愉景灣渡輪碼頭) is a two-storey ferry pier in Discovery Bay, Lantau Island, New Territories, Hong Kong. It is located near La Costa and Costa Court and opposite Discovery Bay Plaza and a bus terminus.
