= List of Hong Kong people of Sze Yap descent =

Over 120 Hong Kong celebrities of Siyi ancestry are enshrined in the Jiangmen Star Park.

- Kenny Bee (Xinhui)
- Anthony Chan (actor) （Xinhui）
- Connie Chan
- Kenneth Chan Kai-tai (Jiangmen)
- Peter Chan (businessman)
- Sita Chan（1987 in Hong Kong – 2013 Hong Kong, Xinhui)
- Cheung Po Tsai (1783, Xinhui –1822, Xinhui
- Bondy Chiu
- Norman Chui
- Gillian Chung
- Ha Yu (actor)
- Kam Nai-wai
- Gigi Lai
- Lai Man-Wai
- Domingos Lam
- Andy Lau, actor (Xinhui)
- Hacken Lee
- Lee Hysan
- Jung Kong Lee
- Philip S. Lee
- Tina Leung
- Wu Tingfang
- Deep Ng
- Darryl O'Young
- Vivienne Poy
- William So
- Alan Tam
- Ti Lung
- Nancy Wu
- Michelle Yim
- Yip Hon
- Howard Young
- Joey Yung
- Lui Che-woo (Heshan)
- Lee Kum Sheung, founder of Lee Kum Kee
- Tony Leung Chiu-wai
- Donnie Yen
- Hu Die (Heshan)
- Li Shek-pang family
