= Sunning Plaza =

Building in Causeway Bay, Hong Kong

- 新寧大廈
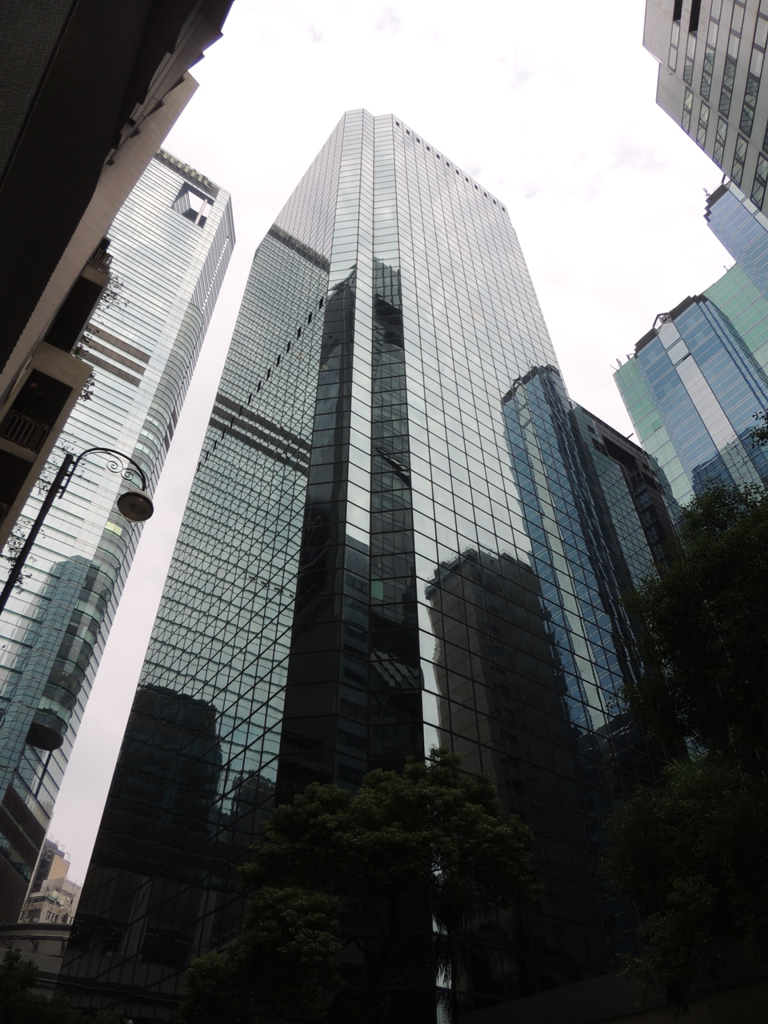
- Sunning Plaza in 2013 before demolition.
- Interactive map of the Sunning Plaza area

General information
- Type: Office building
- Location: Causeway Bay, Hong Kong
- Coordinates: 22°16′41″N 114°11′7″E
- Opened: 1982
- Renovated: 2003
- Demolished: 2013

Technical details
- Floor count: 30

Design and construction
- Architect: I. M. Pei

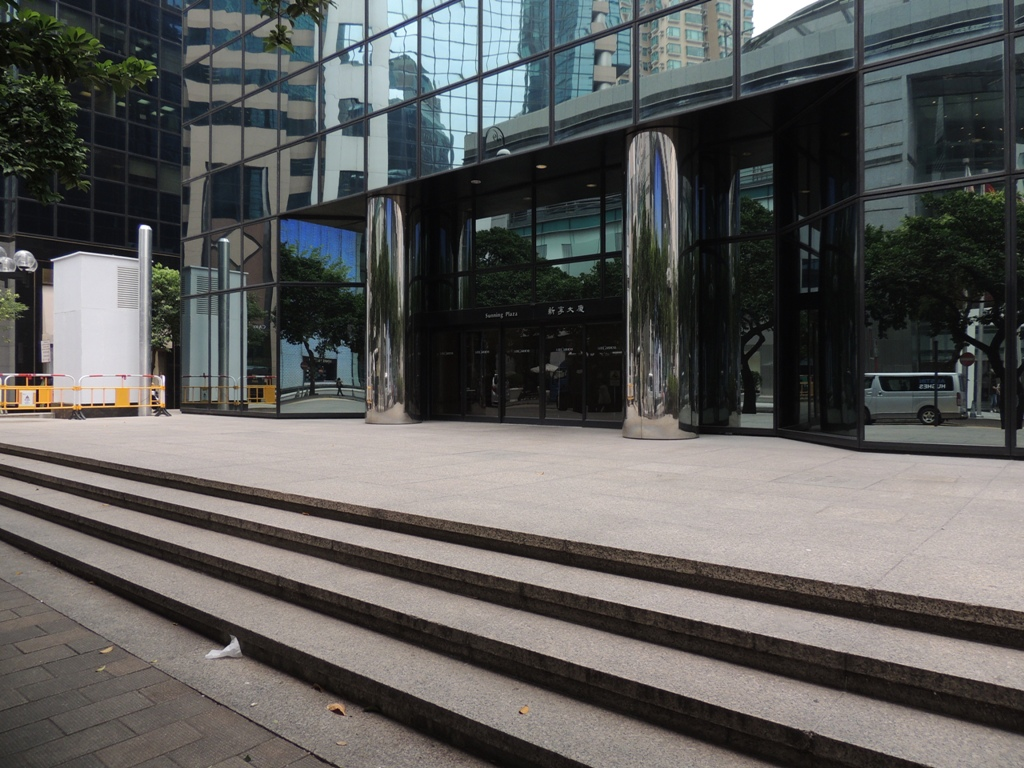
Entrance of Sunning Plaza

Sunning Plaza (Chinese: 新寧大廈) was a 30-storey office building in Causeway Bay, Hong Kong. This and the adjacent 19-storey residential building Sunning Court (新寧閣) were the first of only two projects in Hong Kong of Chinese-American architect I. M. Pei, the other one being the Bank of China Tower. They were located in the area bounded by Hysan Avenue, Sunning Road and Hoi Ping Road. The two buildings were completed in 1982, and Sunning Court was renovated in 2003.

There was a large open space around the buildings, creating an "urban oasis" for the dense Causeway Bay area. A scene of John Woo's 1986 movie A Better Tomorrow was filmed at the space before the entrance of Sunning Plaza.

Although the buildings were relatively young, the landlord Hysan Development announced its plan to redevelop the two buildings into a bigger retail and office complex in 2013, and the demolition started late the same year. Lee Garden Three was opened on the site in 2018.

The company has a history of tearing down young building. Hennessy Centre, completed in 1981 and owned by the same company, was torn down in 2006 for development of Hysan Place.

I. M. Pei once told Hong Kong architect Raymond Fung Wing-kee in 1992 that Hong Kong developers like to commission him to design, but do not quite like his design.
