= Lee Theatre =

Theatre in Hong Kong, China

Coordinates: 22°16′42″N 114°10′59″E

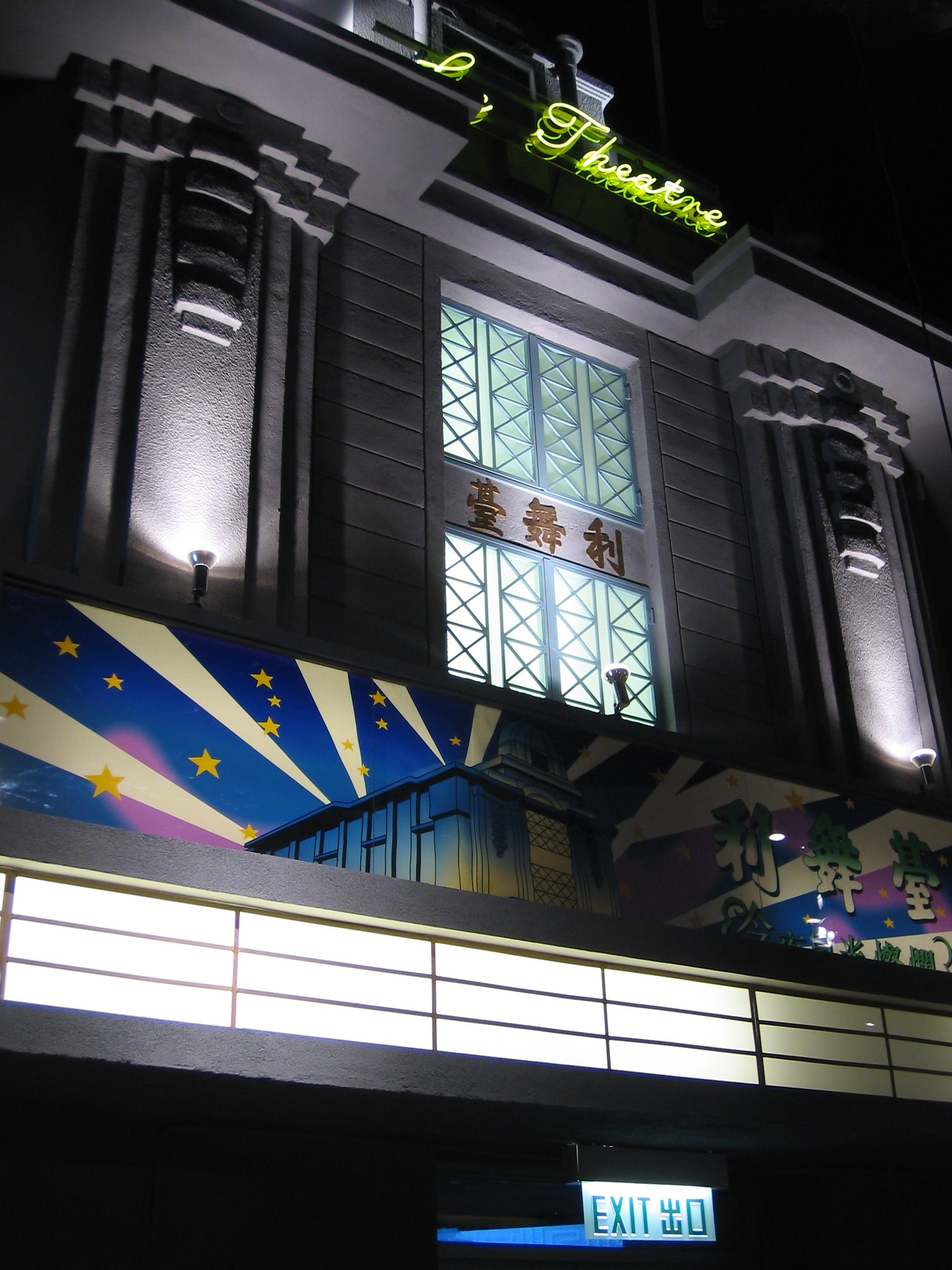
Lee Theatre reconstructed in Hong Kong History Museum.

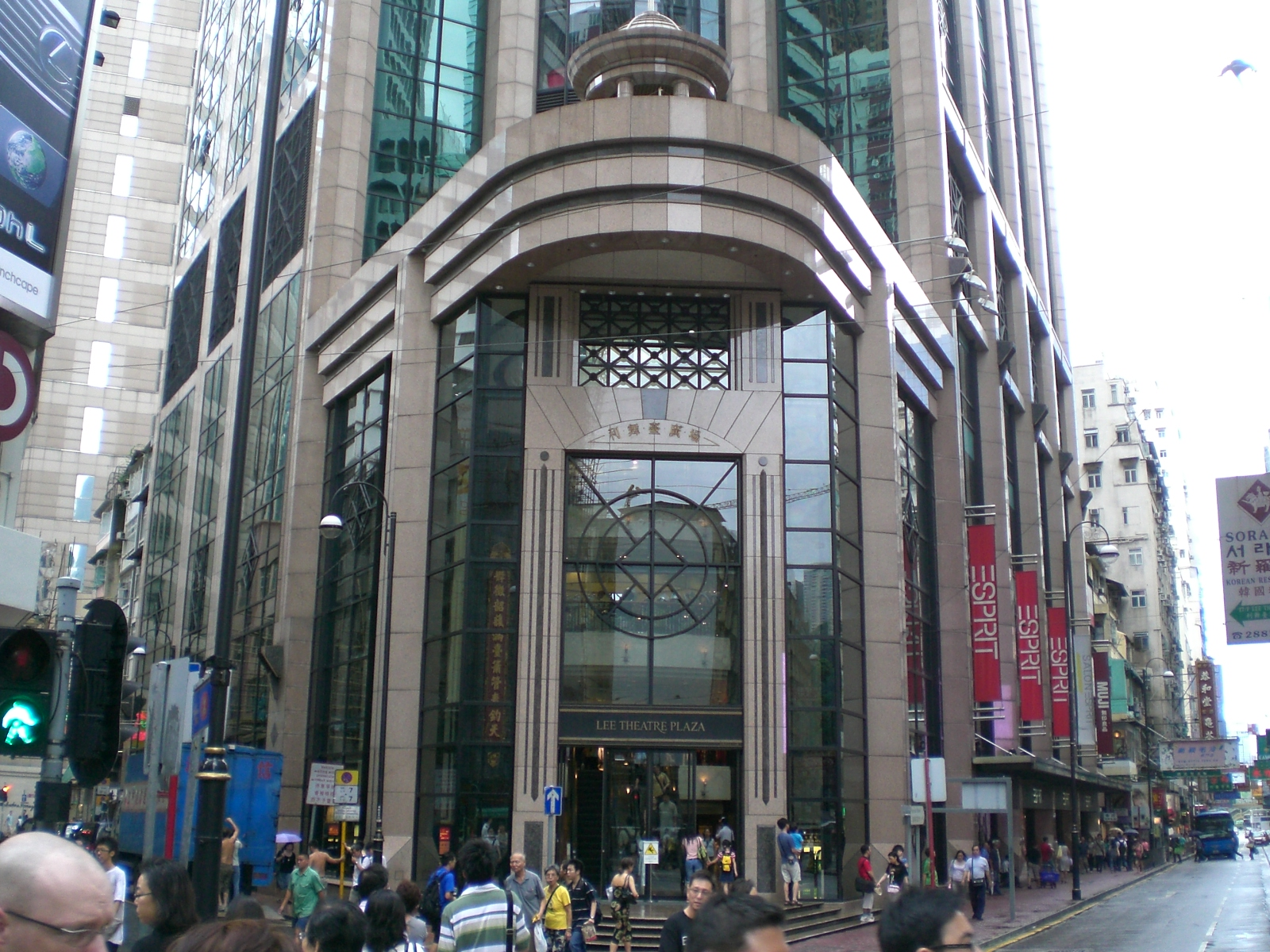
Lee Theatre Plaza, built on the site of the Lee Theatre

Lee Theatre (Chinese: 利舞臺; Jyutping: lei6 mou5 toi4; pinyin: Lì wǔtái) was a prominent theatre in Causeway Bay on Hong Kong Island, Hong Kong. Once one of the premier performing venues in Hong Kong, the Beaux-Arts theatre was demolished in the 1990s and replaced with an office building and a shopping centre.

== History ==
In the 1920s, the Hysan Lee family acquired lands in the Causeway Bay area. At the time, most of the venues for Cantonese opera were located in Western District. In order to save his mother, an avid Cantonese opera fan, from having to make frequent trips there, Lee decided to build a theatre in Causeway Bay. The theatre, located on Percival Street near Leighton Road, was completed in 1925 with seating for 2000 patrons. Upon its opening, Hong Kong Tramways began to run a special late night service from the theatre to Shek Tong Tsui. The Lee Theatre supposedly opened to business on 10 February 1927.

The theatre was renovated in the 1970s. From 1973 until the late 1980s, the theatre hosted the annual Miss Hong Kong Pageant, organized by TVB (in which the Lee family held a stake). The theatre also hosted the Miss Universe pageant in 1976.

Over the years, numerous artists gave performances at the theatre, including Roman Tam, Teresa Teng and Liza Wang.

Along with hosting Cantonese opera and concerts, the theatre also showed films. The last one it screened before closing down was Terminator 2: Judgment Day.

== Redevelopment ==
By the 1980s, property prices in Hong Kong skyrocketed, and the Lee family began to consider demolishing the theatre to develop the prime land it sat on. The land was sold to Hysan Development (the family's corporate arm) in March 1991, and the theatre closed four months later, on 19 August 1991. Roman Tam bade farewell to the theatre with a special concert, and RTHK's Television Division also prepared a special programme commemorating the theatre.

The site was redeveloped into the Lee Theatre Plaza, a commercial building which was completed in 1995. There was also a movie cinema within the new building, but closed and replaced as a restaurant in 2005.

A replica facade of the original Lee Theatre can be found at the Hong Kong History Museum.

== See also ==
- List of cinemas in Hong Kong
- Ko Shing Theatre
- Yau Ma Tei Theatre

Preceded by National Gymnasium (El Salvador) San Salvador	Miss Universe venue 1976	Succeeded by National Theater (Dominican Republic) Santo Domingo
