= Leighton Road =

Road in Causeway Bay, Hong Kong

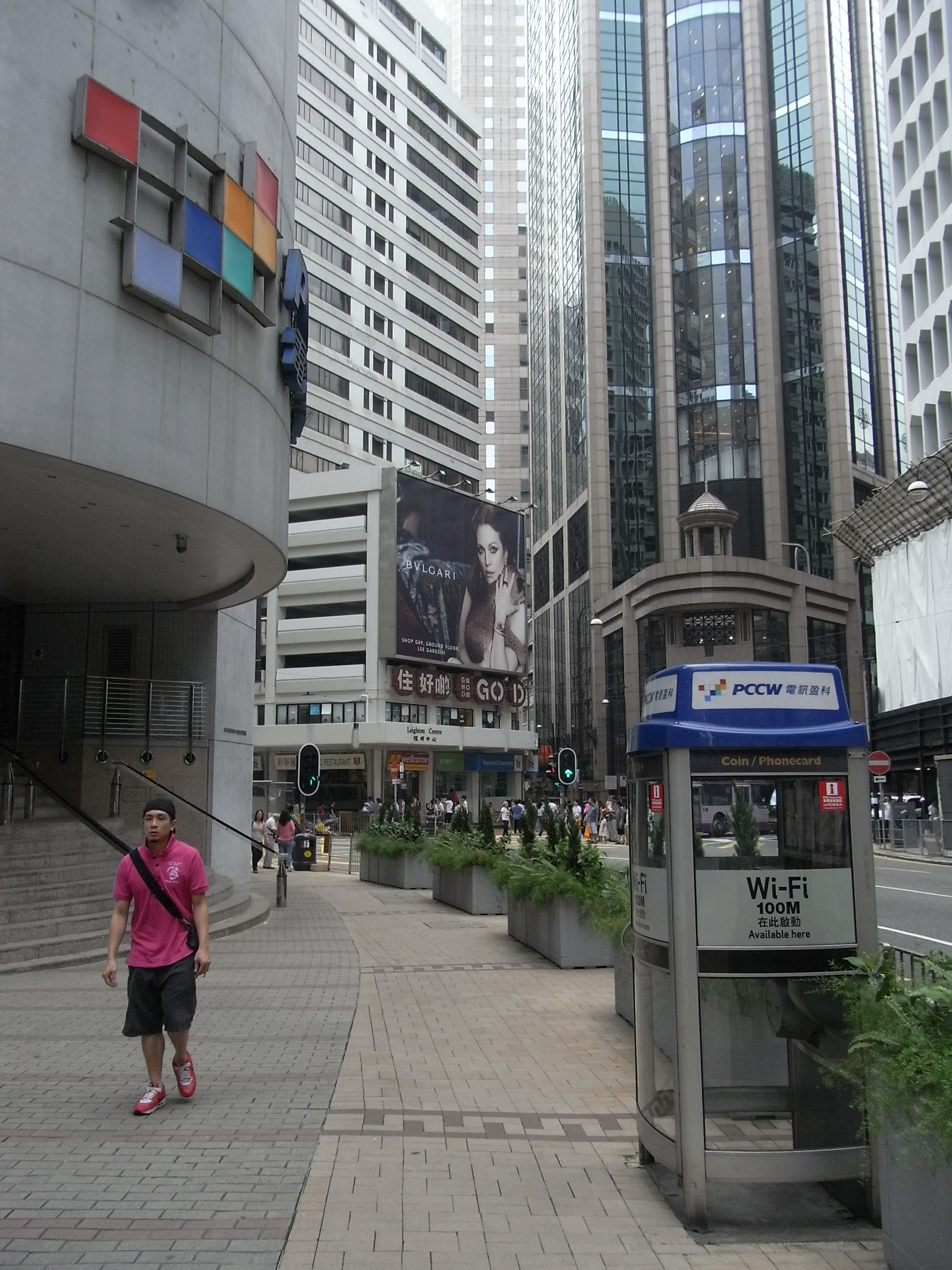
- Leighton Road (first half), PCCW Tower (left) in August 2010
- Interactive map of Leighton Road
- Native name: 禮頓道 (Yue Chinese)
- Location: Leighton Hill, Hong Kong Island, Hong Kong
- Coordinates: 22.2776°N 114.1841°E

Leighton Road
- Traditional Chinese: 禮頓道
- Simplified Chinese: 礼顿道
Transcriptions
Standard Mandarin
- Hanyu Pinyin: Lǐdùn Dào
Yue: Cantonese
- Jyutping: lai5 deon6 dou6

Leighton Road (Chinese: 禮頓道) is a main road in Causeway Bay, Hong Kong. It begins east of Causeway Road and ends at the west of the junction with Morrison Hill Road and Canal Road.

== History ==
Part of the road skirts Leighton Hill to its north while part of it runs along Lee Garden (a property of the Lee Hysan family), known as Jardine's Hill (owned by Jardine-Matheson) in early colonial days. The area adjacent to the road is relatively quiet compared to the business centre of East Point of Causeway Bay.

There was a Zoroastrian Church on Leighton Road between 1931 and 1991, which was later demolished and rebuilt as the Zoroastrian Building (善樂施大廈) in 1993, with the church on the fifth floor.

== Features ==
A branch road, Wong Nai Chung Road leads to the Happy Valley Racecourse and the upscale residential area of Happy Valley.

- No. 8. Crowne Plaza Hong Kong Causeway Bay Hotel, an InterContinental Hotels Group-franchised hotel, has been located there since 2009.
- No. 66. Po Leung Kuk headquarters
- No. 77. Leighton Centre (禮頓中心), owned by Hysan Development Company, is a grade A office building.
- No. 101. Zoroastrian Building (善樂施大廈). A first building was erected in the 1930s. The current building was built in 1993.
- No. 111. Lee Garden Six
- No. 133. Lanson Place Hotel (逸蘭精品酒店)
- No. 140. St. Paul's Convent School
- Craigengower Cricket Club

== Gallery ==
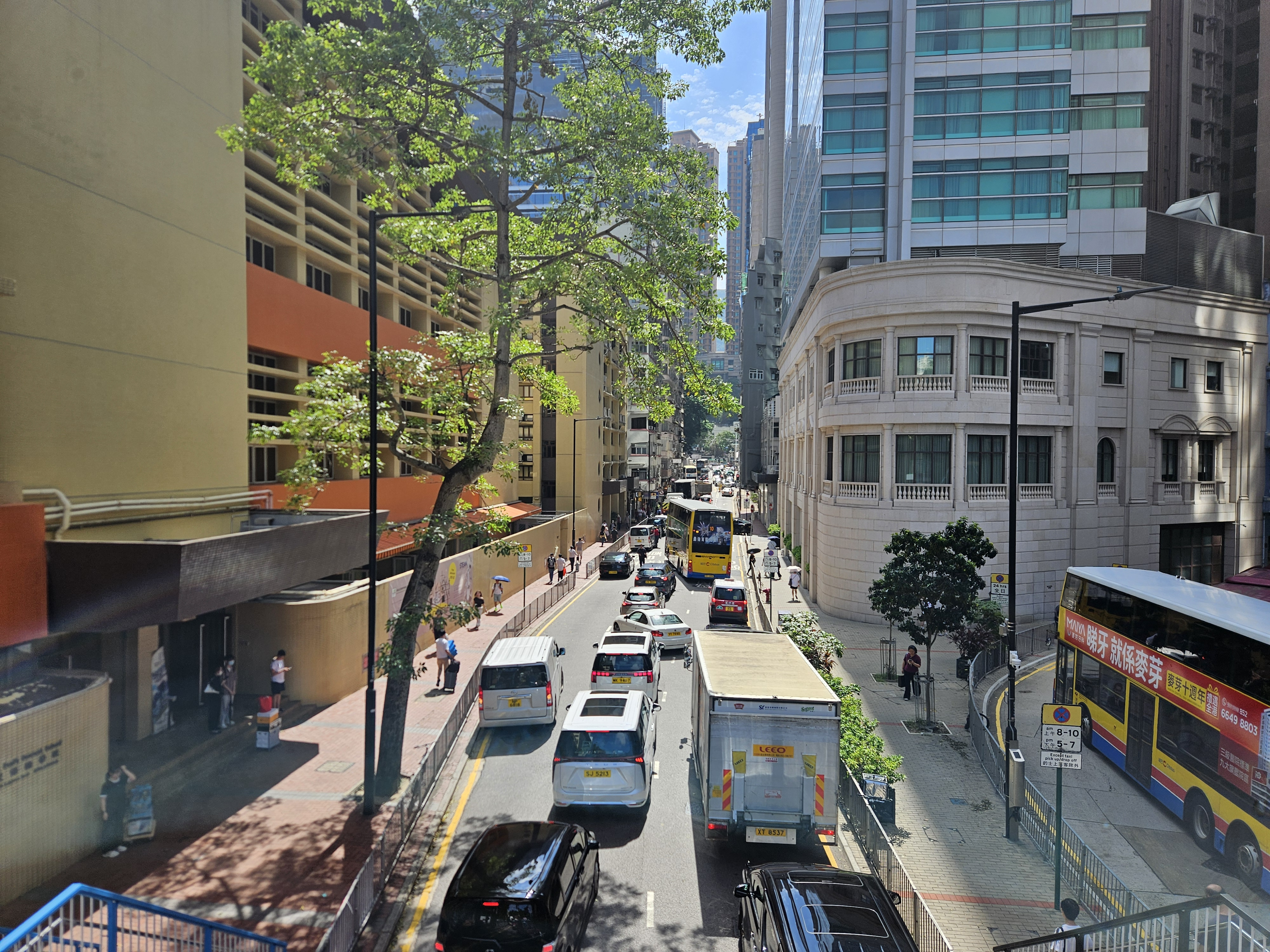
End of Leighton Road (October 2025)

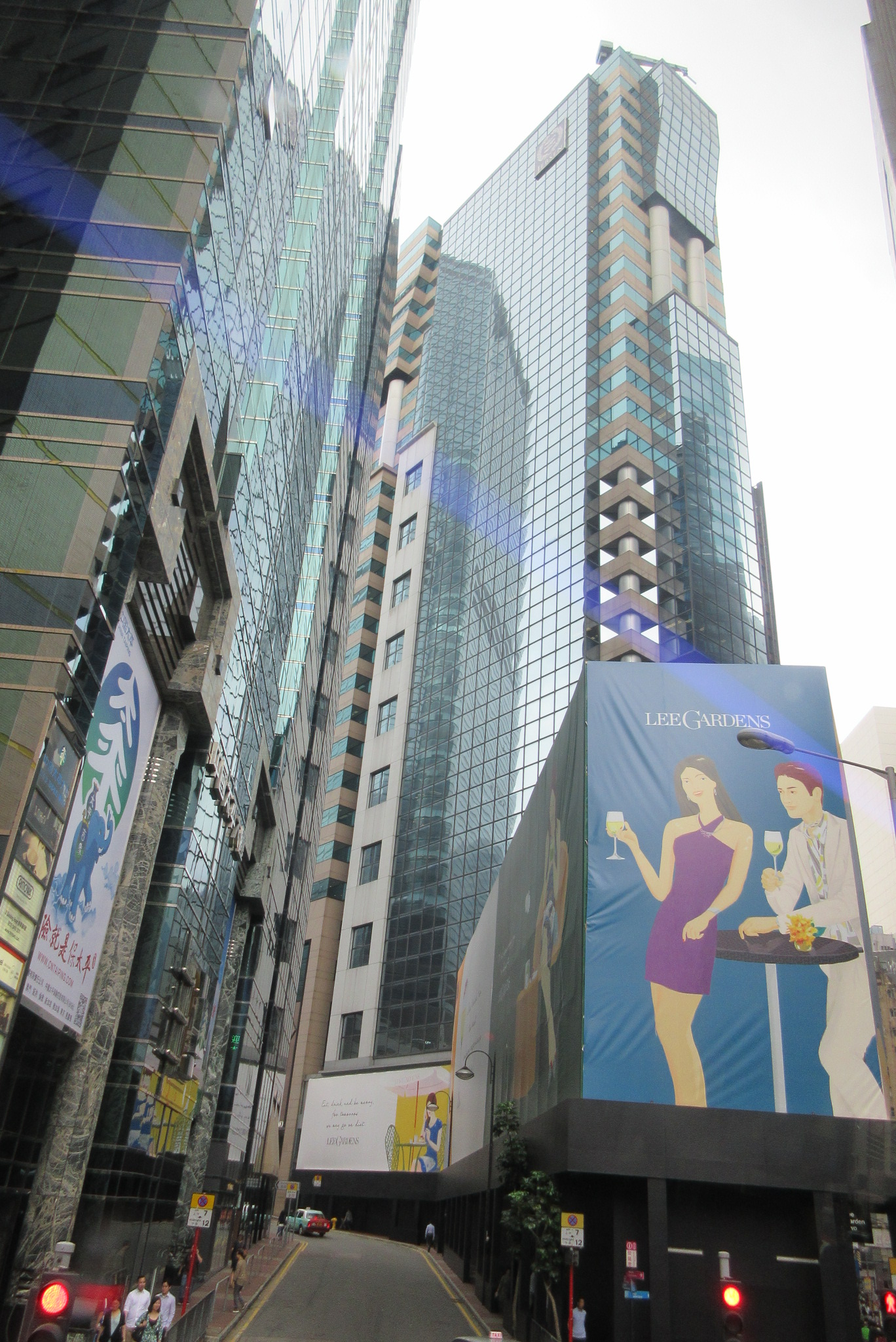
2 Leighton Road (April 2017)

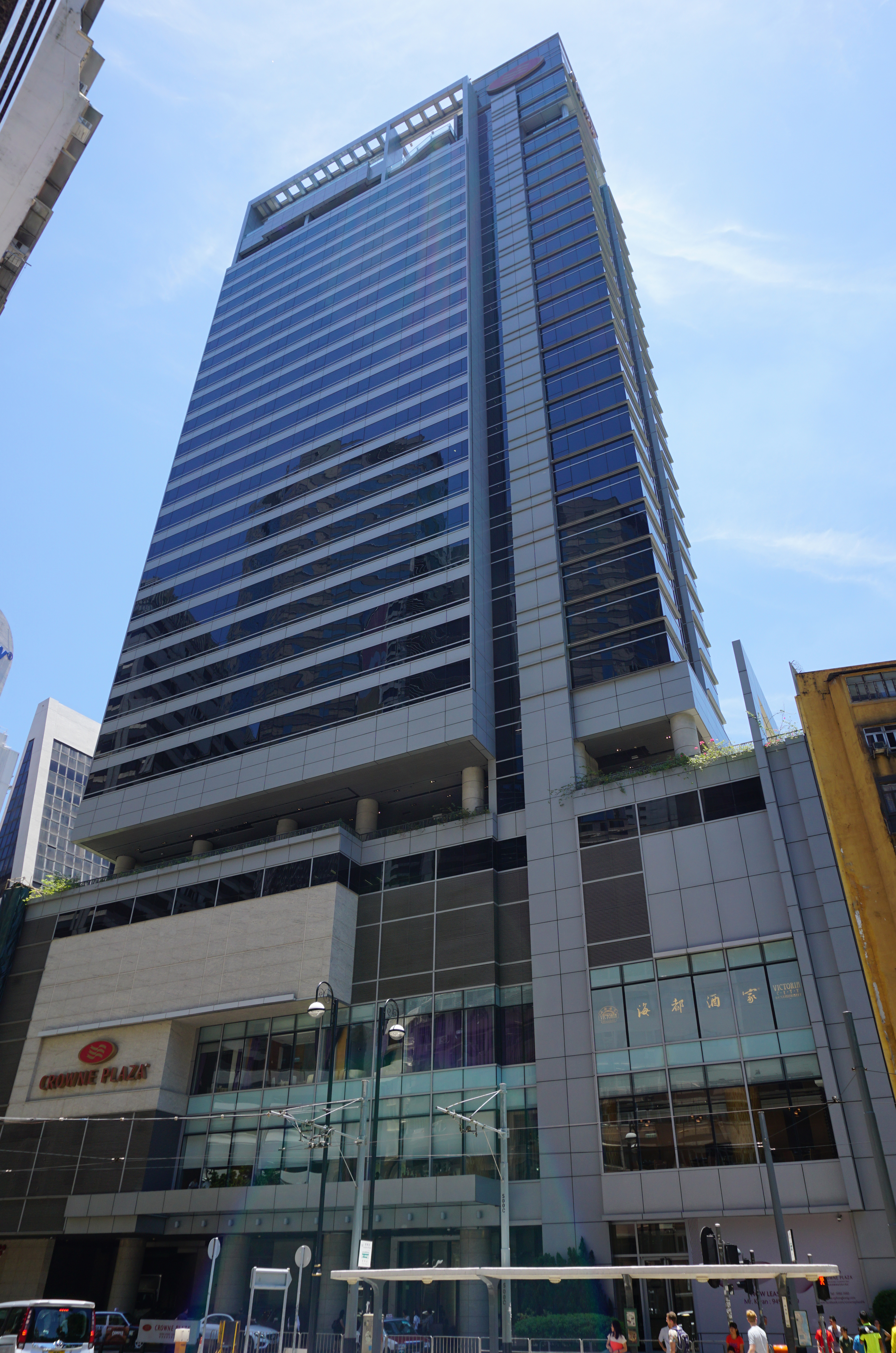
8 Leighton Road (July 2016)

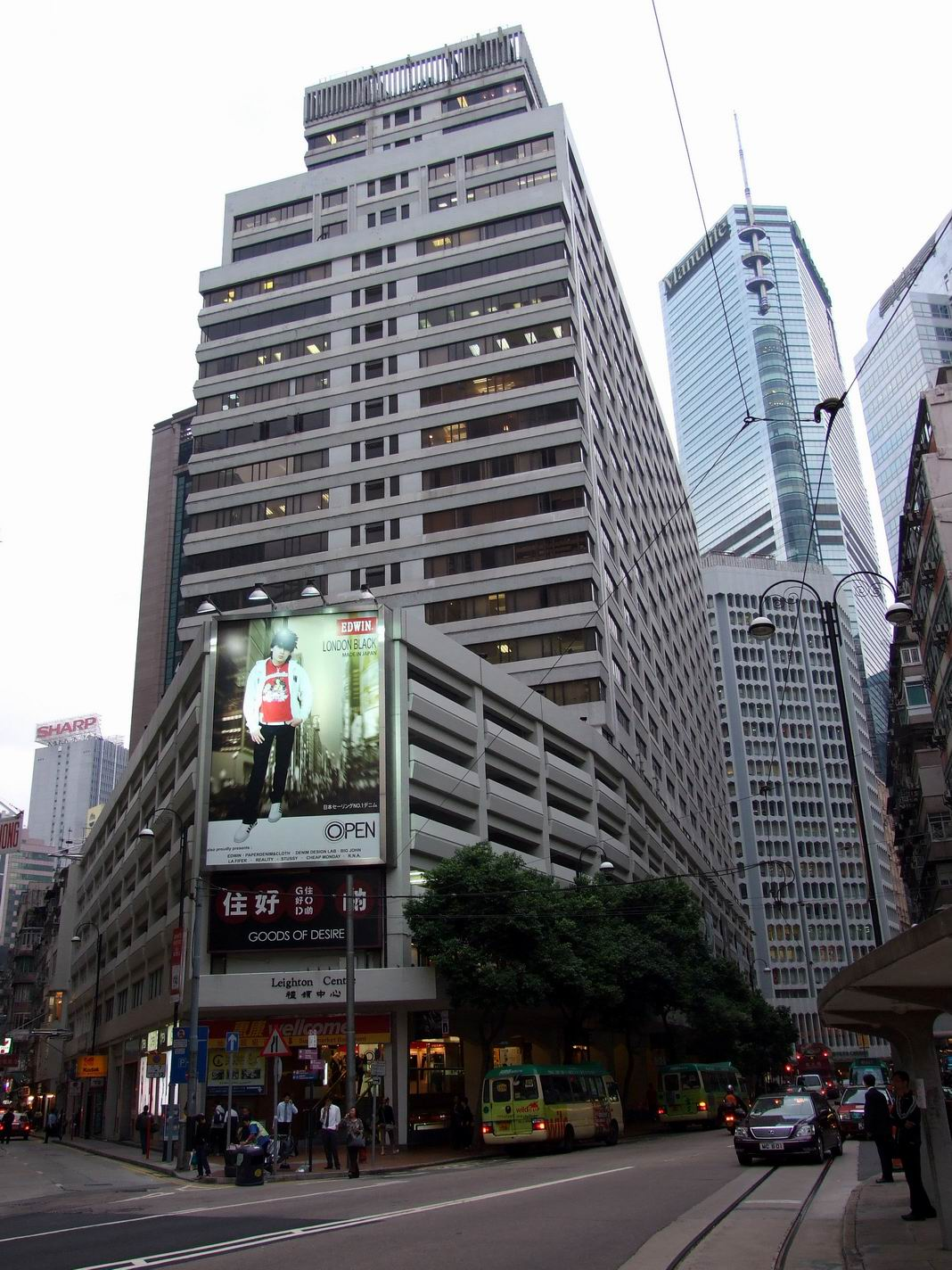
77 Leighton Road (November 2007)

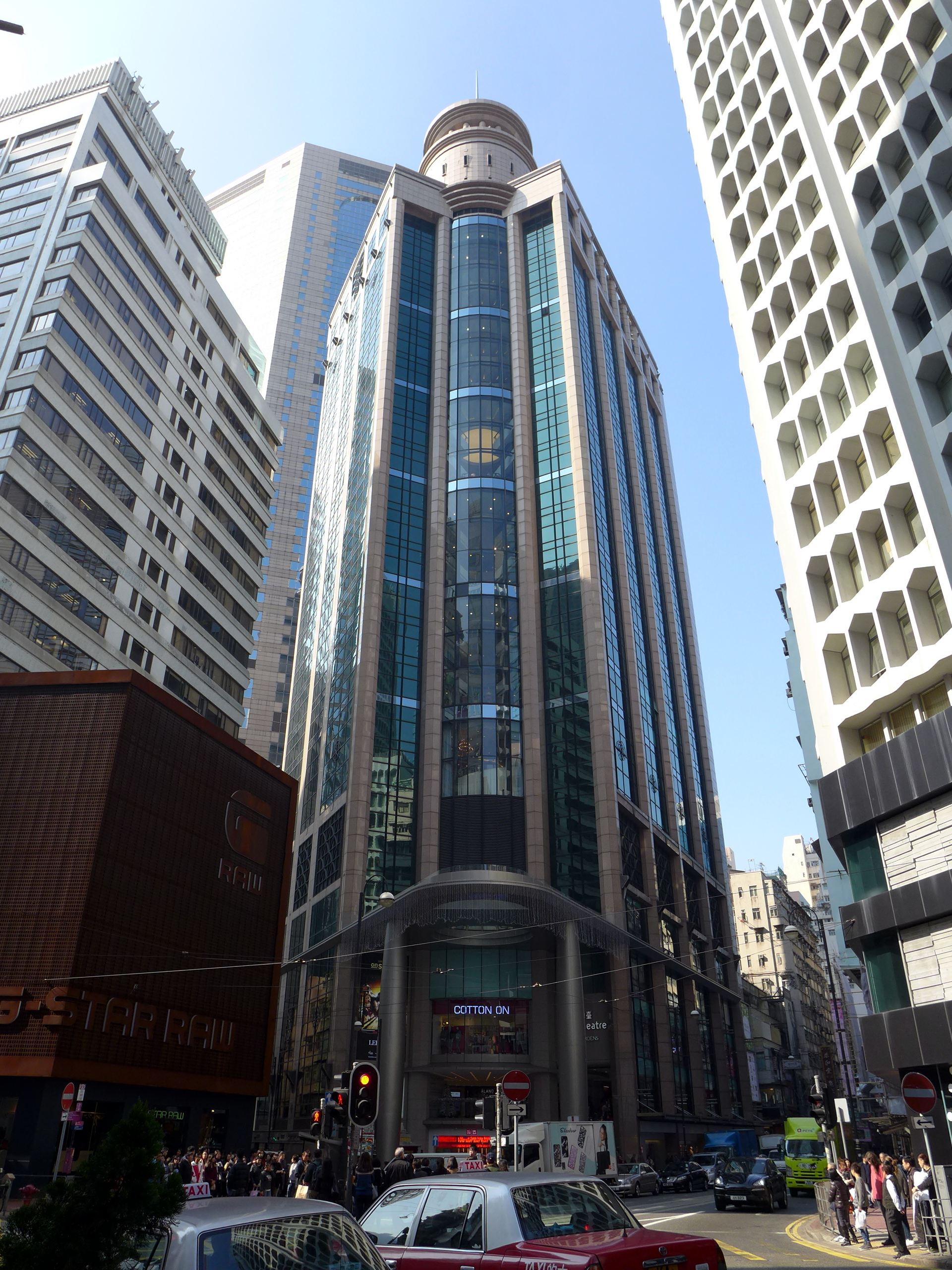
Junction with Sharp and Percival Streets; Leighton Centre, Lee Theatre Plaza, Apple Apartment (left to right) (December 2013)

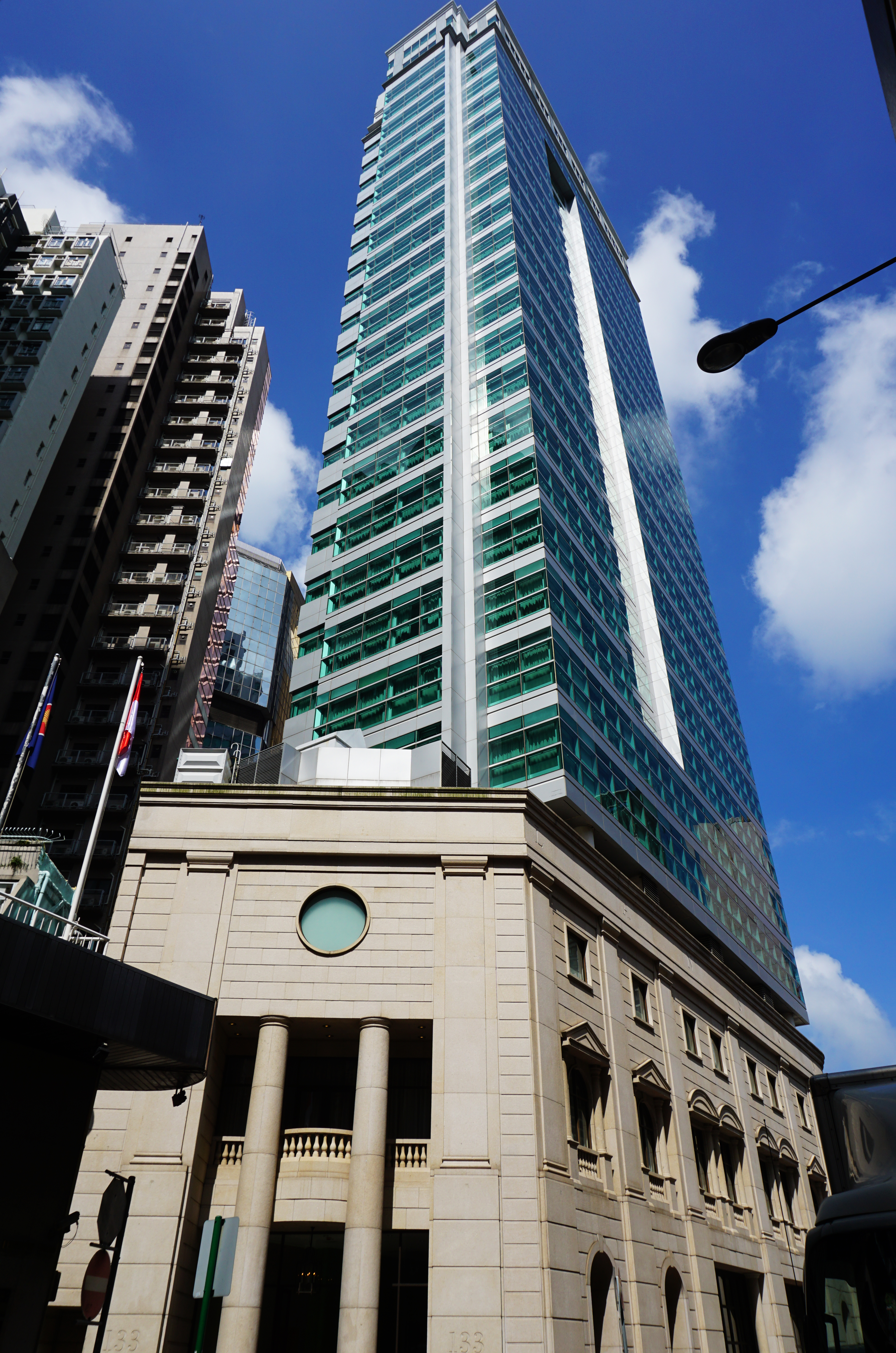
133 Leighton Road (October 2016)

== See also ==
- List of streets and roads in Hong Kong
