= Young Hysan =

Hong Kong rapper (born 1997)

Nile Sun (born February 21, 1997), known professionally as Young Hysan, is a Hong Kong rapper, singer and songwriter. He is currently signed to F Records, under Warner Music Hong Kong. He is best known for his songs "My Money" and "Still Me" from his debut project "ANTI", released in 2019. His debut studio album, "Radiance", was released in January 2021.

== Early life ==
Nile Sun was born and raised in Hong Kong and attended St. Paul's Co-educational College, where he befriended Bumblebee Yung, Healthy Lin, Lil Hanwo, Butcher Fong, and Matty Bospel, who would eventually become The Low Mays.

Sun dropped out of secondary school at the age of 16, but was eventually accepted into the University of Hong Kong and graduated in 2020.

== Career ==
=== 2015–2017: Career beginnings ===
Sun first gained attention from the Hong Kong music scene in as the creative mastermind behind the Cantonese rap group The Low Mays, whose earliest songs such as "Dragon City Drug Manor" went viral in 2016. He started releasing English trap music under "Young Hysan" in 2017, drawing his name from the infamous opium trader Lee Hysan.

=== 2019–2020: ANTI, signing to Warner Music Hong Kong ===
Sun released his debut project "ANTI" in 2019, which spawned singles such as "My Money", "ANTI" and "Still Me". The success of the project attracted the attention of Warner Music Hong Kong, who later signed him the same year.

=== 2020–present: Radiance & Radiance: The Remixes EP ===
Working with longtime collaborator Silverstrike, Sun released his debut album "Radiance" in 2021. Sun later followed that up with a remix EP of that album, featuring artists like TUJU, Pyra and Santaworldview.
