= Richard Charles Lee =

Hong Kong businessman and philanthropist

- 利銘澤
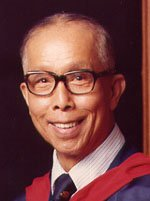

Senior Chinese Unofficial Member of the Executive Council
- Preceded by: Chau Sik-nin
- Succeeded by: Kwan Cho-yiu

Personal details
- Born: 9 March 1905 Hong Kong
- Died: 7 July 1983 (aged 78) Hong Kong
- Spouse(s): Esther Wong Yew-Pik (Pick) (黃瑤璧) (1910–1996)
- Children: Vivienne Poy
- Parent: Hysan Lee
- Education: Oxford University
- Occupation: Executive

Richard Charles Lee Ming-Chak
- Traditional Chinese: 利銘澤
- Simplified Chinese: 利铭泽
Transcriptions
Standard Mandarin
- Hanyu Pinyin: Lì Míngzé
Yue: Cantonese
- Jyutping: lei6 ming4 zaak6

Richard Charles Lee Ming-Chak, CBE (Chinese: 利銘澤; 9 March 1905 – 7 July 1983) was a Hong Kong businessman and philanthropist.

== Early life ==
Lee was born on 9 March 1905 in British Hong Kong. Lee's father was Hysan Lee, a prominent local merchant and often nicknamed the "King of Opium". Lee's younger brother was Jung Kong Lee and his ancestral home was in Xinhui, Jiangmen, Guangdong, China.

== Education ==
Lee studied at the Queen's College before he was sent to study in England and graduated from the Pembroke College, Oxford with the bachelor's and master's degrees in Engineering Science. During his study at Oxford, he was the president of the Central Union of Chinese Students of Great Britain and Ireland.

== Career ==
Lee worked at the Chinese Red Cross during the Second Sino-Japanese War and returned to Hong Kong in 1945. Besides taking part of the family business, he was also a director of more than 60 companies, including the vice-chairman of the board of directors of the N. M. Rothschild & Sons (Hong Kong) when it opened in Hong Kong in 1973. He was also chairman of the China Light and Power Company. Lee was among the first Hong Kong businessmen to invest in the mainland China after the Open Door policy in 1979. For instance, he invested in the construction of the Garden Hotel in Guangzhou with director of the PRC Overseas Chinese Affairs Office Liao Chengzhi in 1980. He also invested in the oilfield exploitation in the South China Sea.

Lee was also appointed by the colonial government to many public positions, including the Hong Kong representative of the economic commissions in Australia and Singapore, and the commissions in trade in West Africa and West Germany. Lee was appointed to the Urban Council in 1953 and the Legislative Council briefly in 1955 before he was appointed to the council again from 1959 to 65, succeeding Lo Man-wai. He was also unofficial member of the Executive Council from 1961 to 66. For his public services, he was awarded Officer and Commander of the Order of the British Empire in 1949 and 1963 respectively.

Lee was also member of the Court and Council and the Building and Finance Committees of the University of Hong Kong and the vice-chairman of the Court of the Chinese University of Hong Kong. He received honorary degrees from the two universities in 1964.

Lee was a Freemason and was the Grand Master of Freemasonry for Hong Kong and Far East District from 1961 to 1983.

== Personal ==
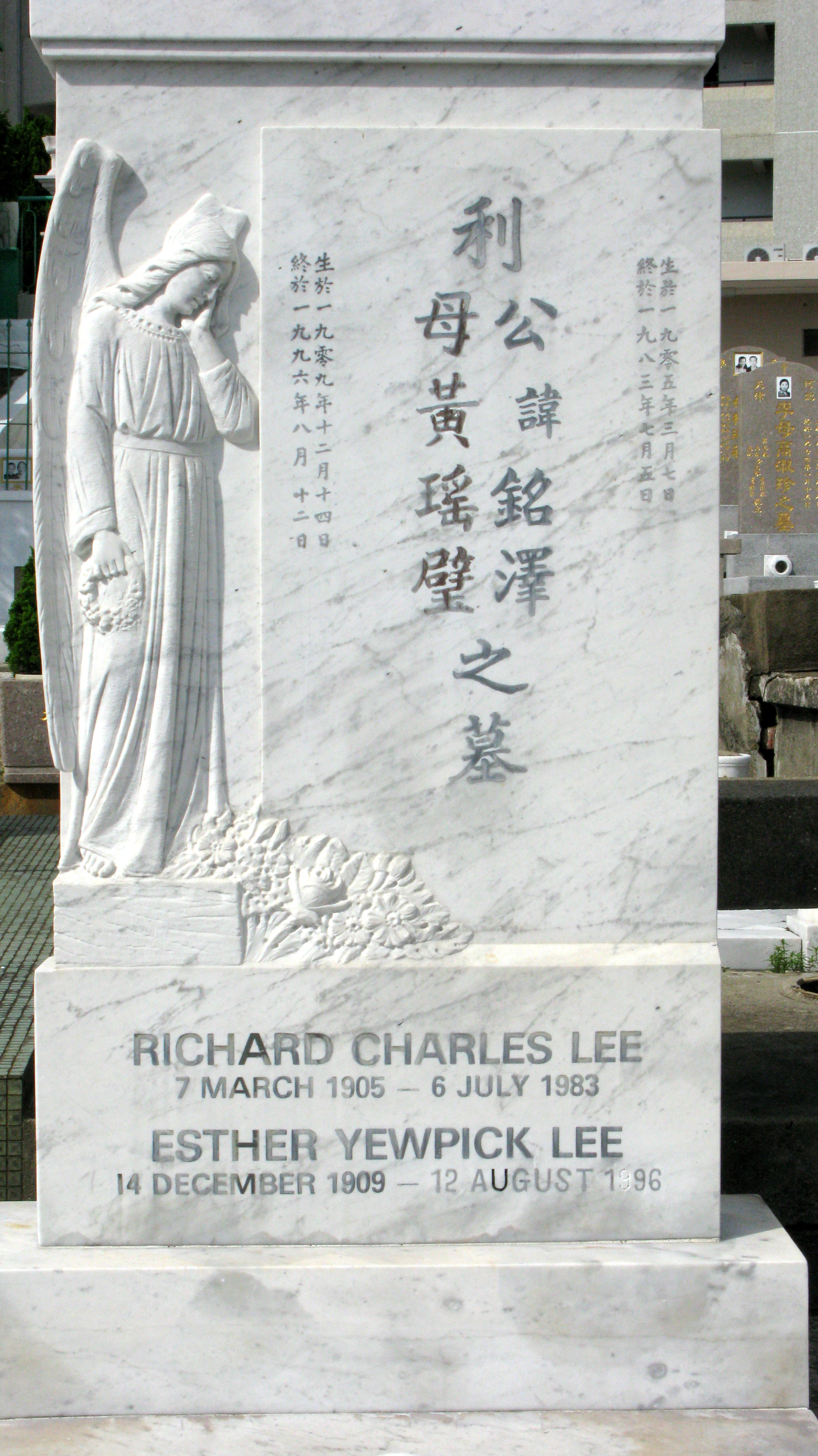
The grave of Lee and his wife

On 15 May 1941, Lee's daughter Vivienne Poy was born in British Hong Kong. She is the first Asian Canadian to be appointed to the Senate of Canada. The Richard Charles Lee Canada-Hong Kong Library was founded by Poy in her father's honour.

Lee died of heart attack on 7 July 1983 at his residence in Hong Kong, aged 78 and was survived by his wife, Esther (1910–1996), then aged 73, daughter, Vivienne, son-in-law, Neville Poy, siblings, nephews, nieces, grandchildren as well as his stepmother, Mrs. Hysan Lee.

Government offices
Preceded by Chau Sik-nin	Senior Chinese Unofficial Member in Executive Council; 1962–1966	Succeeded by Kwan Cho-yiu
