= Eslite Bookstore =

Taiwanese bookstore chain

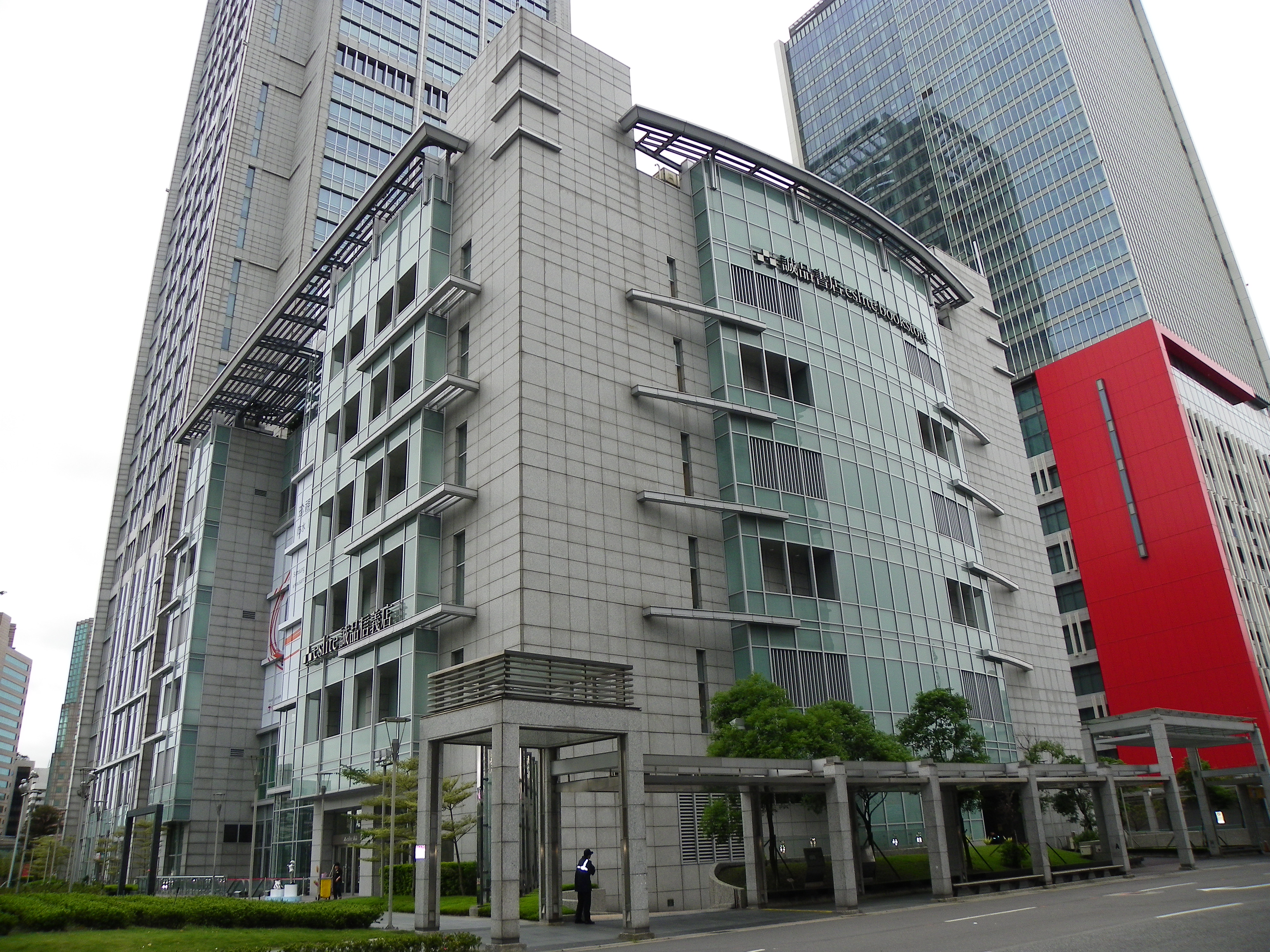
- Native name: 誠品書店
- Industry: Retailing and real estate
- Genre: Various
- Founded: 1989
- Founder: Robert Wu (吳清友)
- Headquarters: Xinyi District, Taipei, Taiwan
- Area served: Taiwan, Japan, Hong Kong, China, Malaysia
- Website: www.eslite.com

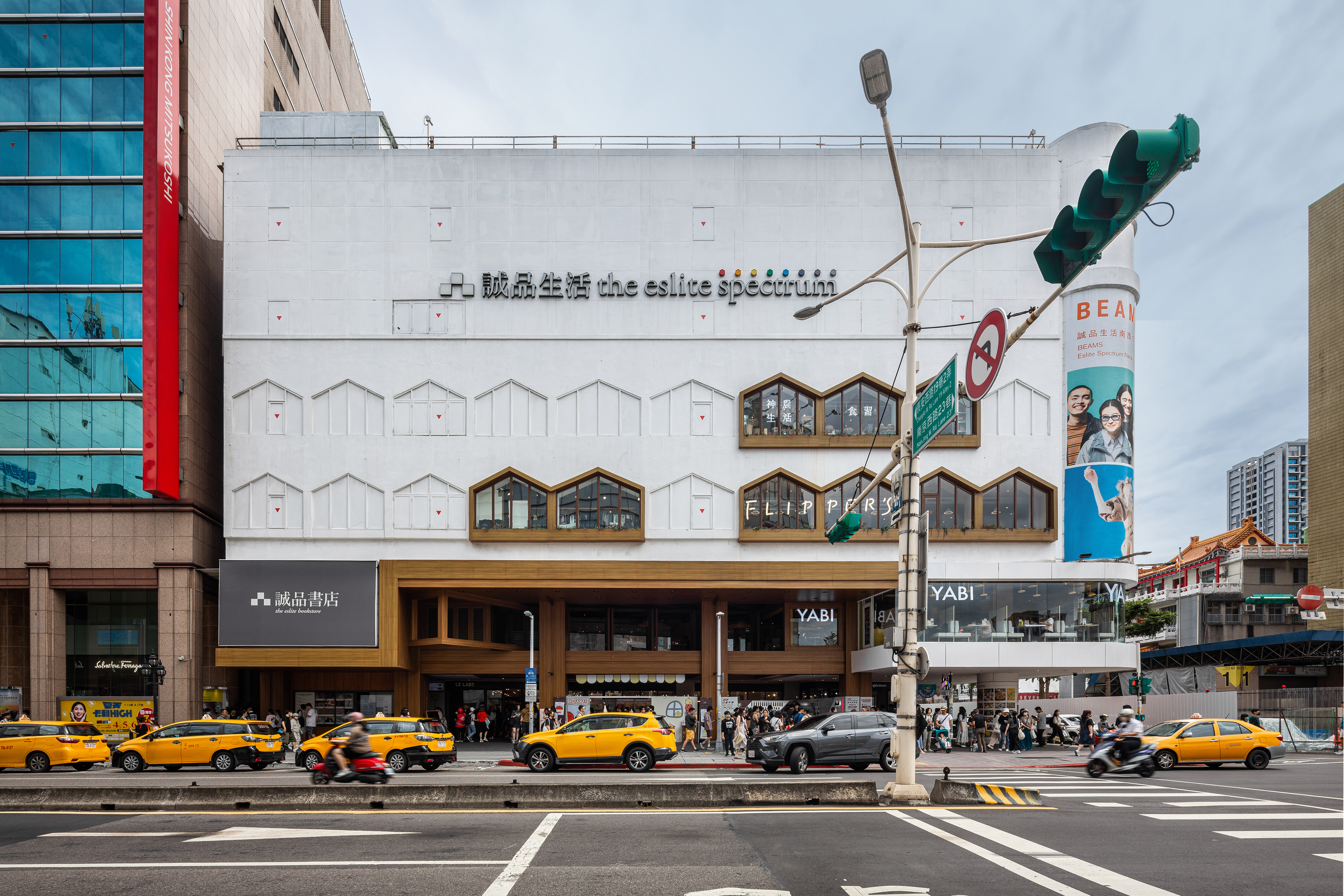
Eslite Spectrum Nanxi

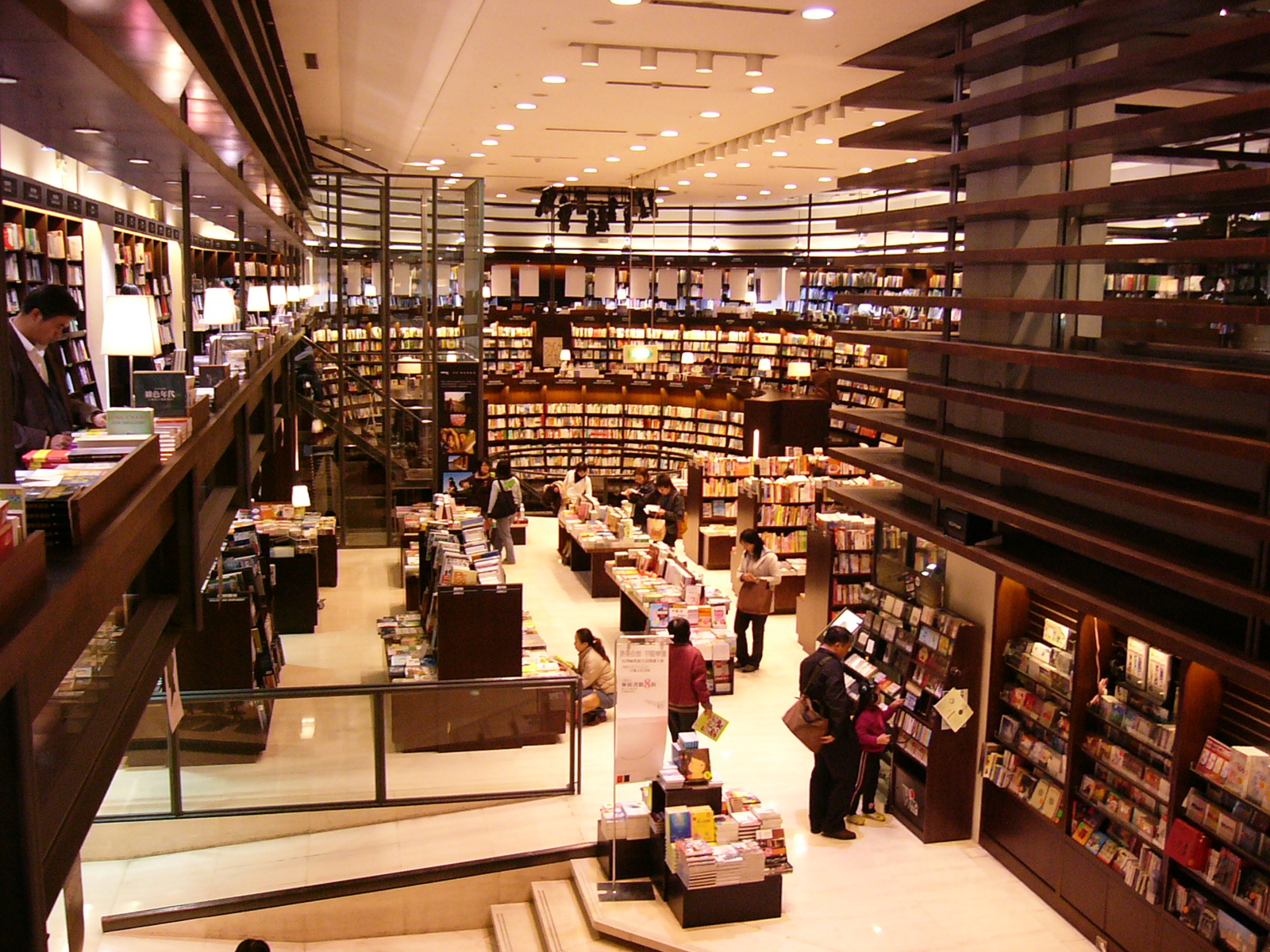
An Eslite Bookstore in a Chung-yo Department store, Taichung.

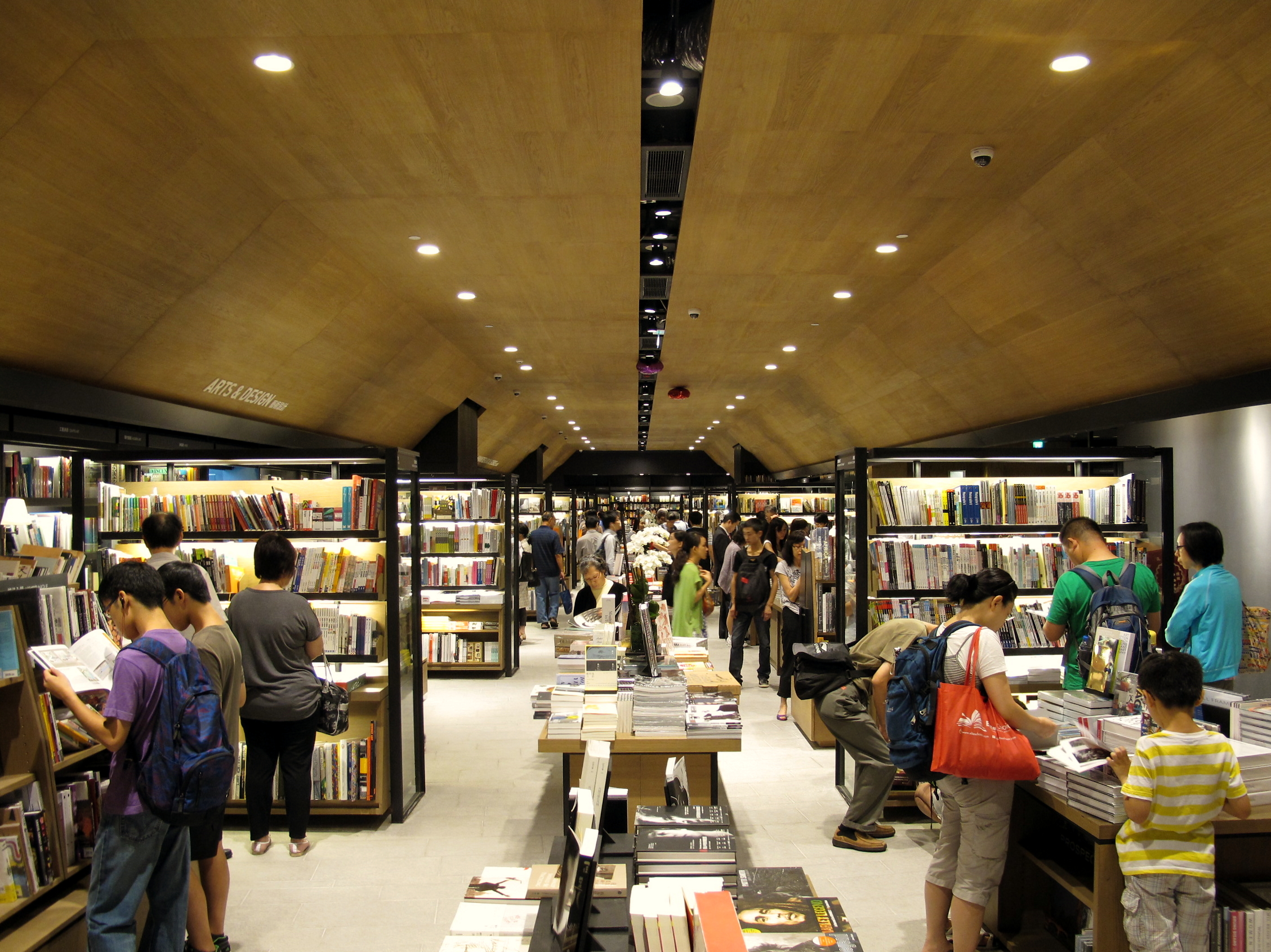
An Eslite Bookstore in Hysan Place, Hong Kong

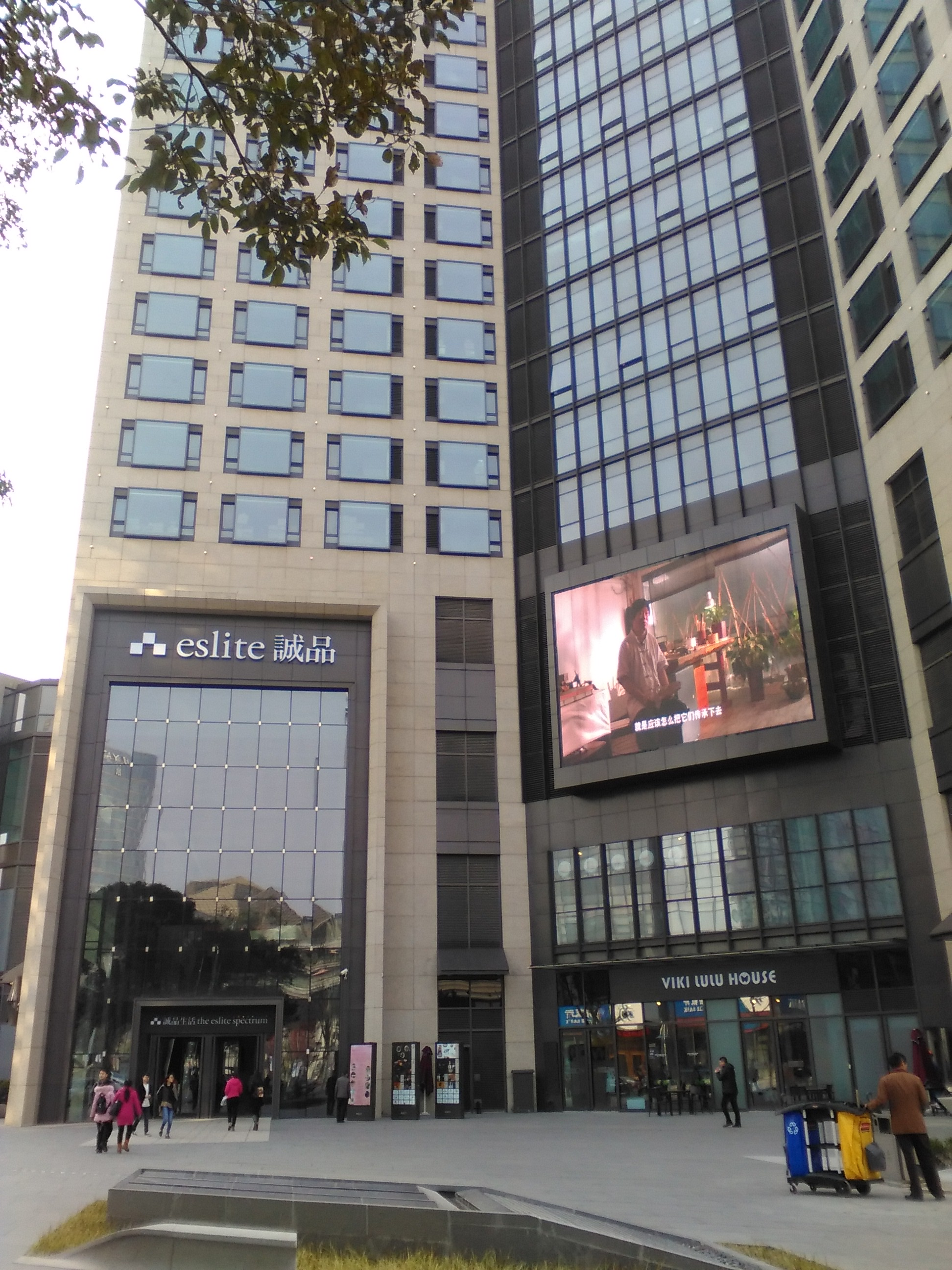
Eslite Spectrum Suzhou Store in Suzhou Industrial Park, China

Eslite Bookstore (Chinese: 誠品書店; pinyin: Chéngpǐn Shūdiàn) is one of the largest retail bookstore chains in Taiwan. It also offers one of the largest selections of English-language publications and translation materials in Taiwan.

Headquartered in Xinyi District, Taipei, the chain has 38 branches in Taiwan—mostly in urban areas, such as Taipei, New Taipei, Keelung, Yilan, Zhongli, Hsinchu, Taichung, Chiayi, Tainan, Kaohsiung, and Pingtung—and several overseas branches.

== History ==
Eslite was established in 1989 by Robert Wu Ching-yu. The first shop opened on 12 March 1989 on Dunhua South Road, Daan District, Taipei, with a focus and emphasis on art and humanities-related books. Since then, the company has expanded and set up more shops and increased its range of titles on offer.

On the store's tenth anniversary, the flagship Dunhua South Road store began operating 24 hours a day—Taiwan's first all-night bookstore.

In 2006, Eslite opened a store in Taipei's Xinyi District. It became the chain's flagship and only 24-hour store after the Dunhua location closed on 31 May 2020. It closed on 24 December 2023 after site landlord Uni-President Group did not renew the lease.

On 20 January 2024, the Eslite branch at Songshan Cultural and Creative Park, known as Eslite Spectrum Songyan, became the chain's 24-hour location.

The first Eslite Bookstore outside Taiwan opened in Hysan Place in Causeway Bay, Hong Kong, in 2012. It sold 706,000 books in 2014. The company opened a second Hong Kong location at Star House (Star Annex of Harbour City), Tsim Sha Tsui, in 2015.

In July 2014, the Taipei Times reported that Eslite Hong Kong had removed books about Tibet, such as those by Wang Lixiong, and "issued an in-company document prohibiting its workers to make comments about the company on social media without approval". The company had plans to expand into mainland China.

On 29 November 2015, Eslite Bookstore opened its first branch in mainland China, in the city of Suzhou, Jiangsu.

On 17 December 2022, Eslite opened its first bookstore in Southeast Asia: Eslite Spectrum in the heart of Kuala Lumpur, Malaysia.

== Related businesses ==
Eslite also expanded into retail, and opened Eslite Mall. Other related businesses include:

- Eslite Musicstore
- Eslite Coffeehouse
- Eslite Winery
- Eslite Teahouse
- Eslite Gallery, founded in 1989. It is one of Taiwan's most prestigious contemporary art galleries.

=== Chronology of related businesses ===
- 1974: established Chen-Jian Corp, importing whole set kitchenware.
- 1989: established Eslite Corp, first Eslite bookstore built at Taipei Dunhua South Road.
- 1996: established Eslite Retail Group.
- 2000: established Eslite Transportation Group, expanded to food and drinks, appliances, and online sales, established Eslite Global Network Corp.
- 2001: established Eslite Logistics Corp at Nankan, Taoyuan.
- 2002: Eslite Retail group and Transportation group combined into Life group, introduced Eslite's operation motto as humanity, art, creativity, and life.
- At midnight on 1 January 2006, Eslite's new flagship bookstore, located in Taipei's Xinyi District, opened for business. With about 8,000 m² of floor space, it became the largest bookstore in Taiwan.

== See also ==
- List of companies of Taiwan
- Page One
- Taiwanese art
