= Lee Garden One =

Hong Kong building complex

Manulife Plaza
- 宏利保險大廈
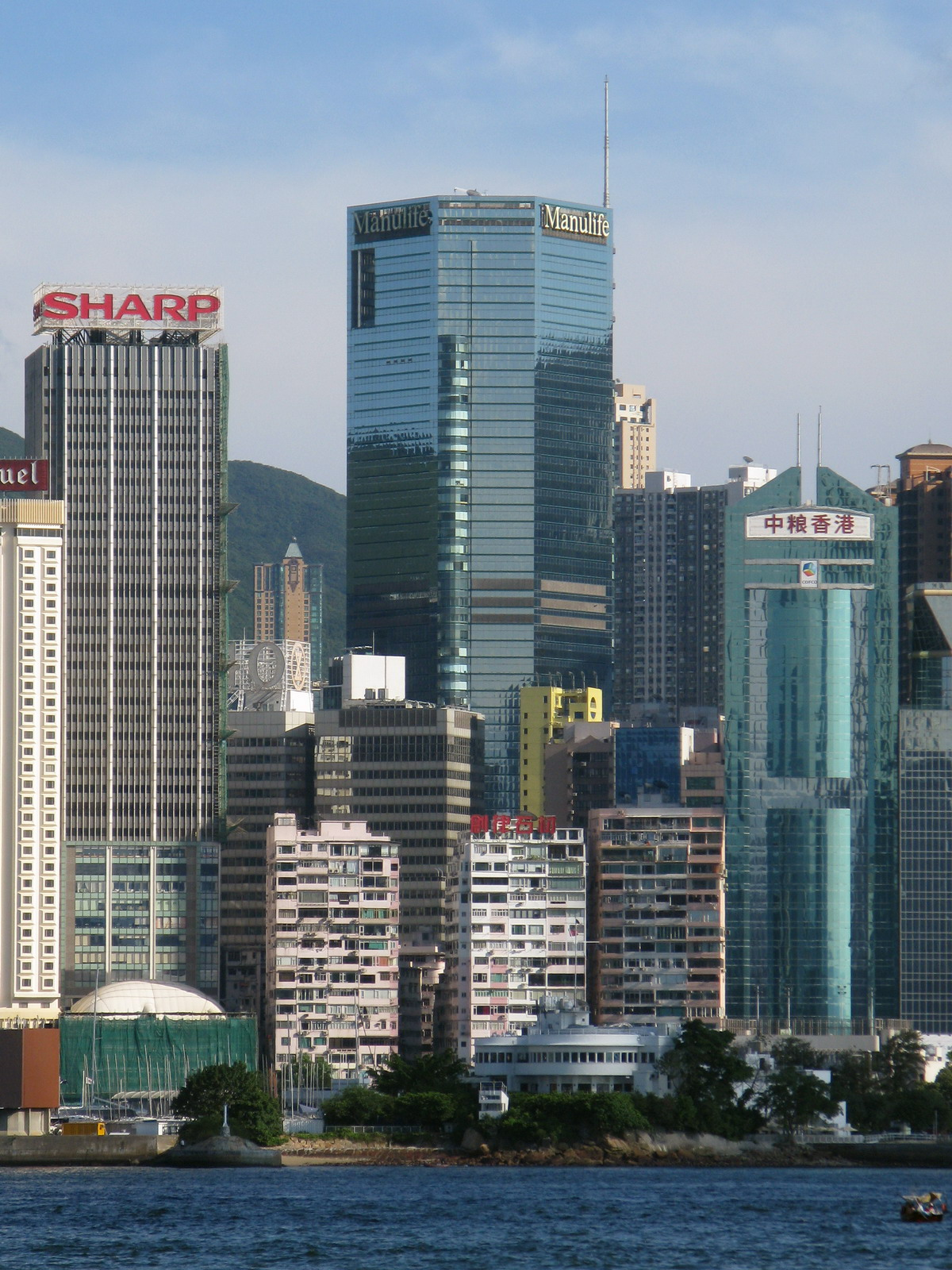
- Interactive map of the Manulife Plaza area

General information
- Status: Completed
- Location: 33 Hysan Avenue, Causeway Bay, Hong Kong
- Coordinates: 22°16′42.0″N 114°11′04.6″E
- Construction started: 1996; 30 years ago
- Opening: April 1997; 28 years ago
- Cost: $166,700,000 HKD

Height
- Architectural: 240.35 metres (789 ft)
- Top floor: 198.0 metres (650 ft)

Technical details
- Floor count: 52, plus 4 basement floors
- Floor area: 112300m^{2}

Design and construction
- Architect: DLN Architects & Engineers
- Developer: Hysan Development Company
- Main contractor: Aoki Corporation

Lee Garden One
- Traditional Chinese: 宏利保險大廈
- Simplified Chinese: 宏利保险大厦
Transcriptions
Standard Mandarin
- Hanyu Pinyin: Hóng Lì Bǎoxiǎn Dàshà
Yue: Cantonese
- Yale Romanization: Wàhng leih bóu hím daaih hah
- Jyutping: Wang4 lei6 bou2 him2 daai6 ha6

Lee Gardens One
- Traditional Chinese: 利園一期
- Simplified Chinese: 利园一期
Transcriptions
Standard Mandarin
- Hanyu Pinyin: Lì Yuán Yī Qī
Yue: Cantonese
- Yale Romanization: Leih yún yāt kèih
- Jyutping: Lei6 jyun2 jat1 kei4

Manulife Plaza, also known as Lee Garden One, is an office skyscraper in Causeway Bay, Hong Kong Island, Hong Kong. The triangular-shaped tower stands 789 ft (240 m) tall and contains 52 floors of office space. The building is currently the 16th tallest in Hong Kong and the tallest in Causeway Bay. It also has seven-storey podium hosting a shopping centre. It serves as the main headquarters of Manulife Hong Kong, a subsidiary of Canadian insurance company Manulife.

== History ==
The site was developed in the 1920s as part of Lee Garden by Hysan Lee. The Lee Gardens Hotel opened in 1971 and was demolished in August 1994 to make way for the current building.

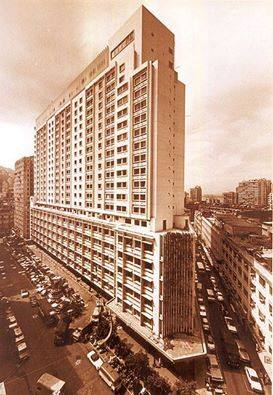
the previous building on the site - Lee Garden Hotel

== Shopping centre ==
The base of Lee Garden One is a shopping centre, opened in October 1997. International luxury brands include Louis Vuitton, Chanel, Hermès, Dior, Cartier, BVLGARI, Joyce Boutique, Valentino. And the 4th to 5th floors of the mall are restaurants, respectively West Villa Restaurant and An Nam.

== See also ==
- List of tallest buildings in Hong Kong
