= Lee Garden =

Coordinates: 22.27869°N 114.18483°E

- Traditional Chinese: 利園
- Simplified Chinese: 利园
Transcriptions
Standard Mandarin
- Hanyu Pinyin: Lì Yuán
Yue: Cantonese
- Jyutping: lei6 jyun4*2

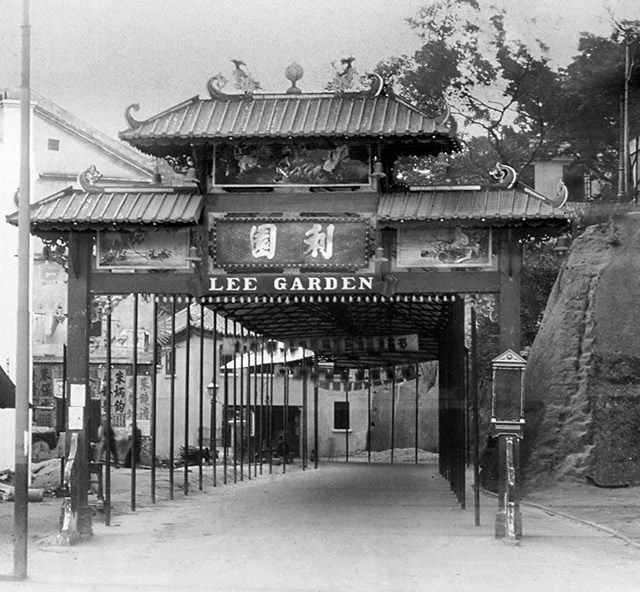
Lee Garden in 1920s

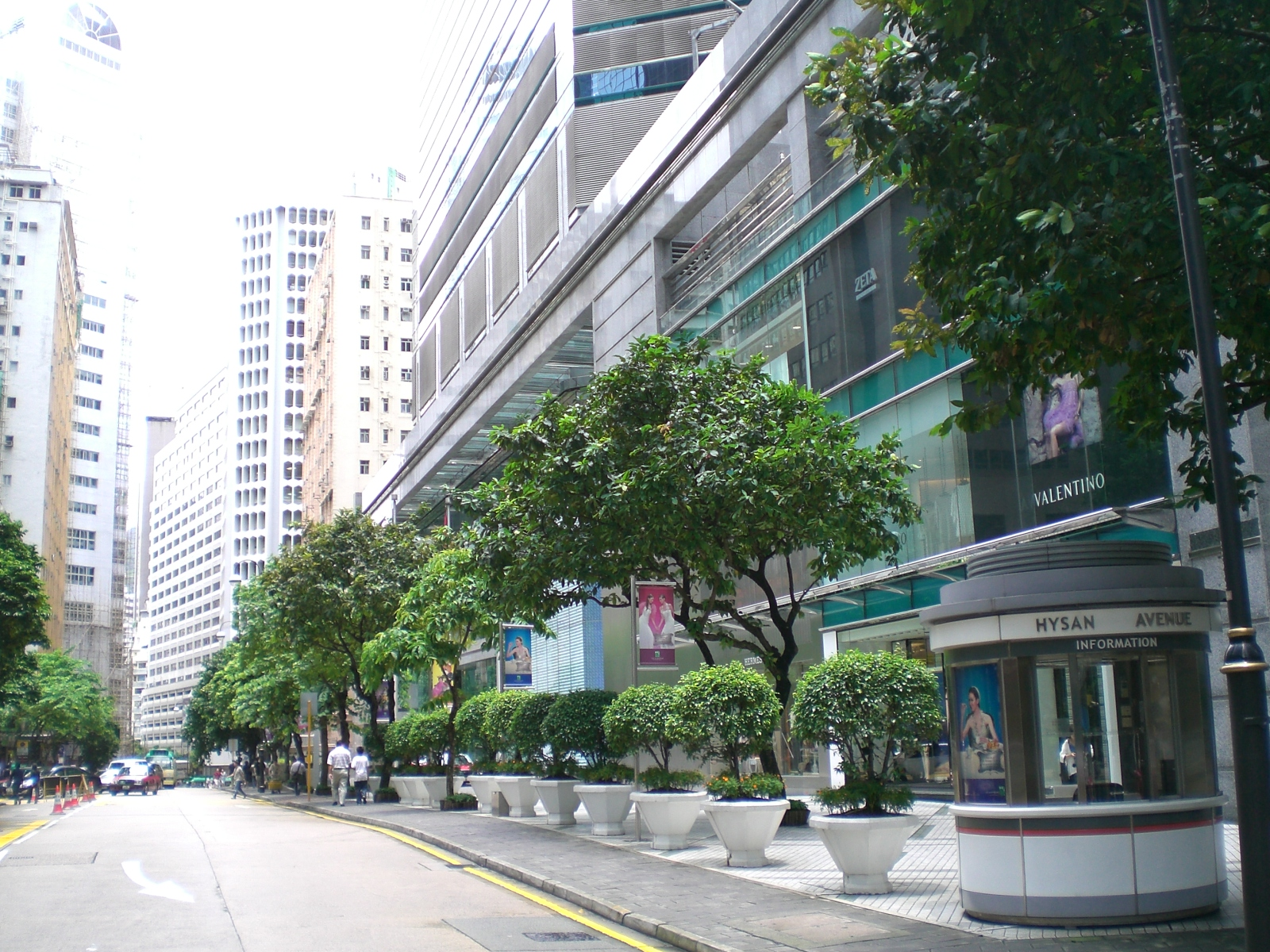
Lee Garden One in Hysan Avenue.

Lee Gardens (Chinese: 利園) was a theme park, then present day a collection of shopping malls and property development in East Point west of Causeway Bay on the Hong Kong Island in Hong Kong, approximately the area between Percival Street, Hennessy Road and Leighton Road. It was built on a hill called East Point Hill also known as Jardine's Hill.

In the early 19th century, the land of East Point, including the hill, was largely owned by Jardine Matheson and as a result the hill was known as Jardine's Hill. In 1923, Hong Kong tycoon Lee Hysan bought the Jardine's Hill property, west of Causeway Bay from Jardines for HK$3.8 million, and developed it into Lee Garden Amusement Park, making Causeway Bay a popular entertainment destination. The site has since been redeveloped as a commercial development which includes office accommodation and a shopping mall

The area now contains Lee Garden One (formerly called Manulife Plaza), Two, Three, Five and Six. They are owned by Hysan Development.

== See also ==
- Mount Parish
- Leighton Hill
- Caroline Hill
- Morrison Hill
- Government Hill
- Mount Shadwell
- Kornhill
