= Vivienne Poy =

Canadian politician (born 1941)

The Honourable Vivienne Poy
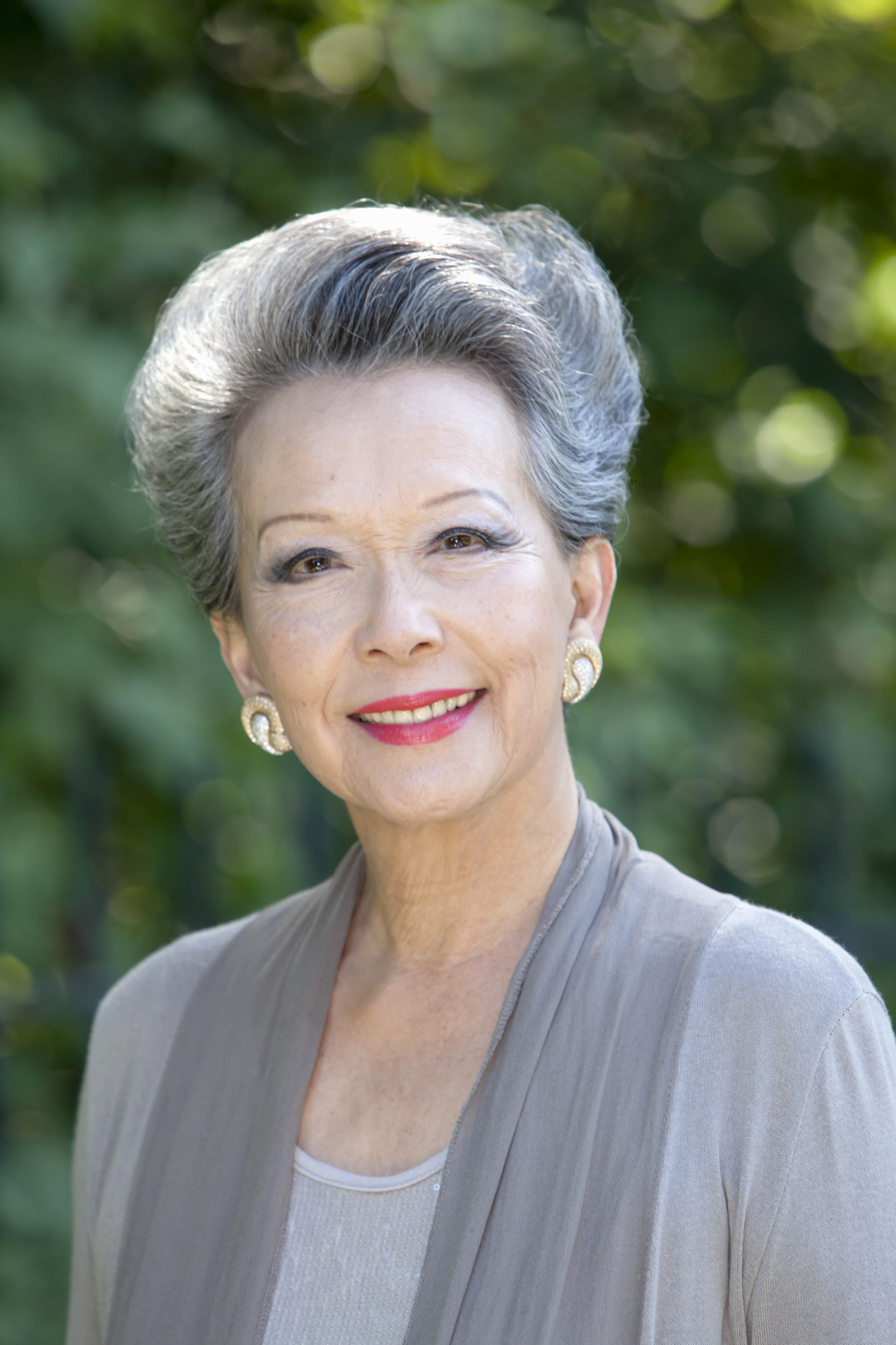

Canadian Senator from Ontario
- In office September 17, 1998 – September 17, 2012
- Appointed by: Jean Chrétien

31st Chancellor of the University of Toronto
- In office 2003–2006
- President: Robert J. Birgeneau; Frank Iacobucci (interim); Vivek Goel (acting); David Naylor
- Preceded by: Hal Jackman
- Succeeded by: David Peterson

Personal details
- Born: May 15, 1941 (age 85) Hong Kong
- Party: Liberal
- Spouse: Neville Poy
- Children: 3
- Education: St. Paul's Co-educational College; McGill University; Seneca College; University of Toronto
- Occupation: Politician; businesswoman; author

Vivienne Poy (née Lee; Chinese: 利德蕙; Jyutping: Lei6 Dak1-Wai6; Cantonese Yale: Leih Dāk-Waih; pinyin: Lì Déhuì; born May 15, 1941) is a Canadian businesswoman and author. She served as a member of the Senate of Canada from 1998 until her retirement in 2012.

== Early life and education ==
On May 15, 1941, Poy was born in British Hong Kong. She is the daughter of Richard Charles Lee Ming-Chak and Esther Yiu Pik Wong (黃瑤璧; Cantonese: Wong Yiu-Pik, Pinyin: Huáng Yáobì). Poy's paternal grandfather was Hysan Lee, who was tied to the Hong Kong opium refinery business and also land development in the early 1900s.

In 1959, Poy was a student in Canada. She is a graduate of St. Paul's Co-educational College (in Hong Kong), McGill University, Seneca College and the University of Toronto.

== Career ==
Poy was appointed by Prime Minister Jean Chretien to the Senate in 1998, becoming the first Canadian senator of Asian ancestry. For 14 years, Poy served as president of Vivienne Poy Mode, a fashion design company that she founded 1981. She was selected as Chancellor of the University of Toronto in December 2002 and served until 2006.

=== Asian Heritage Month ===
In 2001, the Senate of Canada adopted a motion put forth by Poy to designate the month of May as Asian Heritage Month in Canada and it was officially declared as such the following year.

=== Canada's National Anthem ===
Poy was an early proponent of changing the lyrics of Canada's National Anthem to more inclusive wording by changing the line "in all thy sons command" to "in all of us command. Her argument centered around the fact that the proposed wording was the original lyric after having been changed to "sons" during the First World War in order to encourage young men to enlist. Poy put sponsored the change twice with sufficient votes but the action was halted each time due to prorogation of Parliament.

=== Famous Five Monument ===
Poy was an instrumental sponsor for the creation of a monument to The Famous Five.

== Publications ==
Poy has authored a number of non-fiction books including:

- Heroes & Gamblers: Tales of Survival and Good Fortune of the Poy Family - Calyan Publishing Limited, Toronto, 2015.
- Passage to Promise Land - McGill/Queen's University Press, Montreal & Kingston, London, Ithaca, 2013.
- Profit, Victory, and Sharpness: the Lees of Hong Kong - York Centre for Asian Research, York University, Hong Kong Institute of Education, 2006.
- Citizenship and Immigration: the Chinese-Canadian Experience - The Nortel Networks' Canadian Studies Address No. 1 University of Wollongong Press and the Centre for Canadian-Australian Studies, Wollongong, Australia, 2002.
- Building Bridges: the Life and Times of Richard Charles Lee Hong Kong 1905 - 1983 - Calyan Publishing Limited, Toronto, 1998.
- A River Named Lee - Calyan Publishing Limited, Toronto, 1995.

== Honours ==
- International Women's Day Award (1996)
- Arbor Award for Outstanding Volunteer Service, University of Toronto (1997)
- Queen Elizabeth II Golden Jubilee Medal (2002)
- Officer of the Order of St. John (2003)
- Canada's Top 100 Most Powerful Women, Trailblazer category, Women's Executive Network (2003)
- Eid-ul-Fitr Award, Association of Progressive Muslims of Canadas (2005)
- Distinguished Alumni Award, Seneca College (2004)
- Golden Mountain Achievement Award, Victoria, BC (2008)
- Chinese Canadian Legends Association (2009)
- Top 25 Canadian Immigrant Award Winner, Canadian Immigrant magazine (2010)
- Queen Elizabeth II Diamond Jubilee Medal (2012)
- NAAAP100 Award, National Association of Asian American Professionals (2012)
- Most Successful Women Award, Jessica Magazine (2013)
- Lifetime Achievement Award, Association of Chinese Canadian Entrepreneurs (2014)
- Heritage Award, Transformation Awards, Diversity Expo (2014)
- G. Raymond Chang Award, University of the West Indies, (2016)

== Personal life ==
Poy's husband is Dr. Neville Poy, a retired plastic surgeon, and together they have 3 sons: Ashley, Carter and Justin to whom she donated a kidney in 2008. Poy's sister-in-law is Adrienne Clarkson, who served as Governor General of Canada from 1999 to 2005.

== See also ==
- Chinese Canadians
- List of Ontario senators

Academic offices
Preceded by Hal Jackman	Chancellor of the University of Toronto; 2003–2006	Succeeded by David Peterson
