= Hysan Place =

Shopping centre in Causeway Bay, Hong Kong

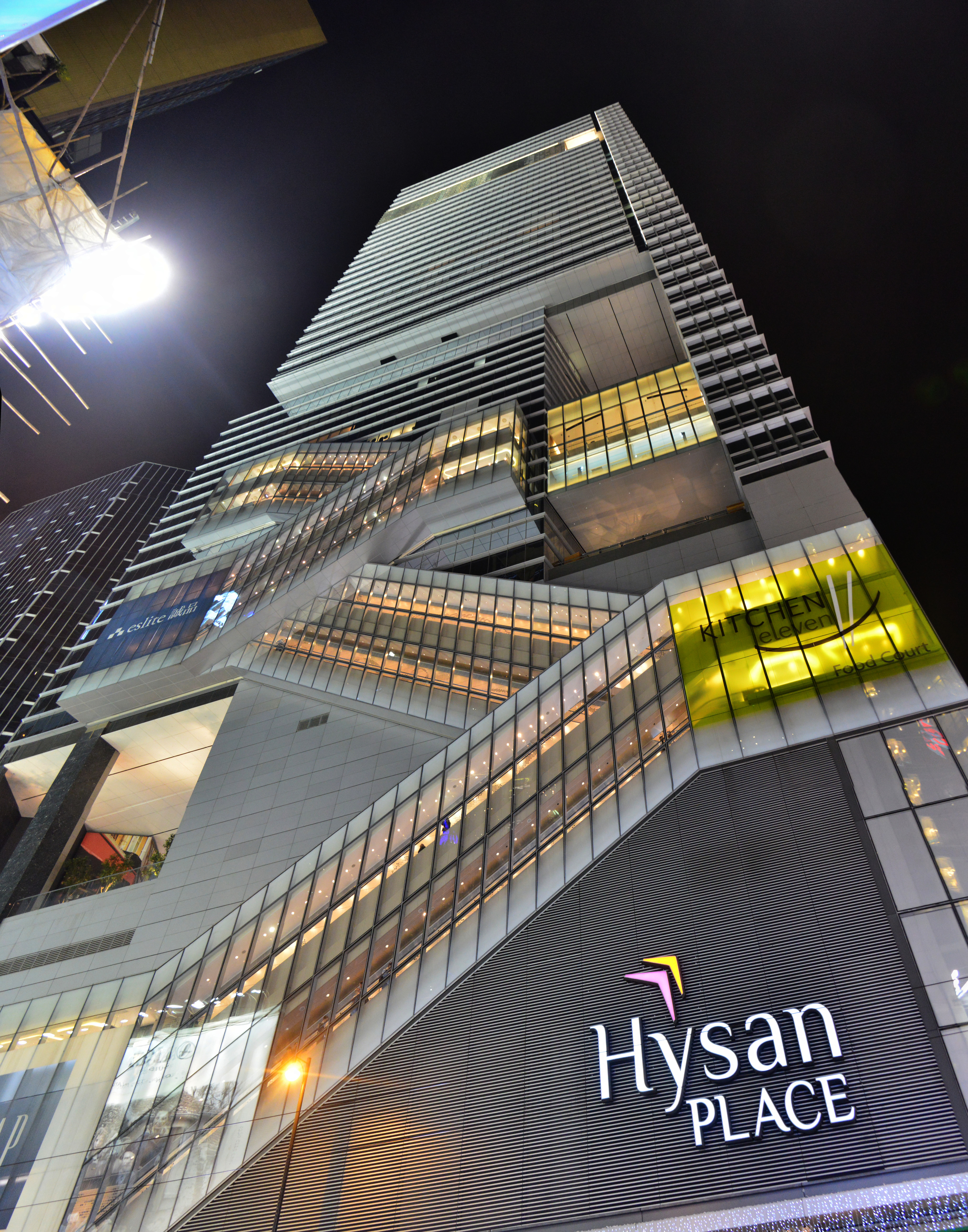
- Hysan Place in November 2013
- Location: Causeway Bay, Hong Kong
- Coordinates: 22.2798°N 114.1836°E
- Address: 500 Hennessy Road
- Opened: 10 August 2012; 14 years ago
- Developer: Hysan Development Company Limited
- Floor area: Over 710,000 sq ft (66,000 m^{2})
- Floors: 40 (17 shopping floors)
- Website: https://www.leegardens.com.hk

Hysan Place
- Traditional Chinese: 希慎廣場
- Simplified Chinese: 希慎广场
- Jyutping: hei1 san6 gwong2 coeng4
Transcriptions
Standard Mandarin
- Hanyu Pinyin: Xīshèn Guǎngchǎng
Yue: Cantonese
- Jyutping: hei1 san6 gwong2 coeng4

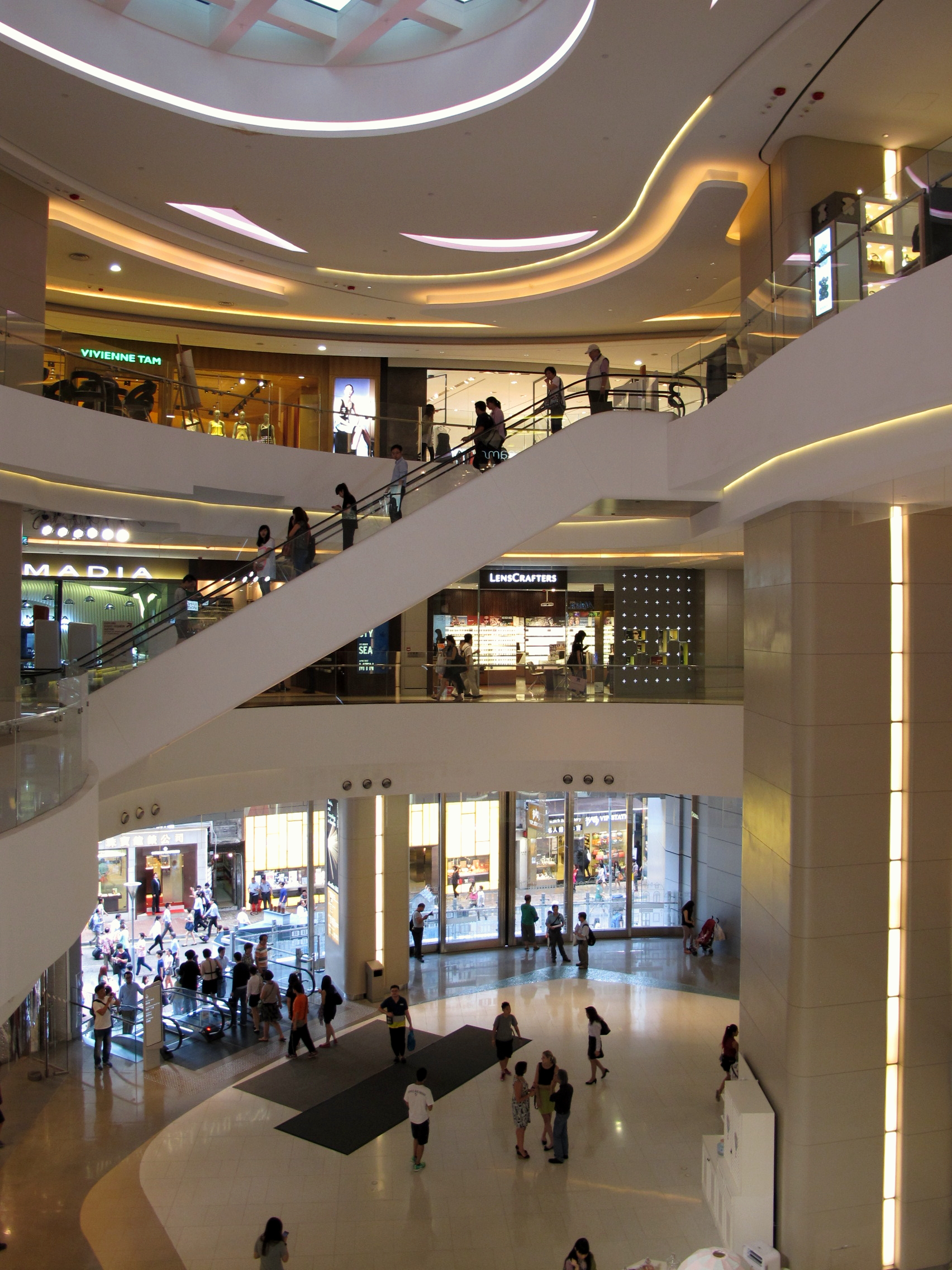
Hysan Place ventricle

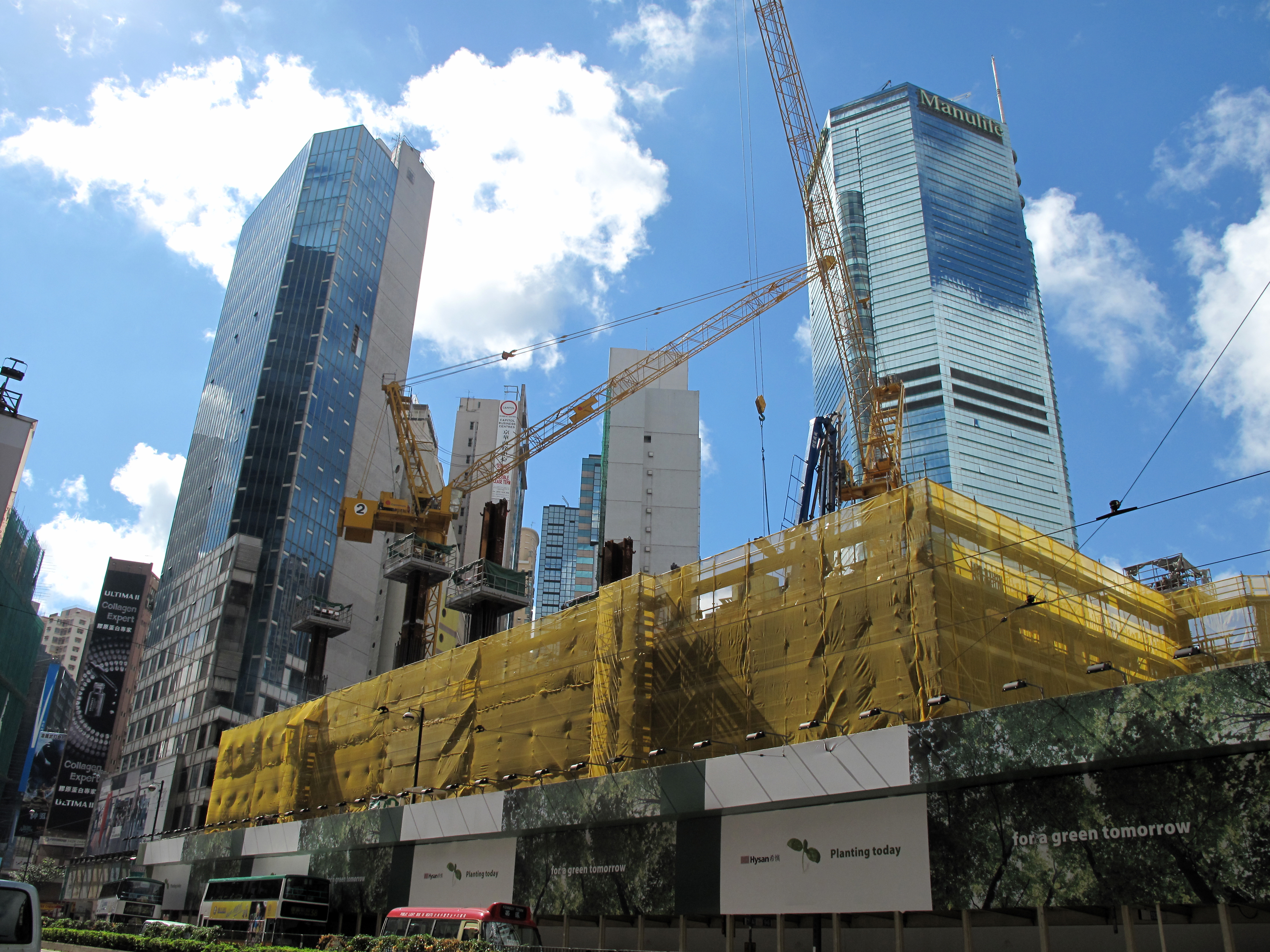
Hysan Place under construction in July 2010

Hysan Place (Chinese: 希慎廣場; Jyutping: hei1 san6 gwong2 coeng4, sometimes 希慎, hei¹ san²*) is a shopping centre and office building at 500 Hennessy Road, Lee Garden, Causeway Bay, Hong Kong. It was developed by Hysan Development Company Limited at the former site of Hennessy Centre and was designed by international architecture firm Kohn Pedersen Fox. The Architect on record and authorized person was DLN Architects. It was opened on 10 August 2012.

== The building ==
Hysan Place is a 40-storey retail/office building. Other facilities include a four-storey car park and retail basement, covering a total gross floor area of approximately 710,000 square feet (66,000 m^{2}) and a site area of around 47,738 square feet (4,435.0 m^{2}). Construction work is carried out by Gammon Construction. The contract value is HK$1.5 billion (US$193 million) and was set to complete in November 2011. Hysan Place is the first Hong Kong building that has achieved pre-certification of the highest Platinum level under Leadership in Energy and Environmental Design (LEED) of the U.S. Green Building Council (USGBC).

Hysan Place comprises a 40-storey mixed-use tower that provides panoramic views. There are 15 levels of office space and some 17 floors of retail outlets, totalling 710,000 square feet. It is connected to the public transport network and is directly linked to the MTR's Causeway Bay station.

== The shopping centre ==
The development includes 42,000m^{2} of retail space spread over 17 levels. The retail interior was designed by Benoy using a monochrome palette and organic geometric architectural lines. Eslite book store is reported to be renting 40,000 sq ft or 3 floors of retail space at Hysan Place.

American fashion brand Hollister California opened its first store in Hong Kong Island in a 20,000 sq ft (1,900 m^{2}) space in the mall, at a monthly rent of over HK$1 million, or HK$50–60 per sq ft.

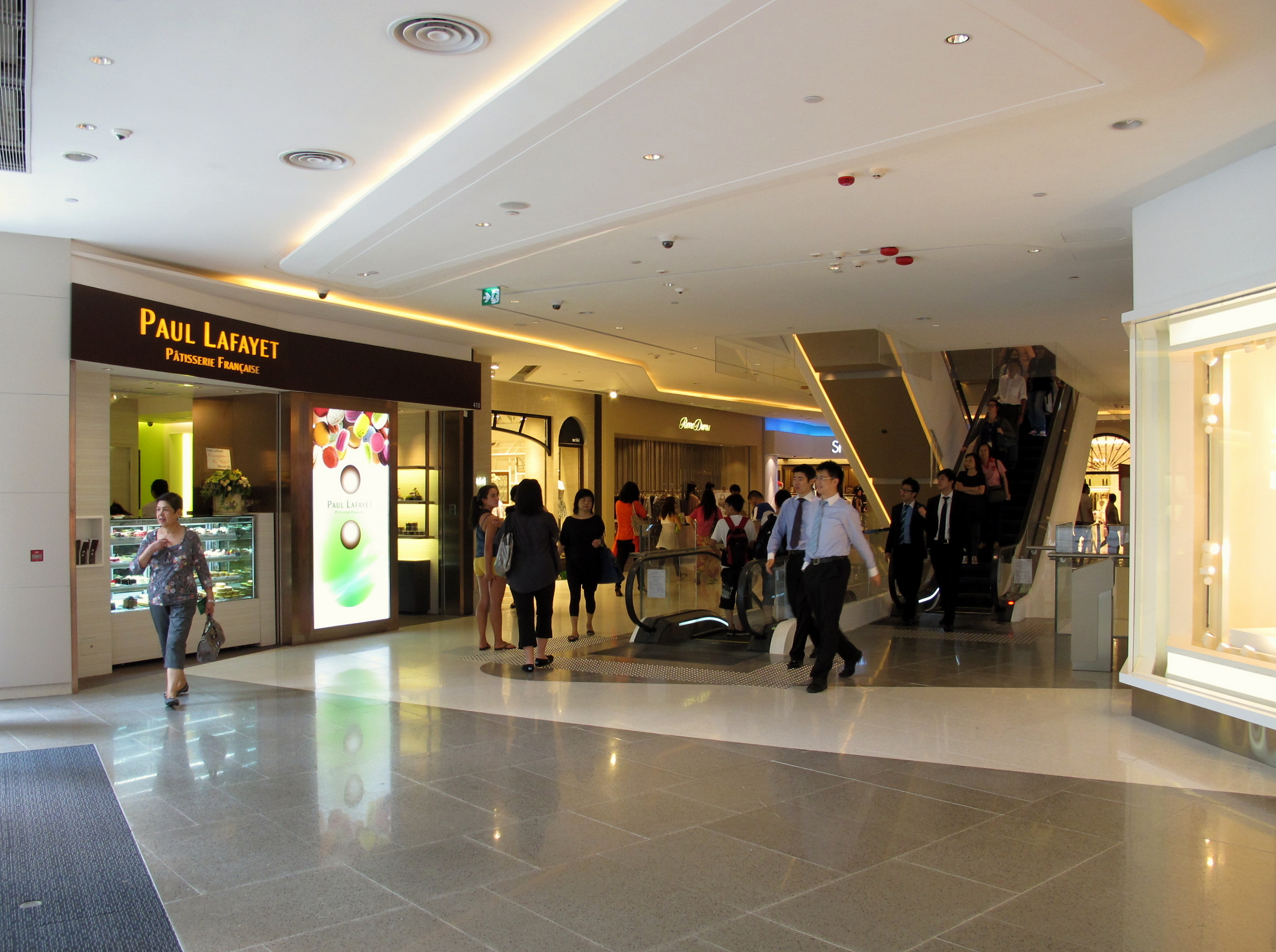
Level 4 Shops

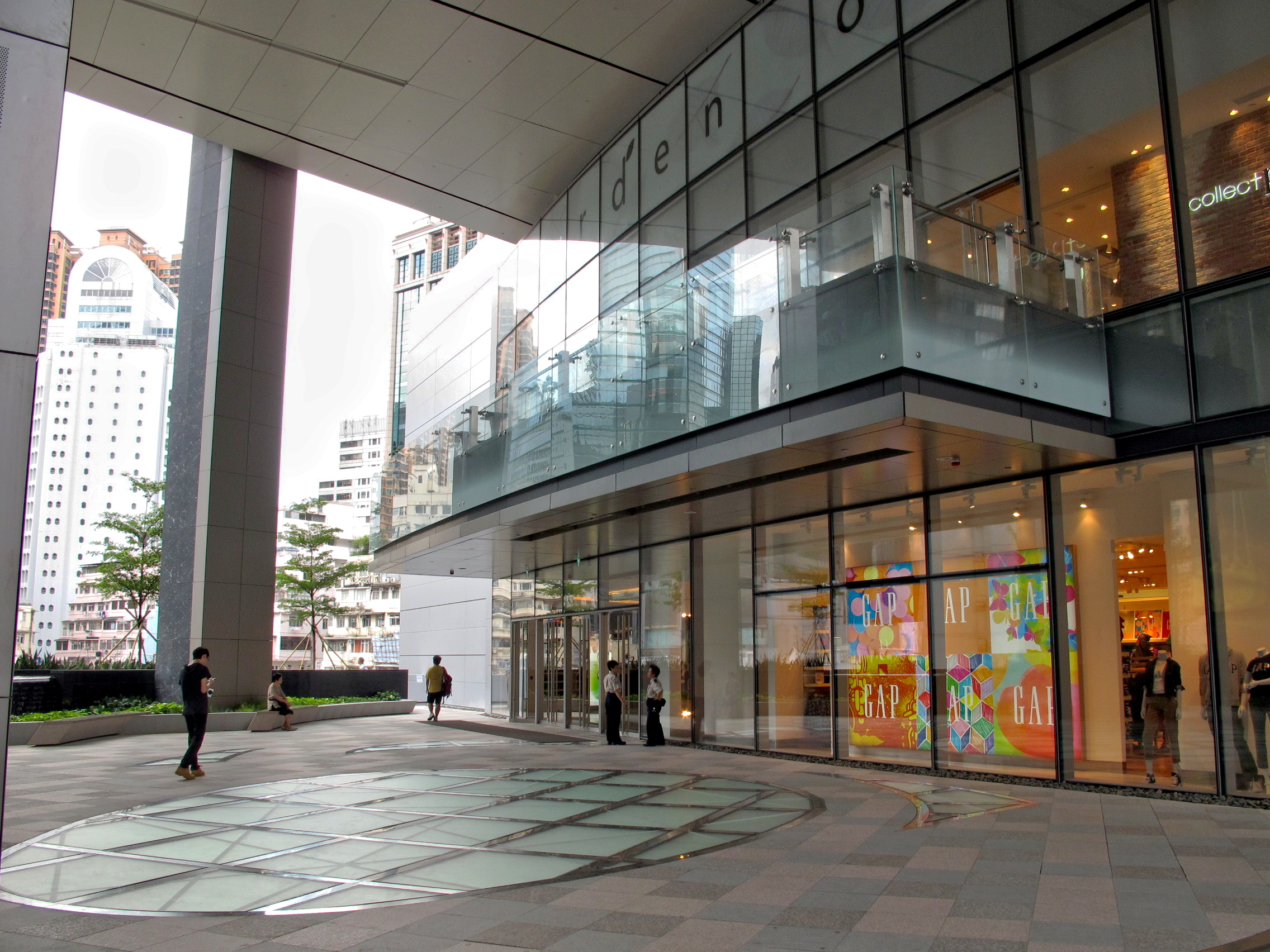
Level 4 Garden

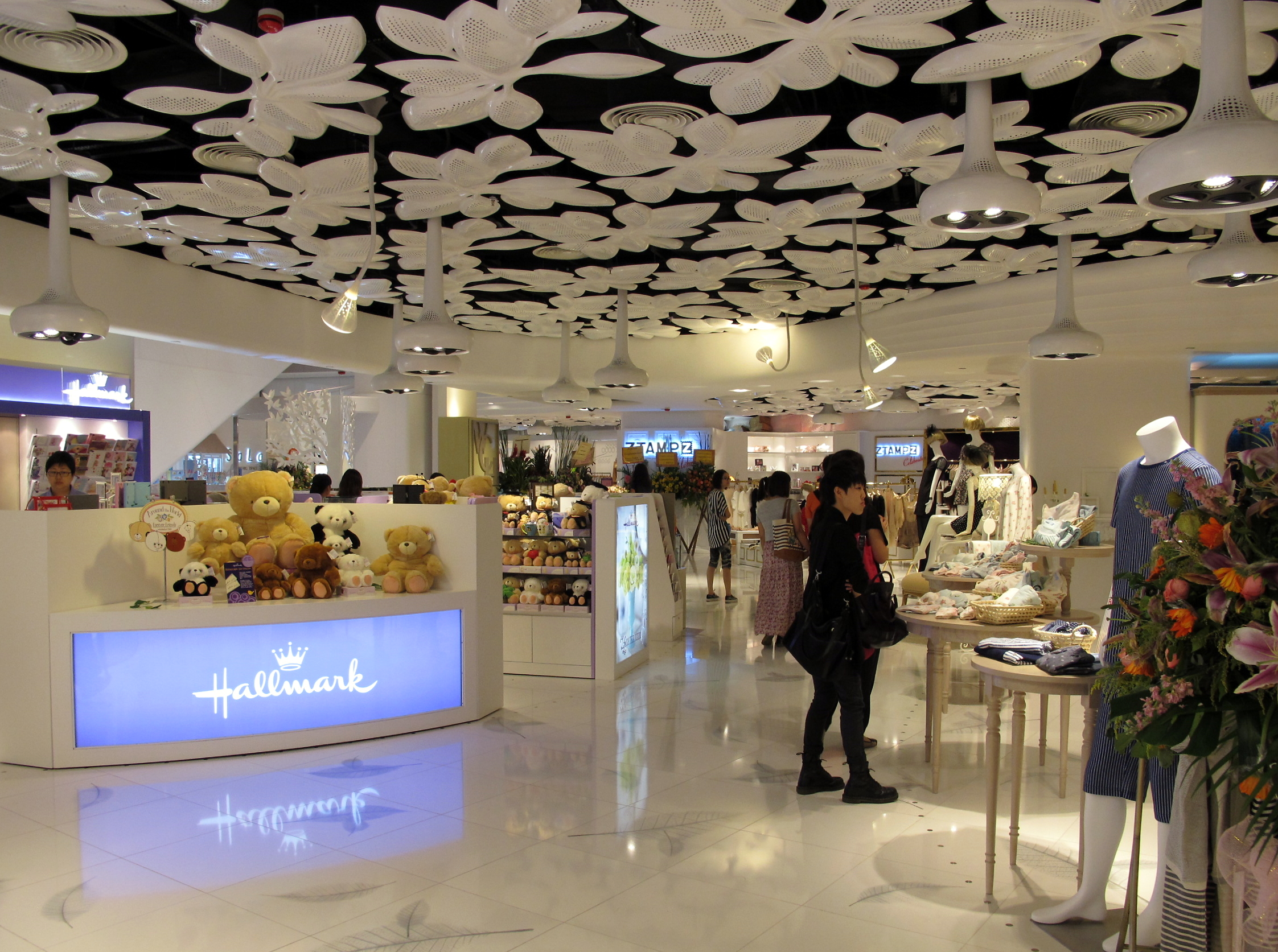
Garden of Eden in Level 6

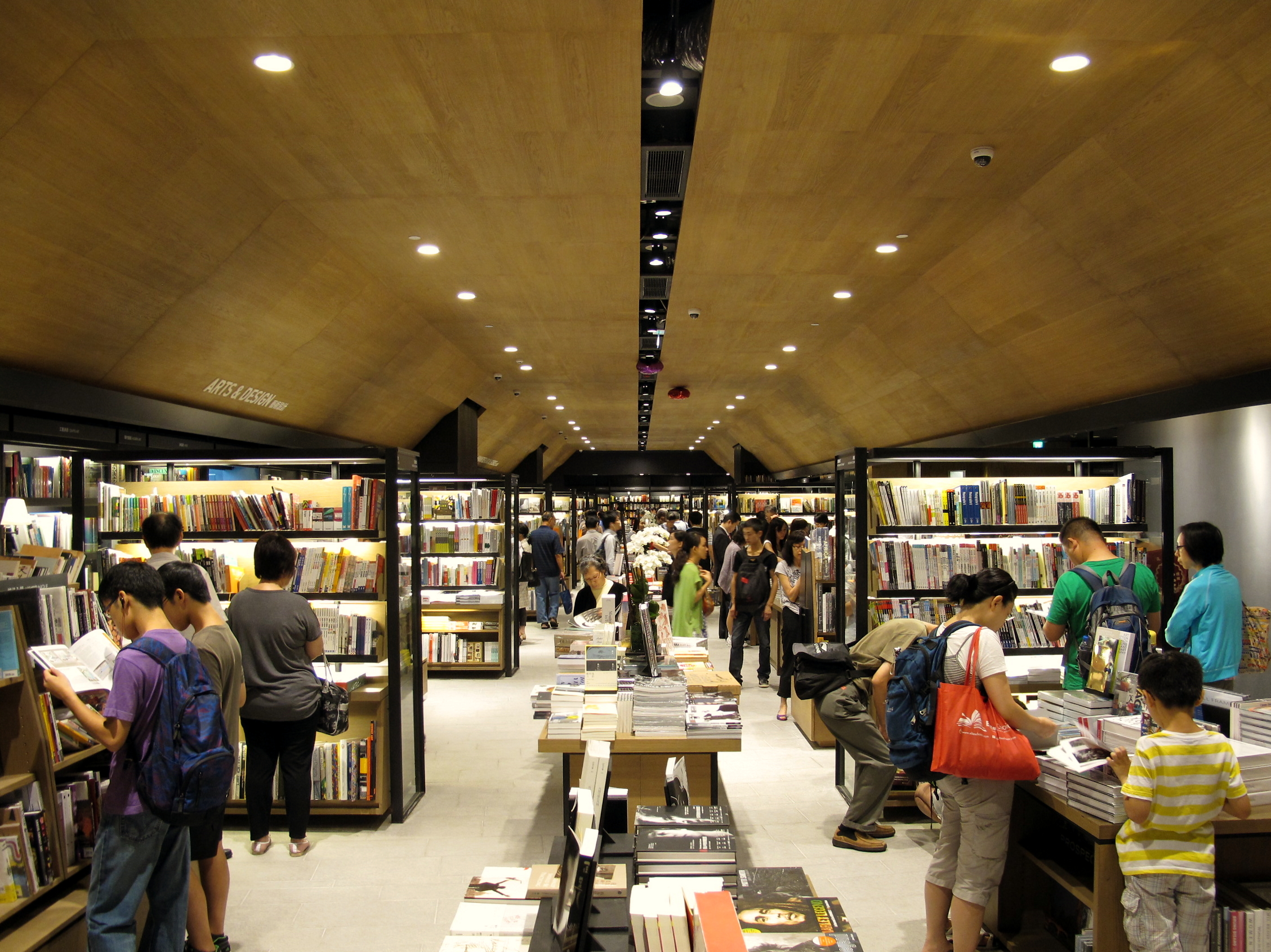
Eslite Bookstore in Level 9

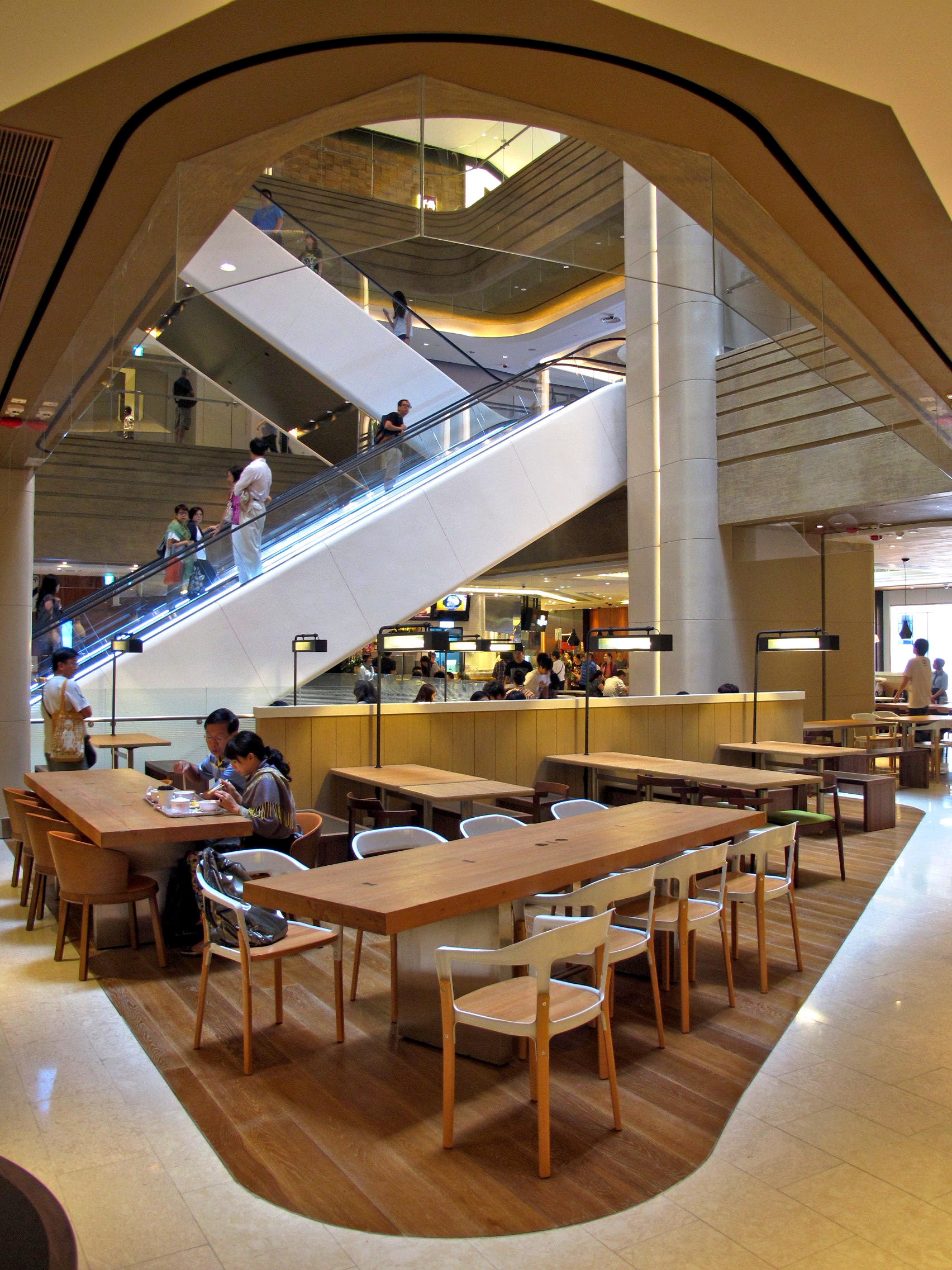
Kitchen Eleven Food Court in Level 11

== Office tenants ==
Hysan Development Company Limited announced the first office tenant for Hysan Place as KPMG, the international accounting firm on 13 June 2011. KPMG has signed a nine-year lease for the 20th to the 25th floors of the building, taking up an area of approximately 80,000 sq. ft.

The office is located on floors 20 to 38. B1 floor and underground with four double-deck lifts to 9 to 10 floor transfer lobby. But the office rents far behind the mall, initially only 40%. Existing tenants include one of the four largest accounting firms KPMG, international leather goods Gucci, McCann Erickson, Akamai and the US Recruitment Social Platform LinkedIn.

There is a small courtyard in the middle of the tallest two-storey office, named "Hysan Farmland", covering an area of about 5,000 square feet to promote a balanced culture of life. A variety of organic vegetables and herbs are planted and plans to organize workshops every year to allow business participants to experience the farming process. And the grass and green walls in the courtyard can relieve the heat island effect.

== Awards and honours ==
- Green Building Award: Building Under Construction, Merit Award
- HKGBC, Gold, Best Mixed-Use Development (2012)
- MIPIM Asia, Global Awards for Excellence (2012)
- Urban Land Institute (2013)
- World Architecture Festival, Shortlist for Best Shopping Center (2013)

== See also ==
- List of shopping centres in Hong Kong
- List of tallest buildings in Hong Kong
