= Hysan Development =

Hong Kong real estate developer

- Company logo (left) and bilingual text of the company name (right)
- Formerly: Hennessy Development
- Type: listed
- Traded as: SEHK: 14
- ISIN: HK0014000126
- Industry: real estate development
- Predecessor: Lee Hysan Estate
- Founded: 20 October 1970; 55 years ago in British Hong Kong
- Founder: Lee Hysan family; (via Lee Hysan Estate)
- Headquarters: 49/F, Lee Garden One, Hong Kong Island, Hong Kong, China
- Key people: Irene Lee (executive chairman)
- Revenue: HK$3.548 billion (2017)
- Net income: ▲HK$3.616 billion (2017)
- Total assets: ▲HK$82.120 billion (2017)
- Total equity: ▲HK$69.953 billion (2017)
- Owner: Lee Hysan Co. Ltd. (41.42%); (via Lee Hysan Estate)

Chinese name
- Traditional Chinese: 希慎興業有限公司
- Simplified Chinese: 希慎兴业有限公司
Transcriptions
Standard Mandarin
- Hanyu Pinyin: Xīshèn Xìngyè Yǒuxiàn Gōngsī
Yue: Cantonese
- Jyutping: hei1 san6 hing1 jip6 jau5 haan6 gung1 si1

short name
- Traditional Chinese: 希慎興業
- Simplified Chinese: 希慎兴业
Transcriptions
Standard Mandarin
- Hanyu Pinyin: Xīshèn Xìngyè
Yue: Cantonese
- Jyutping: hei1 san6 hing1 jip6

second short name
- Traditional Chinese: 希慎
- Simplified Chinese: 希慎
- Literal meaning: Hysan
Transcriptions
Standard Mandarin
- Hanyu Pinyin: Xīshèn
Yue: Cantonese
- Jyutping: hei1 san6
- Rating: BBB+ (Fitch, August 2017)
- Footnotes in consolidated financial statement (net income and equity figures excluding minority interests); source of data

Hysan Development Company Limited is a Hong Kong property investment, management and development company that is listed on the Stock Exchange of Hong Kong. The company was formed in Hong Kong in 1923, when businessman Lee Hysan acquired plots of land in East Point, now known as Causeway Bay, Hong Kong Island. On 30 April 1928, Hysan, who was aged 48–49, was killed. His descendant expanded the plots of land into a business empire. According to the South China Morning Post, Hysan was the largest commercial landlord in the Causeway Bay area in 2018.

== History ==
=== Predecessor ===
The predecessor of the company began when Lee Hysan incorporated Lee Hysan Estate Co., Ltd. (Chinese: 利希慎置業), acquiring the land lease (crown lease) on Jardine's Hill, Hong Kong Island, in 1923 and other land leases around nearby East Point; which is now known as Causeway Bay.

Before his death in 1928, Lee had distributed most of the shares of Lee Hysan Estate to his wife, concubines, children and relatives in 1925. The shares he retained, 1/5 of the share capital, was inherited by his wife.

East Point in colonial times contained mostly residential areas, with some offices dedicated to a British trading company. The development of the Jardine's Hill property into an entertainment ground—the modern day Lee Garden—and the following construction of the Lee Theatre as a Chinese opera venue set the trend for the continual redevelopment of Causeway Bay.

=== Hysan Development ===
Hysan Development was incorporated on 20 October 1970 as Hennessy Development Company Limited (unofficial translation appeared in Chinese media as 軒尼詩興業有限公司 or 興利建設有限公司) It was said to acquire a land lease (leasehold of Crown land) from the parent company Lee Hysan Estate in 1971 to re-develop into Hennessy Centre (Chinese: 興利中心) in Hennessy Road (Chinese: 軒尼詩道), which was demolished in 2010s for another re-development. In 1973, the company became an unlisted public limited company, selling 25% of its shares to the general public. Tai Cheung Holdings was a minority shareholder of Hysan Development. The company was listed on the Stock Exchange of Hong Kong (Chinese: 香港聯合交易所; lit. 'Hong Kong united exchange') in September 1981. The Chinese-language media also reported another unofficial translation of the company name Hysan Development, as 希慎發展有限公司.

It was said the company acquired three more sister companies from its parent company; these were Leighton (Chinese: 禮頓發展), Sunning (Chinese: 新寧地產) and Avenue respectively in the 1970s. The company also owned a subsidiary called "Kwong Wan". Hysan Development and the four subsidiaries owned five building complexes at that time, namely Hennessy Centre, Leighton Centre, One Hysan Avenue, Sunning Court and Sunning Plaza.

After it became a listed company, Hysan Development acquired more land leases from the family members of Lee Hysan and from the family-owned company Lee Hysan Estate in 1980s to 1990s for re-development. These included a land lease on 74–86 Kennedy Road, now known as Bamboo Grove and the re-development of Lee Theatre and Lee Gardens Hotel into Lee Theatre Plaza and Lee Garden One respectively. It was reported that 74–86 Kennedy Road was the former location of the Lee family mansion, for which a building plan for another potential re-development was approved in 2017.

The company also acquired some properties in Yun Ping Road and re-developed it into Lee Garden Two (called Caroline Centre at that time) in the early 1990s.

In 1987, the company agreed to acquire 5% shares of the soon-to-be-listed HKR International. At the same time, the company issued 393.7 million new shares for HK$1.25 each, equal to 10% of the total share capital, to the Lee family. The Lee family sold the same number of shares to third parties. The event occurred right before the Black Monday crash in the same year.

In 1988, a scandal regarding the listing of those new shares of Hysan and other listed companies not connected to Hysan was exposed. It was alleged that a securities brokerage firm had bribed Ronald Li, chairman of the exchange, as an incentive for approval. Both the Lee and Li families were considered two of the four big families of the colonial era, which were the social elites that formed a network of collaboration.

In 1991, Hysan Development announced they were negotiating to sell their residential portfolio Garden Terrace in the Mid-Levels. At the same time, they also developed Tanner Garden in North Point as a for-sale portfolio, as well as owning 5% shares of Hong Kong flag carrier Cathay Pacific Airways as an investment. According to another columnist, Hysan Development owned 30% stake in the Tanner Garden project.

Hysan Place was one of Hysan Developments' re-development projects of the 2010s; the site was formerly known as Hennessy Centre. It was opened in 2012 and comprises 15 levels of office space and 17 floors of retail outlets, totalling 710,000 square feet (66,000 m^{2}). Hysan Place achieved pre-certification at the Platinum level for the United States Green Building Council's Leadership in Energy and Environmental Design (USGBC LEED), and the Hong Kong Building Environmental Assessment Method (HK BEAM) standard.

Another re-development, Lee Garden Three, was completed in 2017. The re-development also caused a minor controversy; Sunning Plaza, which was set to be demolished in 2013 to make way for Lee Garden Three, was designed by architect I. M. Pei and was considered an oasis in the business district by some citizens. It was only used for 31 years.

In 2016, Hysan partnered with HKR International to form a joint venture called Strongbod Limited, which won a tender to buy two neighbouring residential land leases in Tai Po from the government. Named Villa Lucca.

== Share listing ==
Hysan Development shares are listed on the Stock Exchange of Hong Kong. Its shares are also traded through over-the-counter facilities in London. In addition, Hysan Development has a sponsored listing of their American Depositary Receipts (ADR) in the OTC Markets Group.

== Portfolio ==
As of 31 December 2017,Hysan Development's principal portfolio consists of a 10 building complexes. Except Lee Garden Two, which Hysan owned 65.36%, they are wholly owned by the company as leasing floor area:

1. Lee Garden One (commercial) (also known as Manulife Plaza)
2. Bamboo Grove (residential)
3. Villa Lucca (residential) (Joint venture with HKR International)
4. Lee Garden Two (commercial) (also known as Caroline Centre)
5. Leighton Centre (commercial)
6. Lee Theatre Plaza (commercial)
7. Lee Garden Three (commercial)
8. One Hysan Avenue (commercial)
9. Lee Garden Five (commercial) (also known as 18 Hysan Avenue)
10. Lee Garden Six (commercial) (also known as 111 Leighton Road)
11. Hysan Place (commercial) (located on 500 Hennessy Road.

Hysan Place opened in 2012 and was the site of Hennessy Centre and Mitsukoshi department store

Six of the complexes were partially or entirely on a land-lease called Inland Lot No.29, despite being broken into several sub-leases. According to other companies, Inland Lot No.29, a former crown lease, was commenced from 25 June 1860 in a term of 982 years—999 years from 1842, the establishment of the colony. According to a columnist, if those 999-year land leases were not revised, they had a very low government rent payable to the government in the modern-day standard.

Hysan Developments is known for suing the Hong Kong government in civil court. Despite the height of the building structure above sea level, which was not restricted by the terms in the land lease but by plot ratio, the Town Planning Board introduced new height restrictions in their draft Outline Zoning Plans (OZPs) of the Wan Chai and Causeway Bay areas, causing a potential decrease in re-development values of the area. This policy was officially mentioned in 2009–10 Policy Agenda of the government as "beautifying the coasts of the Victoria Harbour" and "continuing to stipulate in all outline zoning plans clear development restrictions on plot ratio/gross floor area, site coverage and/or building height where justified to improve the living environment" respectively. Public consultations on height restriction was started in 2000. Those policies were interpreted as the continuation of the policy to protect the ridge line of Hong Kong Island from high-rise buildings.

Hysan sued the government, quoting clause in the Hong Kong Basic Law on protecting private property rights as rationale, and after losing the case in the High Court, the company appealed the result at the Court of Final Appeal, which referred the case back to the Town Planning Board in 2016. Eventually, the draft OZP was revised again, announced in January 2018, approved in September 2018; the media concluded the revisions would benefit Hysan and other developers that own properties in that area.

The former Hysan properties Sunning Plaza (Chinese: 新寧大廈; pinyin: Xīn níng dà shà; Jyutping: san1 ning4 daai6 haa6) and Sunning Court were demolished for Lee Garden Three. The site in Tai Po was under construction.

== Shareholders ==
Hysan Development was incorporated in 1970, while its predecessor and the largest direct shareholder, Hysan Estates Limited—formerly known as Lee Hysan Estate Company Limited—was incorporated in 1923. As of December 2017, Hysan Estates was entirely owned by Lee Hysan Company Limited. According to company filing and activist David Webb, the latter was a Jersey-incorporated company. Lee Hysan Company Limited is believed to be controlled by members of Lee Hysan family.

Despite being a family business, as of 1981, the company also had non-Lee directors such as Kwok Tak-seng of Sun Hung Kai Properties, Geoffrey Yeh of Hsin Chong, Chan Pun of Tai Cheung Holdings and Hu Fa-kuang on the board. One of the sons of Lee Hysan and one of the director of Lee Hysan Estate, Harold H.W. Lee, died in 1980. Former chief secretary of the colonial Hong Kong government David Akers-Jones also served as an independent director of the company after he left the government in late 1980s. Akers-Jones later became an independent non-executive chairman of Hysan until he was replaced by Irene Lee in 2011.

As of December 2017, out of nine directors of the board, four were independent non-executive directors, for example Lawrence Lau. While members of Lee family took four of the remaining seats, the last seat was occupied by Hans Michael Jebsen, who is also a business partner of the company in Lee Garden Two, which is incorporated as Barrowgate Limited, as a minority shareholder.

Three of the four directors from Lee families were also the directors of Hysan Estates and Lee Hysan Co. Ltd. The executive chairman Irene Lee, who is not a director of the parent companies, is the sister of Anthony Lee, another director. They also served as non-executive directors on other companies in which the Lee family and Hysan Development had invested, such as Cathay Pacific Airways (Irene Lee as independent director) and TVB (Anthony Lee). While Lee Chien had served as a director of Swire Pacific, Swire Pacific and Cathay Pacific Airways were part of the Hong Kong real estate conglomerate Swire Group.
