= Lee Hysan =

Hong Kong businessman

- Born: 1879; Kingdom of Hawaii
- Died: 30 April 1928 (aged 48–49); British Hong Kong
- Cause of death: Assassination
- Other name: Opium King
- Children: Richard Charles Lee; Harold Hsiao-Wo Lee; Jung Kong Lee; Shun Yin Lee; Wing Tat Lee
- Father: Lee Leung Yik (利良奕)
Relatives
Vivienne Poy	(granddaughter)
Neville Poy	(grandson-in-law)
Christina Lee Look Ngan-kwan	(daughter-in-law)
Lee Quo-wei	(nephew)

Chinese name
- Chinese: 利希慎
Transcriptions
Standard Mandarin
- Hanyu Pinyin: Lì Xīshèn
Yue: Cantonese
- Jyutping: lei6 hei1 san6

Lee Hysan or Lee Hy-san (1879 – 30 April 1928) was a Hong Kong businessman who was involved in the opium trade and refinery, as well as land development in British Hong Kong during the early 1900s. He was nicknamed the Opium King in Hong Kong and Macau.

== Early life ==
Lee was born in Hawaii. Lee's father was Lee Leung-yik (Chinese: 利良奕), a businessman who was heavily involved in the opium business in Hong Kong and China. Lee's ancestral home was in Kaiping, Jiangmen, Guangdong, China and Lee Leung-yik immigrated and moved his family to the US during the California Gold Rush at age 49 when immigration from Qing-era China was illegal. After making a small fortune, the family left San Francisco in 1896 and eventually relocated to Xinhui, Guangdong province and then to Hong Kong.

At age seventeen, after arriving in Hong Kong, Lee Hysan continued his studies at Queen's College. Since he spoke English fluently, he later taught English at Queen's College, his alma mater.

== Career ==
Lee's father achieved great wealth from the opium trade, and Lee inherited his father's business. Having amassed a great fortune from his successful opium business, Lee later participated in the fast-growing Hong Kong real estate market.

In 1923, he bought the Jardine's Hill property, west of Causeway Bay, from Jardines for HK$3.8 million. He initially wanted to build opium refinery facilities there, but owing to the global anti-opium movement, he changed his plan and developed the property as Lee Garden. It is approximately the area around Lee Garden Road, Lee Theatre, Yun Ping Road and Percival Street.

== Children ==
In March 1905, Lee's son Richard Charles Lee was born in Hong Kong, as a result of his first marriage. In November 1923, Jung Kong Lee was also born in Hong Kong, from his second marriage.

== Death and legacy ==
On 30 April 1928, Lee was shot on a street in the Central district in Hong Kong and died shortly after yelling for help. The assassination was possibly due to a growing public resentment of his opium business, which people believed had caused great harm to Chinese society. The assassin was never caught, despite his family offering a huge bounty. When the news of his murder reached Macau, many people went into celebrations with a prolonged bursting of firecrackers.

At the time of his death, his estate was valued at HK$4.4 million. The present-day Hysan Development Company has a market capitalisation in excess of HK$20 billion.

=== Landmarks named after him ===
- Lee Garden
  - Lee Garden One
  - Lee Garden Two
  - Lee Garden Three
  - Lee Garden Five
  - Lee Garden Six
  - Lee Garden Seven
- Hysan Avenue
- Hysan Place
- Lee Hysan Hall in the University of Hong Kong
- Lee Hysan Medical Library in the University of Hong Kong, renamed as Yu Chun Keung Medical Library after moving
- Lee Hysan Concert Hall in Chinese University of Hong Kong

== Doggerel ==
There was a popular doggerel in Hong Kong showing Lee's notoriety. The first characters of the first three lines sound (in Cantonese) almost the same as Lee's name:

利己害人 lei^{6} gei^{2} hoi^{6} jan^{4}
欺貧重富 hei^{1} pan^{4} zung^{6} fu^{3}
神憎鬼厭 san^{4} zang^{1} gwai^{2} jim^{3}
街知巷聞 gaai^{1} zi^{1} hong^{6} man^{4}

Literal translation:

Benefiting oneself while harming others,
Oppressing the poor while respecting the rich.
Detested by the deities and disgusted by the ghosts,
Known on the streets and heard on the alleys.

== Notable relatives ==
Many of Lee's descendants and other family members are notable in their own right:

- Richard Charles Lee (利銘澤) (1905–1983) - businessman, son of Lee Hysan
- Vivienne Poy née Lee (利德蕙) - daughter of Richard Charles Lee and a Canadian Senator from 1998 to 2012
- Harold Hsiao-Wo Lee (利孝和)
- Jung Kong Lee (利榮康) - chemist, son of Lee Hysan
- Lee Quo-wei (利國偉) - banker and educator, nephew of Lee Hysan
- Peter Ting Chang Lee, JP (deceased) - former Chairman of Hysan Development
- Michael Tze Hau Lee, BA, MBA - Managing Director, Hysan Development Company Limited
- Anthony Hsien Pin Lee, BA, MBA - non-managing director, Hysan Development Company Limited
- Chien Lee - non-executive director, Hysan Development Company Limited
- Dr. Deanna Ruth Tak Yung Rudgard, BA, MD - non-executive director, Hysan Development Company Limited
