= Jung Kong Lee =

Hong Kong-born American chemist and politician

- 利榮康
- Born: 1923; British Hong Kong
- Died: 31 January 1990 (aged 66–67); Kansas City, Missouri, U.S.
- Education: Lingnan College; Princeton University; Massachusetts Institute of Technology

Jung Kong Lee (Chinese: 利榮康; December 1923 – 31 January 1990) was a Hong Kong-born American-educated chemist and politician. He was member of the Hysan Lee family and a chemist at the University of Kansas. He was also a member of the Hong Kong Basic Law Consultative Committee.

== Biography ==
Lee was born in 1923 into the prominent Lee family. His father, Hysan Lee, was a multi-millionaire who was nicknamed the "King of Opium". He served in the National Revolutionary Army during the Second World War, in which he was an interpreter for General Joe Stillwell's army in the China Burma India Theater. He attended Lingnan College before he moved to the United States, where he attended Princeton University, majoring in chemistry and attaining membership in Sigma Xi. He was also a member of the Campus Club. In 1955, he received a doctoral degree in chemistry and took up a post-doctoral study at the Massachusetts Institute of Technology, before he joined the chemistry department at the University of Kansas.

He returned to Hong Kong in 1980 to take up the directorship of his family business Lee Hysan Estate Co. and then the Hysan Development Co. In 1985, he was appointed member of the Hong Kong Basic Law Consultative Committee for drafting the Basic Law of Hong Kong, the mini-constitution for post-1997 Hong Kong, in which he was part of the Group of 89 a conservative faction consisting of businessmen and professionals. In 1989, he became the founding chairman of the New Hong Kong Alliance which emerged from the Group of 89.

== Personal ==
He was married to a woman named Ingrid and they had a son named Oliver.

On 31 January 1990, Lee died in Kansas City, Missouri, United States after a lengthy illness. He was 66. He was survived by his wife, son, his mother, Mrs. Hysan Lee; three brothers and five sisters.
