= Great George Street, Hong Kong =

Street in Causeway Bay, Hong Kong

Coordinates: 22.28051°N 114.18553°E

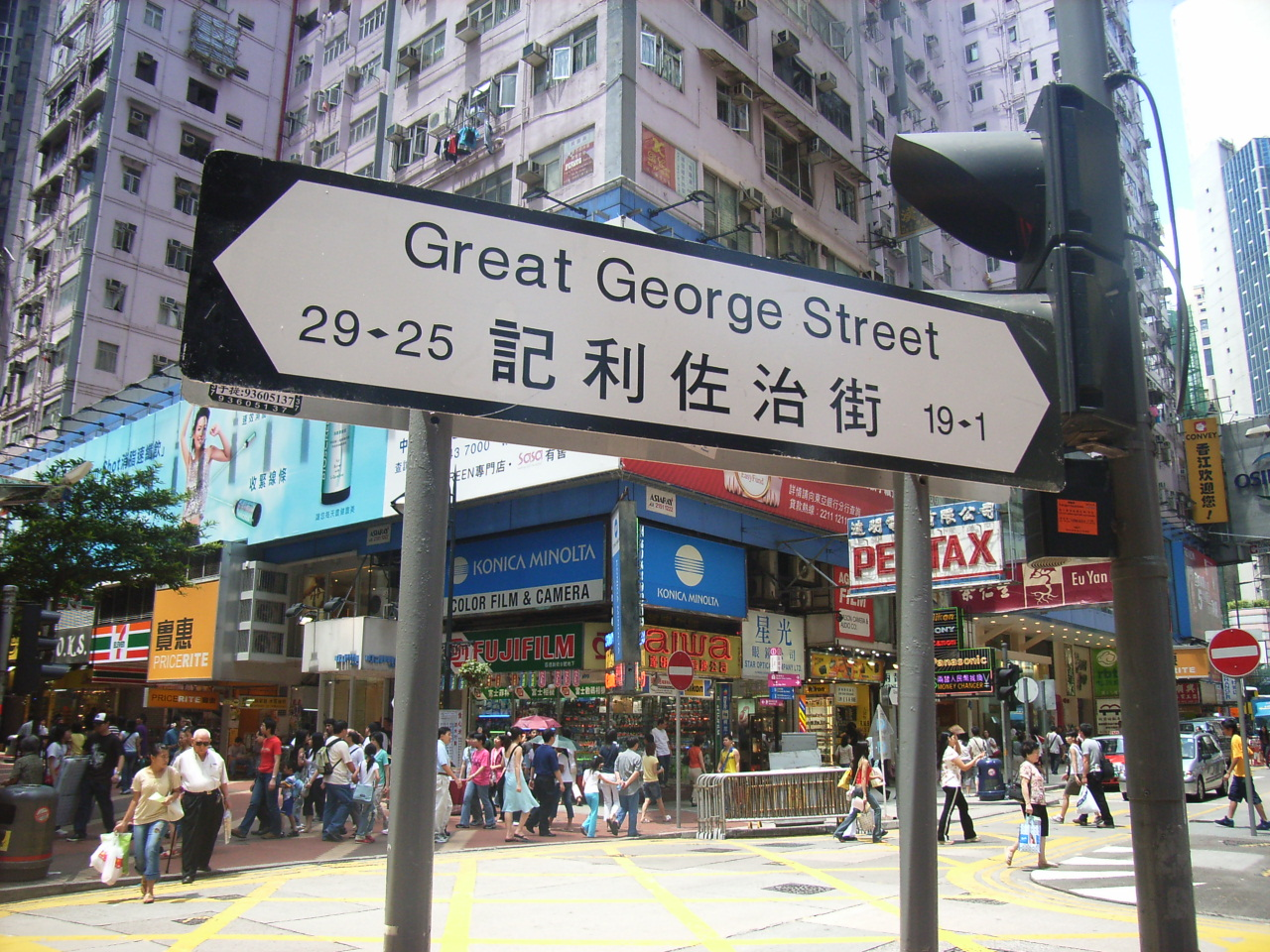
Intersection with Paterson Street

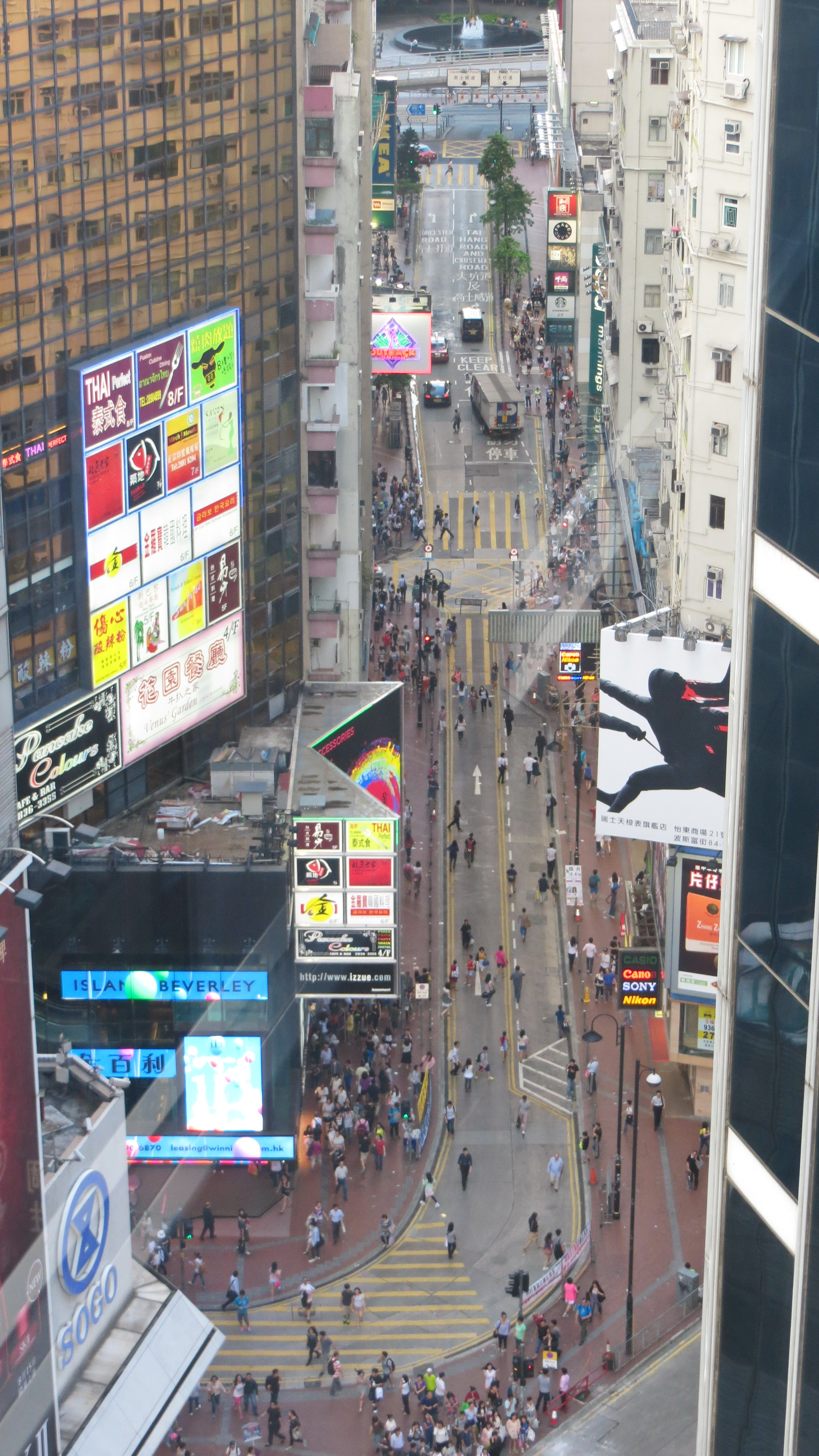
Great George Street

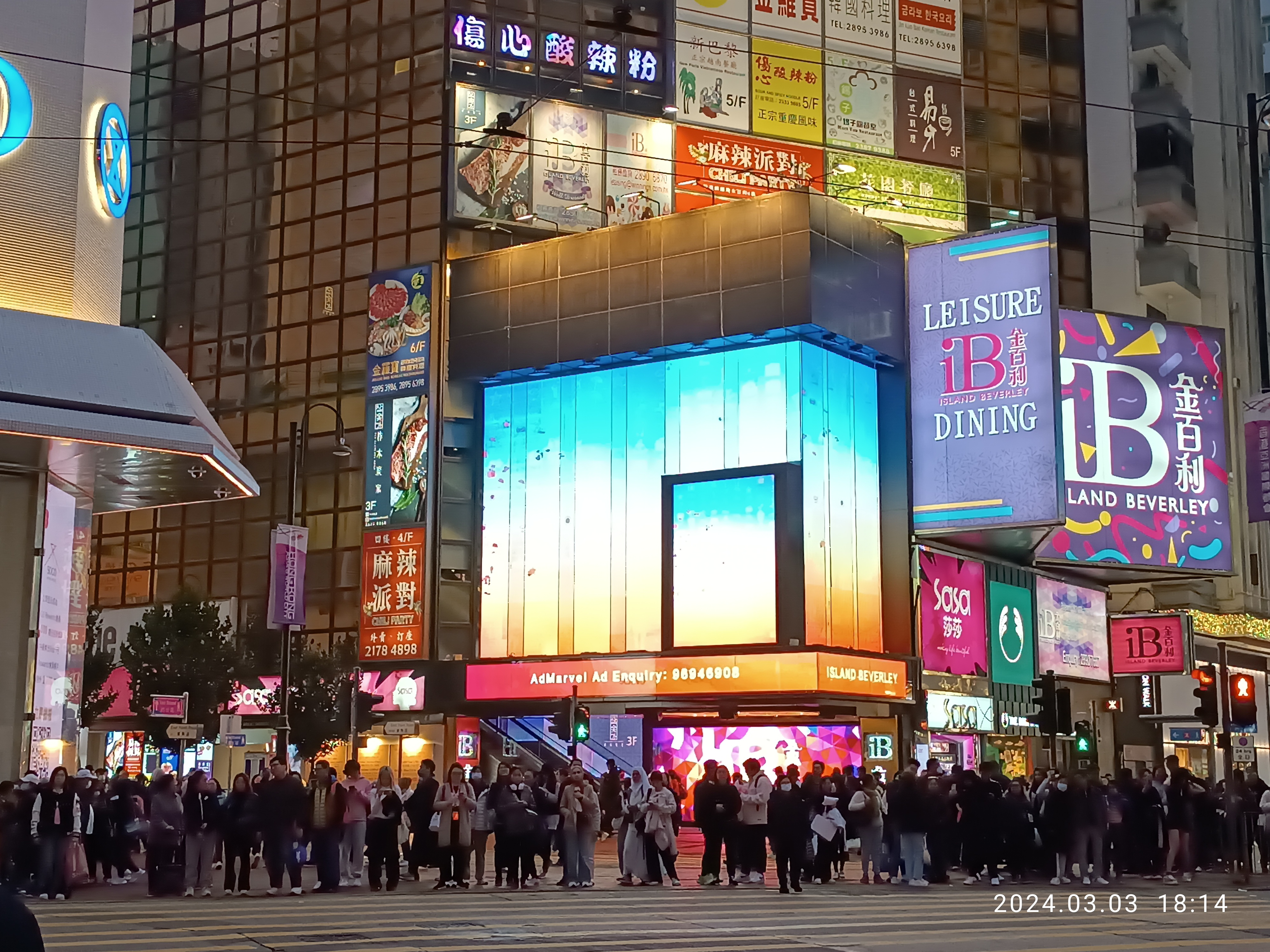
Large junction where Great George Street begins

Windsor House, the main shopping mall on Great George Street

Great George Street (Chinese: 記利佐治街; Jyutping: gei3 lei6 zo3 zi6 gaai1) is a street in the busiest shopping area of Causeway Bay on Hong Kong Island in Hong Kong. It was in the area formerly known as East Point. Starting west at the great junction with East Point Road, Hennessy Road, Yee Wo Street, and also further junction with Jardine's Bazaar and Jardine's Crescent, the street runs east to the junction with Gloucester Road, leading from Exit E of MTR Causeway Bay Station to Victoria Park, crossing Paterson Street in the middle, forming a busy shopping street crowding with people in weekends and holidays, especially when events are held in Victoria Park. To alleviate the crowded situation, the street became pedestrian-orientated, either by converting to part-time pedestrian street or exercising traffic calming measure.

Major buildings in the area include Sogo Causeway Bay, a Japanese-style department store, Island Beverley, a shopping centre, Hong Kong Mansion, a residential/commercial building with a shopping centre, Great George Building, once hosting Daimaru department store and now a shopping mall Fashion Walk, Pearl City Mansion, with a cinema MCL JP and supermarkets Wellcome and Don Don Donki, Parklane Hotel, with an IKEA store, Hang Lung Centre, a shopping centre, and Windsor House, a large multi-storey shopping mall with Grand Windsor Cinema.

== Name ==
The street possibly got its name from a street with the same name, Great George Street, in Westminster of London. In 1750, this London street was built to connect Westminster Bridge and the west by demolishing buildings and streets in George Yard, which named after George Inn. Another source also attributed to the King George II of Great Britain, who reigned between 1683 and 1760. A side street, Little George Street, was built on the site of George Yard at the same time.

The Cantonese name 記利佐治街 (gei3 lei6 zo3 zi6 gaai1), does not mean anything that 記利佐治 (gei3 lei6 zo3 zi6), is a phonetic transcription of English "Great George", /ɡreɪt dʒɔːdʒ/, in Cantonese and 街 (gaai1), simply means street.

== History ==
The street was built on the reclamation of Causeway Bay, east of headland of East Point, where the landlord was Jardine, Matheson & Company. The street was shown in the Plan of Victoria, Hong Kong,1866. The north of it became mint and later sugar refinery, and south ice works. Great George Street as street name appeared in the Plan of the City of Victoria, Hong Kong, 1889. The place remained port and industrial use until 1960s. By this period, the street gradually converted to mixed use of residential and commercial.

The triangular area, where Hong Kong Mansion situating, between Great George Street, Yee Wo Street and Paterson's Street was once known as East Point Terrace, a residential block. It first occupied by the staff work in China Sugar Refinery, recorded in the Sessional Papers for the Year 1922. In 1947, the government bought the terrace for accommodation of police inspectors, later was known as East Point Terrace Police Quarters. The land was finally sold and rebuilt as Hong Kong Mansion in 1966.

== Light pollution ==
In October 2008, an environmental organisation, Friends of the Earth, Hong Kong, released a result of online election about the "light pollution" emitted from the commercial building, Windsor House, in this street. They found the intensity of the light is 10,000 lux, equivalent to the brightness of daylight.
