= Great George =

Great George may refer to:

- England's ninth-largest bell, hung in the Wills Memorial Building, University of Bristol
- A badge of the Order of the Garter
- Great George (Liverpool ward), defunct ward in Merseyside, Liverpool

== See also ==
- Great George Street, Hong Kong
- Great George Street, Westminster, London
