= Causeway Bay station =

MTR station on Hong Kong Island

Causeway Bay 銅鑼灣
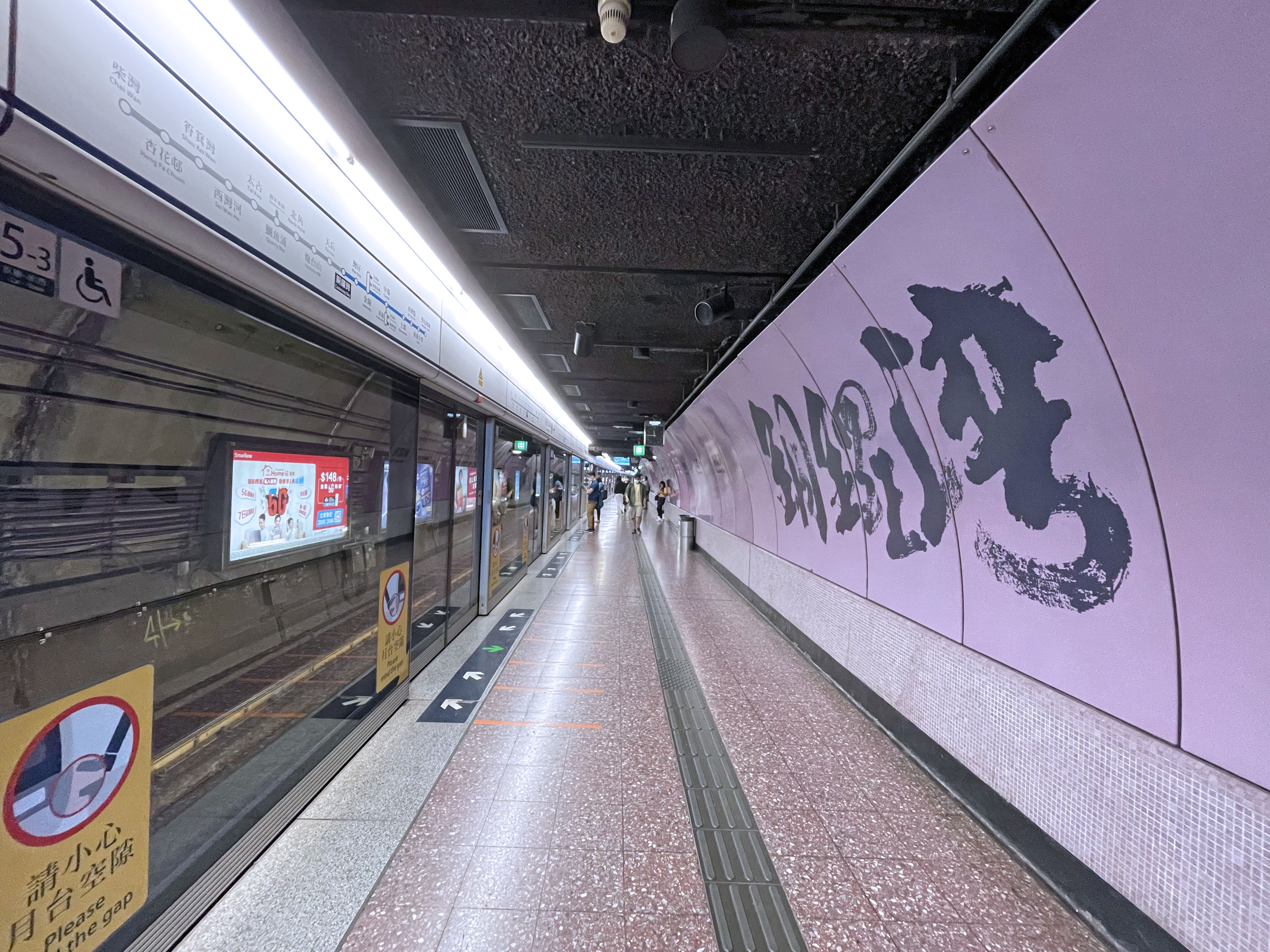
- Platform 2 (2021)

Chinese name
- Traditional Chinese: 銅鑼灣
- Simplified Chinese: 铜锣湾
- Hanyu Pinyin: Tóngluówān
- Cantonese Yale: Tùnglòwāan
- Literal meaning: Copper gong bay
Transcriptions
Standard Mandarin
- Hanyu Pinyin: Tóngluówān
Yue: Cantonese
- Yale Romanization: Tùnglòwāan
- IPA: [tʰʊ̏ŋ lɔ̏ː wáːn]
- Jyutping: Tung4lo4waan1

General information
- Location: Hennessy Road × Yee Wo Street, East Point; Wan Chai District, Hong Kong
- Coordinates: 22°16′49″N 114°11′01″E
- System: MTR rapid transit station
- Owner: MTR Corporation
- Operator: MTR Corporation
- Line: Island line
- Platforms: 2 (2 split level side platforms)
- Tracks: 2
- Connections: Tram; Bus, minibus

Construction
- Structure type: Underground
- Depth: 30 m (98 ft)
- Platform levels: 2
- Accessible: Yes

Other information
- Station code: CAB

History
- Opened: 31 May 1985; 41 years ago
- Former names: East Point

Services
Preceding station	MTR	Following station
Wan Chai towards Kennedy Town	Island line	Tin Hau towards Chai Wan
Track layout
Location
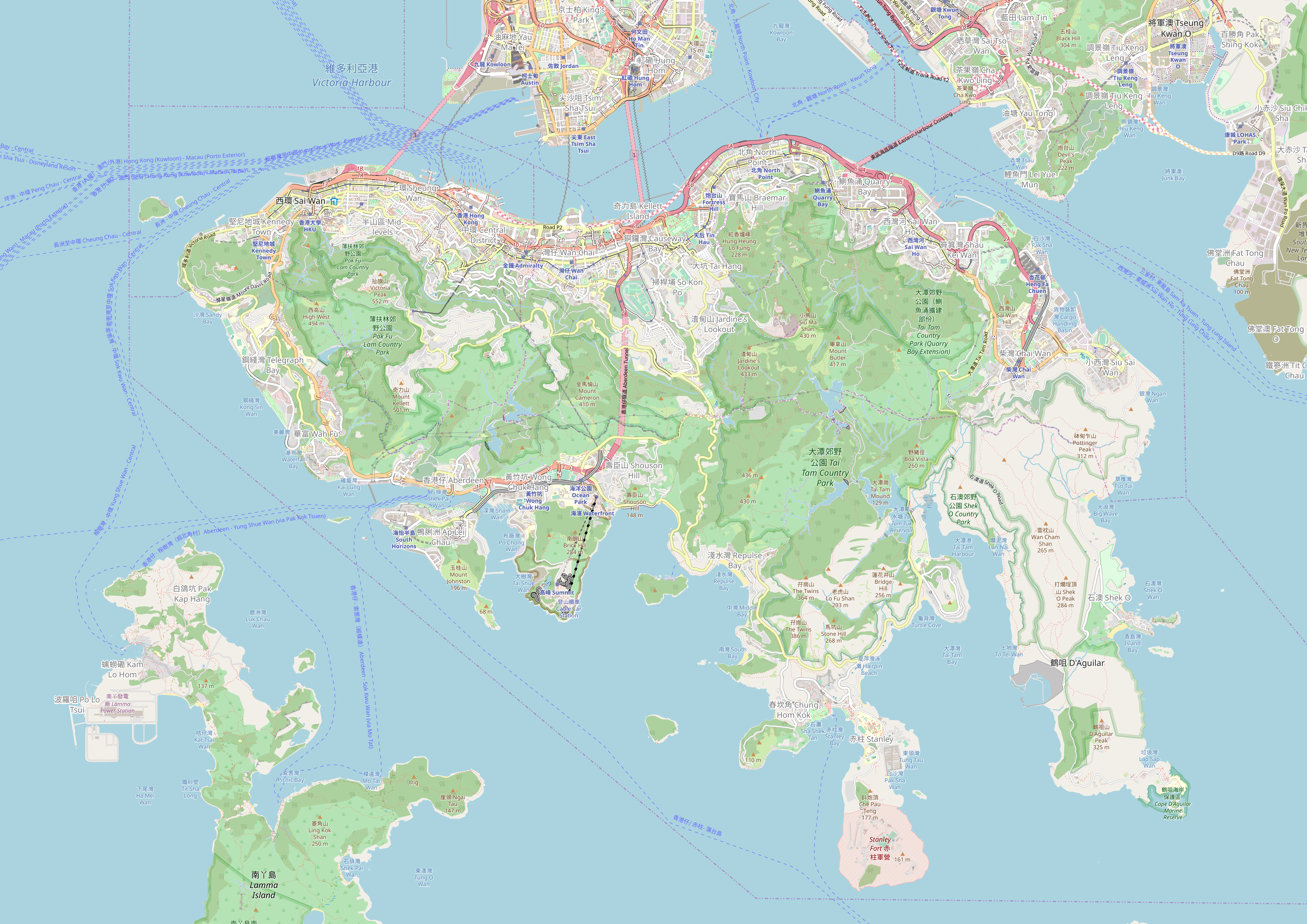
- Location within MTR Location within Hong Kong urban core Location within Hong Kong Island

Causeway Bay (Chinese: 銅鑼灣; Cantonese Yale: Tùnglòwāan) is an underground metro station on the MTR network in Hong Kong. It is located between Wan Chai and Tin Hau stations on the Island line, and sits underneath Great George Street near Hennessy Road and Yee Wo Street. Named for the Causeway Bay area and its abundant shopping centres, the station serves various malls including Hysan Place, Sino Plaza, Sogo, and the nearby Victoria Park.

A line servicing Hong Kong Island had been part of the initial 1967 plans for a metro system in the city. The Island line would be approved in 1980 while construction began two years later. In 1985 the station opened along with the first section of the line, which would be extended westward toward Kennedy Town in 2014. The station consists of two separate concourses situated atop two platforms stacked vertically due to geographical constraints and has 6 exits.

== History ==
=== Planning ===
In 1967, the government of Hong Kong saw the need for a public transport system. British transport consultants Freeman, Fox, Wilbur Smith & Associates were commissioned to write the Mass Transport Study, which proposed a new underground railway. The plan included the Island line between Kennedy Town and Chai Wan stations, as well as the Kwun Tong line, Tsuen Wan line, and the Shatin line. Three lines would become part of the early stages of the MTR, while the Shatin line would eventually be shelved and never built. Concerns that the Island line would be prohibitively expensive at a time where the MTR was not profitable led the public to believe the government favoured light rail; however, the Transport Advisory Committee—then the agency responsible for public transportation planning—confirmed that fears of surface construction disrupting the main artery of the island would mean the underground metro was ultimately chosen.

As late as 1980, plans instead named the station "Valley". Causeway Bay was one of the stations planned for above-station property development, along with Admiralty, Wan Chai, and Western Market.

The Island line was built last; by the time construction had started in October 1982, the Kwun Tong and Tsuen Wan lines were already operational.

=== Construction ===
At least 5,000 local residents were rehoused to accommodate construction of the Island line.

Contract 405 for the construction of the station and tunnels was awarded to Kumagai Gumi, and civil works began in October 1982. The joint venture between Marples Ridgway and LTA also built the station's structure.

The station construction site was sold by the MTR in 1984 to Taisei Corporation for $380m, now the location of Sogo Hong Kong. The station opened with the first section of the Island line from Admiralty to Chai Wan on 31 May 1985.

=== Design ===
Along with 36 other stations on the Kwun Tong, Tsuen Wan, and Island Lines, Causeway Bay was designed by then-chief architect Roland Paoletti, who would later go on to design the Jubilee Line extension of the London Underground. Paoletti elected for each station to feature its own colour scheme and walls painted in calligraphy–Causeway Bay's station colour is purple.

== Services ==
The station is situated between Wan Chai and Tin Hau stations on the Island line. The typical off-peak service is 17 trains per hour in both directions, which is a train every 3–6 minutes.

== Station layout ==
The platforms of Causeway Bay station are constructed in a stacked arrangement, with platform 1 above platform 2.

G	Ground level	Exits
-	Western Concourse	Vending machines, ATM
L1; Concourses	Eastern Concourse	Customer Service, MTRShops
L1; Concourses	Eastern Concourse	Hang Seng Bank, vending machines, ATM
L1; Concourses	Eastern Concourse	Octopus promotion machine, tourist information centre
L1; Concourses	Western Concourse	Customer Service
L1; Concourses	Western Concourse	ATM, i-centre internet service
L2; Upper Platform	Side platform, doors will open on the left
L2; Upper Platform	Platform 1	Island line towards Chai Wan (Tin Hau) →
L3; Concourse	Southern Concourse	Customer Service
L3; Concourse	Southern Concourse	Vending machines, ATM, Octopus Promotion Machine
L5; Lower Platform	Side platform, doors will open on the right
L5; Lower Platform	Platform 2	← Island line towards Kennedy Town (Wan Chai)

== Entrances/exits ==
Causeway Bay is a primary shopping district in Hong Kong (Note: This causes the station to be very busy all day long.) with exits from the MTR leading directly into major outlets such as Sogo and Times Square, which can be accessed through a long, upward sloping pedestrian walkway at Exit A.

Unlike other MTR stations, there are three different concourses in Causeway Bay station. After exiting the paid areas through the turnstiles, the other two concourses are inaccessible underground. The west and east concourses were opened on 31 May 1985 with the opening of the station, while the south concourse and Exit A were opened in 1994 with the opening of Times Square.

=== South concourse ===
In the basement of Times Square:

- A: Times Square

=== West concourse ===
In the basement of Causeway Bay Plaza (Phase 1):

- B: Causeway Bay Plaza
- C: Sino Plaza

=== East concourse ===
In the basement of Sogo Department Store:

- D1/D2/D3/D4: Sogo Department Store
- E: Victoria Park
- F1: Jardine's Crescent
- F2: Hysan Place

== Transport connections ==
=== Bus routes ===
These are the bus routes found in the vicinity of Causeway Bay station that provide connections with other areas not served by the MTR including Aberdeen/Wah Kwai Estate, Braemar Hill, Happy Valley, Jardine's Lookout, Kennedy Town, Lai Tak Tsuen, Lei Tung Estate, Tsuen Wan, Sham Wan/Wong Chuk Hang, Hoi Lai Estate, South Horizons, The Peak, Tin Wan, Tsing Yi/Cheung On, Wah Fu.

=== Hong Kong Tramways ===
Hong Kong Island's tramway system consists of an inner loop branching out at Causeway Bay towards Happy Valley. The nearest tram stop is located along Percival Street near the end of Matheson Street.

== Gallery ==
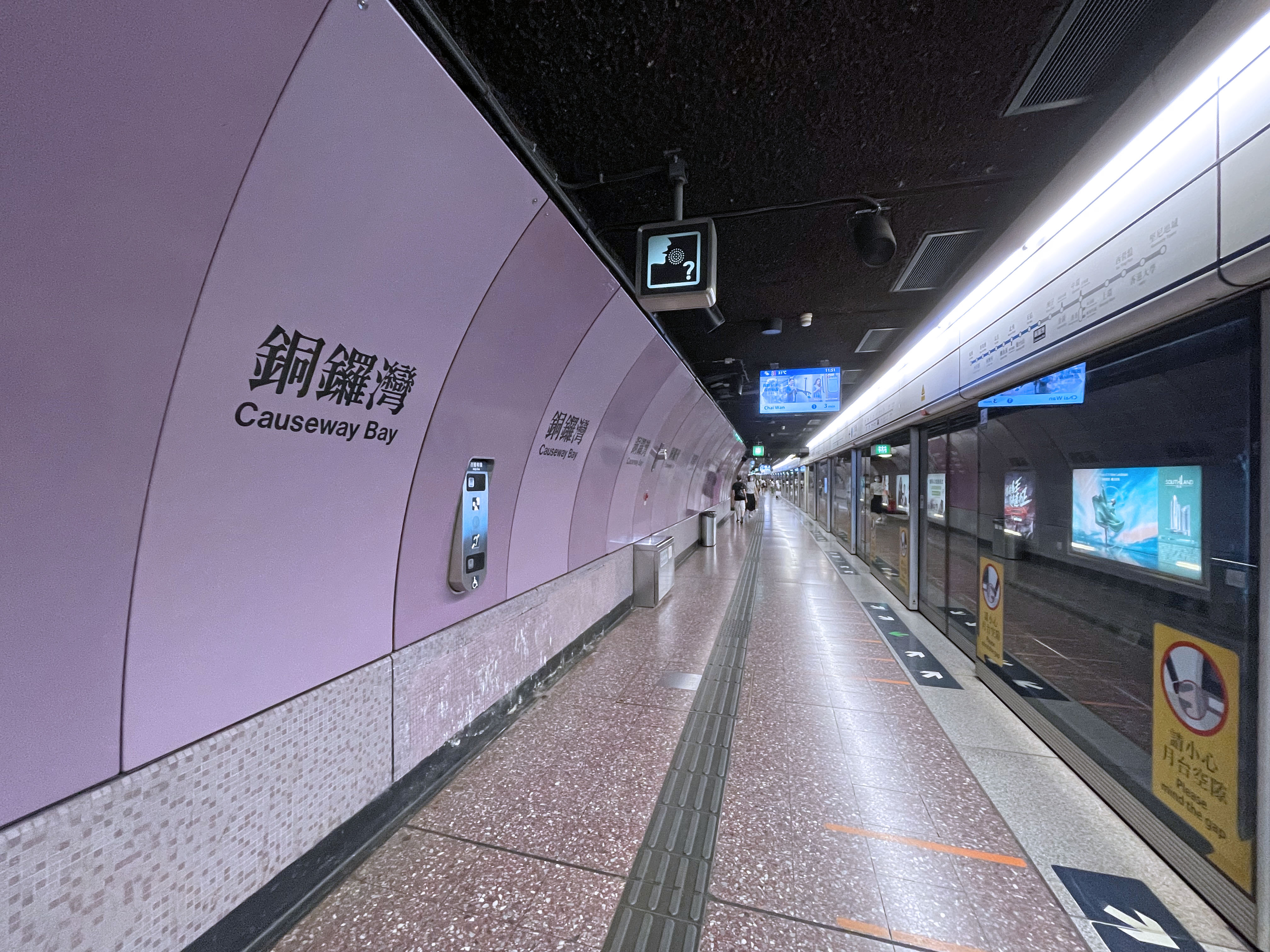
Platform 1 (2021)

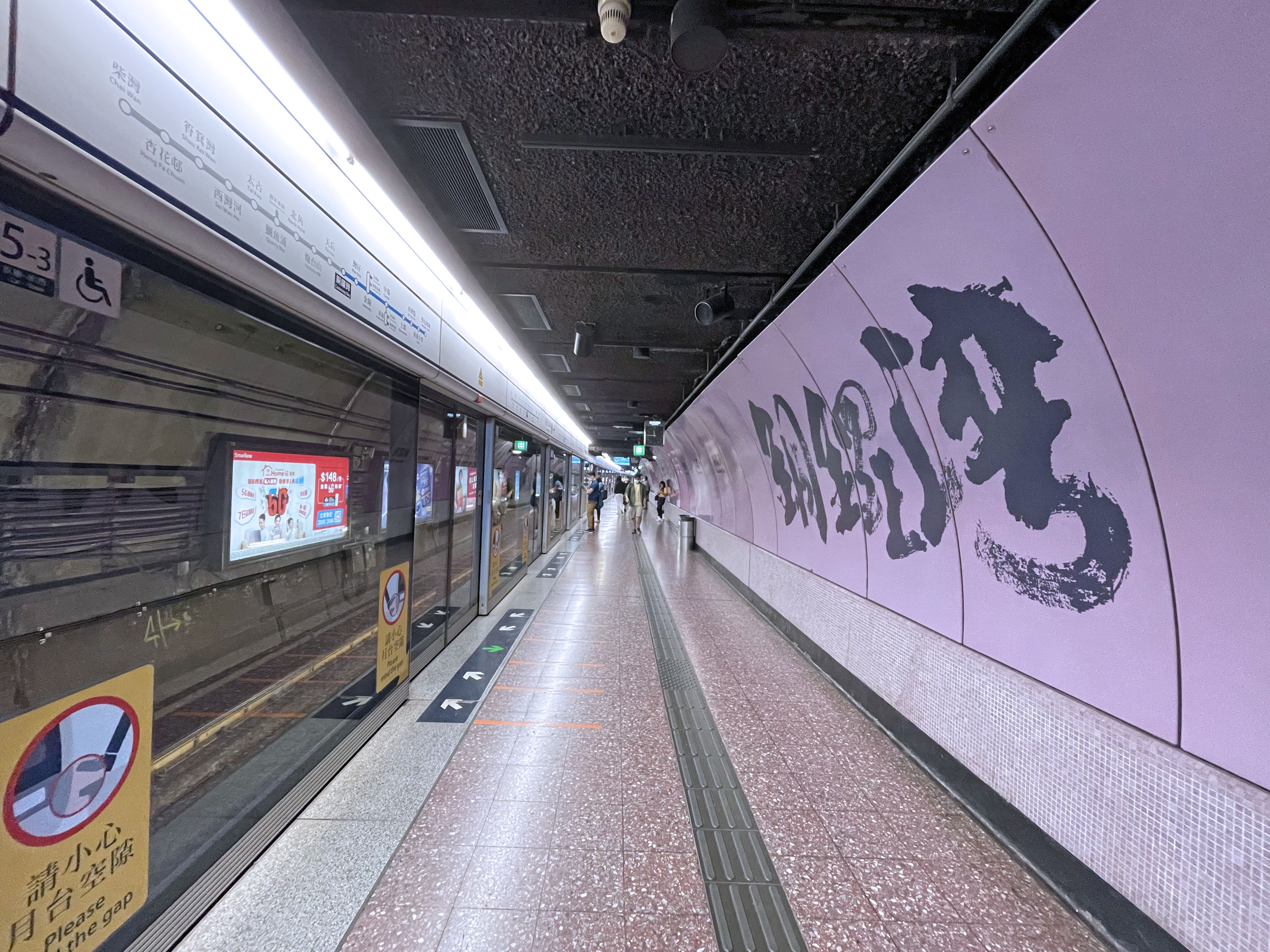
Platform 2 (2021)

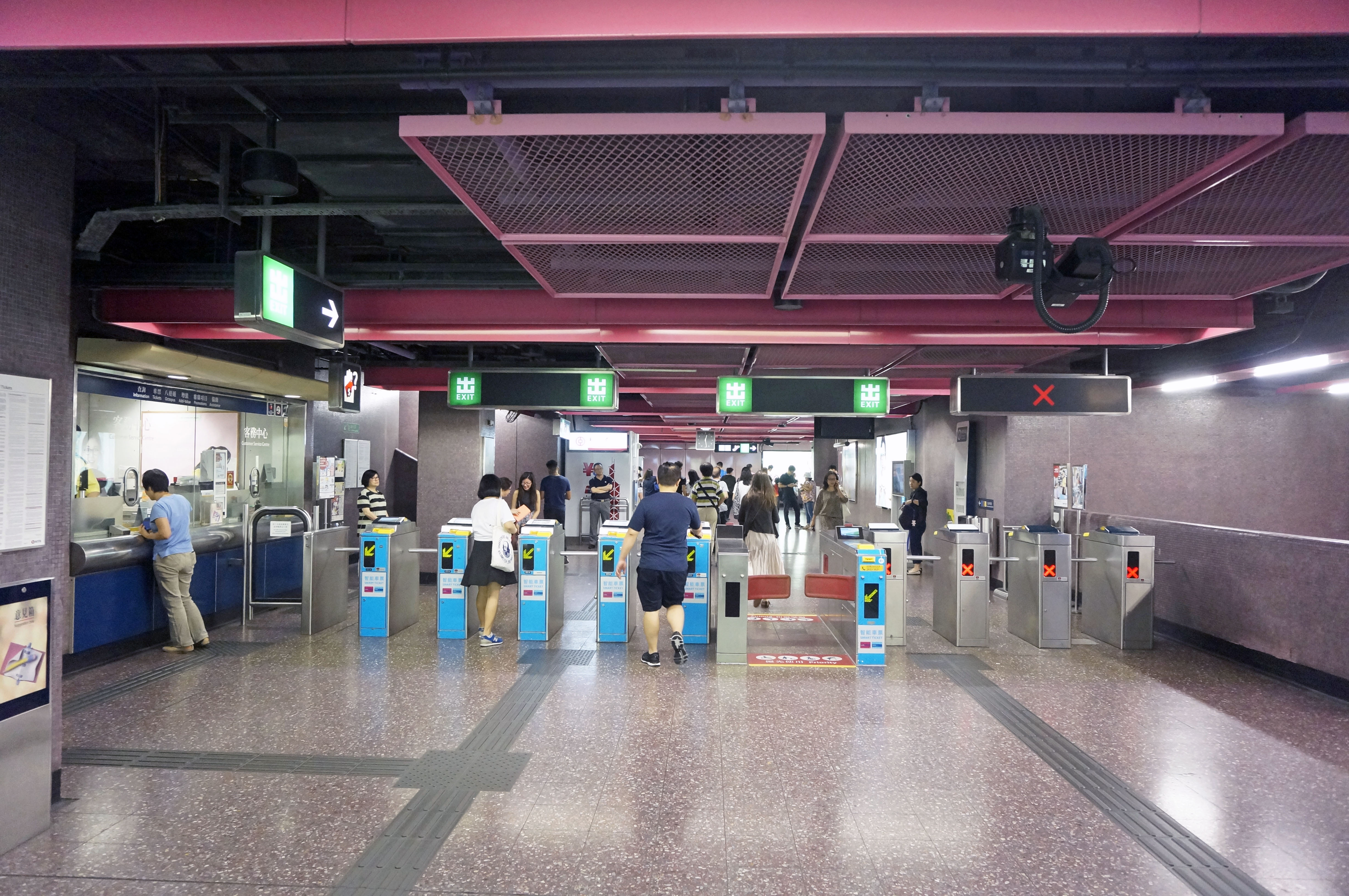
West Concourse (2018)

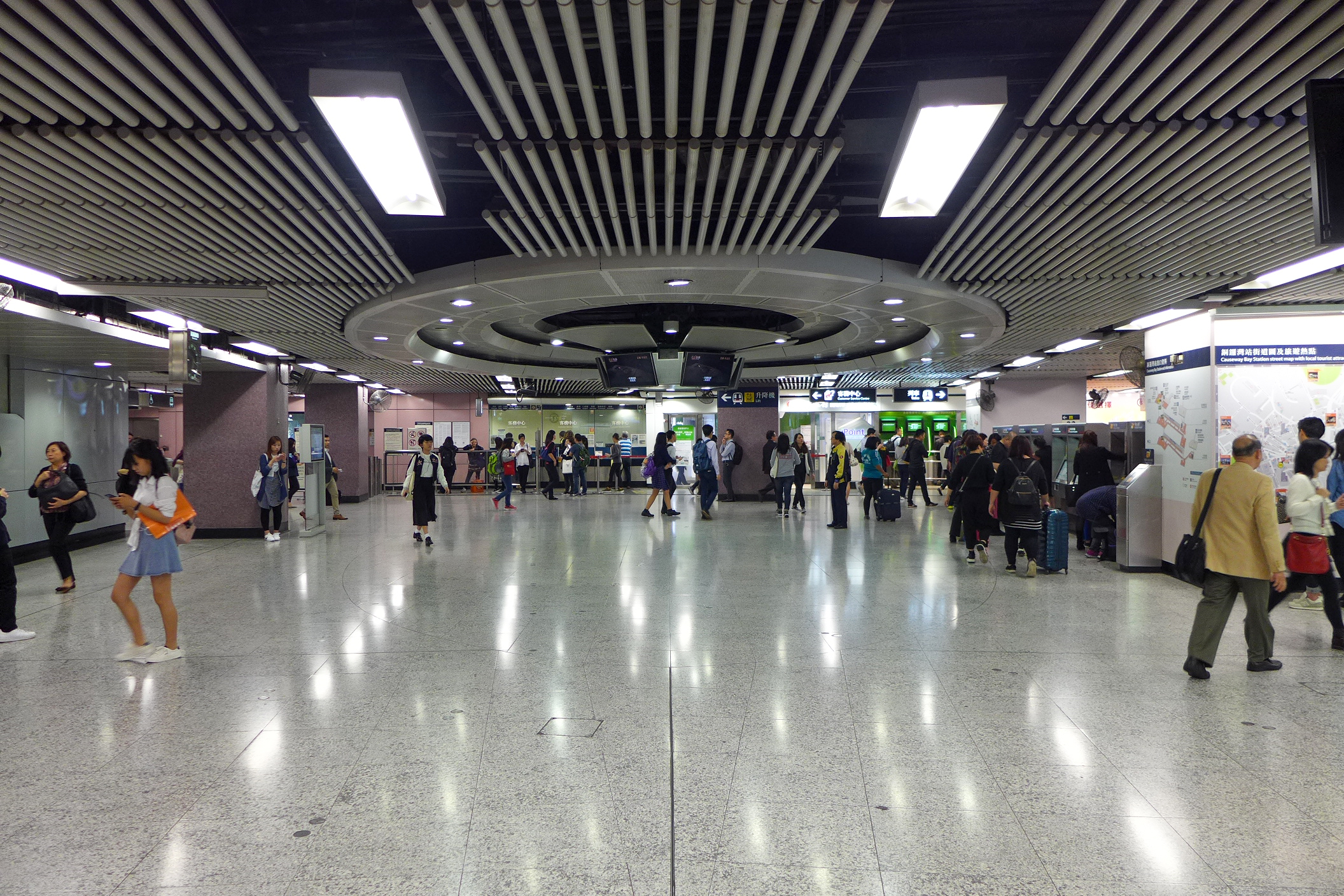
East Concourse (2017)

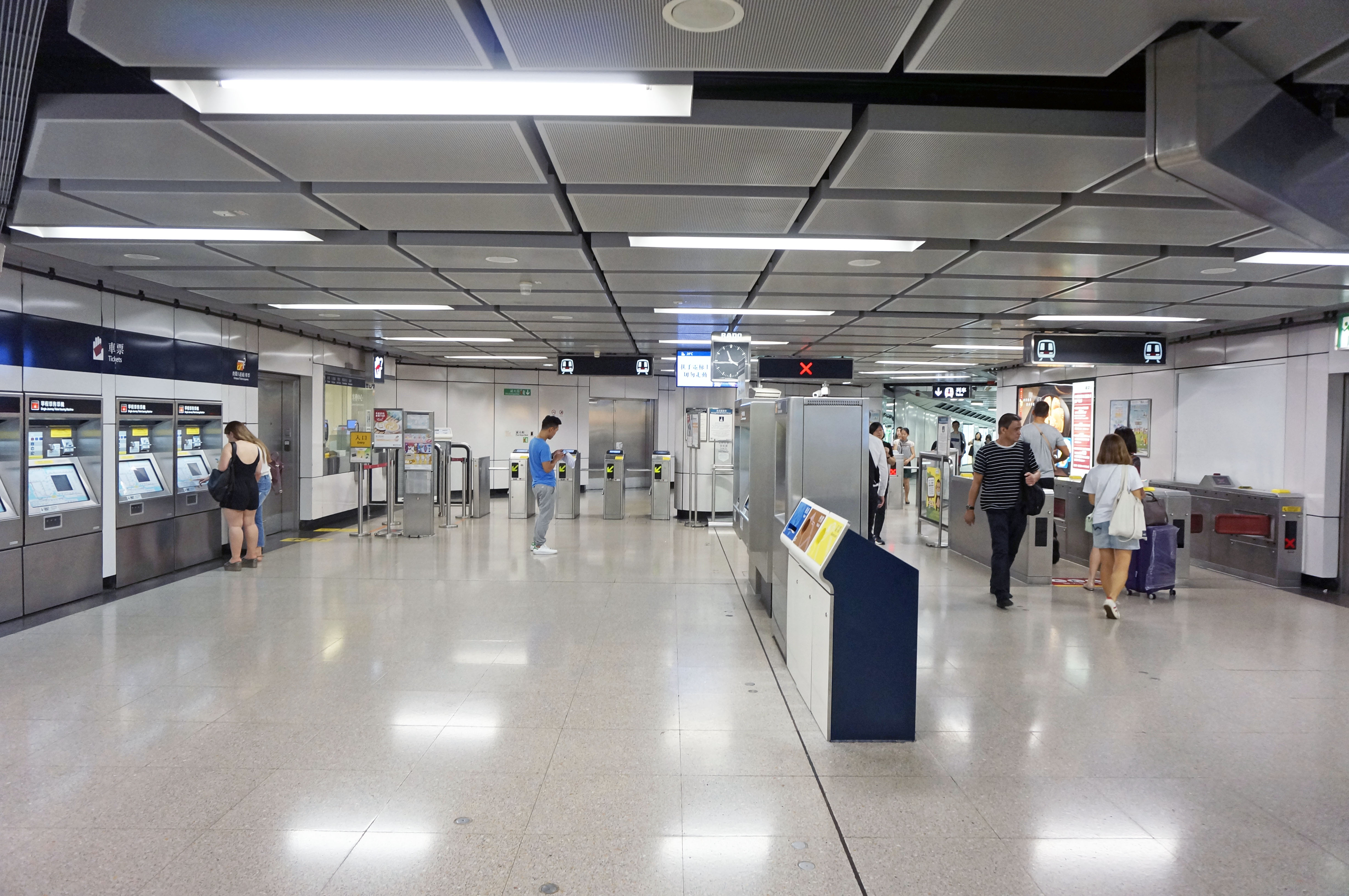
South Concourse (2018)
