= East Point, Hong Kong =

Former cape in Hong Kong

Coordinates: 22°16′49″N 114°11′05″E

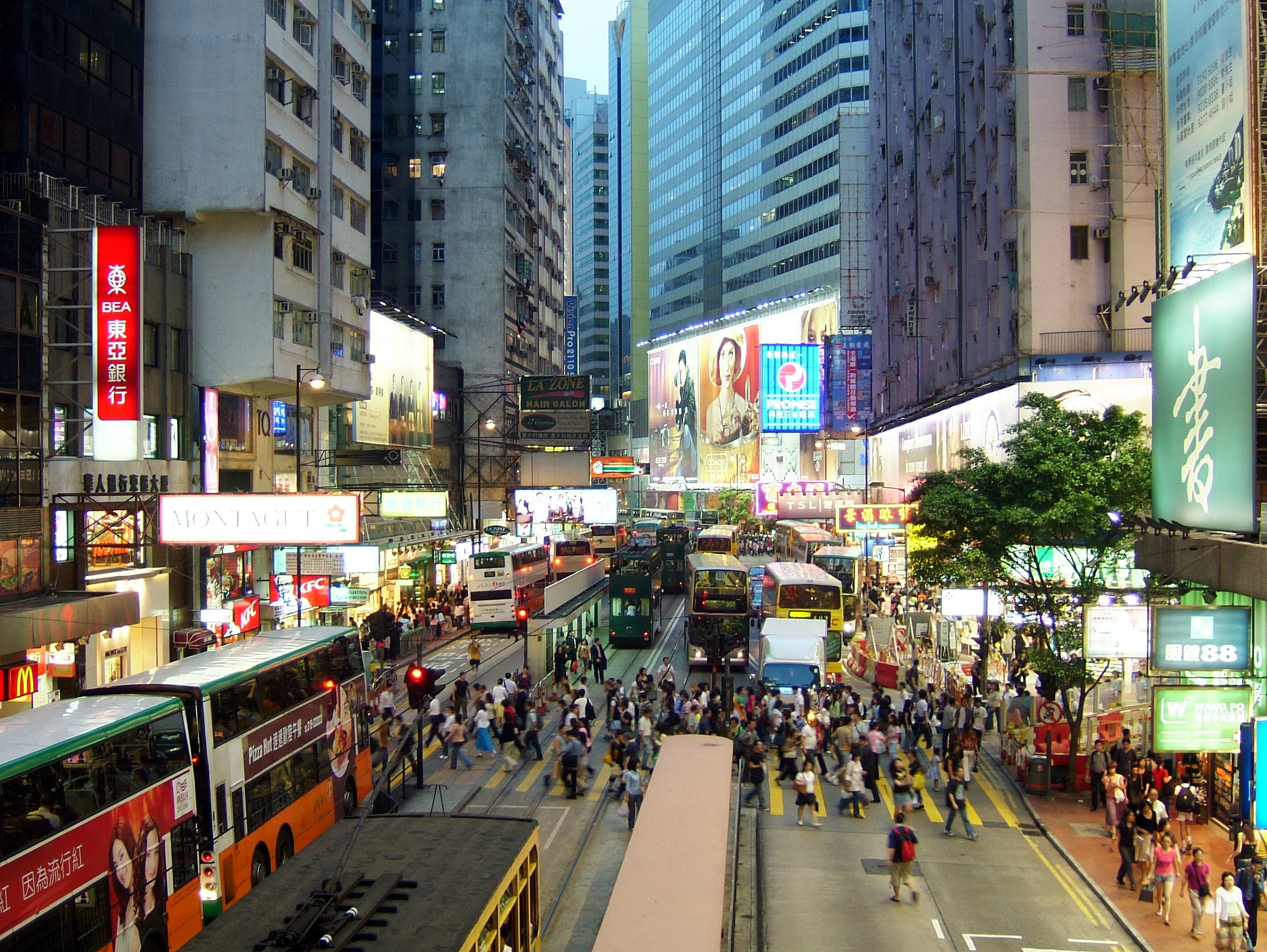
- The busy Yee Wo Street crossing
- Traditional Chinese: 鵝頭嘴/東角
- Simplified Chinese: 鹅头嘴/东角
Transcriptions
Standard Mandarin
- Hanyu Pinyin: Dōngjiǎo
Yue: Cantonese
- Yale Romanization: dūng gok
- Jyutping: dung1 gok3

East Point was a spit on the northern shore of Hong Kong Island, Hong Kong. It extended from East Point Hill, i.e. Lee Garden towards Kellett Island and marked the eastern limits of the early City of Victoria. The piece of land separated Causeway Bay in the east and Wong Nai Chung in the west. Streams and muds from Tai Hang and Wong Nai Chung (now buried beneath Canal Road as a subterranean river) shaped the spit.

== Geography ==
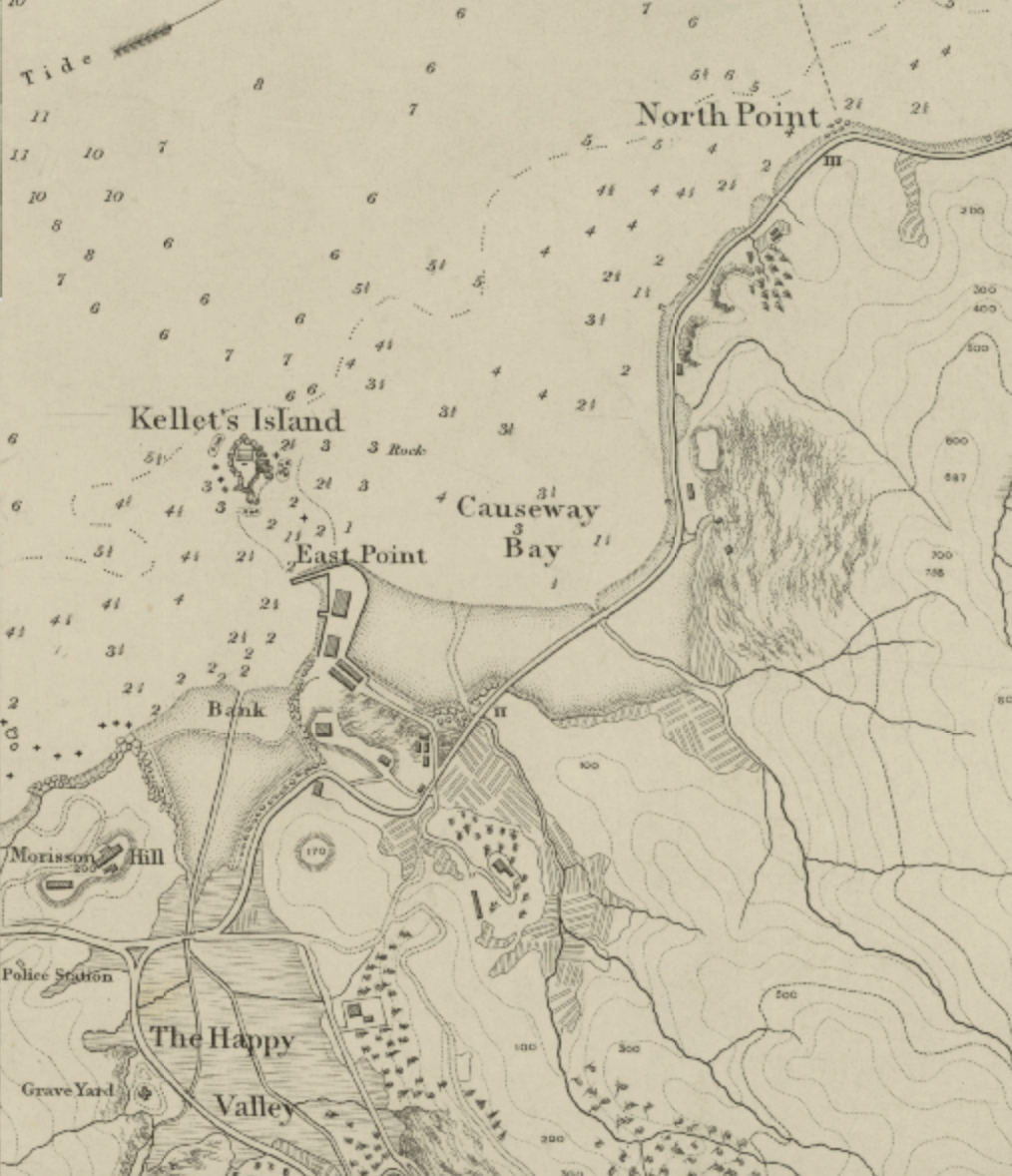
East Point and Causeway Bay as shown on a map in 1845.

Two sides of the spit were reclaimed over a hundred years. The first stage was in the mid-19th century. The east of the cape was reclaimed to the edge of Victoria Park and the west to Hennessy Road. The second stage was between World War I and World War II. Its west was reclaimed to Gloucester Road. The shape of the cape was mostly lost. For the construction of Cross-Harbour Tunnel, further reclamation extended the land to Kellett Island and the cape was completely buried.

Physically, the Causeway Bay station of the MTR and World Trade Centre are built on the body of East Point. Windsor House and Paterson Street fall on its first stage reclamation. The above two areas were referred to as 'East Point', while to its west was Bowrington.

Large scale reclamations make the geographic feature and division less obvious. Causeway Bay originally referred to the circular tung lo-shaped bay. It also referred to the east shore of the bay, i.e. the present-day area in Tin Hau station. It gradually replaced East Point as the name of that area.

== History ==
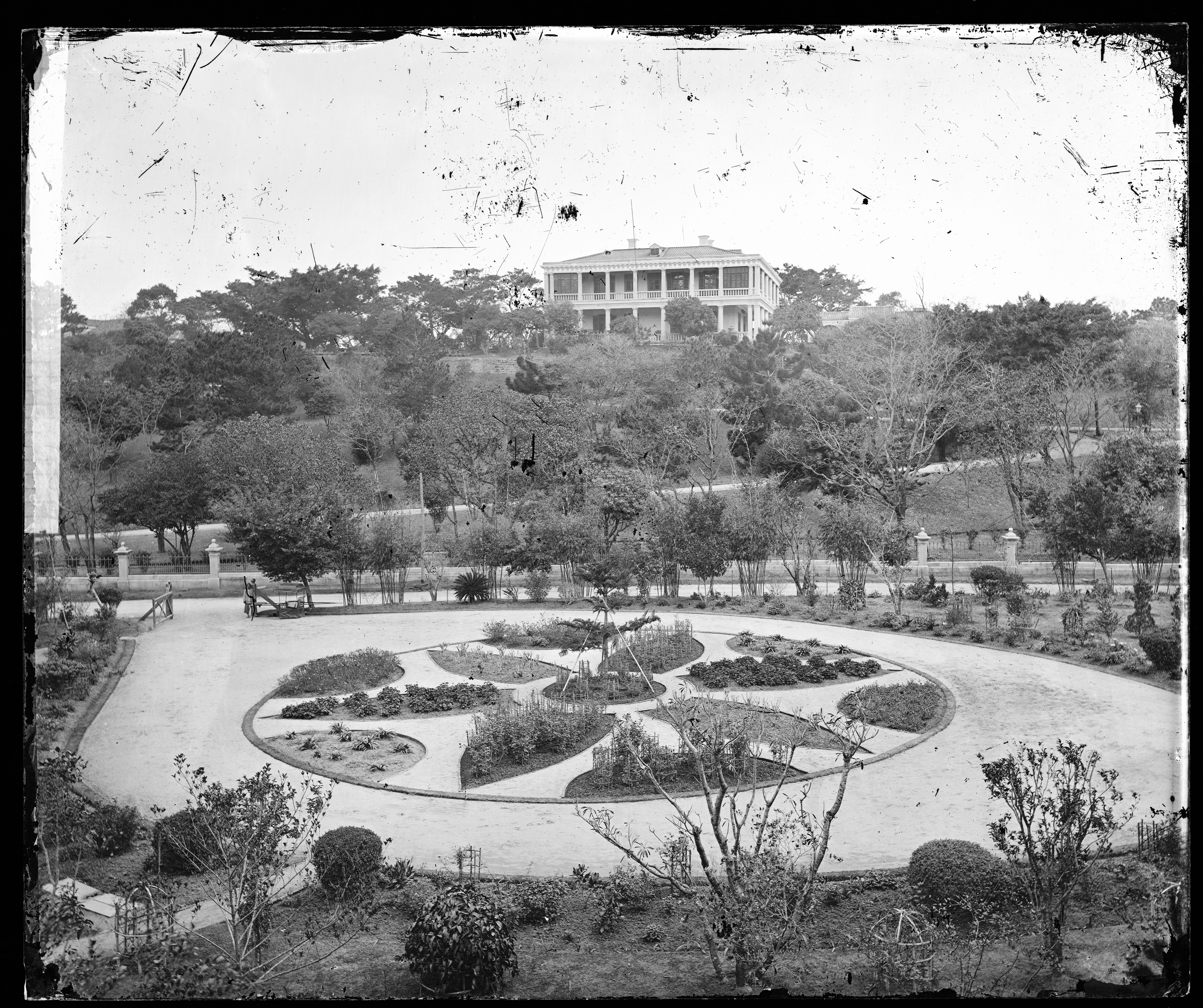
Jardine's Garden and House at East Point c. 1868. Photograph by John Thomson.

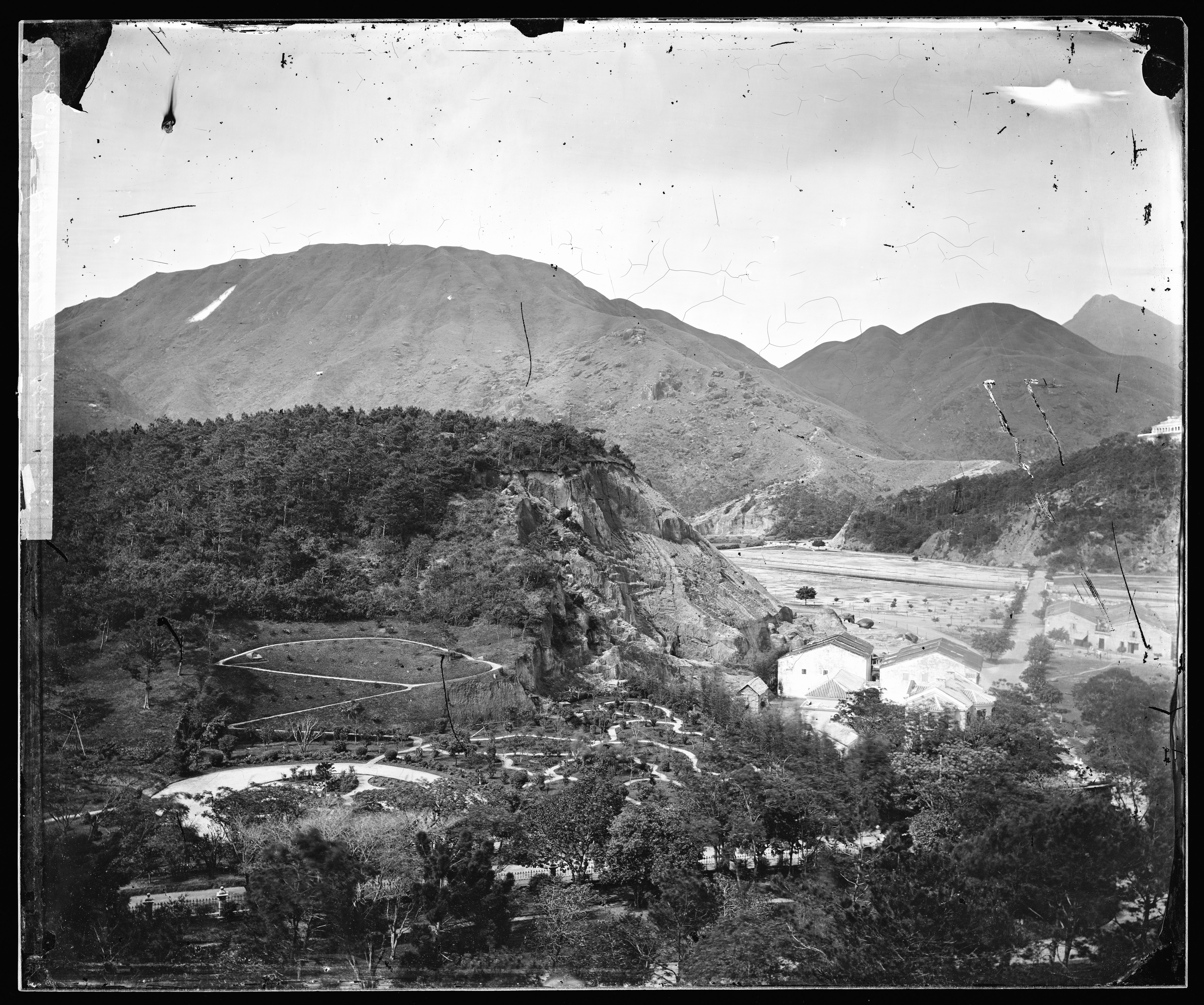
View of Happy Valley from East Point c. 1868. Photograph by John Thomson.

Having briefly named "Matheson's Point", much of the land of East Point was historically in the hands of Jardine Matheson, which had their original Hong Kong godowns and offices there, near Gloucester Road and Cannon Street. Swire once had a sugar refinery in Sugar Street.

== Present features ==
East Point is one of Hong Kong's major shopping districts. It includes the 13-storey Japanese-style department store Sogo, as well as shopping centres such as Times Square and Hysan Place. There are also smaller malls such as World Trade Centre, Windsor House, Hang Lung Centre, Fashion Island, Fashion Walk, Lee Garden One and Lee Garden Two. Causeway Bay is one of the most crowded and central areas in Hong Kong. The area contains many trendy shops carrying both locally made and imported fashion and products from around the world. As such, it is a popular social spot for young people. Many shops are open until after midnight.

Notable hotels in East Point include The Excelsior (demolished) and Regal Hong Kong Hotel. Several boutique hotels have opened recently including Mira Moon Hotel on Jaffe Road.

For years, Jardine Matheson has fired a shot off the Noonday Gun at noon every day at East Point, by Victoria Harbour, slightly eastward of the former Kellett Island. The gunshots have served as time signals for many generations of old inhabitants of Hong Kong. This tradition still continues today. This is the "Noonday Gun" mentioned in the Noël Coward song "Mad Dogs and Englishmen".

== Legacy ==
The name East Point is still found in East Point Road (東角道) and East Point Centre (東角中心).
