= Pearl City Mansion =

Building in Causeway Bay, Hong Kong

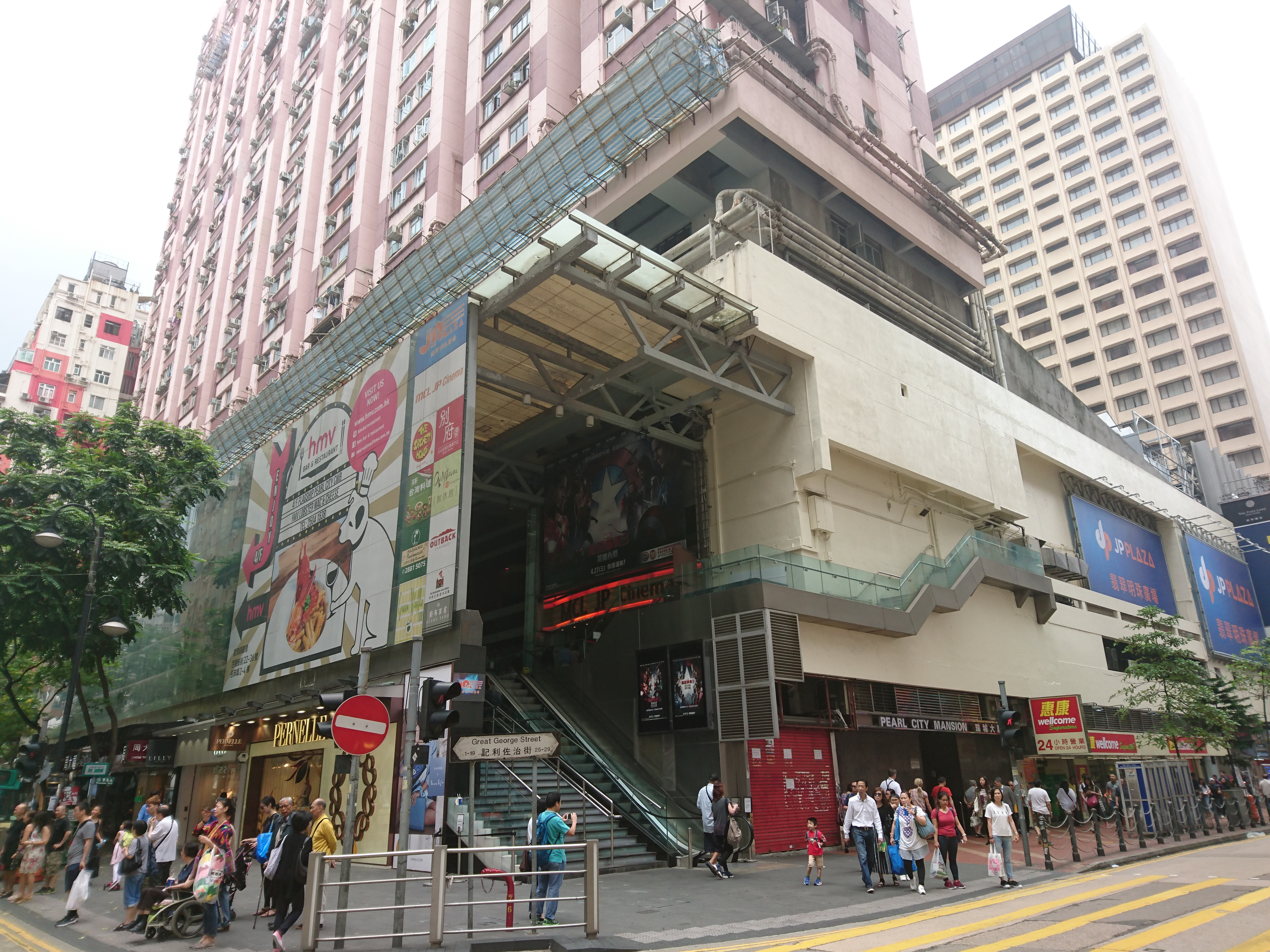
- Interactive map of the Pearl City Mansion area

General information
- Status: Completed
- Type: Residential; Commercial offices
- Architectural style: Modernism
- Location: 22-36 Paterson Street, Causeway Bay; Hong Kong
- Coordinates: 22.2810°N 114.1858°E
- Completed: 1971; 55 years ago

Height
- Roof: 109 m (358 ft)

Technical details
- Floor count: 34

Pearl City Mansion is a 34-storey, 109 m (358 ft) skyscraper at 22-36 Paterson Street in Causeway Bay, Hong Kong near Causeway Bay station. When completed in 1971, it was the tallest building in the city, surpassing Wing On House in Central. It was also the first building in the city to achieve a height greater than 100 metres.

== See also ==
- Timeline of tallest buildings in Hong Kong
