= Wan Chai station =

MTR station on Hong Kong Island

Wan Chai 灣仔
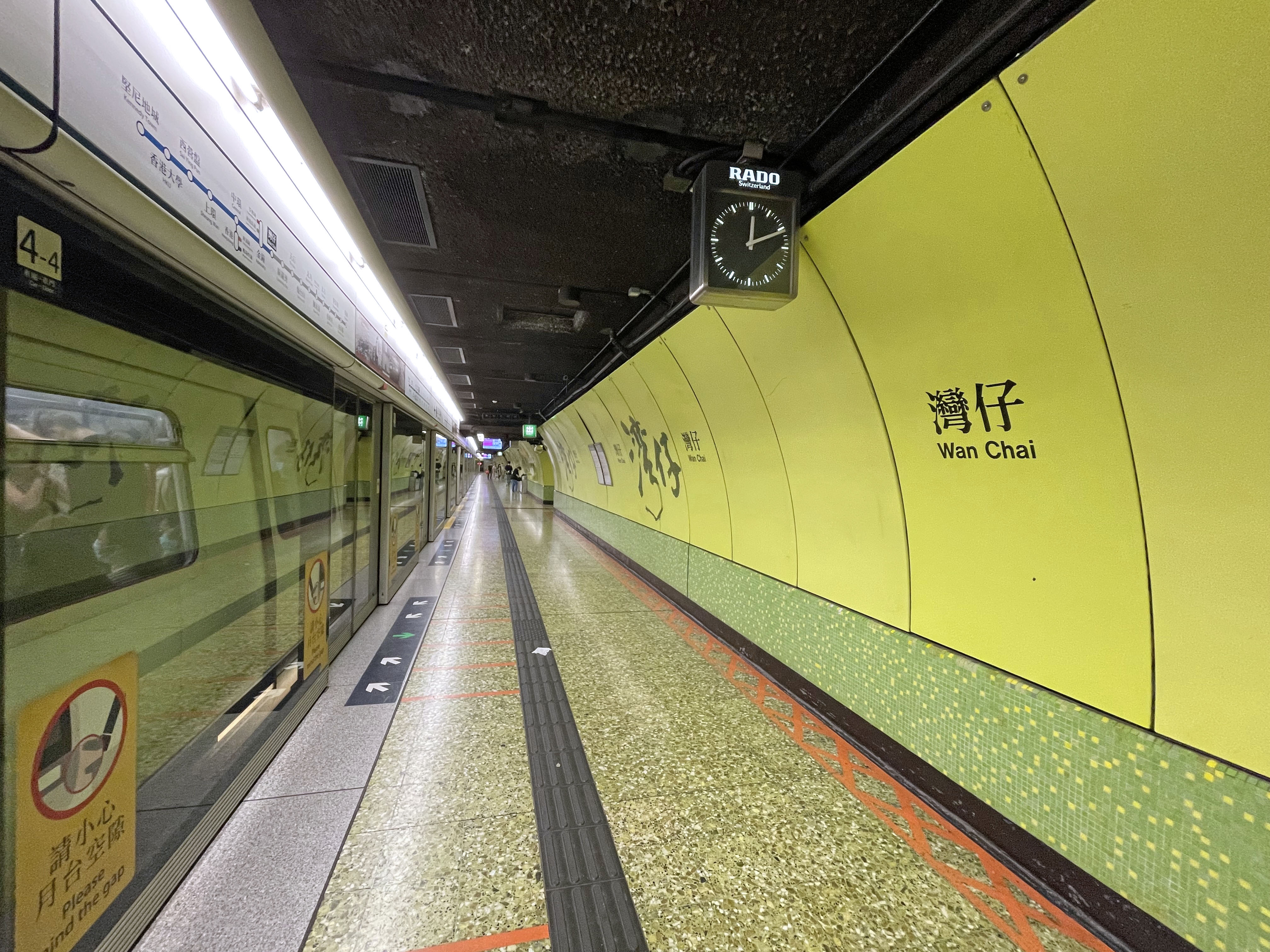
- Platform 2 of Wan Chai station

Chinese name
- Traditional Chinese: 灣仔
- Simplified Chinese: 湾仔
- Cantonese Yale: Wāanjái
- Literal meaning: Little Bay
Transcriptions
Standard Mandarin
- Hanyu Pinyin: Wānzǎi
Yue: Cantonese
- Yale Romanization: Wāanjái
- Jyutping: Waan1zai2

General information
- Location: Intersection between Hennessy Road and O'Brien Road, Wan Chai; Wan Chai District, Hong Kong
- Coordinates: 22°16′38″N 114°10′22″E
- System: MTR rapid transit station
- Owner: MTR Corporation
- Operator: MTR Corporation
- Line: Island line
- Platforms: 2 (2 split level side platforms)
- Tracks: 2
- Connections: Ferry; Tram; Bus, minibus; Exhibition Centre station (via footbridge from Exit A5)

Construction
- Structure type: Underground
- Platform levels: 2
- Accessible: Yes

Other information
- Station code: WAC

History
- Opened: 31 May 1985; 41 years ago

Services
| Preceding station | MTR | Following station |
|---|---|---|
| Admiralty towards Kennedy Town | Island line | Causeway Bay towards Chai Wan |
Route map
Location
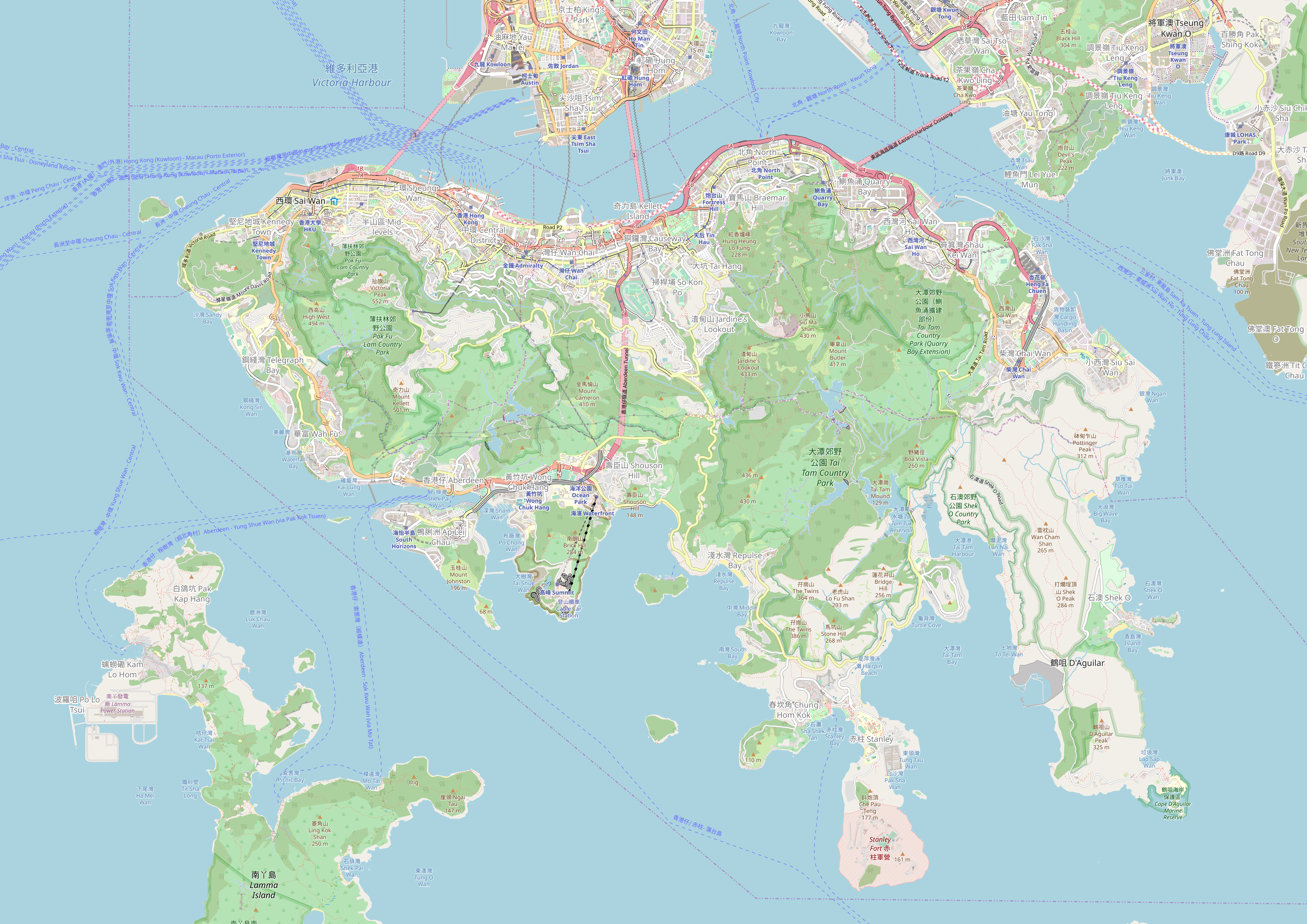
- Location within MTR Location within Hong Kong urban core Location within Hong Kong Island

Wan Chai (Chinese: 灣仔) is a station on the Island line of the Hong Kong MTR rapid transit system. The station's livery is chartreuse. It serves the Wan Chai locality within the district of the same name. The station platforms are located underneath Hennessy Road, a major trunk road connecting the Central and Eastern districts.

== History ==
The station was built under Southorn Playground. It opened along with the Island line on 31 May 1985. It was built by a Bachy Soletanche–Dragages joint venture and Japanese contractor Maeda. Entrance D was opened for public on 22 December 2017. Its passageway crosses underneath Southorn Playground and Johnston Road, then joins the underground mall in Lee Tung Street Redevelopment Project. It is expected to ease the overcrowding problem at entrance A3 and Johnston Road crossing.

== Station layout ==
| U1 | Footbridge | Footbridge along O'Brien Road towards Wan Chai North (Immigration Tower, Central Plaza, Hong Kong Convention and Exhibition Centre, Wan Chai Pier, Exhibition Centre) |
| G | Ground level | Exits |
| L1 | Upper Concourse | Customer Service, MTRShops |
| L1 | Upper Concourse | Hang Seng Bank, vending machines, ATM |
| L1 | Upper Concourse | Octopus promotion machine |
| L3; Upper Platform | Platform 1 | Island line towards Chai Wan (Causeway Bay) → |
| L3; Upper Platform | Side platform, doors will open on the right |
| L3; Upper Platform | Lower Concourse | Customer Service |
| L3; Upper Platform | Lower Concourse | iCentre internet service |
| L5; Lower Platform | Platform 2 | ← Island line towards Kennedy Town (Admiralty) |
| L5; Lower Platform | Side platform, doors will open on the left |

The platforms of Wan Chai station are constructed in a stacked arrangement, with Platform 1 above Platform 2.

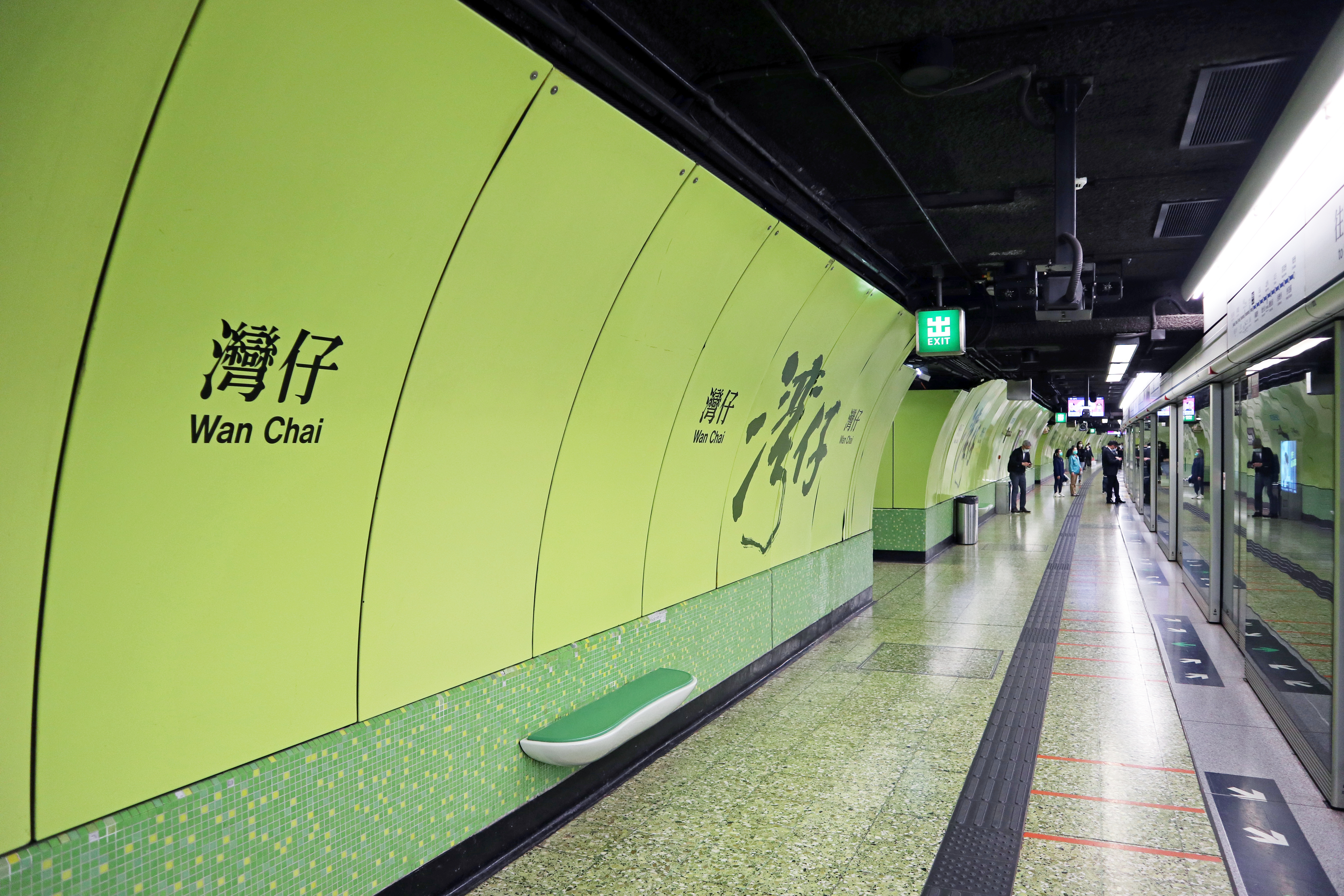
Platform 1 of Wan Chai station

Due to the large catchment of Wan Chai station and the locality as a business hub and centre for tourists, government offices, foreign embassies and institutions, the station houses more than 50 ticket gates as distributed across three ticket halls (two at the concourse and one at platform level). There are 8 station exits, two of which were constructed in 1999 to provide a more convenient reach for the southern areas of Wan Chai. The footbridge above O'Brien Road, which connects the Hong Kong Convention and Exhibition Centre, the Immigration Tower (Immigration Department of Hong Kong) and the Star Ferry Pier (Wan Chai Pier), was extended to reach one of these new exits above Hennessy Road.

The tunnel for eastbound trains towards Causeway Bay station has once featured a mobile advertisement, which was presented in the form of a slideshow across the length of the tunnel. The large number of sequential panels allowed passengers to view the advertisement as a slideshow, as trains undertakes their journey to the next station.

== Usage and overcrowding ==
As the only railway station of Wan Chai and its Central Business District, this station serves a large number of residents and commuters. In reference to consultation document Our Future Railway, average train loading from Wan Chai to Causeway Bay is approximately 71%. Government consultants analysed that there would not be a significant drop by 2031, even if train frequencies were to increase.

== Entrances/exits ==
- A1: Lockhart Road
- A2: Hennessy Road (Northern Side)
- A3: Johnston Road
- A4: Hennessy Road (By Wanchai Computer Centre)
- A5: Hennessy Road Footbridge, Central Plaza, (HK Convention and Exhibition Centre/Exhibition Centre Station)
- B1/B2: Southorn Playground
- C: Lockhart Road
- D: Lee Tung Avenue
