= Yee Wo Street =

Street in Hong Kong

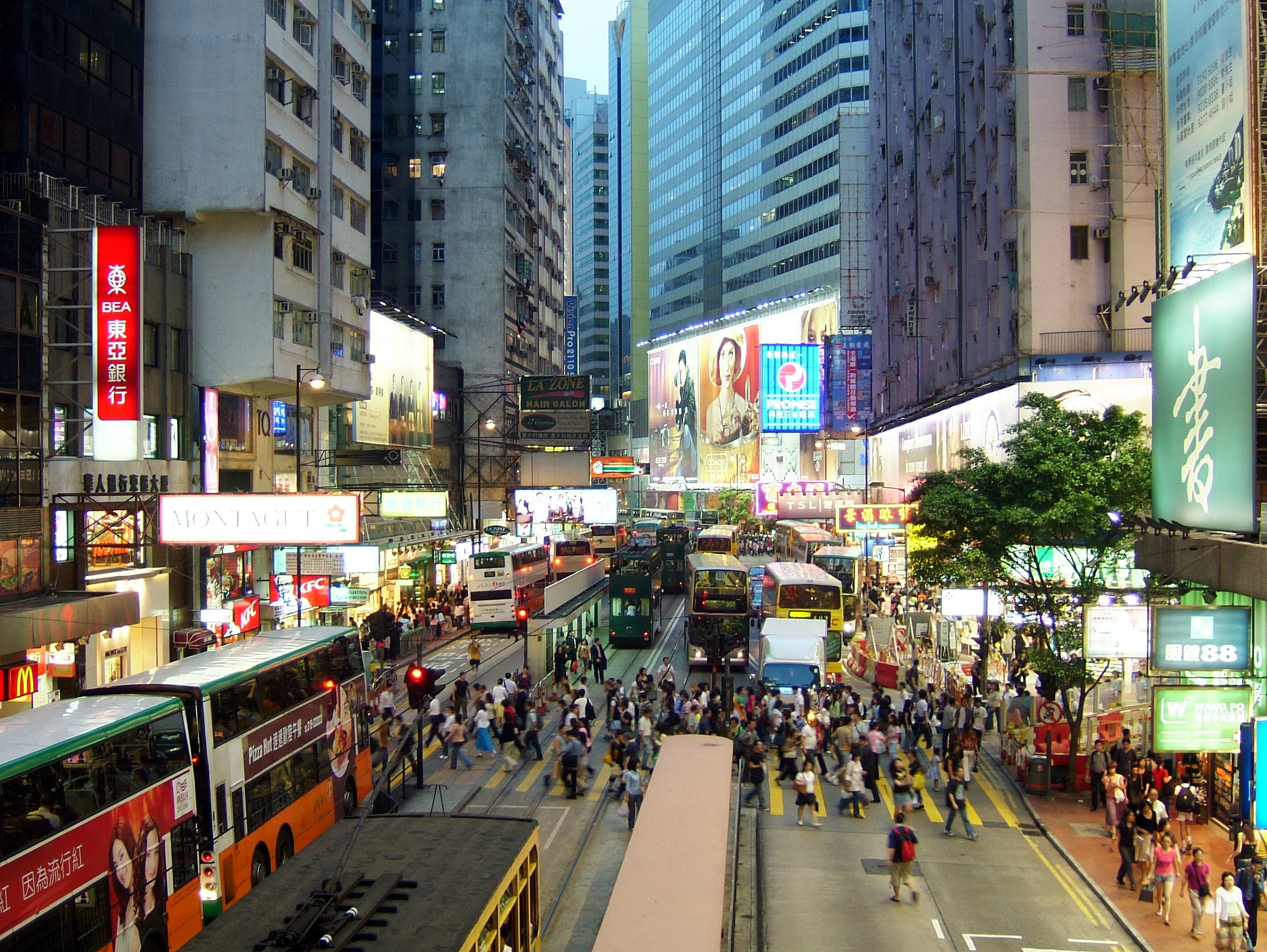
- Yee Wo Street in 2006, looking west towards the Sogo department store from the iconic circular footbridge
- Interactive map of Yee Wo Street
- Native name: 怡和街 (Yue Chinese)
- Former name: Kasuga-dori (1942–1945, during Japanese occupation)
- Length: 300 metres (980 ft)
- Width: 2 lanes of traffic eastbound, 1 lane westbound
- Location: Causeway Bay, Hong Kong
- Coordinates: 22.2798°N 114.1860°E

Construction
- Inauguration: 1902; 124 years ago

Yee Wo Street
- Chinese: 怡和街
Transcriptions
Standard Mandarin
- Hanyu Pinyin: Yíhé jiē
- Wade–Giles: I^{2}-ho^{2} chieh^{1}
- IPA: [ǐ.xɤ̌ tɕjé]
Yue: Cantonese
- Yale Romanization: Yìhwó gāai
- Jyutping: Ji^{4}-wo^{4}^{-}^{2} gaai^{1}
- IPA: [ji˩.wɔ˧˥ kaj˥]

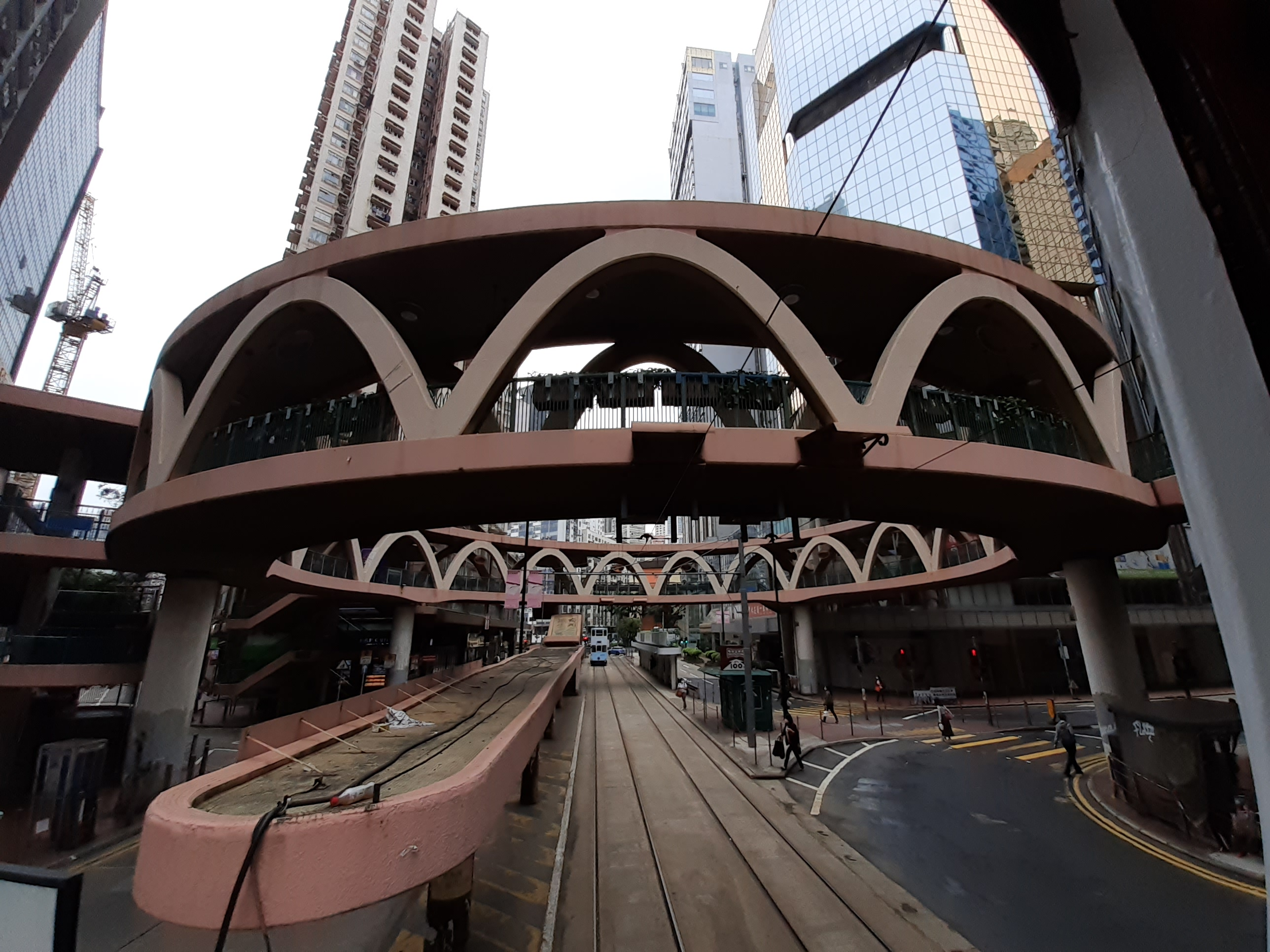
The iconic circular footbridge HF85, towering over the junction with Pennington Street (on the right) and Sugar Street (out of shot to the left)

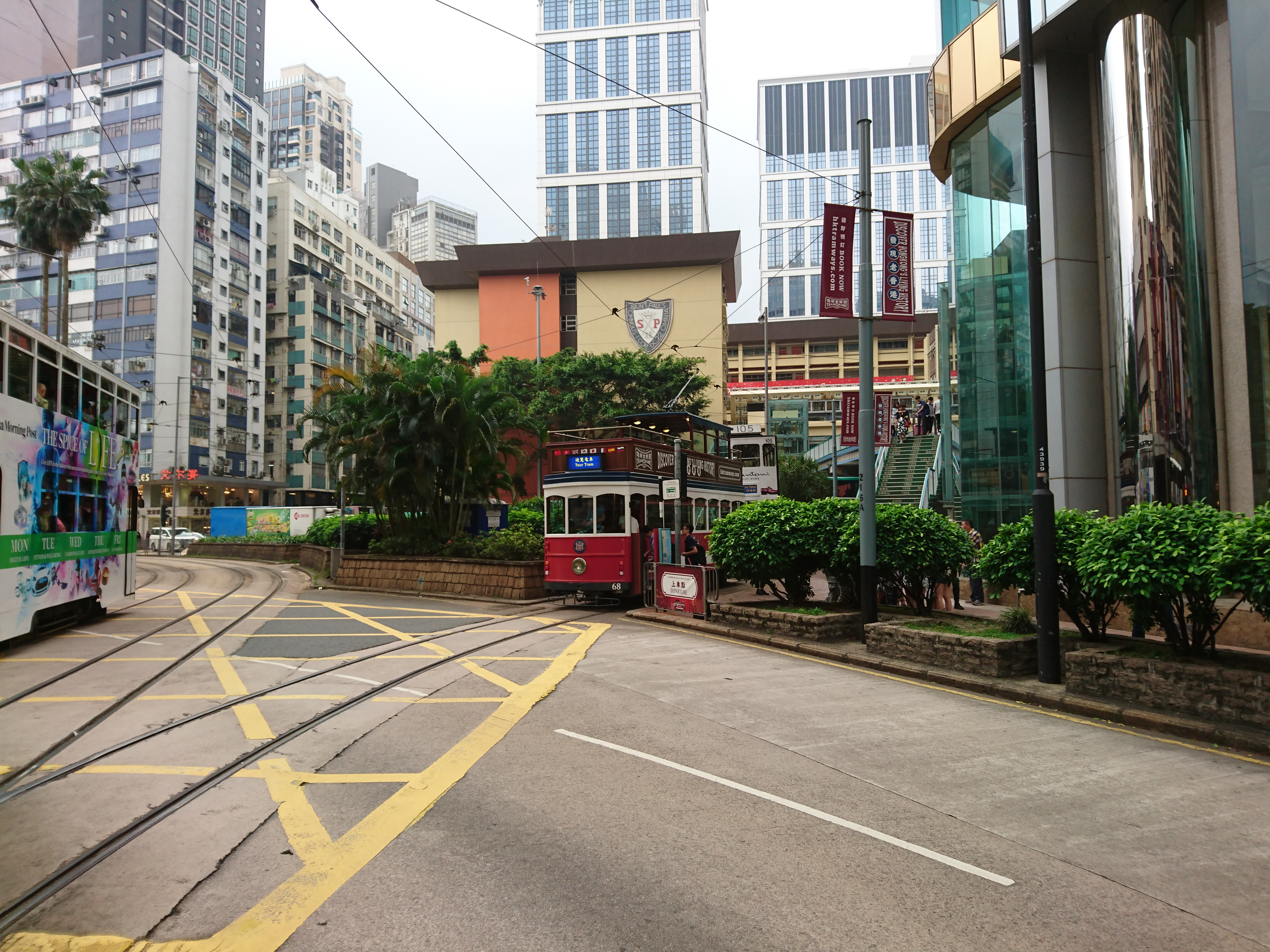
Causeway Bay Terminus at the east end of Yee Wo Street

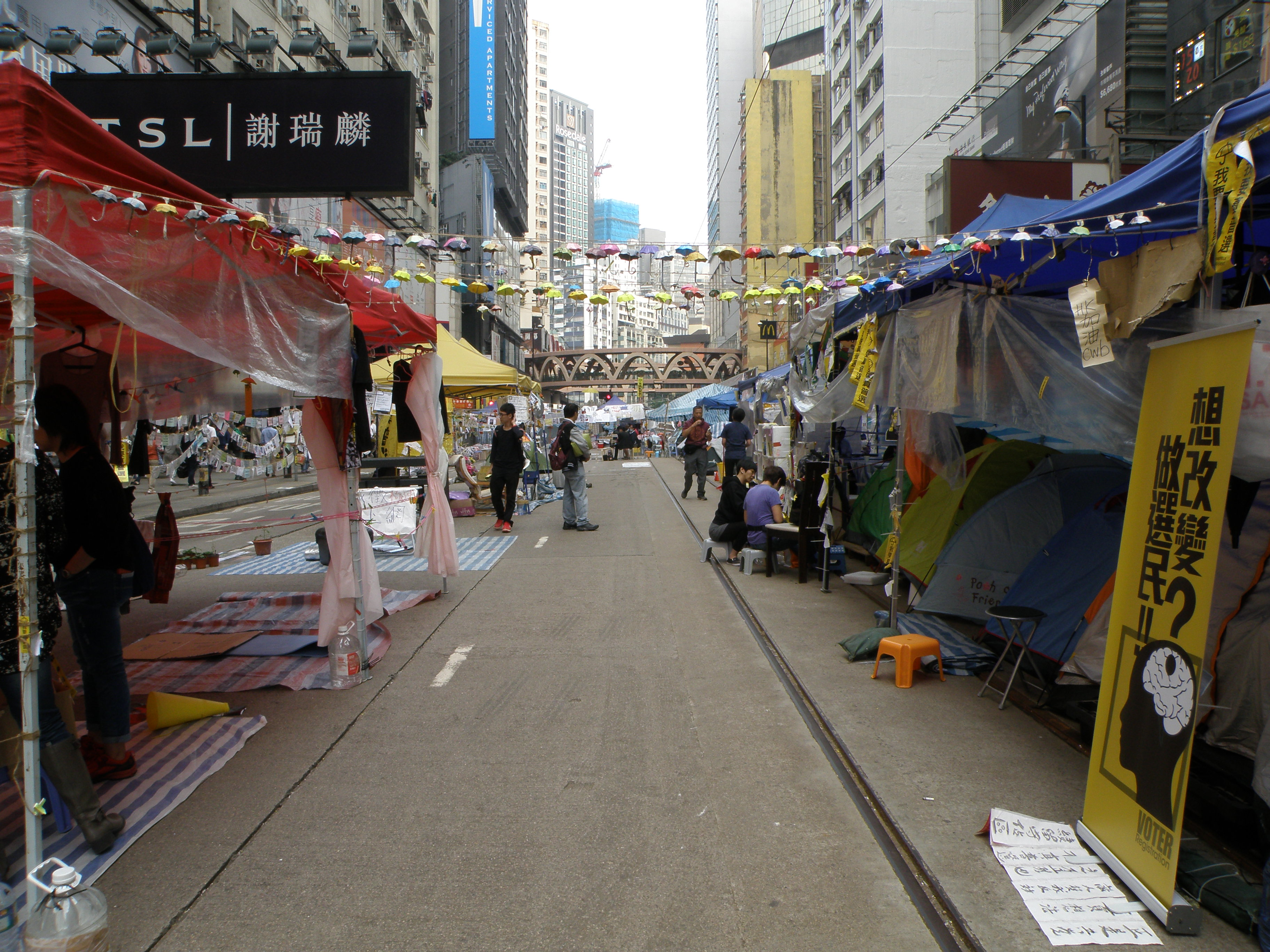
Yee Wo Street during the 2014 Hong Kong protests

Yee Wo Street (Chinese: 怡和街; Cantonese Yale: yi4 wo2 gaai1) is a main thoroughfare in East Point, Hong Kong Island, connecting Hennessy Road in the west with Causeway Road in the east.

The major junction with Hennessy Road – where East Point Road, Great George Street, Jardine's Bazaar, and Jardine's Crescent meet – is one of the busiest in Hong Kong, and this is reflected in the extra-wide pedestrian crossing outside the Sogo department store. Over a million people are estimated to pass through Yee Wo Street each day.

The pedestrianised section of Paterson Street connects with Yee Wo Street opposite the branch of McDonald's, which moved there in 1984 from its original location inside the Hang Lung Centre on Paterson Street. Yee Wo Street is the sole access point for vehicular traffic entering Sugar Street; conversely, traffic emerging from Pennington Street can access Yee Wo Street, but not vice versa. The junctions with both roads are located beneath the iconic circular footbridge, and it is at this point that Yee Wo Street becomes one-way only, as it advances towards the Causeway Bay Terminus where it merges with Causeway Road.

Built in 1963 – and carrying the official identity of Footbridge No. HF85 – the bridge spans the junction above Sugar Street and Pennington Street with Yee Wo Street, and is decorated with oval-shaped reproductions of photographs of early 20th century Hong Kong, which are suspended from the ceiling – the image of Stone Nullah Lane is one of these.

Despite its striking form, the footbridge – which frequently features in photographic exhibitions, and has also appeared in several films – has no official name, and is variously referred to as "Yee Wo Street Footbridge", "Yee Wo Street Circular Pedestrian Bridge", and "Causeway Round Pedestrian Bridge". The bridge provides direct access to the Regal Hongkong Hotel and Lok Sing Building (the former headquarters of the China National Products Company).

Substantial parts of Yee Wo Street (including the area beneath the footbridge) were occupied by protesters during the Umbrella Revolution in 2014.

== History ==
Prior to being named, Yee Wo Street ran along the original coastline of Causeway Bay east of East Point, which was owned by Jardine, Matheson and Company, who dominated development of the area from 1841. In 1842, Jardine Matheson adopted the Chinese name, 怡和, /jy wɔ/ (transcribed as Ewo) which later became Yee Wo, and ultimately the name of the street. The shore along the street and East Point was later reclaimed. The street got its present name no later than 1889. Over time the street was straightened and widened, before acquiring its present form in the 1920s.

The street was renamed Kasuga-dori (春日通; Kasuga Street) during the Japanese occupation of Hong Kong. Following the surrender and evacuation of the Japanese army, the street reverted to its original name.

== Name ==
Yeewo was the Cantonese name of a Qing dynasty hong established by Wǔ Guóyíng (simplified Chinese: 五国莹; traditional Chinese: 伍國瑩) in Canton in 1783, who later became the leader of the cohong of the Thirteen Factories under the stewardship of Howqua, who took over in 1803. The name was later adopted by the trading company Jardine, Matheson & Co.

== See also ==
- List of streets and roads in Hong Kong
