= Wing On House =

Office building in Hong Kong

- 永安集團大廈
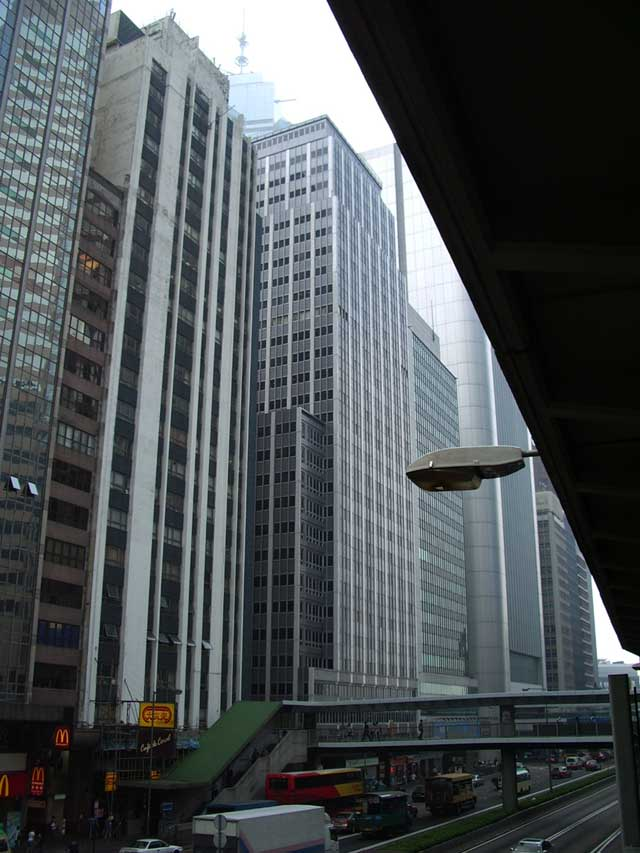
- Wing On House, Central, Hong Kong. (Building in the middle; the two buildings to the right are the old and new headquarters of Hang Seng Bank)

General information
- Status: Completed
- Type: Commercial offices
- Location: No. 71 Des Voeux Road Central, Central, Hong Kong
- Coordinates: 22°17′2.41″N 114°9′23.83″E
- Completed: 1967; 59 years ago

Height
- Roof: 91 m (299 ft)

Technical details
- Floor count: 31

Wing On House
- Traditional Chinese: 永安集團大廈
- Simplified Chinese: 永安集团大厦
Transcriptions
Standard Mandarin
- Hanyu Pinyin: Yǒng'ān Jítuán Dàshà
Yue: Cantonese
- Jyutping: wing5 on1 zaap6 tyun4 daai6 haa6

Wing On House (Chinese: 永安集團大廈) is a commercial building located at No. 71 Des Voeux Road Central, Central, Hong Kong.

== History ==
Upon its completion in 1967, it was Hong Kong's tallest commercial building, with 31 storeys. It held that distinction until 1971, when it was surpassed by Pearl City Mansion.

== Name ==
It is named after Wing On, a department stores and insurance conglomerate with a history dating back more than 100 years. Two other buildings along Des Voeux Road Central are also named after Wing On: Wing On Centre in Sheung Wan and Wing On Life Building in Central.

== Features ==
Each floor occupies around 11,000 square feet (1,000 m^{2}).

The building currently houses the Hong Kong Branch of Public Bank Berhad, The Law Society of Hong Kong, BOC Group Life Insurance and the local Consulate of Ghana as well as offices of Hang Seng Bank, whose old and new headquarters are next to Wing On House.

== See also ==
- List of buildings and structures in Hong Kong

Preceded by Wu Sang House	Tallest Building in Hong Kong; 1967 – 1971	Succeeded by Pearl City Mansion
