= Jardine's Bazaar =

Road in Causeway Bay, Hong Kong

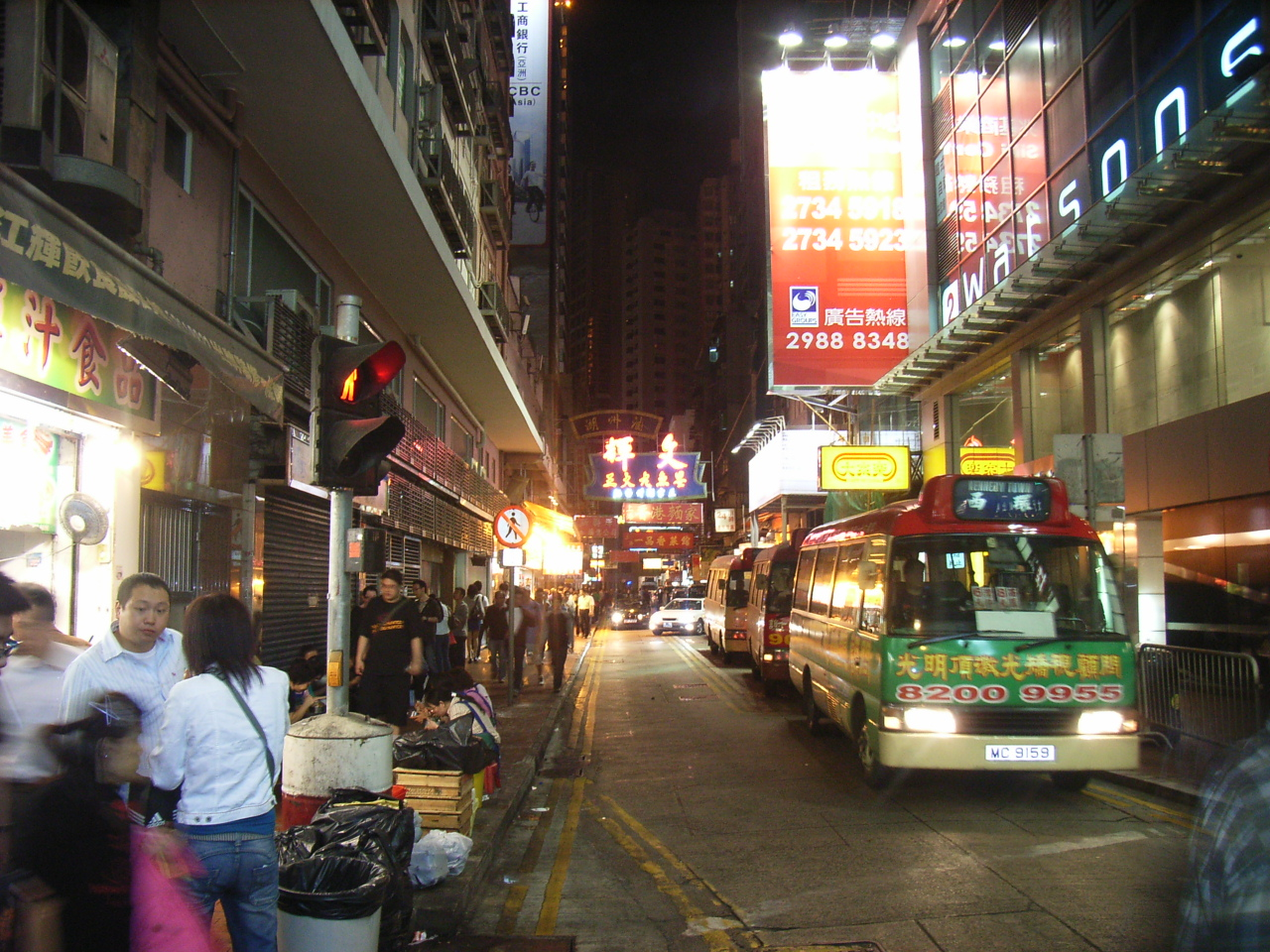
- Jardine's Bazaar at night
- Interactive map of Jardine's Bazaar
- Native name: 渣甸街 (Yue Chinese)
- Namesake: William Jardine
- Location: Causeway Bay, Hong Kong
- Coordinates: 22°16′46.78″N 114°11′6.14″E

Jardine's Bazaar
- Chinese: 渣甸街
- Literal meaning: 'Jardine Street'
Transcriptions
Standard Mandarin
- Hanyu Pinyin: Zhādiàn jiē
- Wade–Giles: Cha^{1}-tien^{4} chieh^{1}
- IPA: [ʈʂá.tjɛ̂n tɕjé]
Yue: Cantonese
- Yale Romanization: Jādīn gāai
- Jyutping: zaa1 din1 gaai1
- IPA: [tsa˥.tin˥ kaj˥]

Jardine's Bazaar (Chinese: 渣甸街; Cantonese Yale: Jādīn gāai) is a one-way road located in Causeway Bay, Hong Kong. It begins at the junction of Irving Street and Pennington Street, and ends at the junction of Yee Wo Street and Hennessy Road, directly opposite the Sogo department store.

Historically, the road was the location of a bazaar named for William Jardine; it is one of the oldest shopping streets in Hong Kong, dating back to at least 1845.

== See also ==
- List of streets and roads in Hong Kong
