= Paterson Street =

Street in Hong Kong

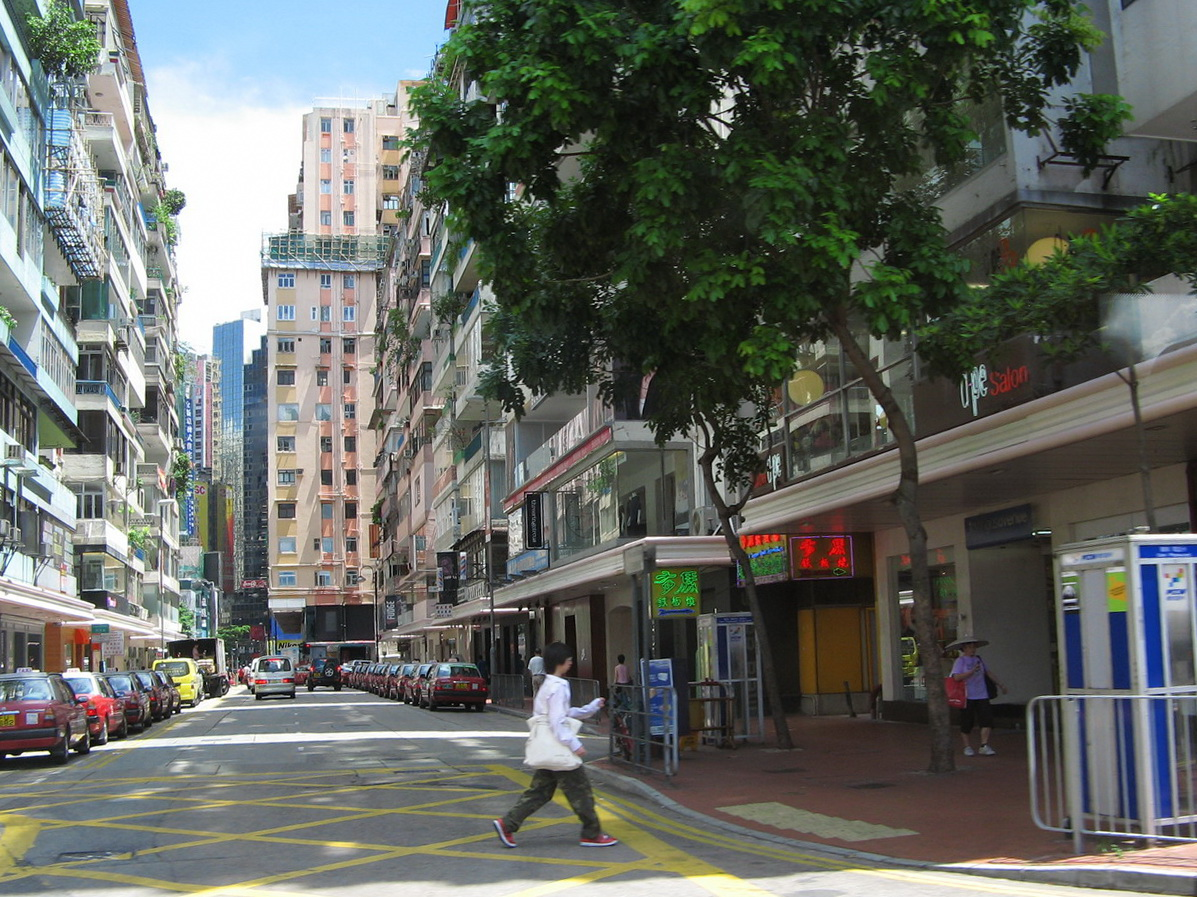
Paterson Street looking south towards the junction with Great George Street in July 2007

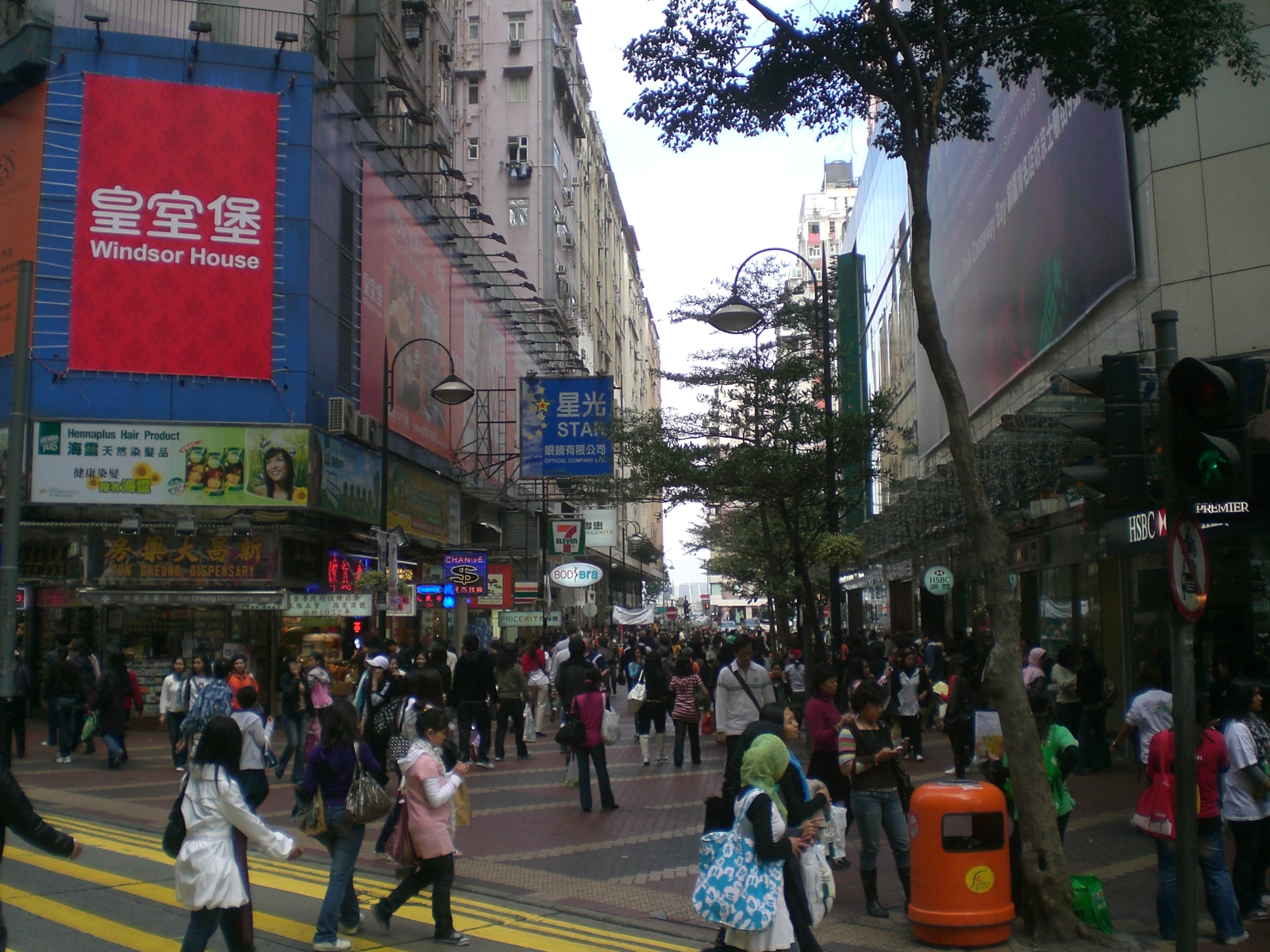
The southern tip of Paterson Street, as seen from Yee Wo Street in December 2008

Paterson Street (Chinese: 百德新街) is a one-way road in Causeway Bay, Hong Kong Island. It begins in the north at the T-junction with Gloucester Road (directly opposite the Caltex petrol station), and intersects with Kingston Street and Great George Street before ending as a pedestrian street which intersects with Yee Wo Street in the south.

The street was named after John Johnstone Paterson, a taipan of Jardine Matheson & Co., and a member of the Executive Council and Legislative Council of Hong Kong.

The fast food chain McDonald's opened its first branch in Hong Kong on 8 January 1975 in the Hang Lung Centre on the corner of Paterson Street and Great George Street. The branch relocated to Yee Wo Street in 1984, where it has remained ever since.

In the 1990s, the southernmost section of Paterson Street between Great George Street and Yee Wo Street was restricted to buses. It then became a weekend pedestrian zone on a trial basis in December 1999, before becoming fully pedestrianised in July 2000.

== See also ==
- List of streets and roads in Hong Kong
