= Hennessy Road =

Thoroughfare in Wan Chai, Hong Kong

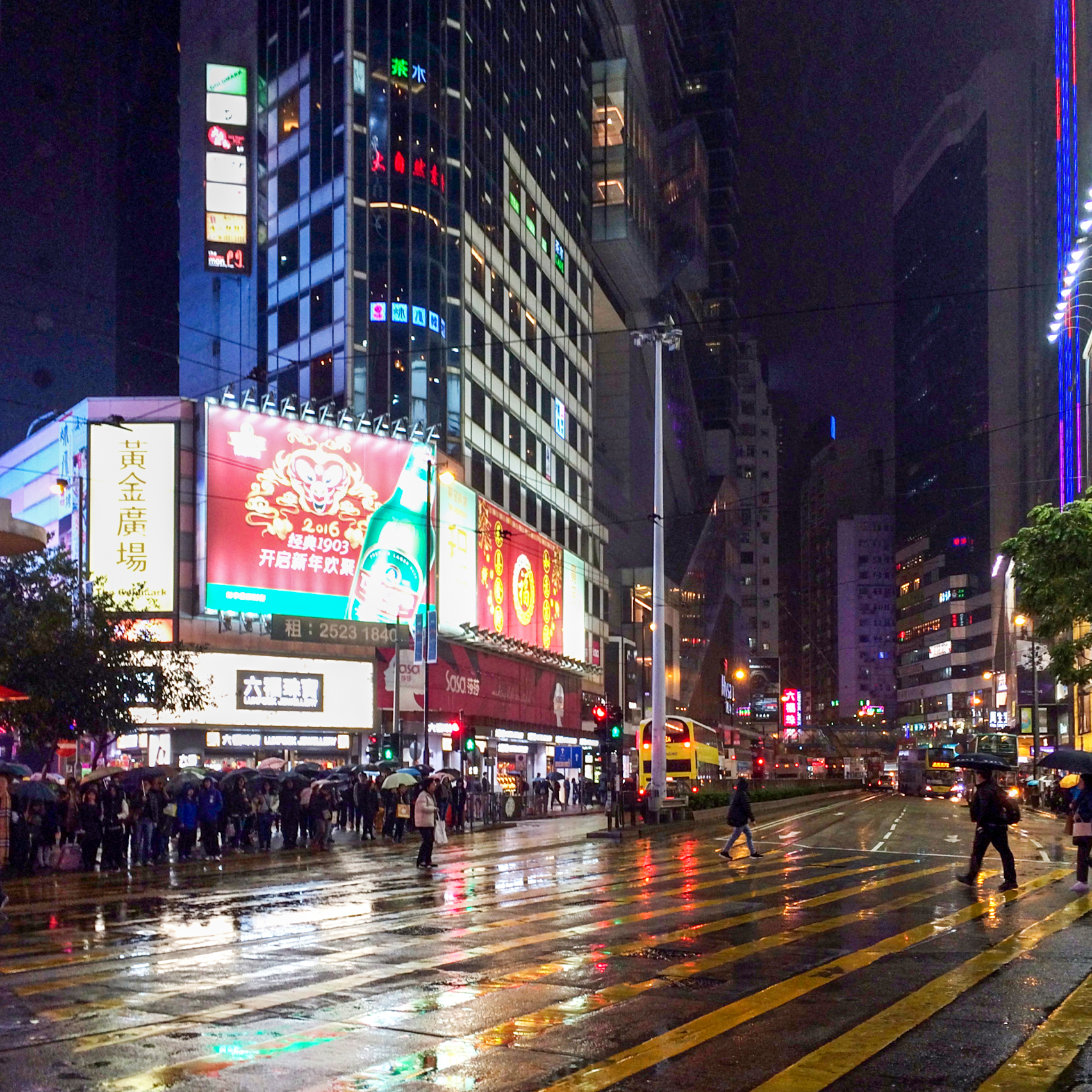
- Hennessy Road in Causeway Bay, junction with Yee Wo Street in February 2016
- Interactive map of Hennessy Road
- Native name: 軒尼詩道 (Yue Chinese)
- Namesake: John Pope Hennessy
- Length: 1.86 kilometres (1.16 mi)
- Location: Wan Chai, Hong Kong
- Coordinates: 22°16′40″N 114°10′21″E
- East end: Yee Wo Street
- West end: Queensway

Hennessy Road
- Traditional Chinese: 軒尼詩道
- Simplified Chinese: 轩尼诗道
- Cantonese Yale: Hīn nèih sī douh
Transcriptions
Standard Mandarin
- Hanyu Pinyin: Xuānníshīdào
Yue: Cantonese
- Yale Romanization: Hīn nèih sī douh
- Jyutping: Hin^{1} nei^{4} si^{1} dou^{6}

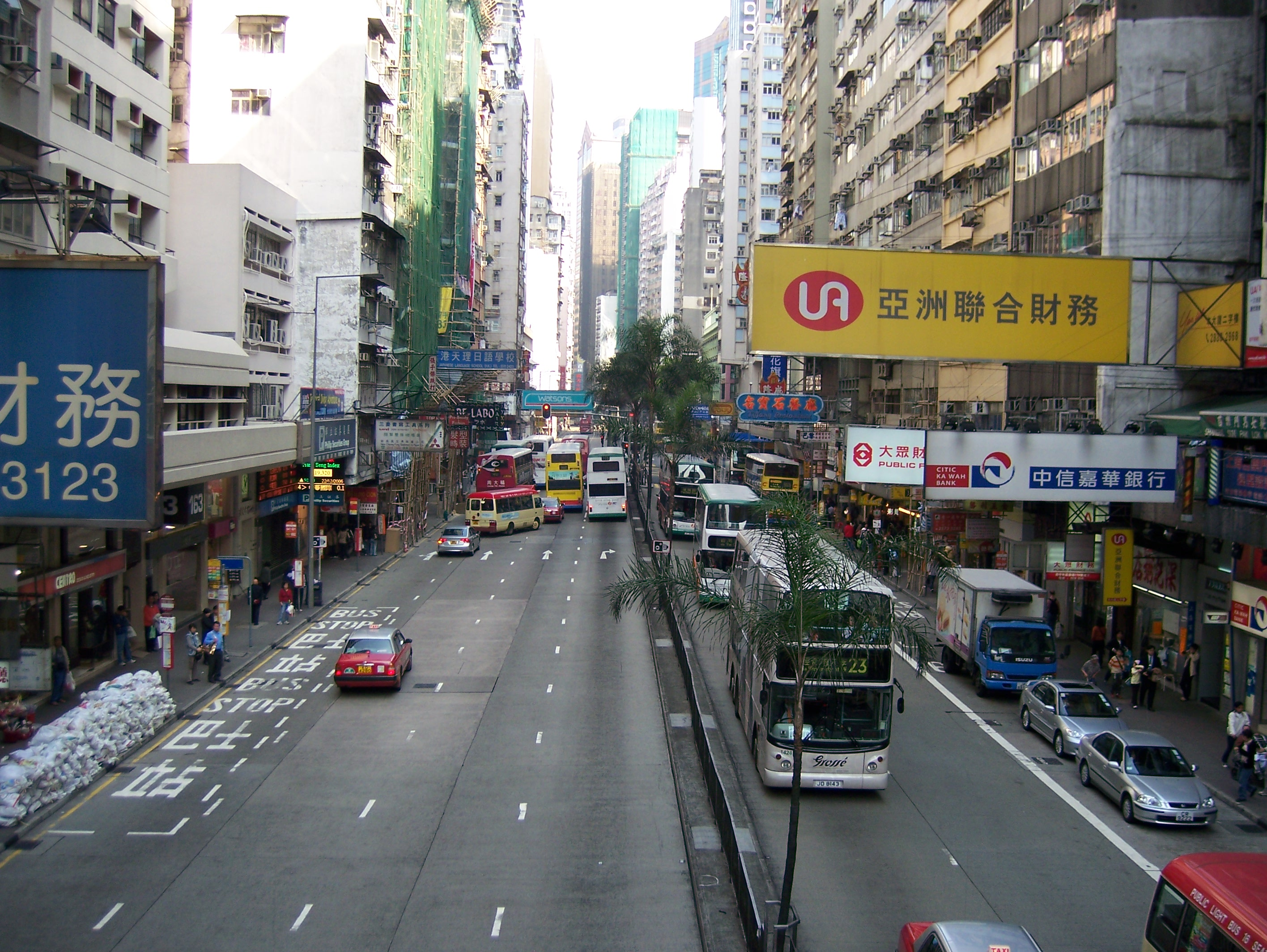
Hennessy Road in Wan Chai in December 2006

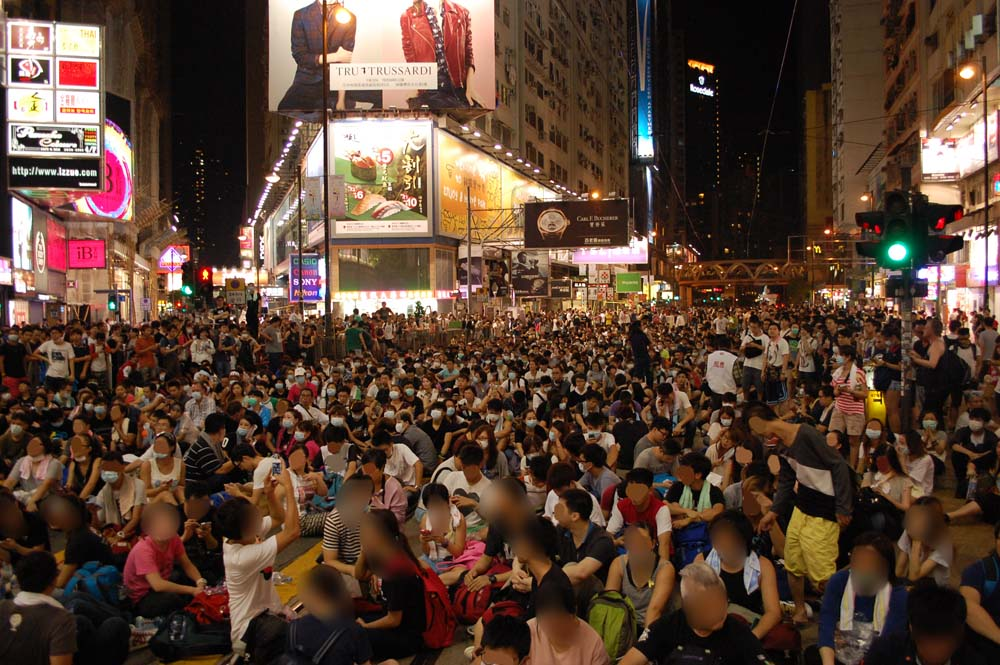
2014 Hong Kong protests

Hennessy Road (Chinese: 軒尼詩道) is a major thoroughfare on Hong Kong Island.

Built in 1929 on land reclaimed through the Praya Reclamation Scheme, it is named after John Pope Hennessy, the Governor of Hong Kong between 1877 and 1882.

The road is 1.86 kilometres (1.16 mi) in length, and connects Queensway in the west with Yee Wo Street in the east, where it intersects with East Point Road, Jardine's Bazaar, and Great George Street in East Point.

For most of its length, it is a four-lane road carrying road traffic and trams in both directions.

Due to heavy congestion during peak hours, long haul bus routes are not routed through the road.

The portion of the road passing through Causeway Bay was one of the locations occupied during the 2014 Hong Kong protests.

== In popular culture ==
The 2010 Hong Kong movie Crossing Hennessy is a love story set around Hennessy Road. The protagonists, Oi Lin (played by Tang Wei) and Loy (played by Jacky Cheung) live on opposite sides of Hennessy Road.

== Landmarks ==
- Sogo Hong Kong – iconic department store opened in May 1985
- Hysan Place – shopping mall and office building developed by Hysan Development Company Limited, and opened on the former site of the Hennessy Centre in August 2012.

== See also ==
- Southorn Playground
- List of streets and roads in Hong Kong
