= Sogo Hong Kong =

Hong Kong department store

Sogo Hong Kong 崇光香港百貨
- Type: Private
- Industry: Retail
- Founded: 31 May 1985; 41 years ago
- Founder: Ihei Sogo
- Headquarters: 555 Hennessy Road, Causeway Bay, Hong Kong
- Area served: Hong Kong and mainland China
- Key people: Thomas Lau (Chairman, CEO)
- Parent: Lifestyle International Holdings
- Website: Sogo Hong Kong Company Limited

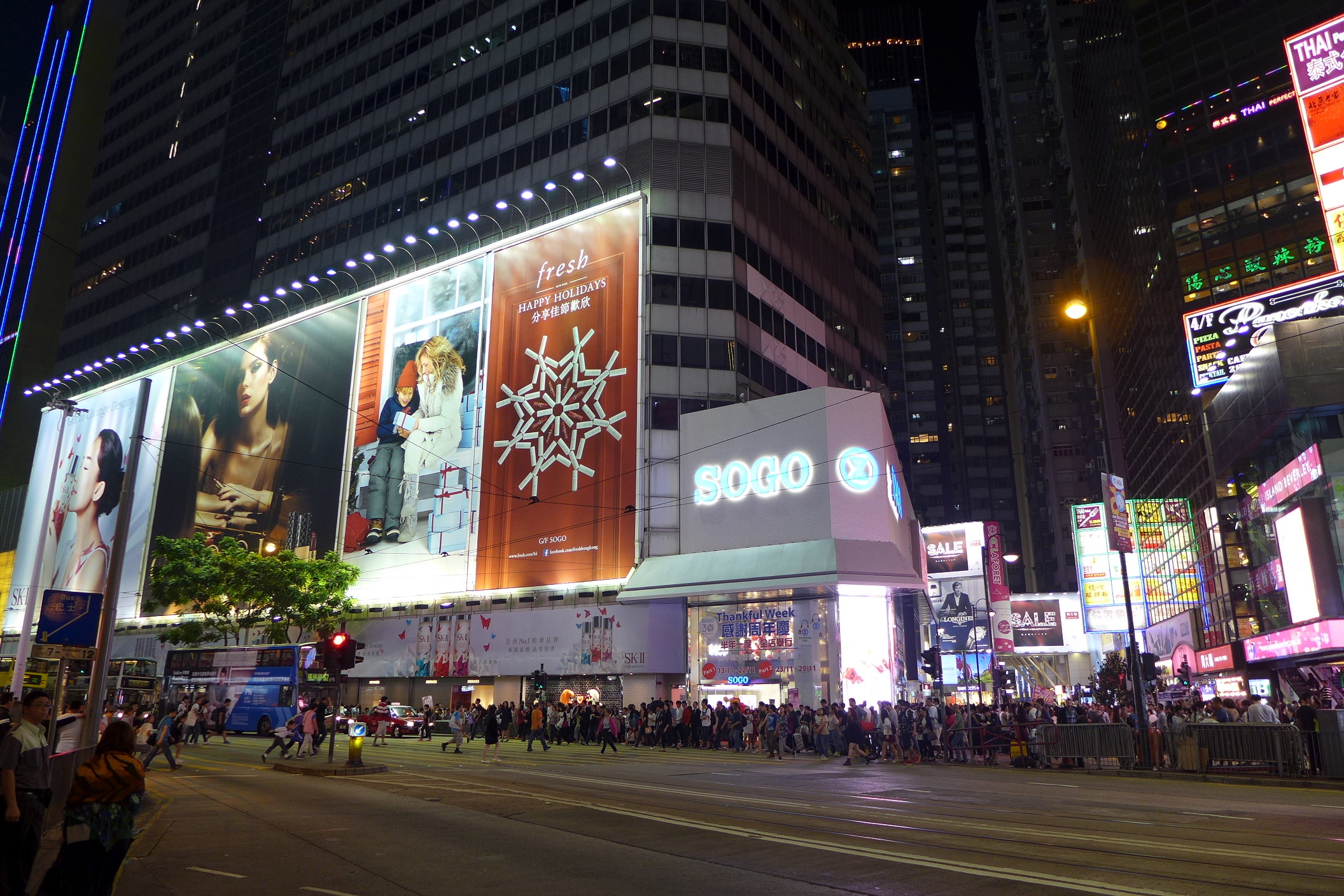
Evening view of Sogo Causeway Bay

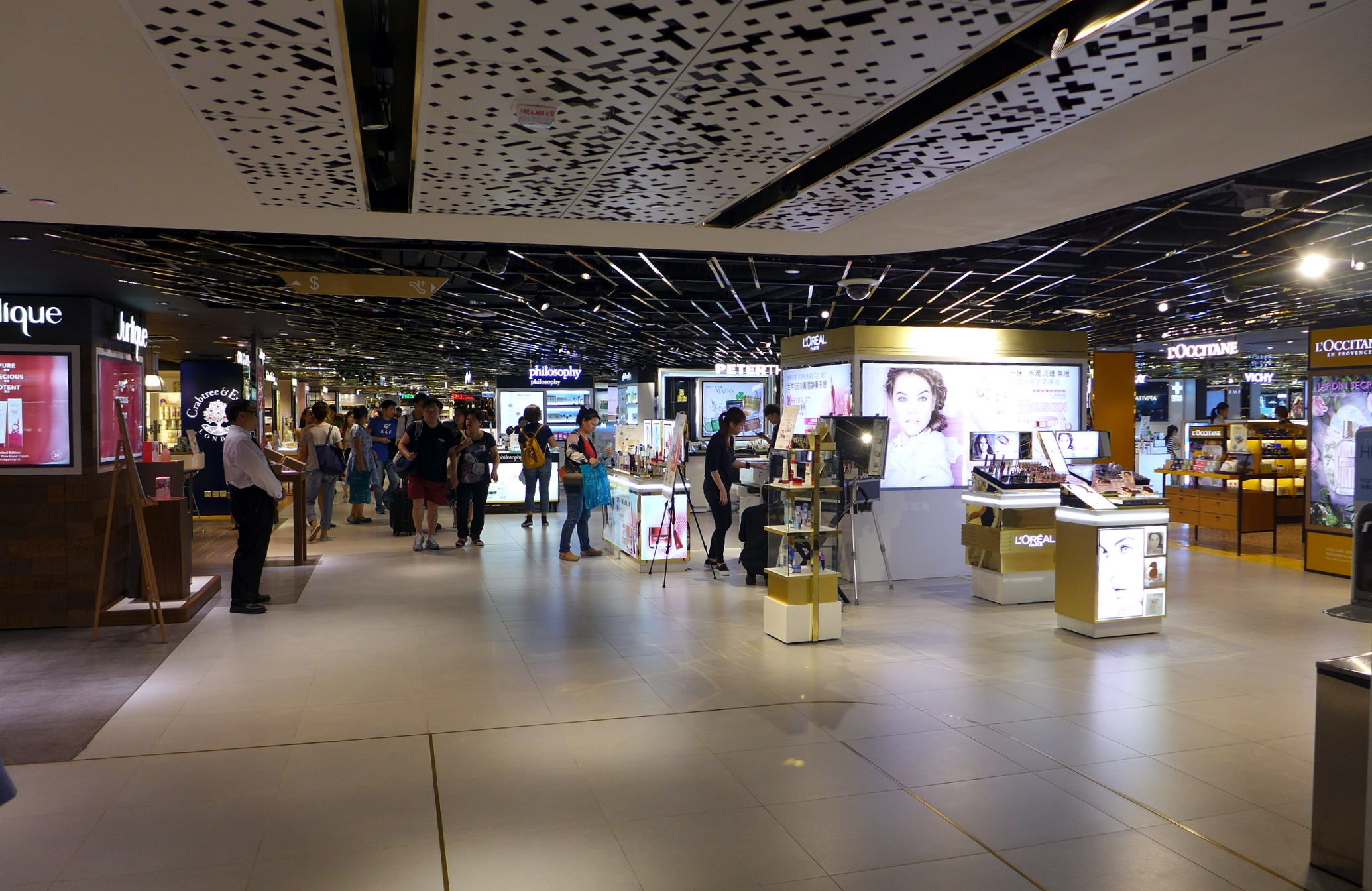
Sogo Tsim Sha Tsui

Sogo Hong Kong (Chinese: 香港崇光百貨) is one of Hong Kong's largest department stores. First established by Japanese retailers, Sogo Co., Ltd. (Japanese: 株式会社そごう), the department store is now owned by Lifestyle International Holdings (SEHK: 1212). In addition to the new flagship store in Kai Tak, Sogo Hong Kong operates a second store in Causeway Bay. Sogo Hong Kong has been a member of the International Association of Department Stores since 2013.

== History ==
In April 1984, the Causeway Bay station construction site was sold by the Mass Transit Railway Corporation to Taisei Corporation for $380m. Following construction, Sogo Hong Kong, originally parented by Sogo Japan (Japanese: そごう), commenced its operations on 31 May 1985 in Causeway Bay, Hong Kong. Situated on Hennessy Road, the Japanese styled department store has become an important retail landmark of Hong Kong. In 1993, it underwent major renovations to become "Jumbo SOGO", expanding its area from 11,000 square metres (120,000 sq ft) to 40,000 square metres (430,000 sq ft).

In 2000, Japan's Sogo declared bankruptcy under a US$17 billion debt. The Hong Kong store was subsequently acquired by Lifestyle International Holdings.

In 2005, Sogo Hong Kong opened a second store in Tsim Sha Tsui, Kowloon. It was located underground, below Salisbury Road. The location was formerly the site of The Palace Mall (1997-2001) and Teddy Bear Kingdom (2002-2005). In 2014, Sogo relocated across Salisbury Road next to Sheraton Hong Kong, encompassing a total floor area of 13,000 square metres (140,000 sq ft). This location closed on 12 March 2023 amid plans for relocation to Kai Tak. The new location opened 15 November 2024.

== Business ==
Sogo Hong Kong's flagship Kai Tak store is spread across nine floors of retail space. The store carries mid to high-end clothing brands, sports wear, children's wear, cosmetics, appliances, bedding, and housewares. Sogo Hong Kong also operates the popular Japanese supermarket, Freshmart.

== Buildings, lands, and fire safety violations ==
Sogo's Causeway Bay store is located in a building called East Point Centre, which consists of an "Old Wing" and a "New Wing". The 11th to 16th floors of the New Wing were renovated around 2004 in order to expand the department store's retail space. Several legal irregularities surrounding these floors have been uncovered.

In 2021, Hong Kong investigative news agency FactWire reported that Sogo's use of the upper storeys of the New Wing was unauthorised by the lands and buildings authorities. The building's Deed of Mutual Covenant designates the 12th to 16th floors as office areas, whereas in reality these floors are now used as part of the department store. In addition, drawings that Sogo submitted to the Buildings Department in 2004, prior to the renovation, marked the 11th to 16th floors of the New Wing as offices. The 11th floor is, in reality, also part of the department store. FactWire also discovered apparent violations of fire codes, with egress routes and dimensions not meeting safety requirements.

In addition, the news agency noted that the 11th to 16th floors of the New Wing had been registered as clubs under the Clubs (Safety of Premises) Ordinance since 2005. The 11th floor is licensed as "Sogo Book Club", while the 12th to 16th floors are licensed as "Sogo Club". According to the law, only members and their guests have a right to use licensed clubhouses. However, until 2021 (when Sogo was contacted by FactWire), the clubhouse levels were open to the public. A cafeteria on the 11th floor operated without a restaurant licence, which is permitted because the space is registered as a clubhouse. In addition, the clubhouse designation could allow Sogo to reduce their profits tax liability. Sogo did not comment on whether or not the company had applied for tax exemptions on the basis of the clubhouse licence.

== Thankful Week ==
Sogo's "Thankful Week" is as a semi-annual period in which many of Sogo's brands hold special promotions, often offering steep discounts to their products. Similar to Black Friday, the event is considered a cultural phenomenon among local shoppers and tourists alike.
