= Leung Kin-fai =

Perpetrator of the 1 July police stabbing

- 梁健輝
- Leung was seen bleeding after stabbing himself following the attack on a police officer
- Born: 1971; Hong Kong
- Died: 1 July 2021 (aged 49–50); Ruttonjee Hospital, Hong Kong
- Cause of death: Suicide
- Known for: 1 July police stabbing

Leung Kin-fai
- Traditional Chinese: 梁健輝
- Simplified Chinese: 梁健辉
Transcriptions
Standard Mandarin
- Hanyu Pinyin: Liáng Jiànhuī
Yue: Cantonese
- Jyutping: loeng4 gin6 fai1

Leung Kin-fai (Chinese: 梁健輝; 1971 – 1 July 2021) was a Hong Kong merchandiser known for stabbing a 29-year-old police officer in Causeway Bay and committing suicide immediately afterwards. The attack took place on a day when three anniversaries converged – the anniversary of the territory's handover from British to Chinese rule, the 100th Anniversary of the Chinese Communist Party, one year (and a day) after the imposition of the Hong Kong national security law.

Leung's death resulted in a sharp fall of the share price of his employer, Vitasoy; expressions of sympathy for Leung and public mourning of his demise in Hong Kong were declared tantamount to supporting terrorism by the government of Carrie Lam. As a result of criticism of a students' union motion at the University of Hong Kong that expressed "deep sadness" at the death of Leung, and appreciation of his "actions", members of its council resigned and 32 students were excluded from the university by the governing council; dissenting from the rationale for exclusion, Eric Cheung, the principal lecturer of the law faculty tendered his resignation from the council. Four student leaders were later arrested on suspicion of violations of the national security law.

== Career ==
Leung worked at Apple Daily as an information officer for several months in 2008, and in 2016 joined Vitasoy, where he worked as director of purchasing department until his death.

== Death ==
At 22:05 on 1 July 2021, Leung approached from behind and stabbed an officer of the Police Tactical Unit using a knife in Causeway Bay, Hong Kong, then committed suicide by stabbing himself in the heart. Leung was immediately subdued by surrounding police, arrested and sent to hospital. He died at 23:20. The police officer was rushed to hospital in a critical condition but survived.

On his person was a USB drive where Leung had left suicide notes alleging that the police had harboured criminals, committed atrocities, and said that there was a lack of checks and balances under the system. He also expressed discontent at the lack of freedom after the implementation of the Hong Kong national security law and its ramifications on the course of democratic development in Hong Kong. The incident was classed as attempted murder and an act of terrorism by a person acting alone. Police said that a computer seized from the attacker's home indicated that he had been "radicalised". The police said that they also seized a large number of leaflets opposed to the 2019 Hong Kong extradition bill, suggesting that his action was motivated by hatred towards the police.

== Reactions ==
After Leung died on 1 July 2021, Vitasoy said in an internal notice that Leung "unfortunately passed away", and "we extend our deepest condolences to Leung's family".

The shares of Vitasoy, which are listed on the Hong Kong Stock Exchange, fell sharply on the day of the announcement, after Mainland Chinese social media users on Weibo called for a boycott of its products. Shares closed down by 14.6%, the biggest single-day drop since its listing in 1994 to reach HK$26 – the lowest level since April 2020. Some mainland celebrities, namely Gong Jun and Ren Jialun, terminated their endorsement agreements with the company. The Mainland Chinese market accounting for two-thirds of the company's revenues, Vitasoy disowned the memorandum and issued a public apology saying that it was highly inappropriate and was not approved by the firm. The company said that the notice had been issued by a staff member from the personnel department who would be disciplined and may face legal action. Some Hong Kong internet users expressed strong dissatisfaction with Vitasoy's reaction.

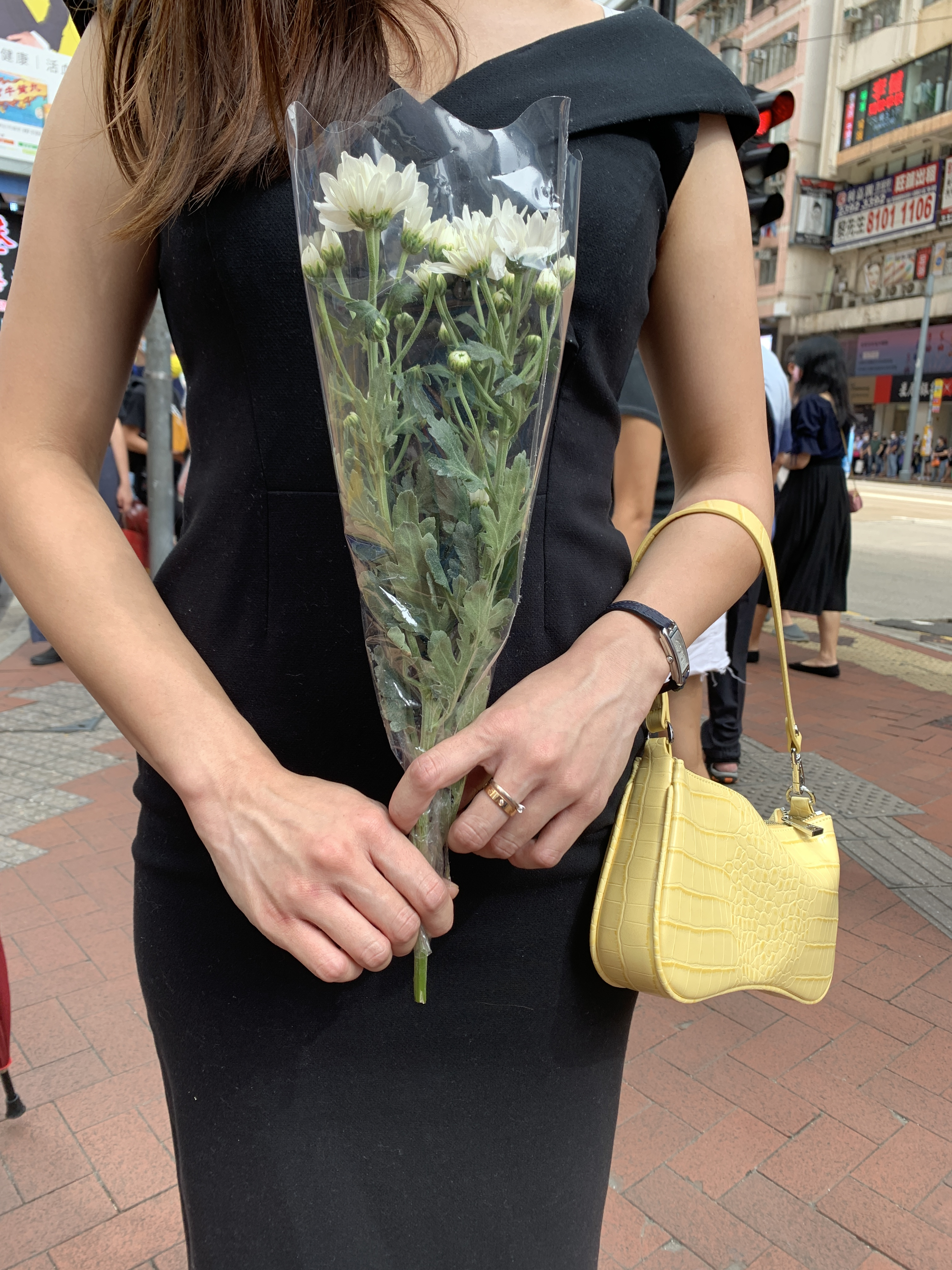
A woman holding flowers to pay tribute to Leung on 2 July, after his death.

For several days in a row, up until the seventh day, members of the public gathered in front of the Sogo department store in Causeway Bay to mourn Leung. Many wore the black shirts that had become the de facto uniform of 2019–2020 anti-government protesters, bringing white flowers, lighting joss sticks and candles. A large number of police arrived, patrolled in groups, stopped and searched citizens nearby and attempted to deter and disperse them. The Hong Kong Police warned that advocating for people to mourn for the attacker was no different from "supporting terrorism" and criticised parents who took children to mourn for him. Police said that mourning the individual was an attempt "to glorify, romanticise, make heroic and even rationalise the blatant violence of the attacker", and could be in breach of the national security law.

On 7 July, the students' union of the University of Hong Kong passed a motion which expressed "deep sadness" at the death of Leung, and appreciation of his "sacrifice", which the Security Bureau condemned as "no different from supporting and encouraging terrorism". Arthur Li, chairman of the governing council of the university, said that the motion was "indecent and not acceptable". The executive committee of the students' union apologised for the motion on 9 July, and stepped down from their posts. On 13 July the university de-recognised the student union and said it would "take further action" against students involved in the matter; Chief Executive Carrie Lam described the motion as "shameful". On 16 July, the police national security unit raided an office of the students' union, as well as the headquarters of the university student media outlet, and on 4 August the council of the university banned from the university all 32 students who had attended the union meeting, and prohibited them from using any of its facilities and services. Eric Cheung Tat-ming, principal lecturer at the University of Hong Kong Faculty of Law, dissented from the justification of the ban, and immediately resigned from the council. On 18 August, four student leaders were arrested by national security police, three of them over allegedly advocating terrorism.

In late August, Vitasoy asked its employees to agree to the collection of highly personal nature such as names and details of family members, including memberships or affiliation of associations and different organisations, failing which the company might not be able to pay workers. Vitasoy said that such data would be handed over to law enforcement departments if required. While the company said that the information was necessary as a result of a computer system upgrade and to ensure compliance, staff unions declared the move highly unusual and questioned the relevance of the information to the exercise of Vitasoy's duties as an employer.

The victim of Leung's attack survived the stabbing and gave an interview to the South China Morning Post. In it, he said that he could not forgive "a man who thought he could evade responsibility by committing suicide", as that sent a wrong message to society, and that his message to Leung was that he believed violence was wrong and is never the solution.
