= 1 July police stabbing =

2021 suicide attack in Hong Kong

- Part of Hong Kong–Mainland China conflict
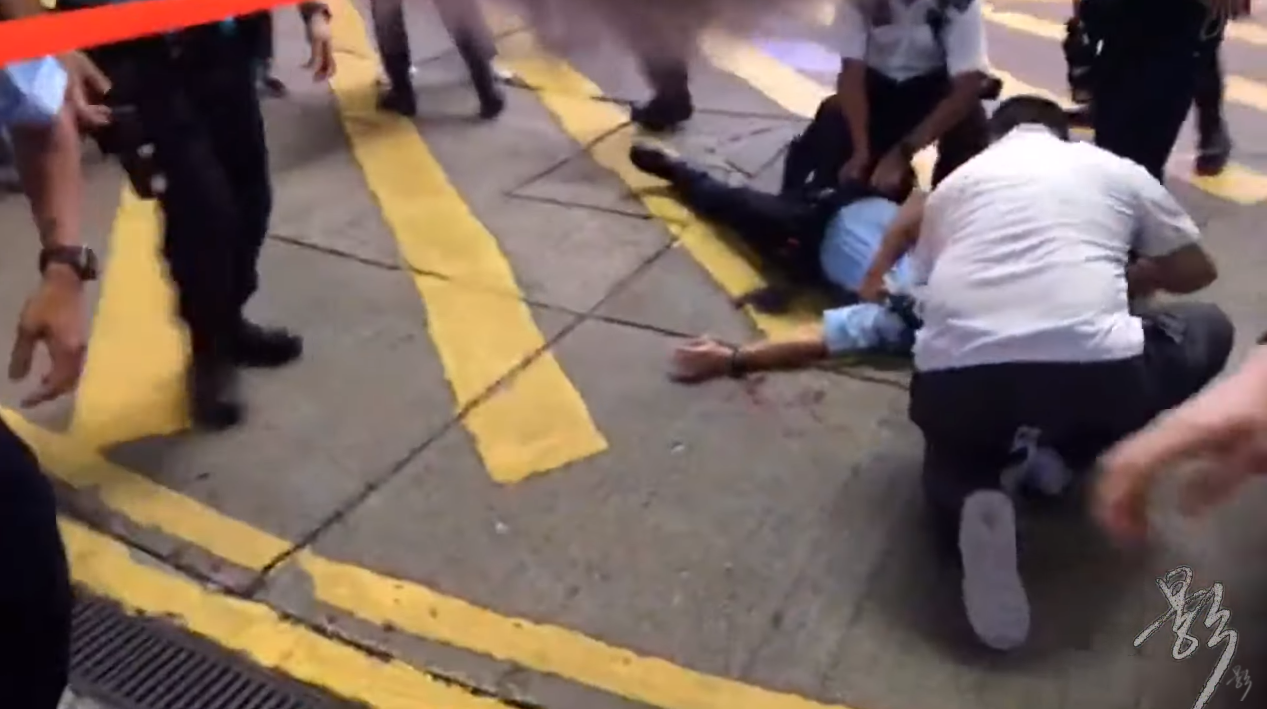
- Stabbed police officer lying on the ground and receiving first aid
- Location: Causeway Bay, Hong Kong
- Date: 1 July 2021; ~22:10 (UTC+08:00)
- Target: Police officer on duty
- Attack type: Suicide attack
- Weapon: Knife
- Deaths: 1
- Injuries: 1
- Perpetrator: Leung Kin-fai

A suicide attack took place at approximately 22:10 on 1 July 2021, in Causeway Bay, Hong Kong. 50-year-old Leung Kin-fai approached a Police Tactical Unit police officer from behind and stabbed him, injuring the officer's scapula and piercing his lung, before Leung committed suicide by stabbing his own heart. Leung was immediately subdued by surrounding police officers, who arrested him and sent him to a hospital. He died at 23:20.

The stabbed police officer underwent seven hours of surgery in the emergency room while his family was told they needed to prepare themselves for the worst. The constable survived and learned two days after the attack, that his attacker had already committed suicide. In the aftermath, he said he will never forgive someone who believe they can "evade responsibility" by committing suicide and stated that, "this conveys a very wrong message to society, that one can conclude matters by ending one's own life after doing bad things. Violence cannot solve a problem. Violence is never a solution. These are my words to him."

The attack occurred on the anniversary of the handover of Hong Kong in 1997 – a public holiday in Hong Kong. Suspected motives of the perpetrator include dissatisfaction with the Hong Kong police, whom he accused of "sheltering criminals", and opposition to the implementation of the Hong Kong national security law and its ramifications on the course of democratic development in Hong Kong. The Hong Kong government characterised the attack as an act of terrorism.

Some Hong Kong netizens called Leung a "martyr" and "brave". Some citizens went to the attack site to lay flowers and bow. Police strongly condemned the mourning and while it did not declare the laying of flowers to mourn the attacker to be illegal, it did not recommend "these so-called mourning rituals" and stated that encouraging such memorials of Leung was "no different from supporting terrorism". It said that some parents had brought young children to mourn, and had intended to "beautify, romanticize, heroize and even rationalize the murderer's cold-blooded act of attempting to kill."

== Incident ==
Approximately at 22:10, Leung Kin-fai, a 50-year-old man who was dressed in black and wearing a backpack suddenly raised a knife and stabbed a 28-year-old Police Tactical Unit police officer's back from behind outside Causeway Bay Sogo, causing the officer to fall on the ground. The suspect inserted the knife to his own chest shortly after. His heart position was bleeding. Immediately, he was subdued to ground by five to six police officers. He died at 23:20 after being sent to Ruttonjee Hospital for rescue. According to reporters and eyewitnesses on site, the police officer bled heavily after being stabbed. There was also a lot of blood near the subdued assailant. The attack was filmed and live-streamed by a reporter from Secret China, a Chinese-language media outlet from the United States.

The police said the injured police officer was from East Kowloon Police Tactical Unit. His scapula was injured and his lung was pierced. After an emergency operation at Queen Mary Hospital, his condition improved from critical to serious the next morning. The police classified the incident as an attempted murder and suicide.

After the officer fell on the ground, three nearby police officers drew their guns. At the same time, a large number of officers arrived at the scene and sealed off East Point Road, driving away citizens and reporters. The new Commissioner of Police Raymond Siu came to the scene to be briefed about the incident. Police officers collected evidence on site afterwards and found a fruit knife and a sabre. At approximately 23:20, police officers stopped and searched a woman near the scene of the assault and found a utility knife on her body. She was shackled and taken to a police car. Later, a man was also taken on the police car with his head covered by black cloth.

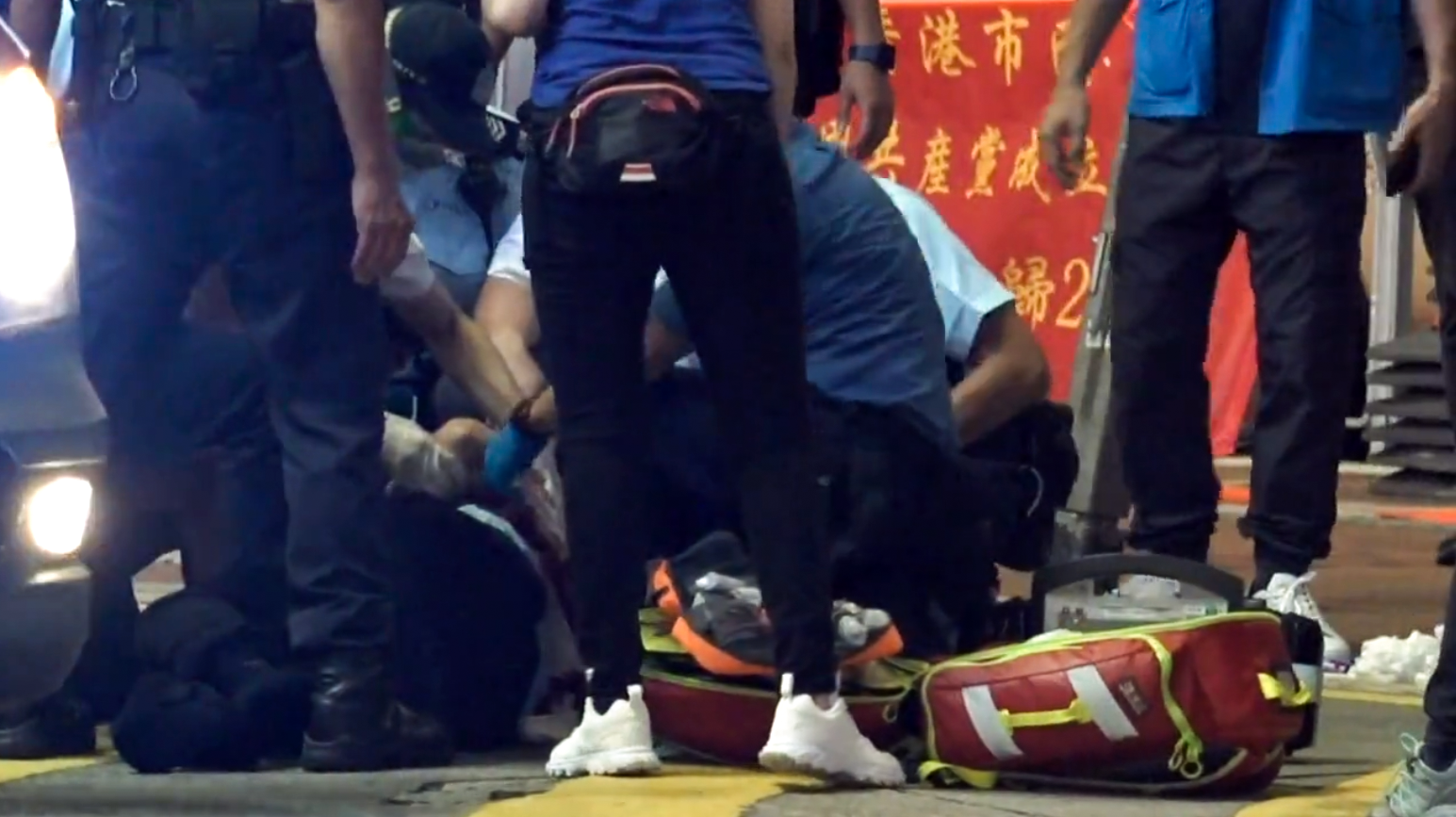
Paramedics attending to stabbed police officer

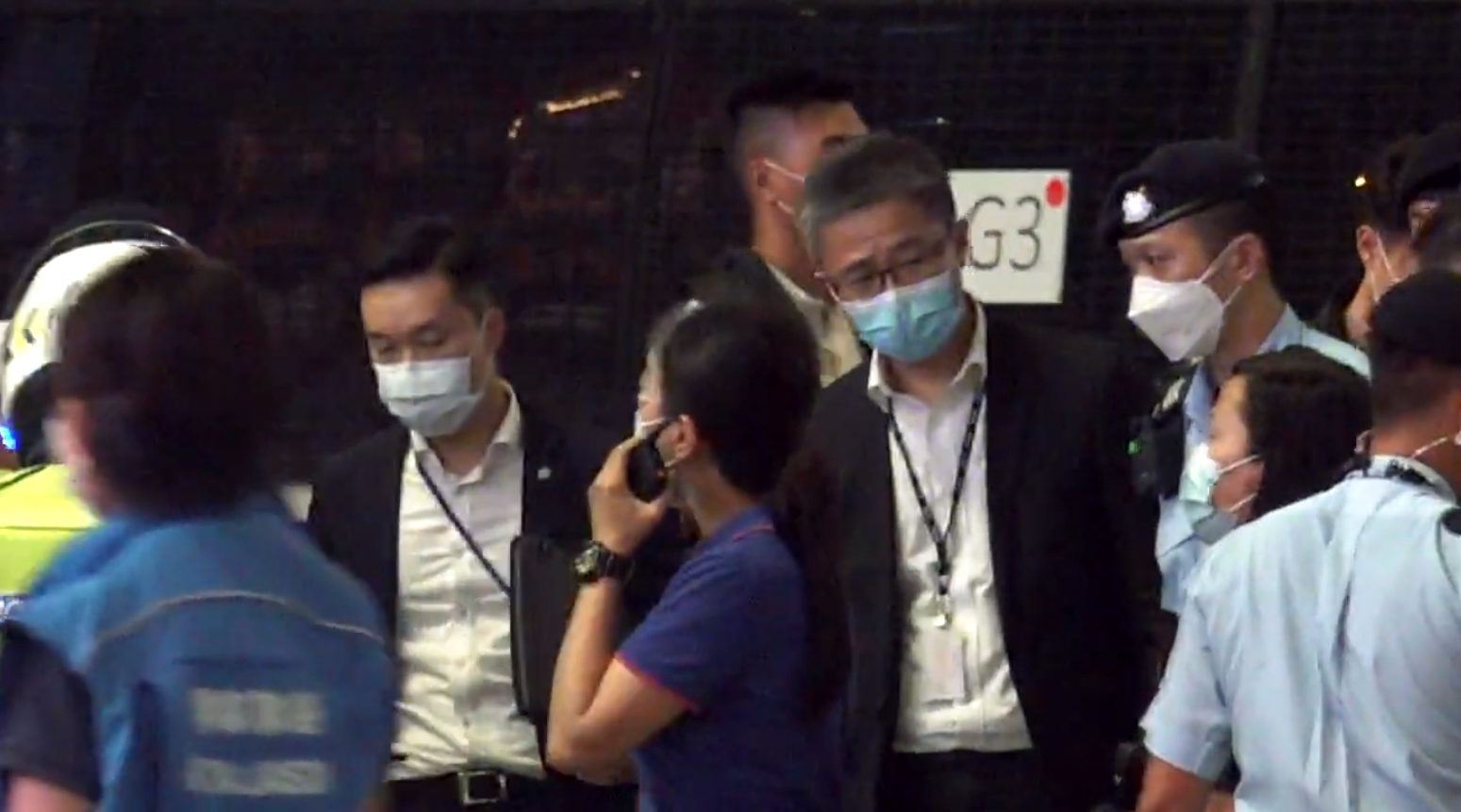
Commissioner of Police Raymond Siu coming to the scene to understand the incident

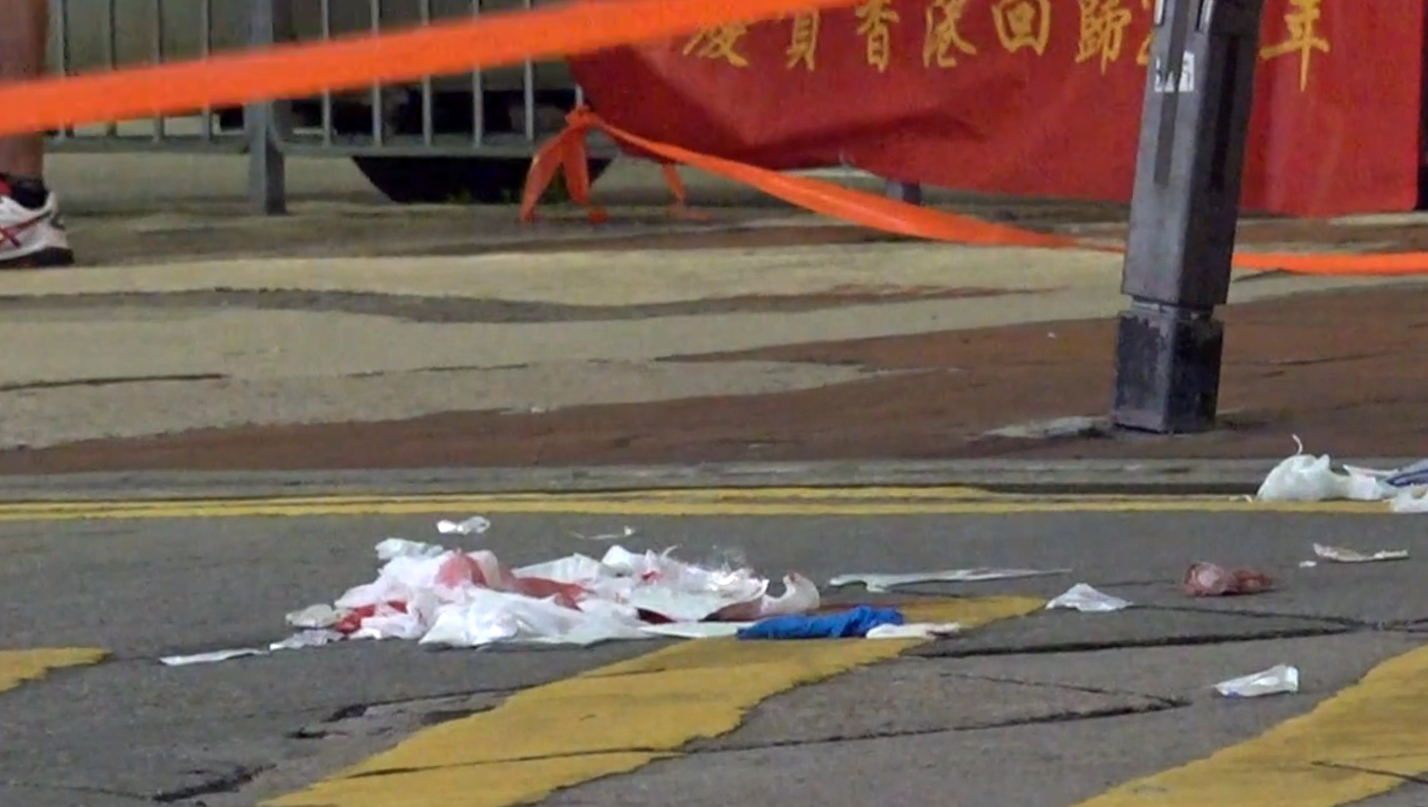
Blood on the ground at the attack site

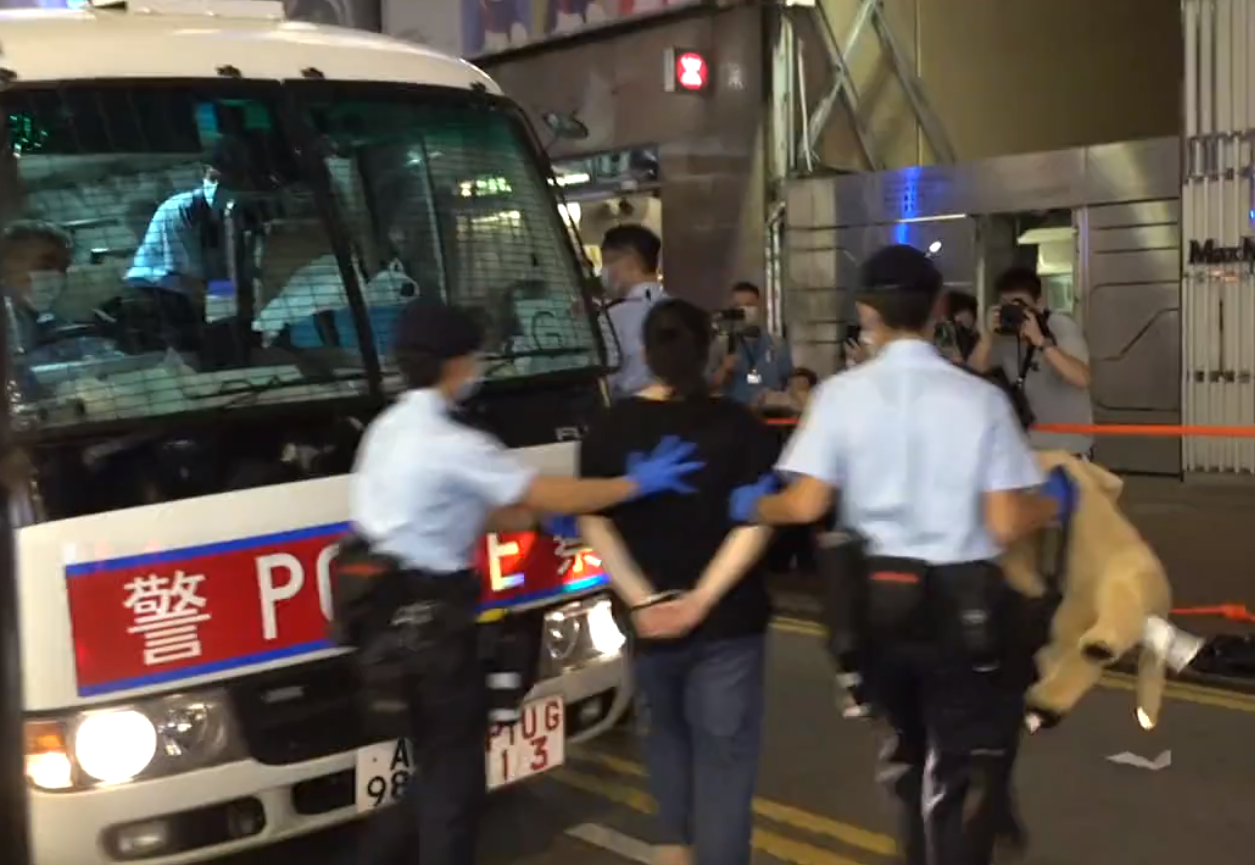
Police officers taking a woman on a police car after finding a utility knife on her body

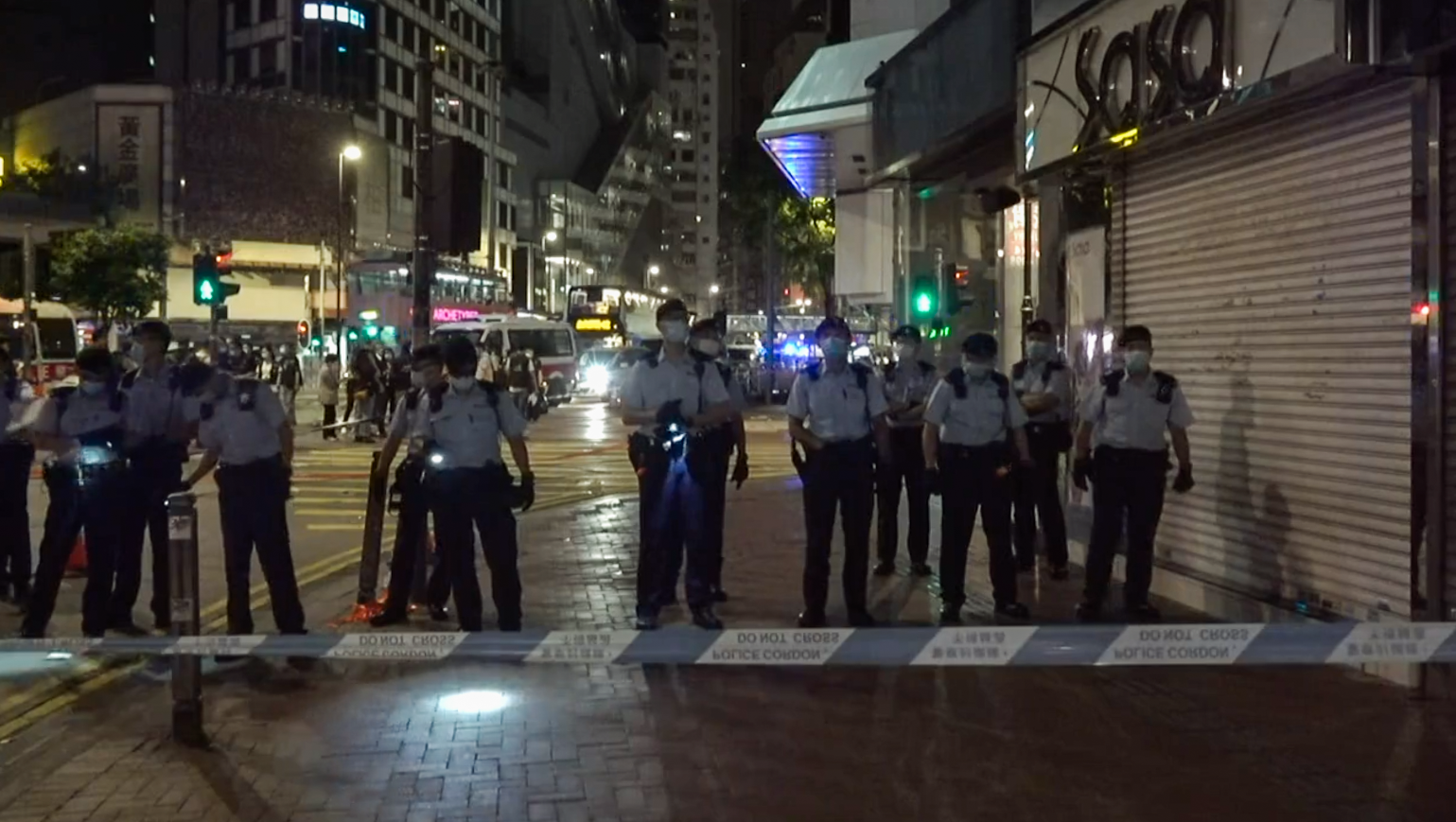
Tactical unit police officers conducting a carpet search near the scene of the attack at midnight

== Investigation ==
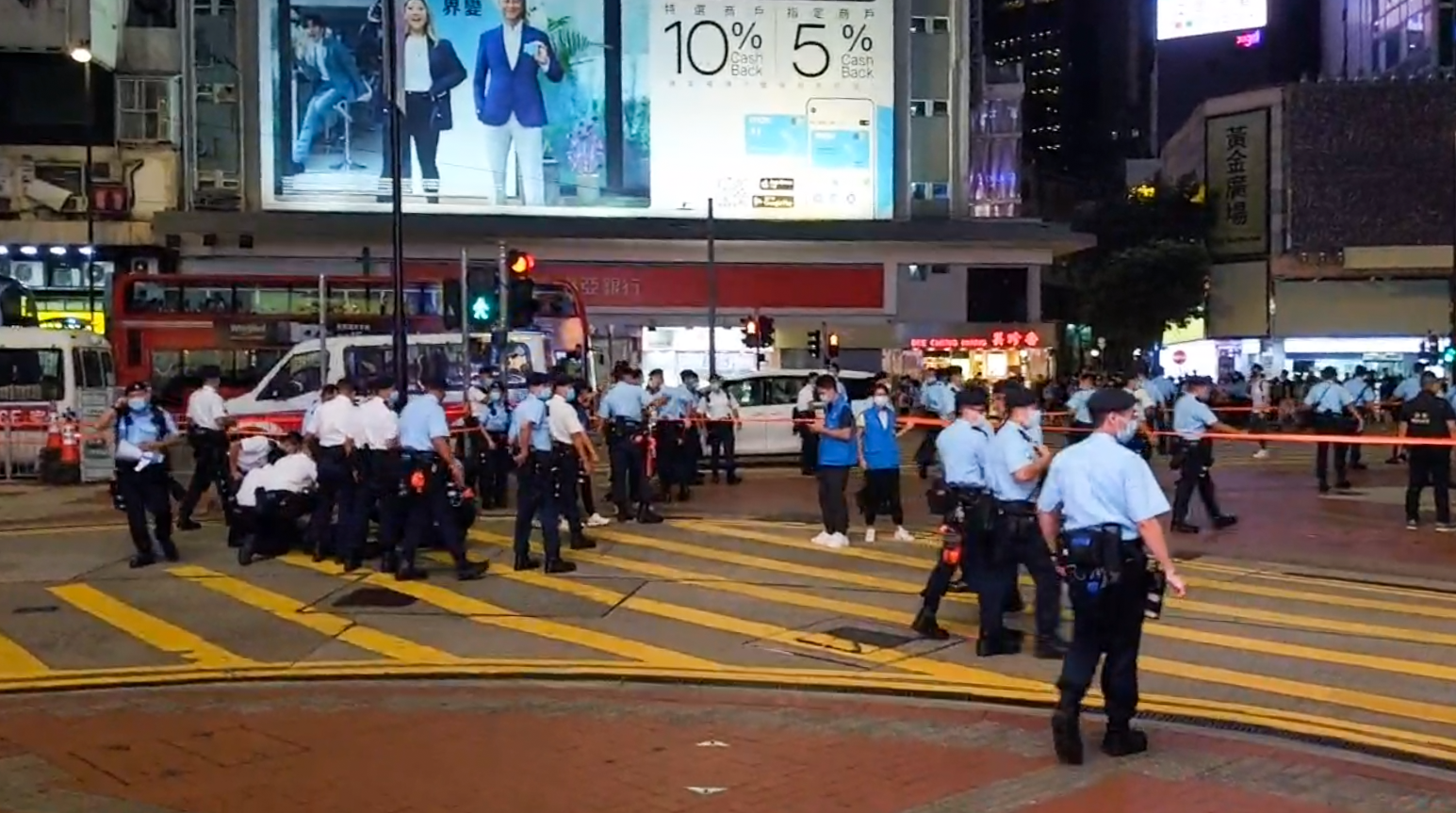
Large number of police officers sealing off East Point Road after the stabbing

The suspect Leung Kin-fai had worked as director of purchasing department for Vitasoy International since 2016, and as an information officer for Apple Daily in 2008. He was single, living with his parents in a Tenement building in San Po Kong, and without criminal record. The police found a large number of Apple Daily newspaper clippings, social movement propaganda leaflets, books, notes, and a USB memory card belonging to the deceased, which contained suicide notes declaring his hatred of police and his intention to kill an officer on July 1 which marked the 24th anniversary of Hong Kong's return to Chinese sovereignty, and explaining the settling of his financial affairs. The suicide note mentioned the police "sheltering criminals", their "atrocities", and that they could not be checked and balanced under the system. He also thought that there was no longer freedom after the implementation of the Hong Kong national security law. Security Secretary Chris Tang said on 2 July that materials found on Leung's computer had shown that he had been "radicalised", but gave no further details.

On 4 July, police announced that the attack was being investigated by its national security department. Police chief Raymond Siu said the department was investigating whether other parties were behind the attack. On 6 July, Steve Li, Senior Superintendent of the Police National Security Department, said that police had found a large amount of newspapers, which he did not name, which were "inciting hate and fake news".

== Background and media analyses ==
The attack occurred on the date of the 24th anniversary of the establishment of the Hong Kong Special Administrative Region of the People's Republic of China (HKSAR), considered a sensitive date in the city.

In their first two decades, the 1 July marches that referenced the establishment of the HKSAR were peaceful mass protests of the pro-democracy movement and civic groups. The 2019–2020 Hong Kong protests saw public mistrust in police officers strongly increasing, with many demonstrators seeing them as agents of the government. The national security law, which the central government pushed through during a lull in the protests caused by the first wave of the COVID-19 pandemic, changed the climate in the city fundamentally. At illegal protests on 1 July 2020, around 370 arrests were made, and after another illegal protest in September with around 300 arrests, no further large protests took place. Thousands left the city to take up offers of safe harbour by Western democracies.

On 1 July 2021, the day of the stabbing, protests were again banned, ostensibly due to the COVID-19 pandemic, and this time suppressed through a large citywide deployment of police, including water cannon trucks and armoured vehicles, as well as the stopping and searching of passers-by. At least 20 arrests were made. At the time of the stabbing, the police had enclosed the nearby Victoria Park, which had normally been the starting point of the marches.

The polarized climate in the city reflected itself in the scarcity of milder or more nuanced statements about the attack, according to a July 2021 New York Times article. While the government used the incident, as well as news of a bomb plot that was foiled days later, as supporting its narrative that the city was under threat of random acts of violence, some in the city were skeptical about these claims; for many, the separation of power between the government and the police had become blurred.

The New York Times noted that the event, along with the foiled bomb plot several days later, was reopening an uncomfortable debate within the pro-democracy movement about whether it condoned or even supported violence – a question that had already dogged the protests in 2019.

== Reactions ==
=== Citizens ===
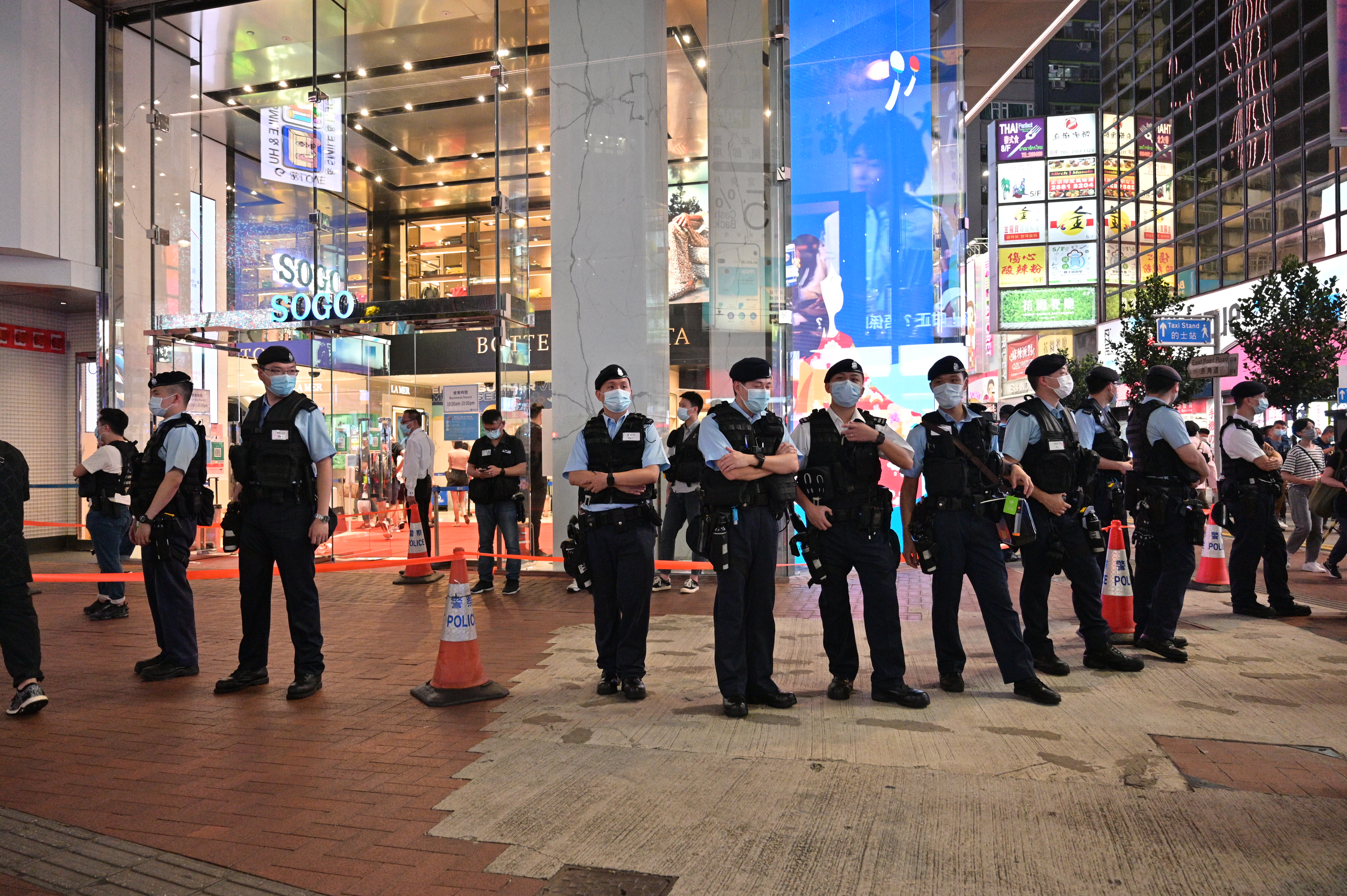
Tactical Unit police officers on guard at the entrance of Causeway Bay Sogo to prevent citizens from laying flowers to mourn Leung

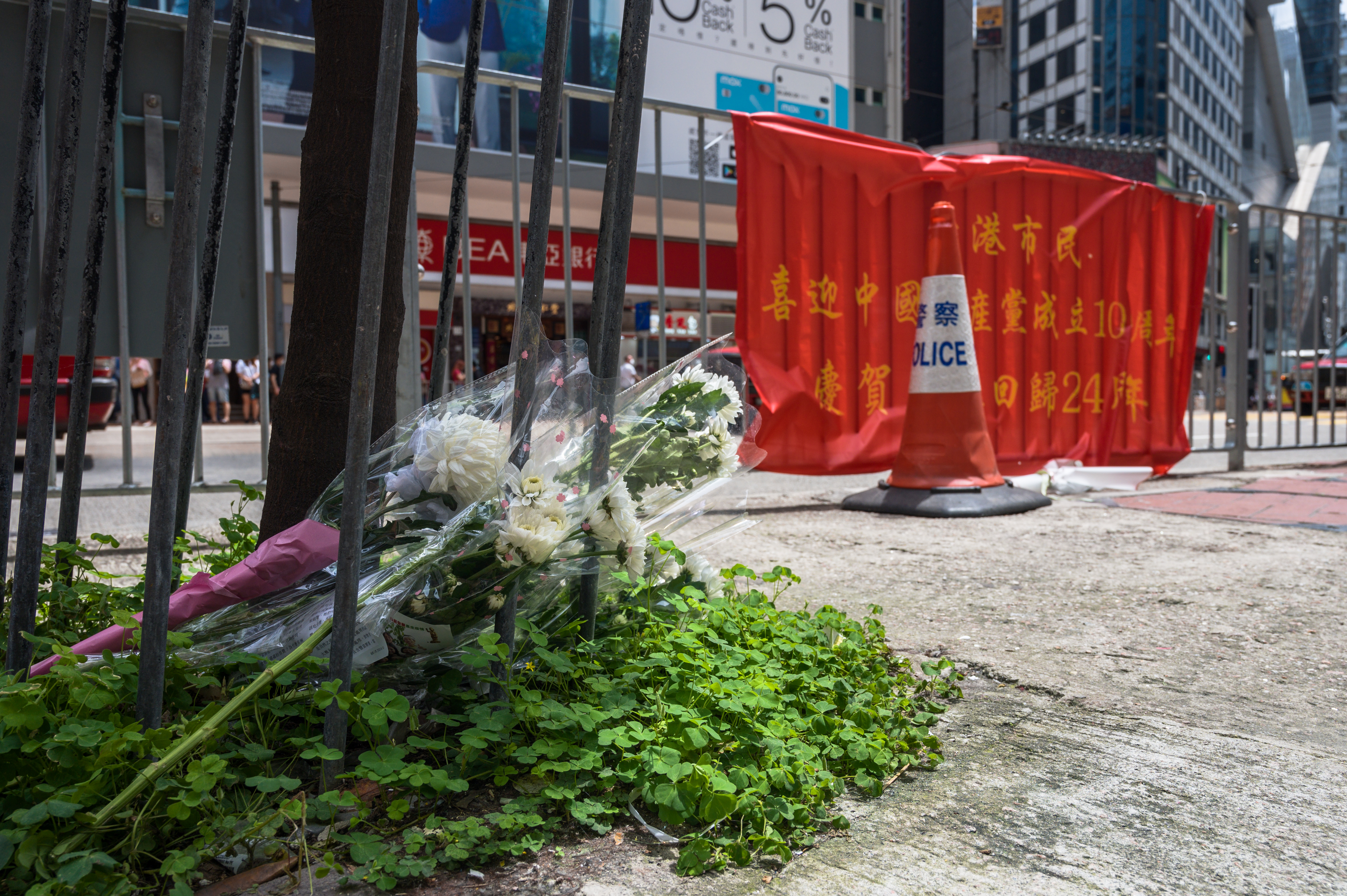
Flowers left by mourners

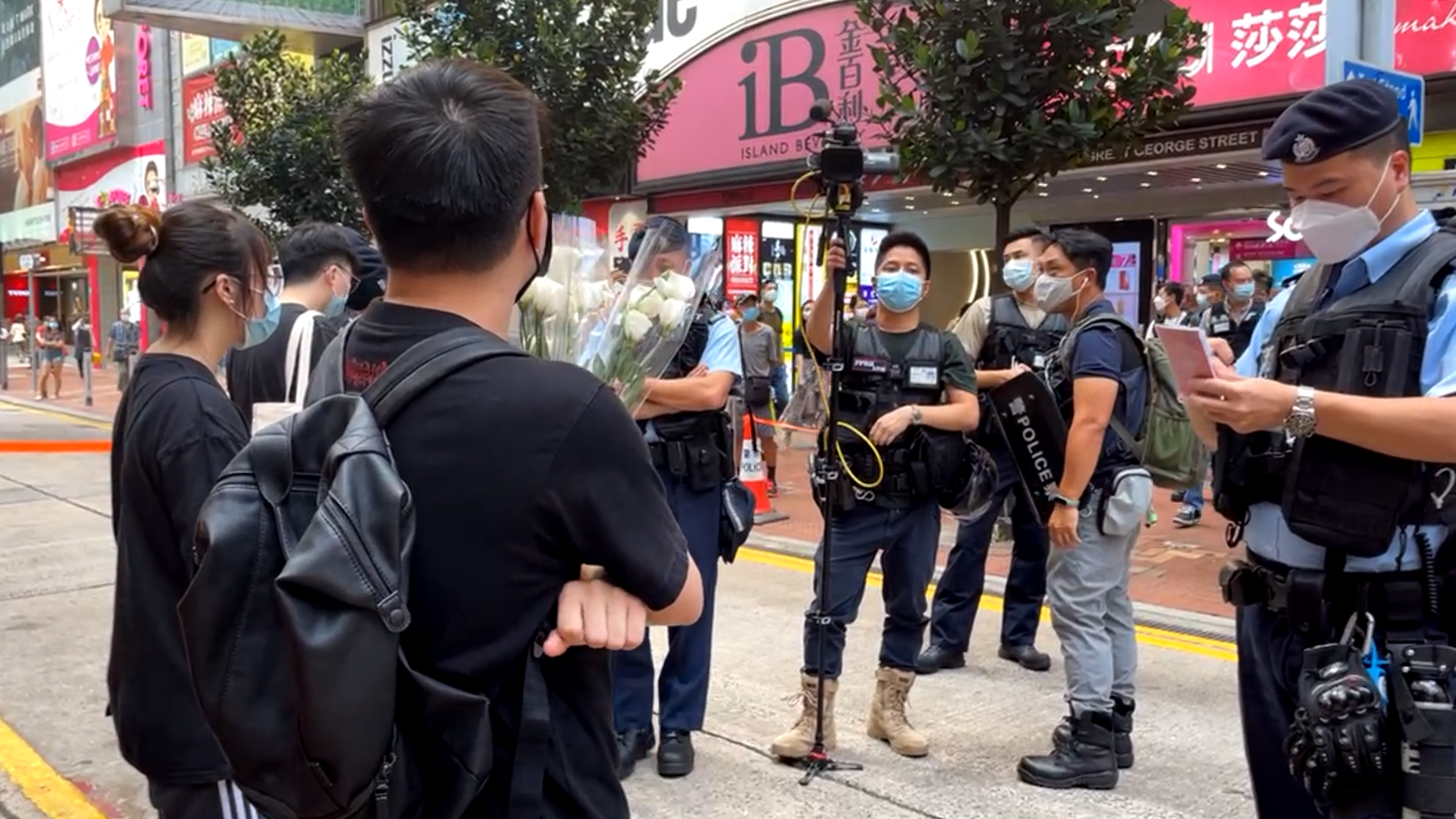
Police officers charging citizens holding flowers

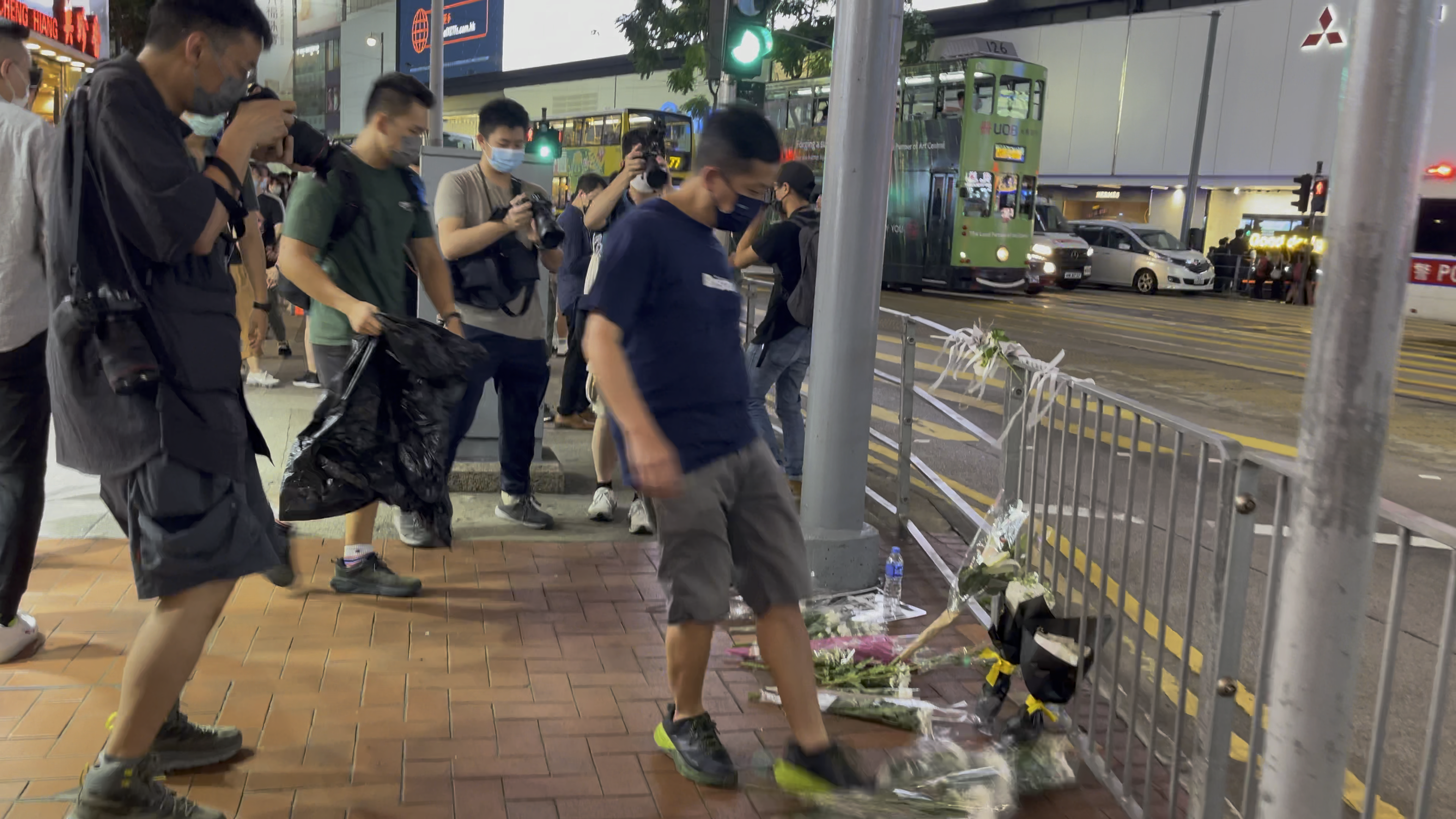
A man kicking flowers. Local media reported that flowers were also seized and placed in police vehicles on the same occasion.

After the stabbing, some netizens praised Leung, calling him a "martyr" and "the brave". In a statement on 2 July which made reference to these online comments, the Hong Kong police warned the public against any "attempt to romanticize or glorify the despicable act with seditious intent to incite hatred in society." Several arrests for online comments were made subsequently (see derived arrests).

Over the following week, and in spite of a warning by Hong Kong police that encouraging such memorials was tantamount to supporting terrorism, citizens brought flowers to the site to mourn the knifeman. Some were accompanied by young children.

==== 2 July ====
Outside Causeway Bay Sogo – the site of the attack – and at nearby doorways and the handrail of a nearby subway station's entrance, citizens laid flowers to mourn the death. There were also people who offered Free Hugs in hope to encourage one another. However, they were soon intercepted by police officers. From noon onwards, the police started to stop and search all citizens holding flowers who were close to Sogo. Police issued littering tickets to some citizens laying white flowers and said the act of laying flowers was suspected of inciting others. Images published by local media showed white flowers (chrysanthemums according to one source) that had been placed by mourners at the site being dumped into trash cans by plainclothes police officers. Police officers hindered a reporter from filming the event. The police surrounded and investigated a young woman as she was taking pictures of a girl holding flowers on East Point Road. She was charged for violating the four-person gathering restriction order. At night, after the police unblocked the cordon, a man tried to place a bouquet but was immediately pulled into the cordon and taken away.

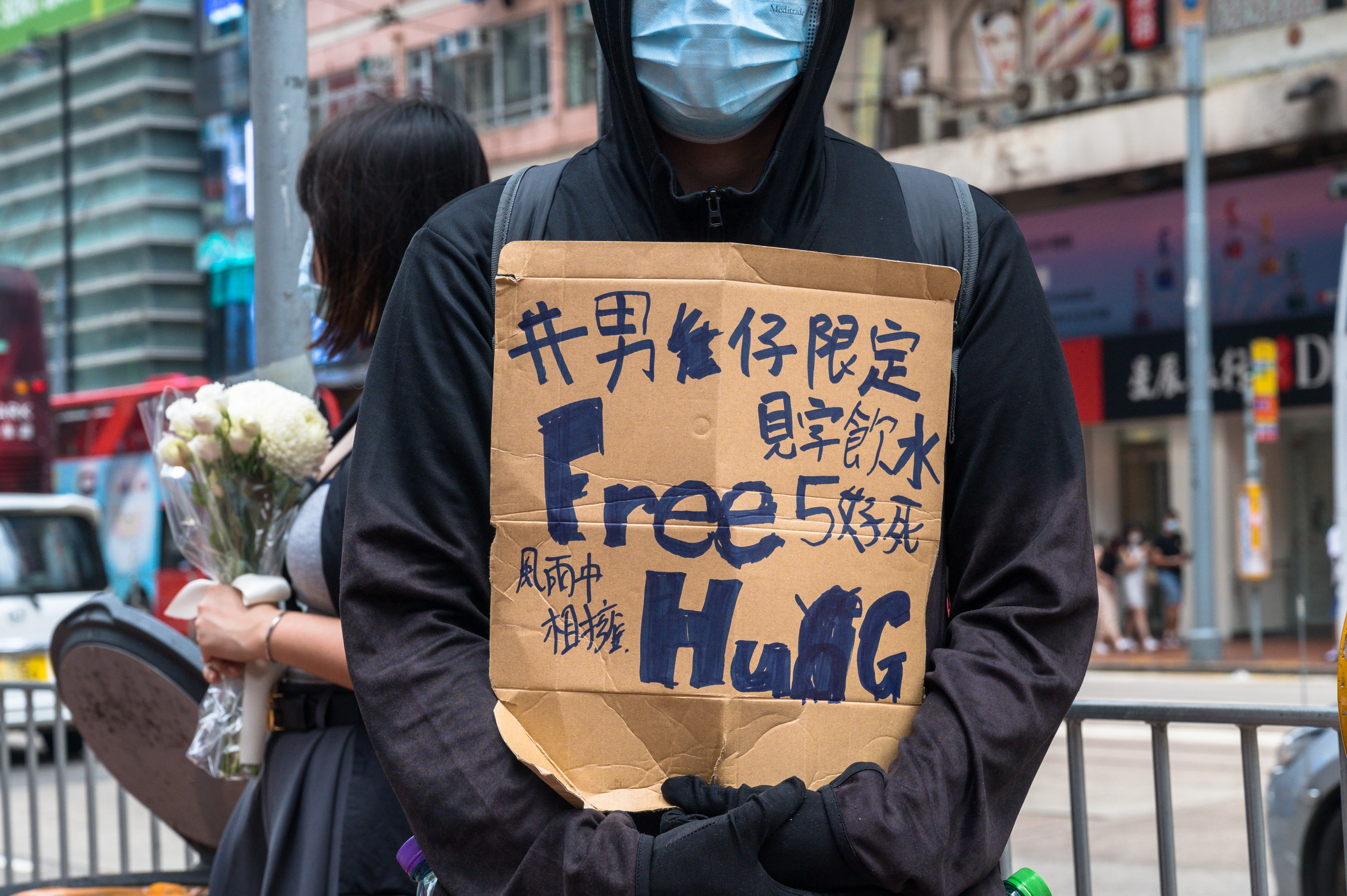
In the afternoon, a man offered free hugs at the site of the attack.

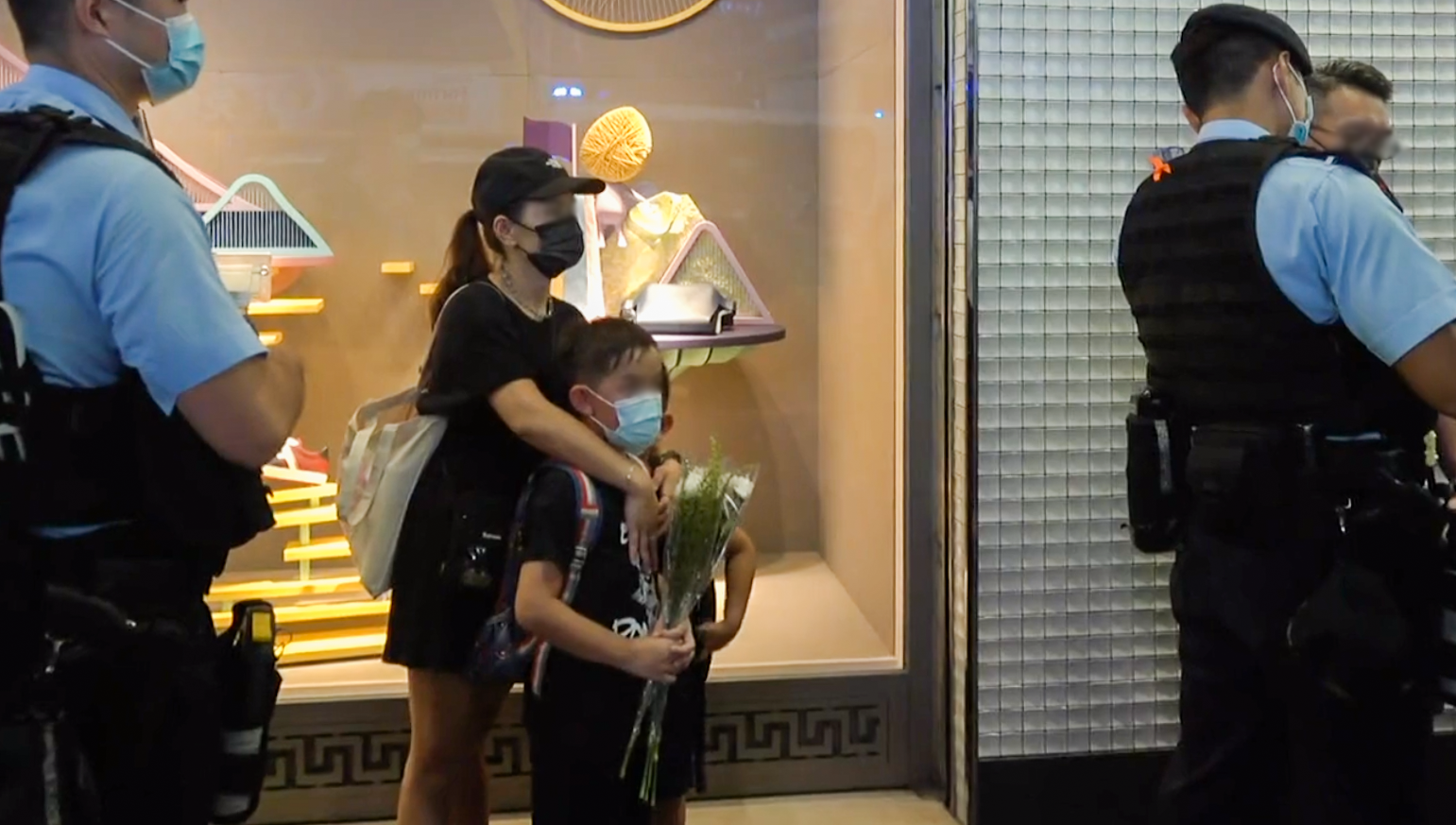
At about 8 pm, a mother and her two young children holding flowers were surrounded and searched by police officers outside Sogo.

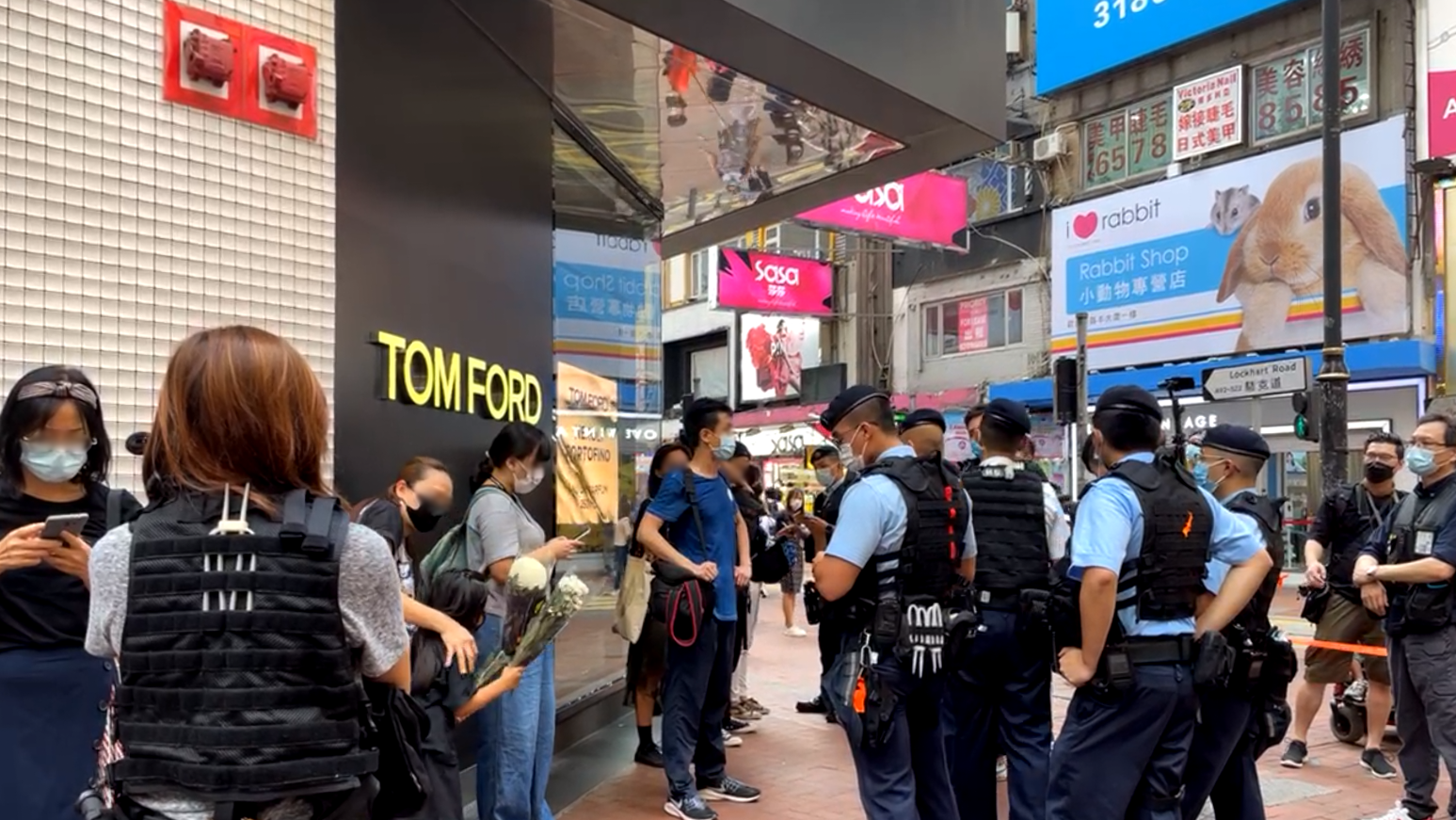
Citizens were intercepted by the police.

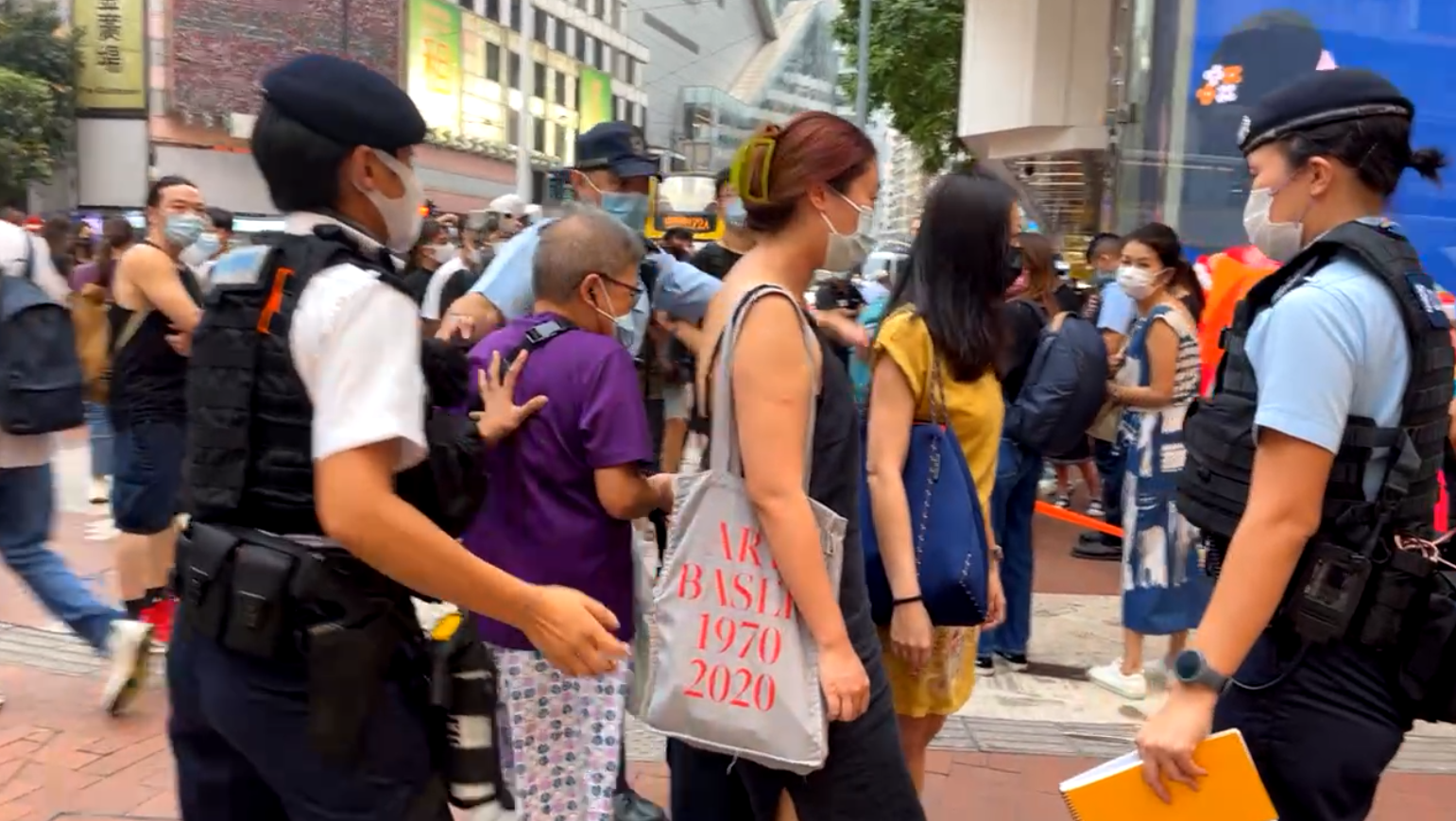
A PTU police officer pushing an elderly into defense line to stop and search

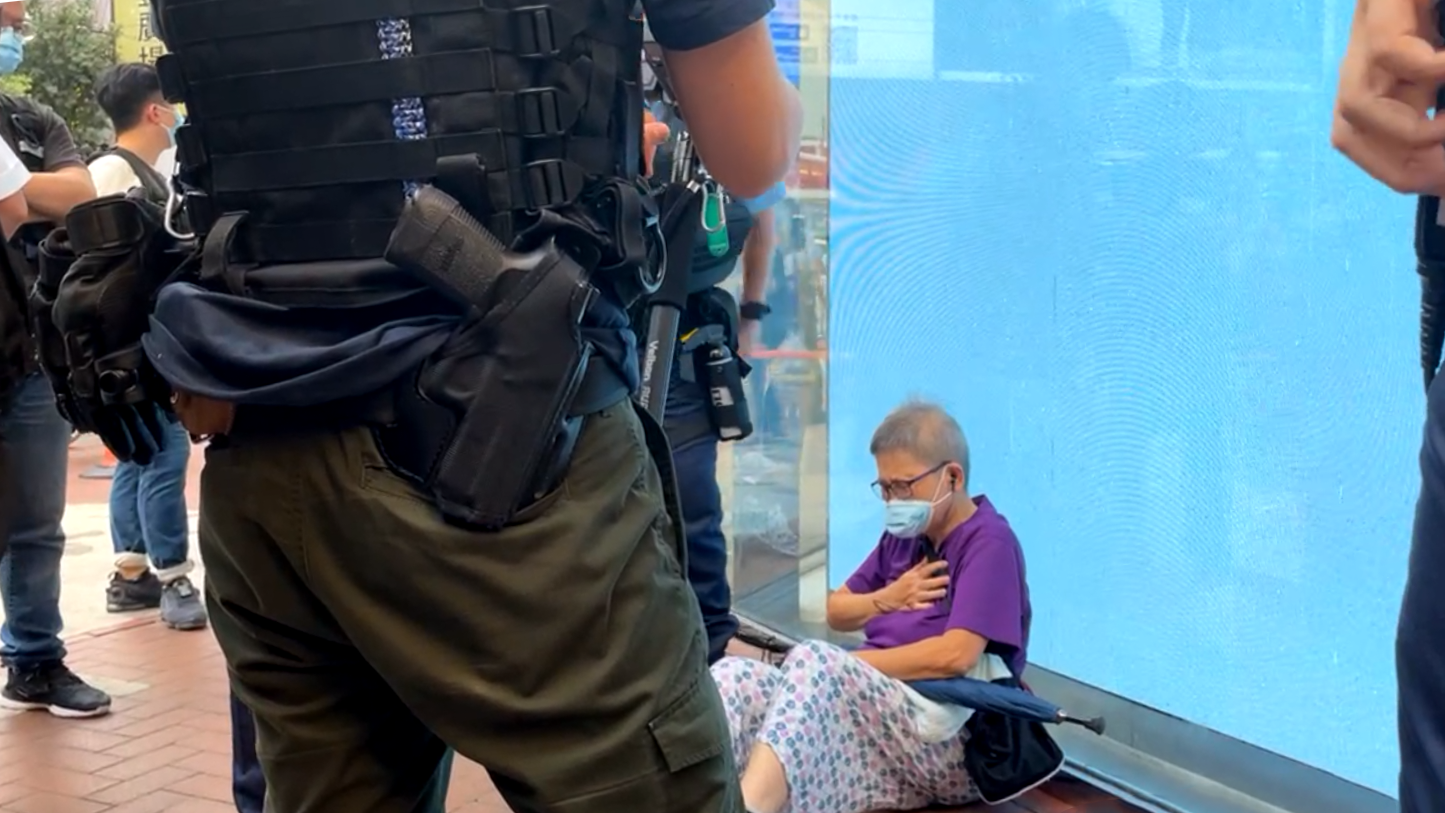
An elderly woman showing signs of discomfort after being stopped and searched by police

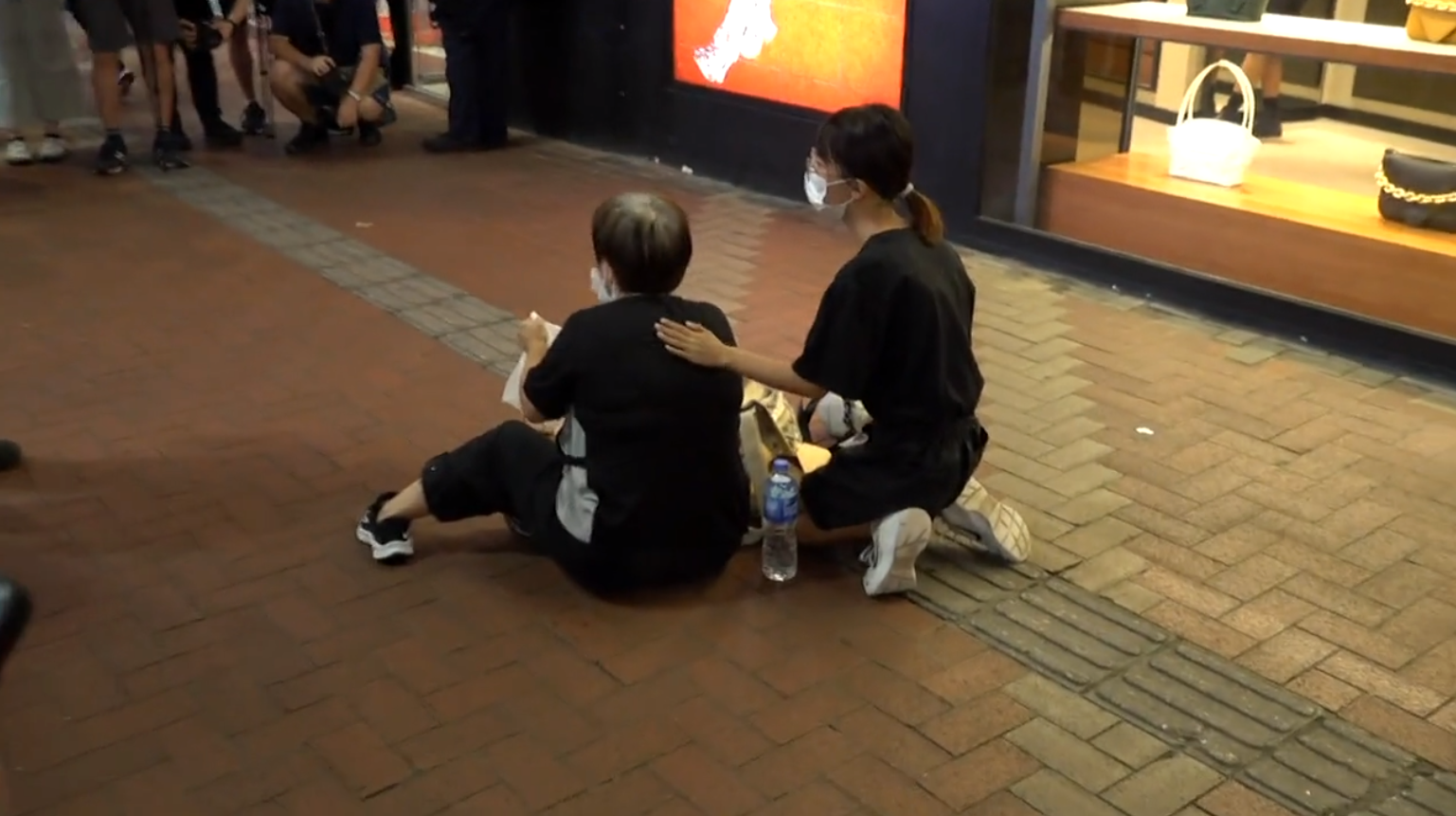
During being intercepted with her daughter, a mother was frightened.

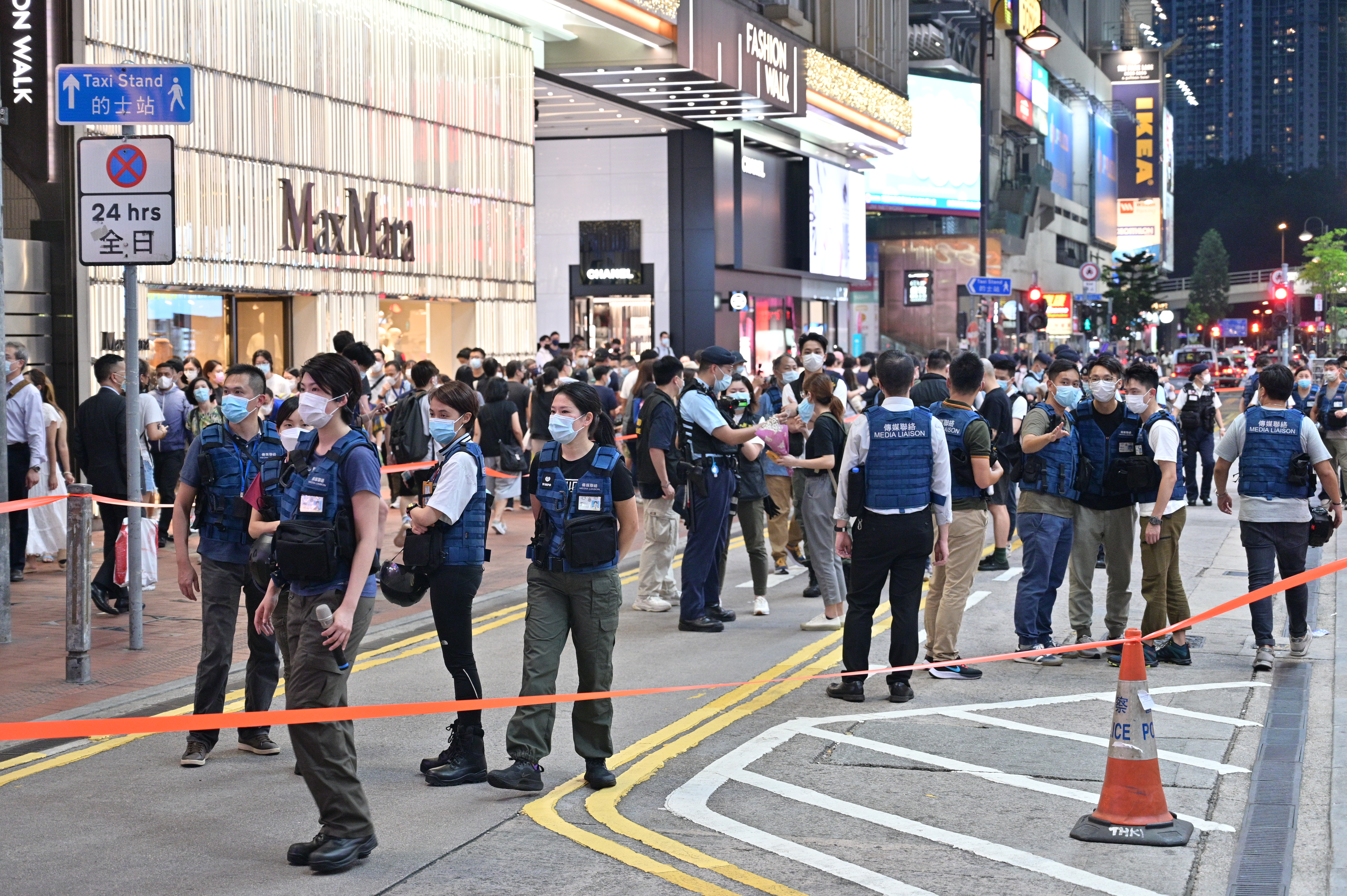
Police enclosing the pedestrian zone of Great George Street, intercepting citizens wearing black clothes and holding flowers

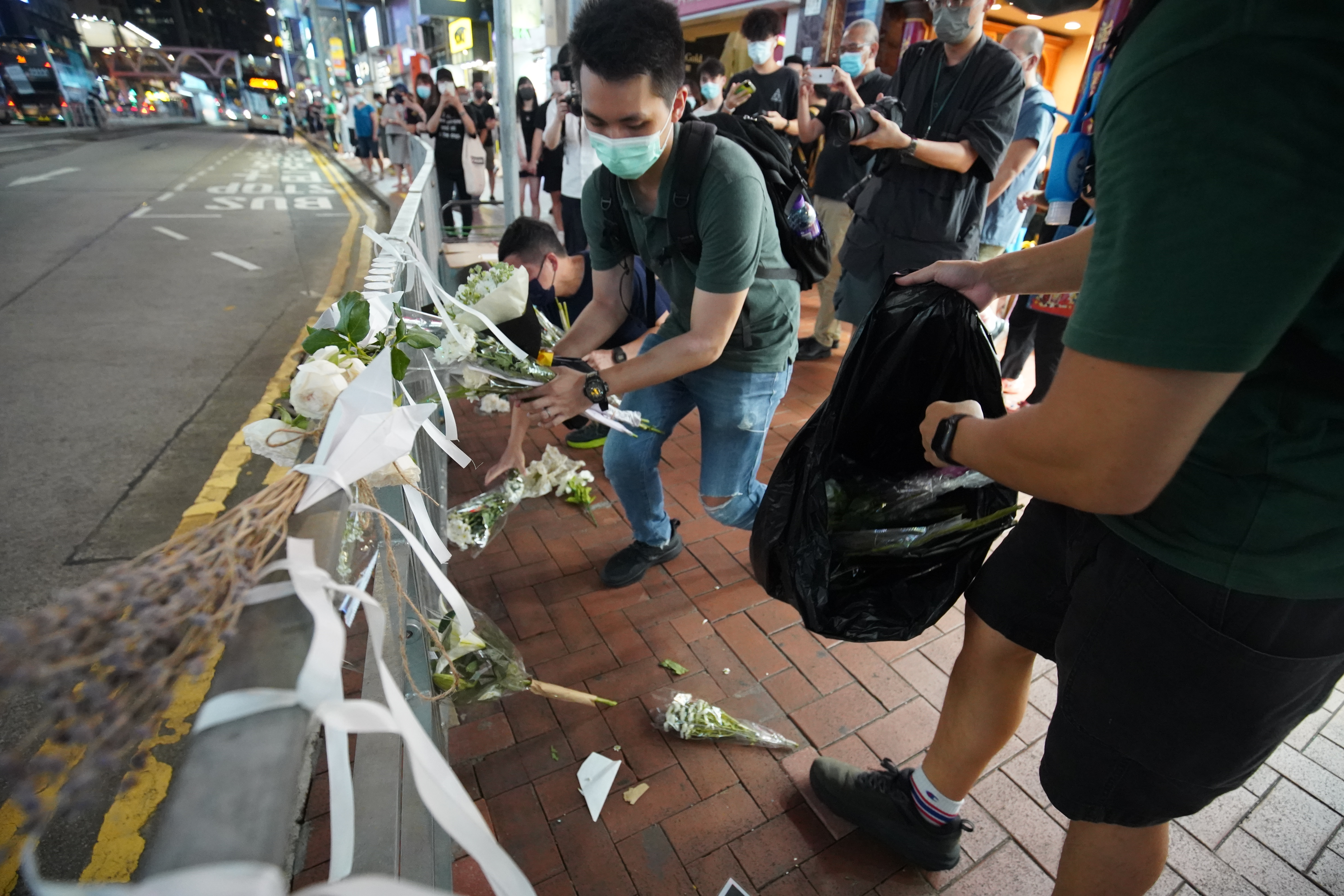
Several men clearing flowers in Hennessy Road

==== 3 July ====
Citizens continued to come to the site of the attack, holding white flowers. At least four police cars were parked outside Sogo as a number of police officers continuously stood guard. They intercepted and searched several citizens dressing in black. Police warned citizens against violating the four-person gathering restriction order and discarding objects in public places. The mourners included League of Social Democrats member Dickson Chau, who said that Hong Kong was facing unprecedented suppression, and that the strictness that police had shown the day before in preventing commemorations had even exceeded that before planned commemorations of the 12 June 2019 Hong Kong protest. A secondary school student said he had been stopped and checked four times in a day, and being interrogated by the police, "Has someone died in your family?", "Are you also going to hold a bunch of flowers when going to school?". He was let go after explaining, but was stopped and checked again at the entrance of Sogo. Police were shadowing and taking photos of citizens as they were interviewed by Stand News, saying that this was to see if there was any inflammatory speech. In the evening, there were still citizens showing up to mourn.

==== 7 July ====
Owing to the seventh day after the death of a person being particularly significant in Chinese culture, an increase in mourning activities, or attempts at this, had been anticipated for this and the following day. As a reaction to online calls to "mourn" the attacker according to this custom, police stepped up patrolling in the Causeway Bay shopping area. A woman who held white flowers near the site of the attack was stopped and searched by police. She was found to have carried a box cutter and arrested. A woman holding some chives was stopped and searched, and when she took out a flower and bowed during the search, she was told to stop. She was let go after a warning. At night, a man wearing water boots was found to have gas masks, knives, pliers and other items in his backpack. He was taken on a police car. One source reported that Alexandra Wong, who had come to be known as "Grandma Wong" during the protests in 2019, went to the site with white flowers, but was immediately surrounded by officers who told her to refrain from mourning. At around 10:00 pm, a large number of police entered nearby Fashion Walk, reportedly as two men were suspected of having attacked a woman who had repeatedly visited the mourning site. One of the men was arrested and the woman sent to hospital for feeling unwell.

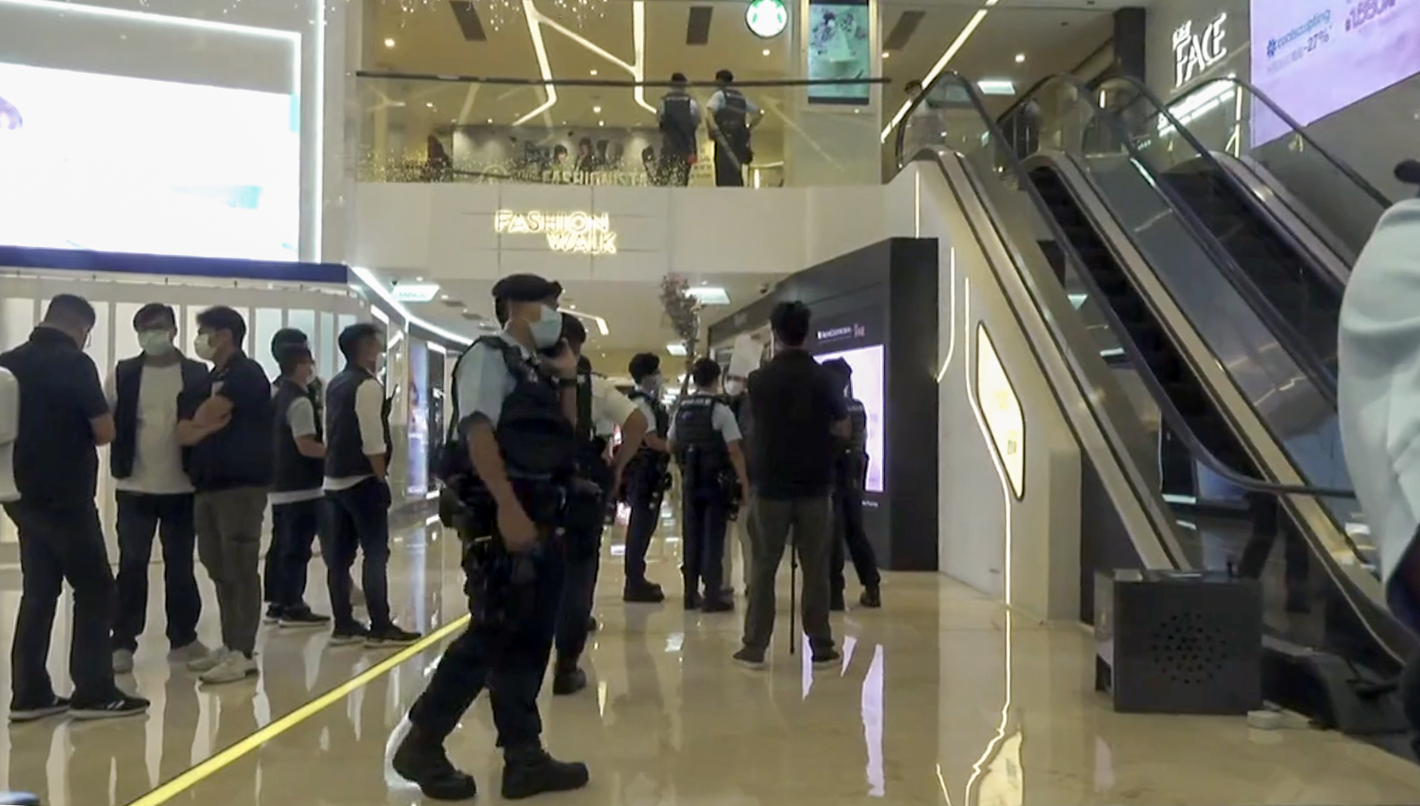
At 10:00 pm, a large number of police officers walked into Fashion Walk.

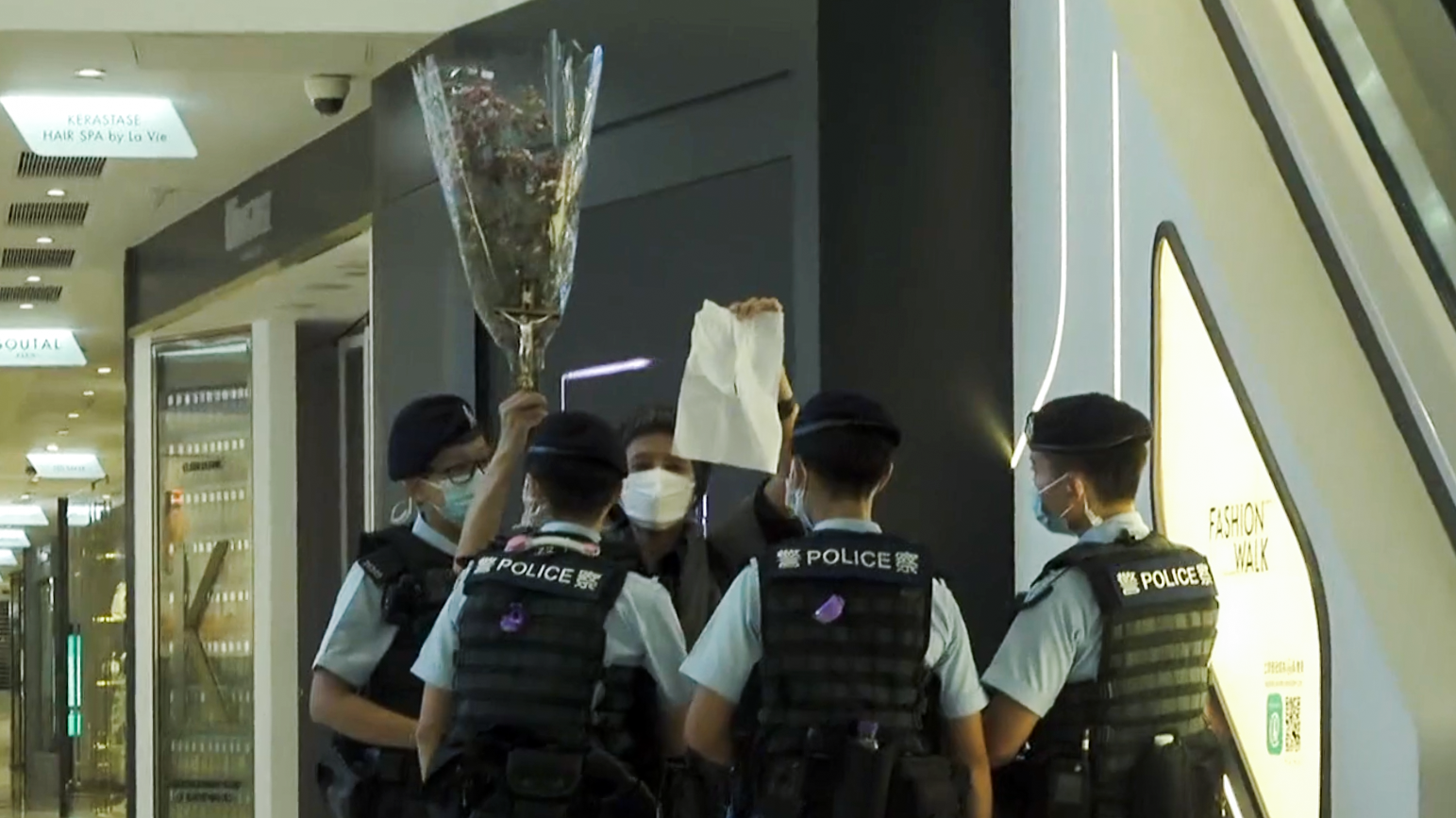
A woman holding a white paper and a cross was surrounded by police officers in Fashion Walk.

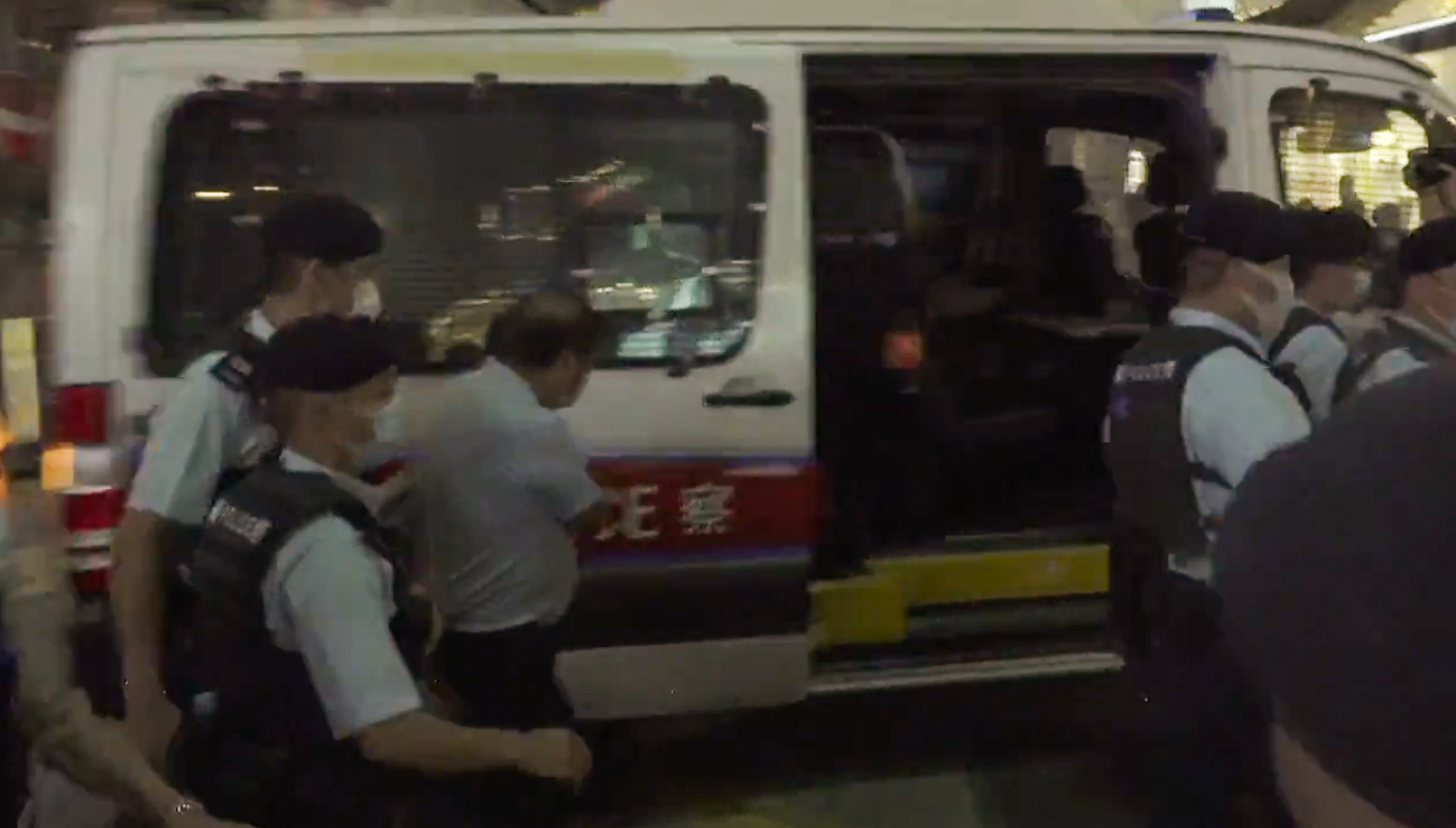
A man who was suspected of attacking a woman was taken on a police car without handcuffs.

==== 8 July ====
Police deployed at least a dozen of officers to the site. A woman was warned that any effort to pay tribute to the knifeman could potentially be charged as inciting behavior, and that she would be handed a ticket for littering if she put down the flowers she had brought.

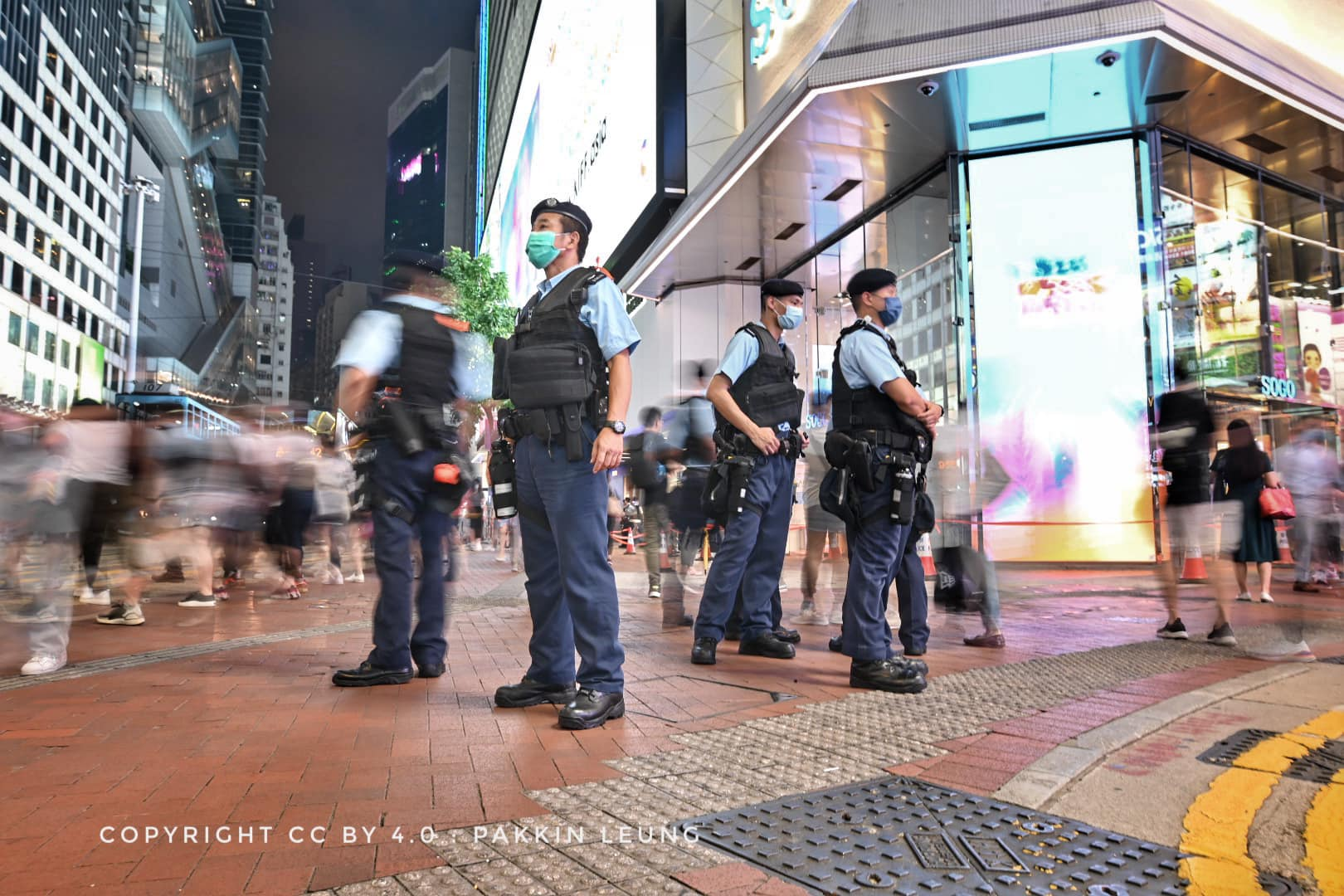
The police strengthened their anti-attack measures after the incident. Front-line police officers wore anti-stab tactical vests on duty and patrolled in groups of four.

=== Hong Kong government ===
Hong Kong Chief Executive Carrie Lam condemned the stabbing, saying that it was "very regrettable that this has come at a time when everyone in Hong Kong sets great store by the peaceful situation we have achieved."

Secretary for Security and former Commissioner of Police Chris Tang declared it a "lone-wolf-style terrorist attack". On 2 July he said, "It's not just the assailant who has to be held responsible for this incident, but also the many people who customarily advocate violence, incite hatred against the country, and beautify these attacks – these acts of violence".

On 4 July, in response to some residents having laid flowers and observing a moment of silence at the site of the attack on 2 July Hong Kong police warned in a statement that advocating to mourn for the attacker was "no different from supporting terrorism". Under the Hong Kong national security law, promoting, inciting and supporting terrorism is punishable by up to ten years in prison. It also warned that "any act with a seditious intention" could be prosecuted, punishable under Hong Kong law by up to two years in prison.

=== Political parties ===
==== Pro-Beijing camp ====
The New People's Party said the incident was planned and premeditated, and that Hong Kong had been full of hatred towards the police and China in recent years. It described the incident as a "lone-wolf attack" and praised police officers on spot for their quick responses. Hong Kong Federation of Trade Unions said the behavior of the attacker was brutal and severely challenged the rule of law in Hong Kong.

==== Pro-democracy camp ====
Kelvin Sin, Information Technology and Broadcasting Policy spokesperson of the Democratic Party criticised the police for determining the perpetrator had been affected by false information or reports within a short period of time and the government for not facing public grievances, worrying that legislation governing fake news would lead to self-censorship of the media, damaging the public's right to know.

=== Scholars ===
Paul Yip Siu-fai, director of the Centre for Suicide Research and Prevention at the University of Hong Kong, said that violence should never be condoned, and that someone resorting to "such an extreme and cruel way to hurt others and himself" had "rung a warning bell to society". He questioned the effectiveness of strengthening security measures or increasing the national security budget in countering these problems, as "some extremists or fragile people may opt for drastic ways to express their discontent".

An unnamed psychology professor at a university in Hong Kong warned against blaming the attack on mental health issues alone, rejecting this as a "simplistic explanation", as published by CNN News. He said that the authorities in Hong Kong had become an "easy target on which people can project all their frustration and disappointment, political or otherwise", and that Hong Kong people still had not "had the chance to collectively process or resolve" their experiences of the protests in 2019.

=== Legal profession ===
As reported by RTHK on 4 July, Johannes Chan expressed his belief that it was not possible at that time to determine whether the incident was a terrorist activity. He also stated that Commissioner of Police Raymond Siu's statement that mourning the attacker may violate the law was far-fetched. He said that mourning could be motivated by sympathy and dissatisfaction with the government and warned that conflict between the government and the public would become even more serious if relevant actions were considered illegal. Security Secretary Chris Tang condemned Chan sharply, saying: "I hope that this law professor can sleep at night", and warned of possible "bloodshed" in the city as a result of Chan's comments. In what appeared to be an oblique reference to Chan, Chief Secretary John Lee said that "People, especially those with a legal background, must understand that what they say has an influence on society", adding that "Those who try to play down terrorism will be 'sinners for 1,000 years'."

=== Internal statement by Vitasoy ===
Vitasoy International, where Leung worked before his death, said in an internal notice published online that he "unfortunately passed away", and "we extend our deepest condolences to Leung's family". Vitasoy's message of condolences to a man who had stabbed a police officer, had triggered angry responses from mainland Chinese netizens, who threatened a boycott, while several mainland celebrities had terminated collaborations with the company, including actors Gong Jun and Ren Jialun. Shares of Vitasoy tumbled in the morning of 5 July, a Monday. In response, on 3 July Vitasoy issued a public apology which called the previous notice "highly inappropriate", and said that the responsible staff had been fired. The statement expressed support for the police investigation, and for stability in Hong Kong and China. However the firing of the staff did not stop the boycott in the mainland but instead received strong criticism from Hong Kong netizens.

=== Motion by Hong Kong University Student Union ===
On 7 July, the student union of the University of Hong Kong passed a motion to mourn the death of the attacker, and to praise his "sacrifice". The motion had been voted for by 30 of the 32 attending undergraduate students, with two abstentions and no objections, and was announced on the union's social media immediately after having been passed. On 8 July the Security Bureau condemned the motion as "no different from supporting and encouraging terrorism", and that the description as "sacrifice" was "confusing right and wrong". A statement by the university the same day said that the portrayal of the incident in the motion had sent a "totally wrong message to society". Arthur Li, chairman of the governing council of the university, said that the motion was "something indecent and not acceptable", and that he would welcome a national security investigation into the responsible student union leaders. On 18 August, police superintendent Steve Li called the motion "very shocking", said that it "encouraged people to attempt suicide" and that it did not align with "our moral standards".

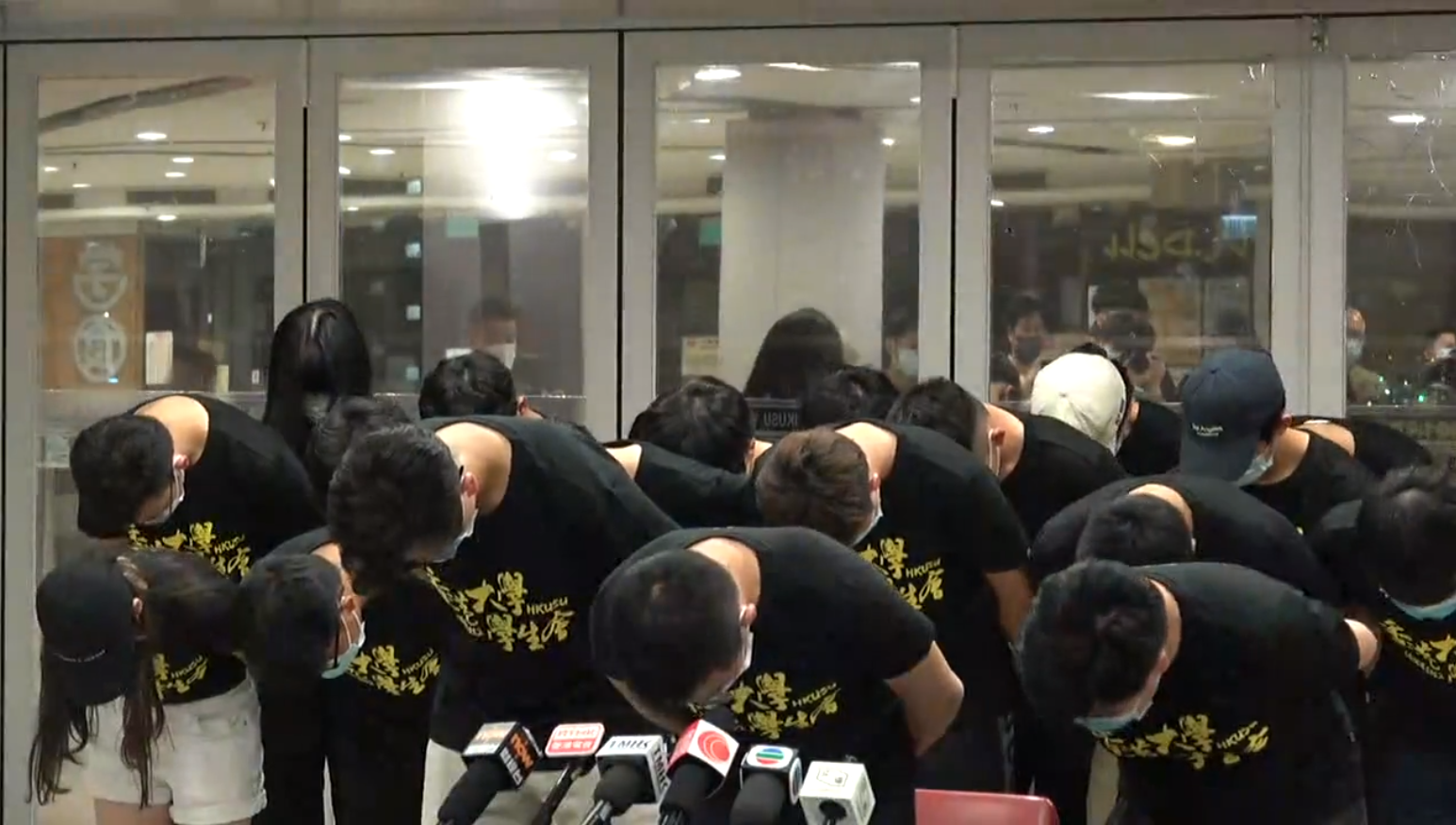
Student union members in a press conference, announcing their resignation

At a press conference in the early hours of 9 July the executive committee of the student union apologized for the motion, with the union president saying that its content was "seriously inappropriate", and stepped down from their posts, as did some student union council members. The same day, the university club associations distanced themselves from the original motion, saying that some representatives had been absent at the voting, while others had failed to be "politically neutral" due to "misunderstanding", for which they apologized. On 13 July the university issued a statement saying that it no longer recognized the student union and would investigate and "take further action" against students involved in the matter. Hours earlier, Chief Executive Carrie Lam had urged for action by police or the university, describing the motion as "shameful for the university".

On 16 July, the police national security unit raided an office of the student union, as well as the headquarters of the university student media outlet CampusTV, under a search warrant. They confirmed that the investigation was with co-operation from the university, but refused to provide further details. The university said that it was "obliged to act in compliance" with the probe. Offices of the student magazine Undergrad were also searched.

On 4 August, the council of the university announced that it had ordered all students who had attended the 7 July meeting to be denied access to its Pok Fu Lam campus, and prohibited them from using any of its facilities and services until further notice, citing "serious legal and reputational risks" for the university. The following day, Eric Cheung Tat-ming, principal lecturer at the law faculty of the university, expressed disagreement with the justification of the ban, pointing to the university already having cut ties with the student union. Cheung said he had filed an immediate letter of resignation from the governing council of the university the night before. He left open the question of whether his resignation was related to the campus ban for the students, saying only that there had been "many considerations" involved. On 5 August seven members of the governing council of the university signed an open letter in which they denounced the council's decision as "improper according to legal principles", admonishing that "principles of due process and natural justice" had not been followed by denying the students a hearing, and that the "excuse" of risk containment to justify the campus ban was "arbitrarily depriving students of their opportunity to learn" and did not "fit the public expectations of a university to teach by giving guidance". Hundreds of alumni also criticized the sanctioning of the students by the university.

On 18 August, four student leaders were arrested by national security police over allegedly "advocating terrorism", a crime punishable by a mandatory sentence of five to 10 years under Article 27 of the national security law. Senior Superintendent Steve Li said that CCTV footage found during the 16 July raid provided evidence that the four had spoken during the 7 July meeting. The heads of magazine Undergrad and CampusTV and a third student were taken by police to assist with investigations. Li said that police would also meet other attendees "to understand their roles in the meeting". The four arrestees were to appear in court on 19 August. In an email from 24 August, Registrar Jeannie Tsang asked the students about their "role[s] and manner of participation" in the meeting, while saying that the information would not be used in disciplinary proceedings, if these were started. A group of university former council members reacted by saying that this was further proof that the 4 August council statement had been "unfounded", and that the university had not "even know[n] who they are punishing". All four defendants were granted bail; one on 27 August after the High Court rejected a prosecution challenge against a decision by a lower court, and the remaining three on 24 September by the High Court, overturning a decision by a lower court. Details of the High Court ruling were released in December.

On 2 September, the university announced that it would lift the ban on 18 of the 44 student union council members. Several of the banned students received emails from the university that their ban would continue into the new semester starting on 6 September.

On 11 September 2023, as part of a plea deal with the prosecution, the four student leaders each entered guilty pleas for the charge of incitement to wound with intent. The deal allowed them to avoid the charge of advocating terrorism, which carries a maximum sentence of ten years as opposed to seven under the wounding with intent charge. On 30 October, Judge Adriana Noelle Tse Ching, stated the four student leaders had "glorified violence and abused their powers as student leaders" and sentenced them to two years of jail each. On 13 September 2024, the Court of Appeal reduced the sentences to 15 months each after it found them "excessive", local media reported. On 24 September, the application of one of the student leaders for early release was turned down by the High Court after a ruling by the National Security Committee on the matter, and his detention was ruled to be "fully lawful".

== Derived arrests ==
In the days after the stabbing, several citizens were arrested for opinions and comments on the internet which advocated for violence against police or police premises, or lauded the knifeman. In at least one of these cases, its occurrence soon after the stabbing was cited by the police force as reason for their belief that it was related to the stabbing.

On 4 July, a 20-year-old woman and a 26-year-old man were arrested (in Sha Tin and Tin Shui Wai respectively, according to one source), for social media messages allegedly inciting others to murder police officers and commit arson on police premises. Local media reported police as saying that the arrests had been the result of investigations carried out after an increase of online messages advocating for violence, including killing police officers, in the wake of the 1 July stabbing. Superintendent Wilson Tam of the Technology Crime Division of the police force did not rule out future arrests in relation to the investigation. He said that the two arrestees may also have been in violation of an October 2019 temporary High Court injunction, still in force, against inciting violence on social media platforms.

On 5 July, a 34-year-old man was arrested in Yau Ma Tei for allegedly inciting others to commit the crime of having intent to injure others, with statements including "cutting police officers" on an online forum on 2 July cited as evidence. The police did not rule out that more people would be arrested. They said they believed that the case did indeed relate to the 1 July police stabbing, due to it having happened after that date.

On 9 July, the police arrested a 36-year-old man in Tsz Wan Shan on suspicion of "inciting others to commit the crime of having intent to injure others" and "inciting violence" through a post that was published on an online forum on 2 July. The post included instructions on how to use a knife against officers, with details including which body parts to aim for, and the right time to attack. This brought the total number of arrests in relation to social media posts advocating violence in the wake of the 1 July attack to four. Superintendent Tam said that since the police stabbing on 1 July, "criminals" had continued to "preach attacks" on the Internet. Police were still investigating whether the arrestee had been the originator of the online post, or had copied it from elsewhere. In addition, two men were arrested for alleged criminal damage through drawing graffiti in a pedestrian tunnel in Tuen Mun which referenced the 1 July stabbing.

On 21 February 2022, a magistrate allowed the woman arrested on 4 July and the two arrested later to continue their bail while adding new terms in view of, in her words, the "seriousness of the offence" and "the background of the case". The new terms included a requirement to surrender travel documents.

In March 2022, a Hong Kong man named Yung Cheong-ming was arrested over charges of intending to incite people to wound officers. The basis of the arrest had been screenshots, made in February and March 2022 by a detective of the police's cybercrime unit, of Yung's anonymous comments on the forum LIHKG which had related to the 1 July stabbing. Yung was found guilty of the charge on 4 October 2024.

== Impact ==
In a radio interview with RTHK on 24 July, Chief Executive Carrie Lam cited the attack as a reason why she would not hold town hall meetings before her policy address scheduled for October. Since 2019, when she introduced the town halls as a means to quell public dissatisfaction about her administration before the background of the 2019–2020 Hong Kong protests, no further editions had taken place.

The reporter who filmed the incident live for a US-based online media outlet was visited at her residence by police, and was taken to Wan Chai Police Station to make a statement, supposedly as a witness. She attended accompanied by a friend after calling to dismiss her lawyer. Police subsequently searched her residence for evidence without a lawyer present. Returning to the police station, she made a statement in the presence of a lawyer instructed by the Hong Kong Journalists Association, who had been promised to be alerted in the event of a further query (but was not). According to the HKJA, police insisted the reporter was there to "assist an investigation". She was however made to give a statement under caution and had her travel documents confiscated and barred her from leaving the territory.

On 28 August, Stand News reported that employees of Vitasoy were asked to sign a form agreeing to share information on themselves and their family members. While Vitasoy said that this was due to "migrating general personal information" to a new system and checked by an external legal counsel for compliance, Hong Kong Confederation of Trade Unions Chief Executive Mung Siu-tat said in a 30 August interview with RTHK that the request may have violated legal provisions regarding personal data, and that he suspected that the new policy was linked to the stabbing.

== See also ==
- 2019–2020 Hong Kong protests
