= Poy =

Poy is a surname of Chinese or Spanish origin. Notable people with the name include:

- Adrienne Clarkson née Poy (born 1939), former Governor General of Canada
- Aldo Poy (born 1945), Argentine professional football player
- José Poy (1926–1996), Argentine professional football player
- Mauro Poy (born 1981), Argentine professional football player
- Neville Poy (born 1935), Canadian plastic surgeon; husband of Vivienne Poy
- Ronald Lou-Poy (contemporary), Canadian university chancellor
- Vivienne Poy (born 1941), Chinese-Canadian fashion designer and politician from Ontario; Canadian senator since 1998
- William Poy (1907–2002), Australian-Canadian businessman of Chinese descent
- Percy Hutton Fearon (1874–1948), British cartoonist who drew under the pseudonym Poy
