= Leslie Illingworth =

Welsh political cartoonist and illustrator

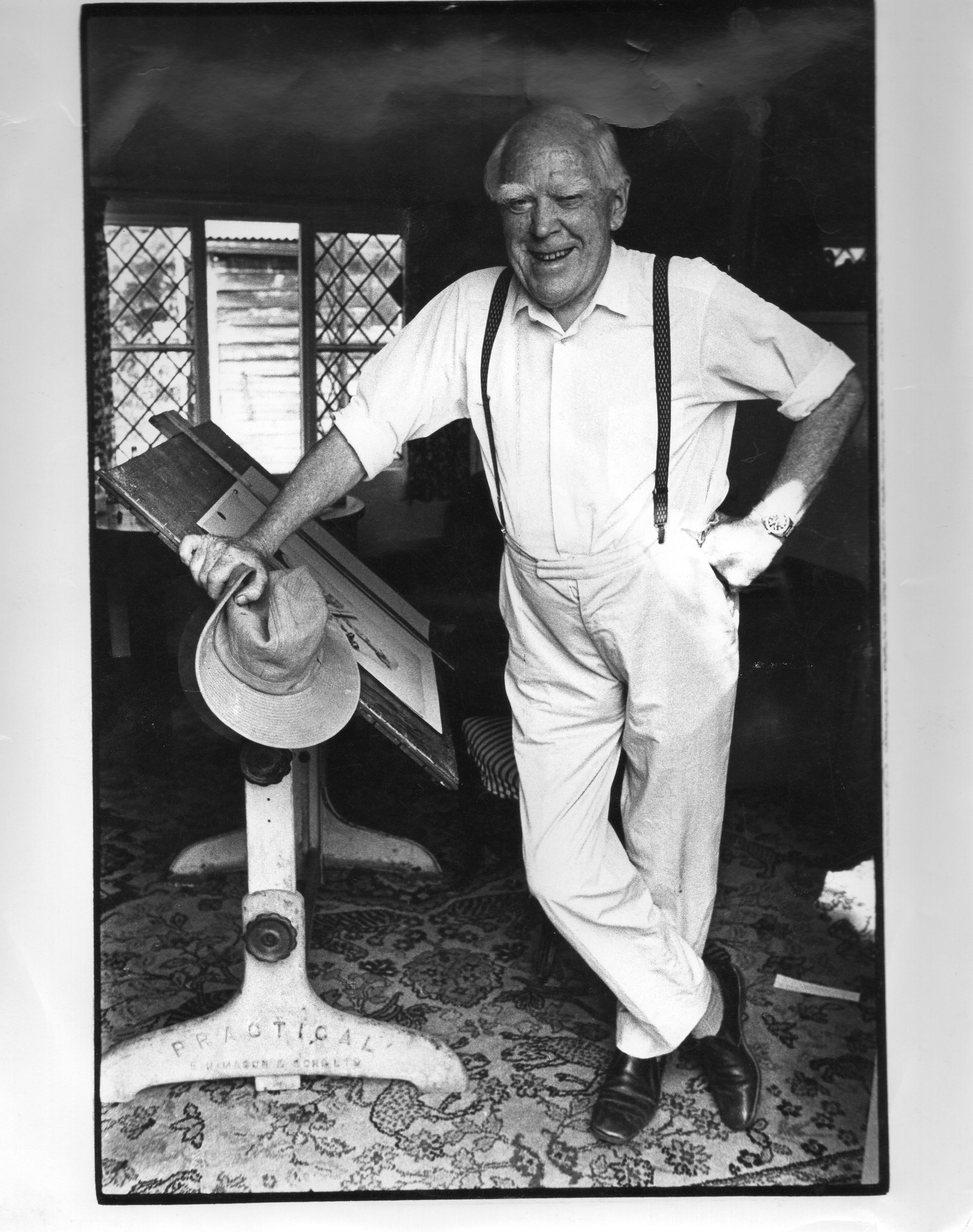
- Illingworth in retirement
- Born: Leslie Gilbert Illingworth; 2 September 1902; Barry, Wales
- Died: 20 December 1979 (aged 77); Hastings, England
- Known for: Editorial cartoon; Drawing

Leslie Gilbert Illingworth (2 September 1902 – 20 December 1979) was a Welsh political cartoonist best known for his work for the Daily Mail and for becoming the chief cartoonist at the British satirical periodical Punch.

== Early history ==
Illingworth was born on 2 September 1902 in Barry, Vale of Glamorgan in Wales in 1902 to Frederick and Helen MacGregor Illingworth. His father, who was originally from Yorkshire, was a clerk at the engineers' department for Barry Railway & Docks Company while his mother was a teacher. As a child Illingworth attended the Church School of St Athan, before winning a scholarship to the local grammar school in Barry. From Barry County School he found work at the lithographic department at the Western Mail, mainly due to the fact that his father played golf with the chief executive of the paper, Sir Robert J. Webber.

== As a cartoonist ==
Whilst working at the Western Mail, Illingworth also attended the Cardiff School of Arts, to which he had won a scholarship. Having already seen some of his artwork published in the Football Express before attending College, he now found himself drawing cartoons for the Western Mail and took on the role of deputising for the paper's celebrated political cartoonist J. M. Staniforth. In 1920 Illingworth won a further scholarship, this time to the Royal College of Art in London. He moved to the capital, but after just a few months he received news that Staniforth had died and he was offered the post of political cartoonist on the Western Mail, and he returned to Wales as Staniforth's replacement. After just three weeks in Cardiff he returned to London to study at the Slade School of Art, but he continued to be employed by the Western Mail.

Illingworth took commissioned work from Owen Aves, an editor, and when Avers became an agent he found enough work for Illingworth for him to go freelance. In 1927 Illingworth saw his first work published in the satirical magazine Punch. Illingworth then travelled to the United States and also undertook further art training in both Berlin and Paris, living in the latter for a while where he studied at the Academie Julian. On returning to Britain Illingworth was in demand as a freelance artist seeing his work appear in not only many magazines, but also in advertising for firms such as Winsor & Newton and Grey's Cigarettes.

In 1938 Percy Fearon retired as cartoonist of the Daily Mail, and Illingworth applied for the vacancy, though under a pseudonym as he correctly believed that members of the Mail staff were prejudiced against his work. Despite this his work was accepted and he joined the paper in November 1939. He was chief political cartoonist for the Mail throughout the Second World War, and although the War brought plenty of material to draw from, Illingworth's detailed style made producing daily work for the Mail and Punch a chore. In 1945, following the death of John Bernard Partridge, Illingworth was offered the position of Second Cartoonist at Punch working alongside E. H. Shepard. In 1948 he became a member of the 'Punch Table', being invited into creative meetings where the senior staff would discuss the content of forthcoming issues. Despite becoming Cartoonist of Punch a year later, a title that alternated between himself and Norman Mansbridge, he was never very creative in coming forth with satirical ideas, and would build his work on the ideas of others. Illingworth continued to work for the Daily Mail until 1969, though he worked for a short time for The Sun covering Paul Rigby and in 1974 he worked for the News of the World producing a weekly cartoon.

== Awards and other work ==
In 1963 Illingworth was invited onto the popular BBC Radio 4 entertainment programme Desert Island Discs choosing a track by Wally Fawkes and his Troglodytes, a jazz band led by a friend and fellow Punch illustrator. Illingworth was voted Political and Social Cartoonist of the year by The Cartoonists' Club of Great Britain in 1962 and in 1966 he was a founding member of the British Cartoonists' Association and became the organisation's first President. In 2009 Illingworth was one of ten people to be commemorated in his birth town of Barry to be awarded a blue plaque. In 2009, Timothy S. Benson published the first biography of Leslie Illingworth entitled 'Illingworth: Political Cartoons from the Daily Mail 1939 - 69'.
