= Tomb of the Unknown Soldier (Canada) =

Tomb at the National War Memorial in Ottawa

Tomb of the Unknown Soldier Tombe du Soldat Inconnu
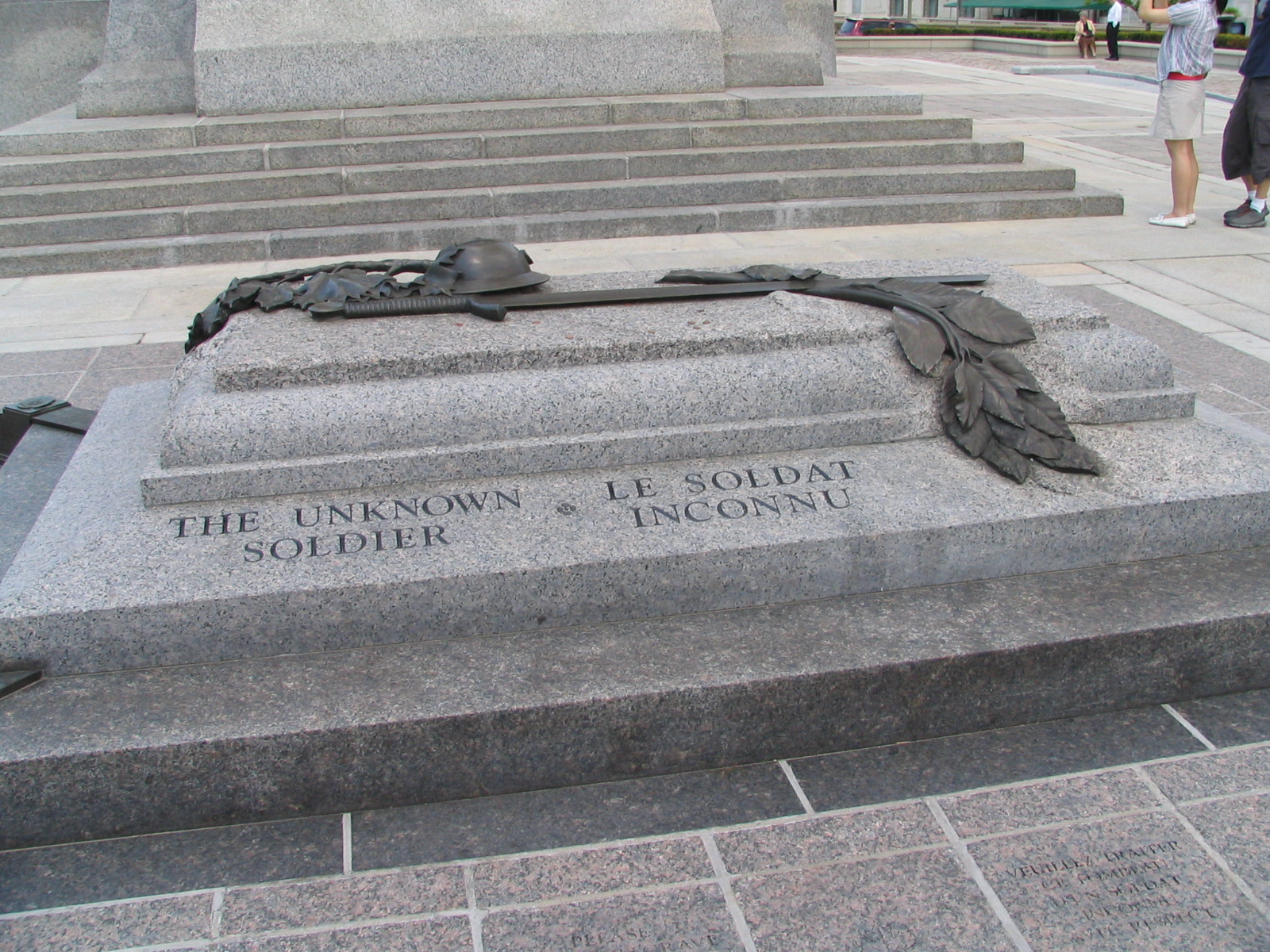
- Canadian Tomb of the Unknown Soldier at Confederation Square
- Interactive map of Tomb of the Unknown Soldier; Tombe du Soldat Inconnu
- Location: Ottawa, Ontario, Canada
- Coordinates: 45°25′26.53″N 75°41′43.79″W
- Designer: Public Works and Government Services Canada, Mary-Ann Liu
- Type: War memorial
- Material: Granite and bronze
- Length: 3.5 metres (11 feet)
- Width: 2.5 metres (8.2 feet)
- Height: 1 metre (3.3 feet)
- Opening date: May 28, 2000
- Dedicated to: All persons who served and did not return home

The Tomb of the Unknown Soldier (French: Tombe du Soldat Inconnu) is a tomb situated before the National War Memorial in Confederation Square, Ottawa, Ontario. The tomb is dedicated to Canadian service members, and holds the remains of an unidentified Canadian soldier who died in France during the First World War; selected from a Commonwealth War Grave near Vimy, in the vicinity where the Battle of Vimy Ridge took place. A similar memorial was installed in June of 2024 at the National War Memorial in St. John's, Newfoundland and Labrador to contain the unidentified remains of a soldier of the Royal Newfoundland Regiment who fought in the First World War.

A tomb with an unidentified soldier was added to the National War Memorial in 2000, the culmination of a project begun by the Royal Canadian Legion. Since 2007, the Canadian Armed Forces have posted sentries at the tomb, and the National War Memorial, from April to November.

== Unknown soldier ==
At the request of the Royal Canadian Legion, the Canadian government became part of the project of creating a tomb of the unknown soldier for Canada, as part of the Canada Millennium Partnership Program. The Cabinet asked the Commonwealth War Graves Commission to select one of the 1,603 graves of unknown Canadians buried in the vicinity of Vimy Ridge. Chosen was Grave 7, in Row E of Plot 8 of the Cabaret-Rouge British Cemetery in Souchez, France, near the memorial at Vimy Ridge, the site of the first major battle where all four Canadian divisions fought together as a combined force. The remains of the soldier buried there were exhumed on the morning of May 16, 2000, and the coffin was flown in a Canadian Forces aircraft to Ottawa on May 25, accompanied by a 45-person guard of honour, a chaplain, Royal Canadian Legion veterans, and two representatives of Canadian youth. In Ottawa, the unknown soldier lay in state for three days in the Hall of Honour in the Centre Block on Parliament Hill.

On the afternoon of May 28, the body of the unknown soldier was transported to the National War Memorial on a horse-drawn Royal Canadian Mounted Police (RCMP) gun carriage. Governor General Adrienne Clarkson, her husband, and Prime Minister Jean Chrétien, as well as veterans, Canadian Forces personnel, and members of the RCMP, were in the funeral cortege. Then, with full military honours before a crowd of 20,000, the body, in a silver maple casket, was re-interred in a sarcophagus in front of the war memorial. Legionnaires placed a handful of soil from each of Canada's provinces and territories, as well as from the soldier's former grave site, on the casket before the tomb was sealed.

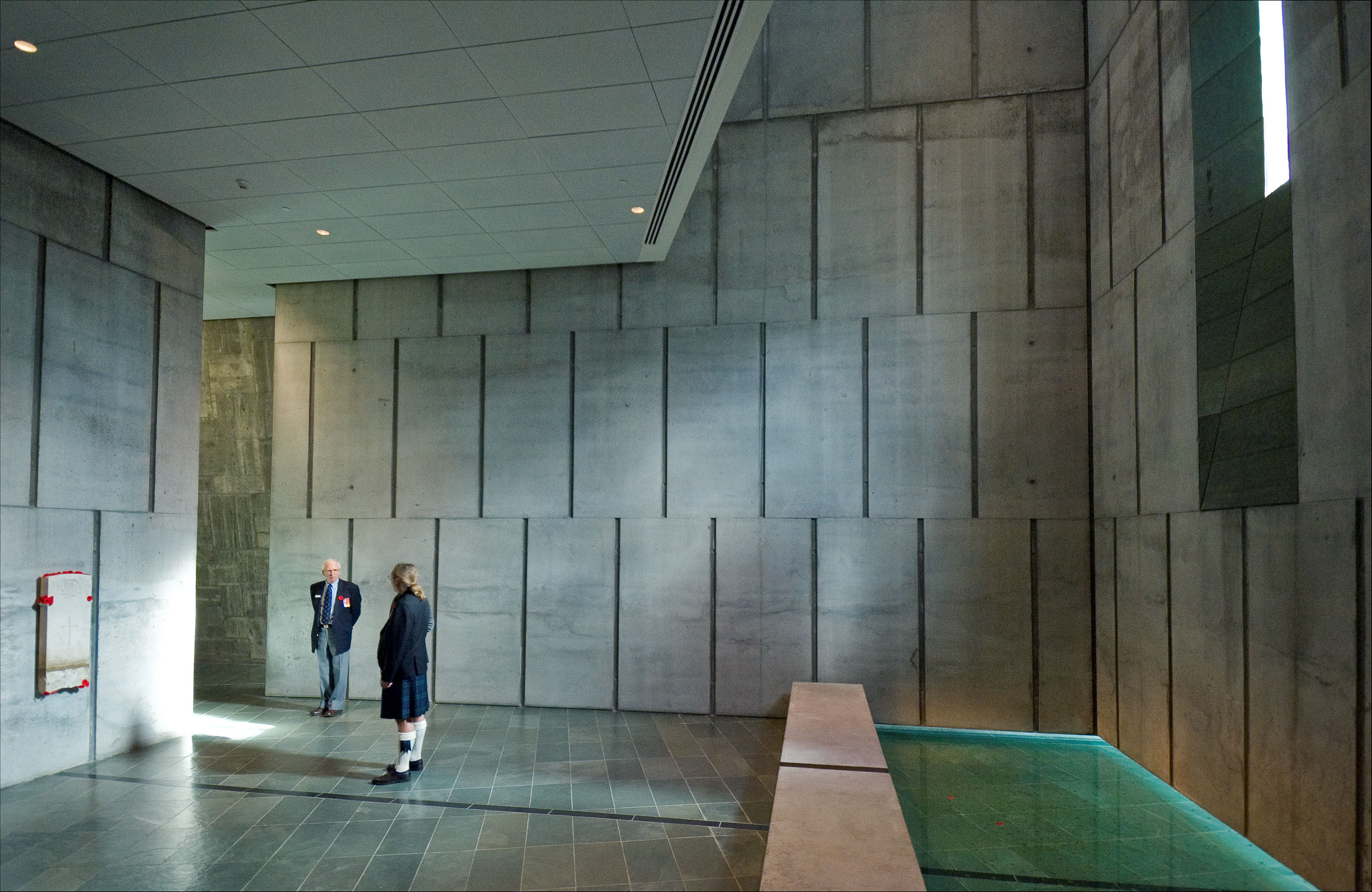
Memorial Hall at the Canadian War Museum, with the original headstone for the unknown soldier in the left foreground

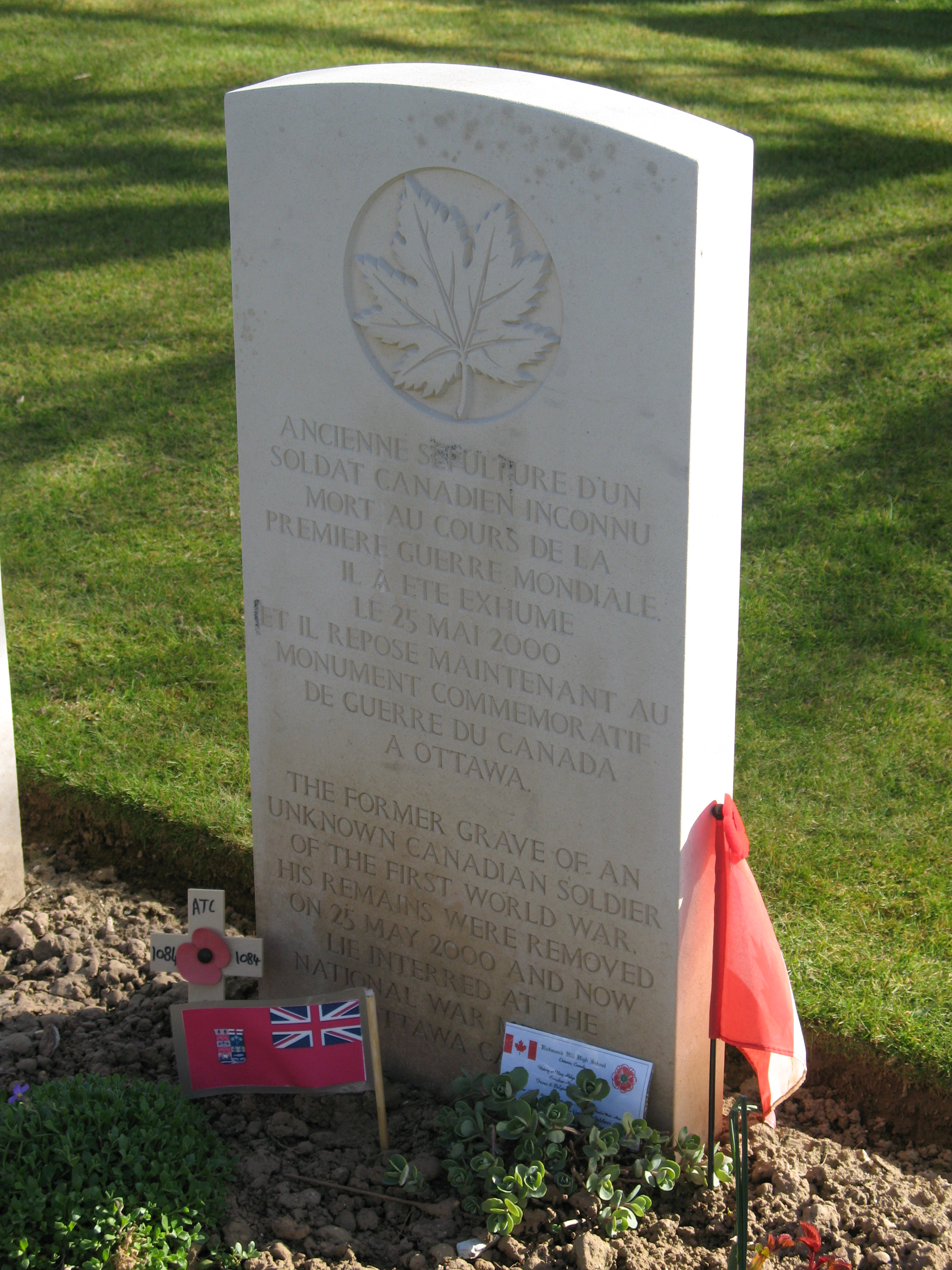
Grave marker placed at the former grave of the unknown soldier

The original headstone of the unknown soldier is the sole artifact and the focal point of the Memorial Hall exhibit within the Canadian War Museum. The hall was designed in such a way that sunlight will only frame the headstone once each year on the 11th of November at 11:00 am. At the former burial site of the unknown soldier, a grave marker similar to the other headstones in the Cabaret-Rouge Cemetery was placed at the now-empty grave. It is inscribed with these words:

ANCIENNE SÉPULTURE D'UN
SOLDAT CANADIEN INCONNU
MORT AU COURS DE LA
PREMIÈRE GUERRE MONDIALE.
IL A ÉTÉ EXHUMÉ
LE 25 MAI 2000
ET IL REPOSE MAINTENANT AU
MONUMENT COMMÉMORATIF
DE GUERRE DU CANADA
À OTTAWA

THE FORMER GRAVE OF AN
UNKNOWN CANADIAN SOLDIER
OF THE FIRST WORLD WAR.
HIS REMAINS WERE REMOVED
ON 25 MAY 2000 AND NOW
LIE INTERRED AT THE
NATIONAL WAR MEMORIAL
IN OTTAWA CANADA.

== Tomb ==
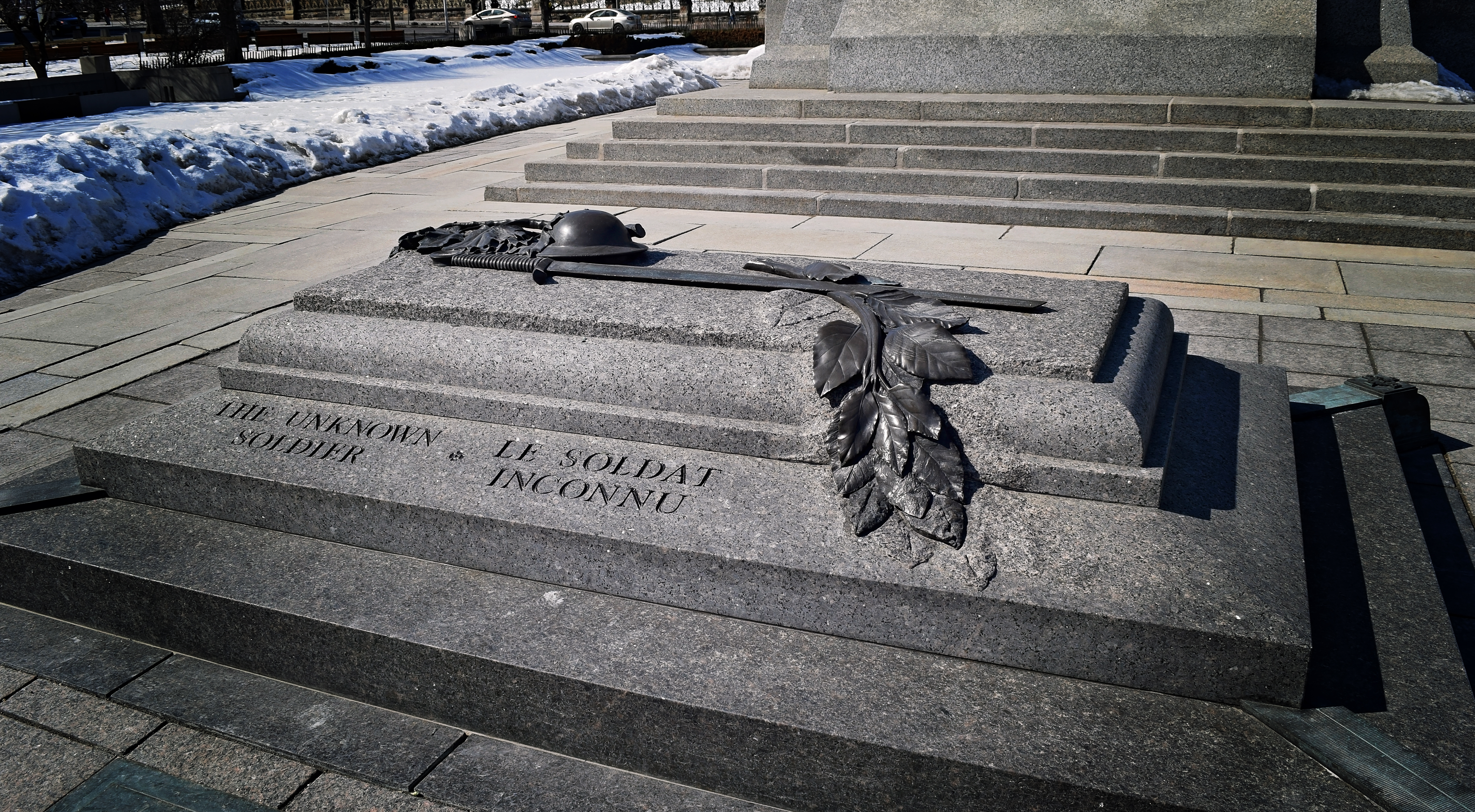
The tomb is adorned with a bronze helmet, sword, and the branches of laurels and maple leaves.

The tomb is intended to honour the approximately 116,000 Canadians who died in combat, as well as all members of the Canadian Armed Forces—in all branches—who died or may die in all conflicts, past, present, and future. It is 3.5 metres (11 feet) long, 2.5 metres (8.2 feet) wide, and 1 metre (3.3 feet) high and built of Caledonia granite, originally quarried in Rivière-à-Pierre, Quebec, with a bronze relief sculpture and four bronze corner pieces. The granite was selected for its colour—matching that of the war memorial. The bronze work—showing a medieval sword, a First World War helmet, and branches of maple and laurel leaves (symbolizing both victory and death)—was designed by Canadian artist Mary-Ann Liu and cast in Roberts Creek, British Columbia. Three of the corner pieces show the different variants of the Memorial Cross during the reigns of three Canadian monarchs since the cross' inception—George V, George VI, and Elizabeth II—while the fourth is a poppy.

The design, chosen by a committee from six submissions by Canadian artists, reflects some of the themes and style of the Vimy Memorial, designed by Walter Seymour Allward. The site is maintained by Public Works and Government Services Canada.

The tomb has become a focal point at all commemorative events at the National War Memorial. At the first Remembrance Day following the tomb's installation, what became a tradition started spontaneously as attendees placed their poppies on the tomb. This act expanded to include the leaving of cut flowers, photographs, or letters to the deceased. The spontaneous display of respect has also carried over to Canada Day when the public leaves small, paper national flags on the tomb.

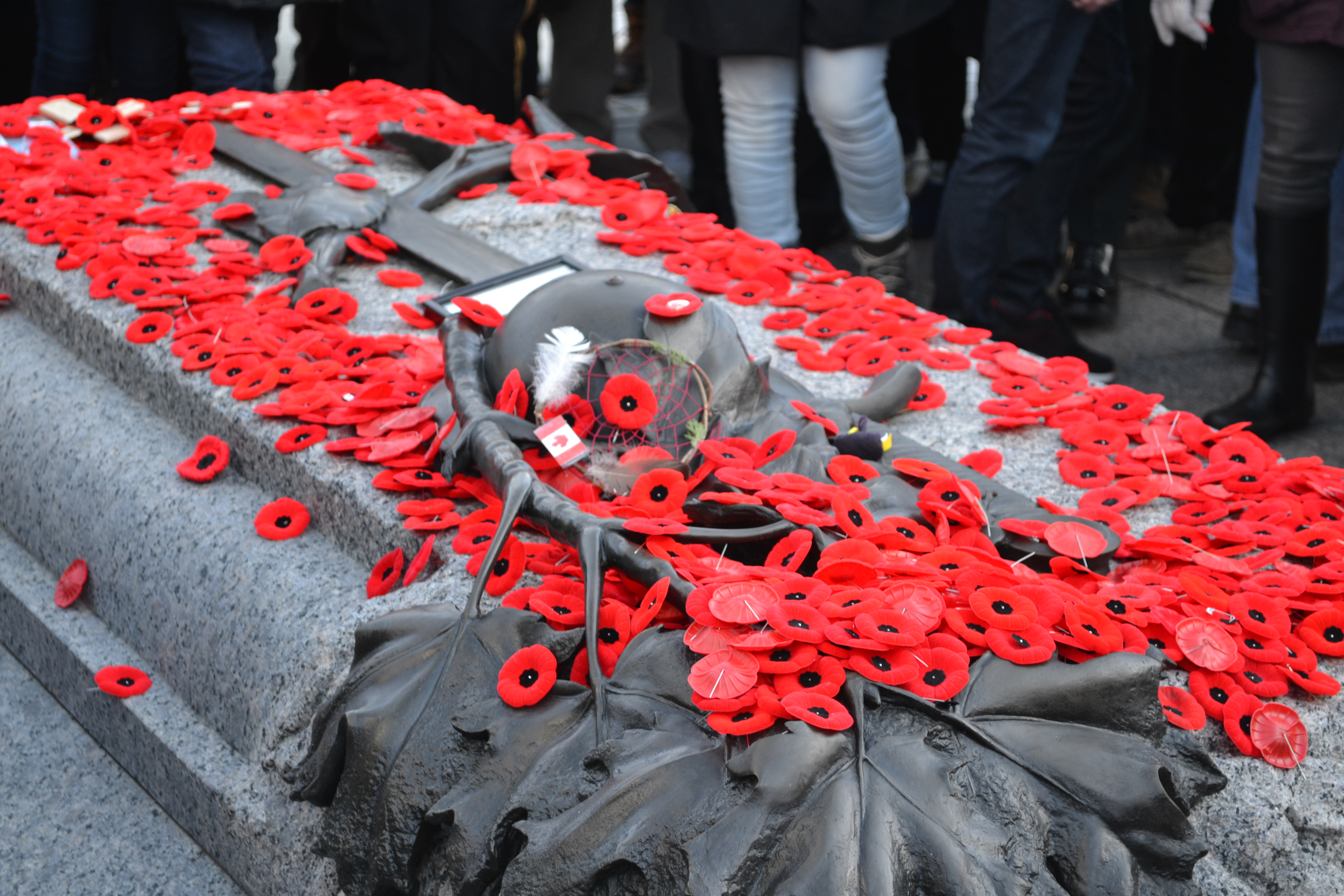
The tomb covered with remembrance poppies during Remembrance Day

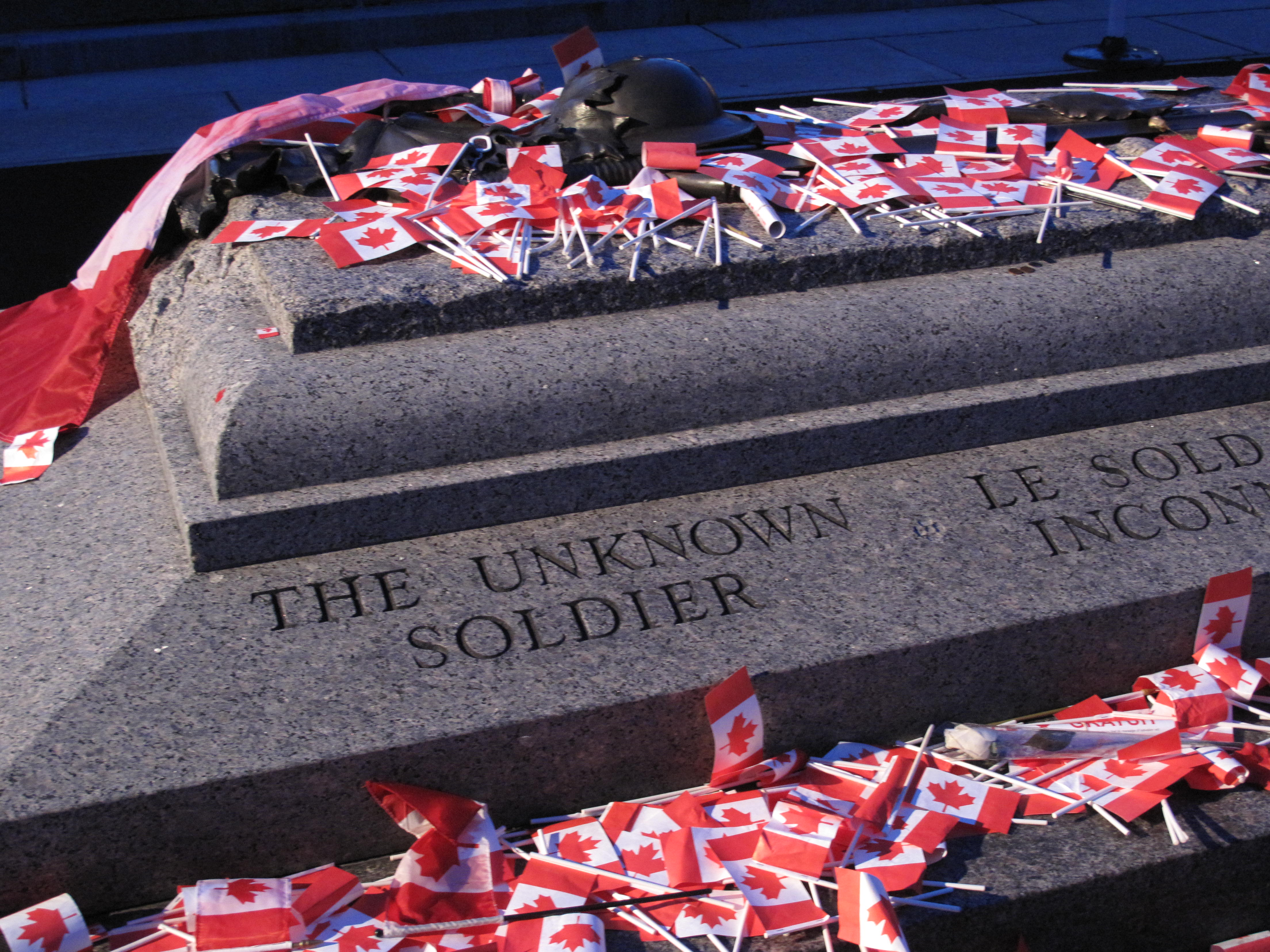
The tomb covered with paper flags of Canada during Canada Day

The Royal Canadian Legion commissioned in 2001 a small work of art on the theme of the Tomb of the Unknown Soldier by André Gauthier.

== Sentries ==
Since 2007, a pair of sentries from the Ceremonial Guard, in full dress uniform and with unloaded weapons, have been stationed at the tomb, on rotation from 9 am to 5 pm. Originally, the programme ran only through July and August. This was expanded in 2014 to run from April 9 (the date of the start of the Battle of Vimy Ridge) to November 10, as well as during significant military anniversaries throughout the rest of the year.

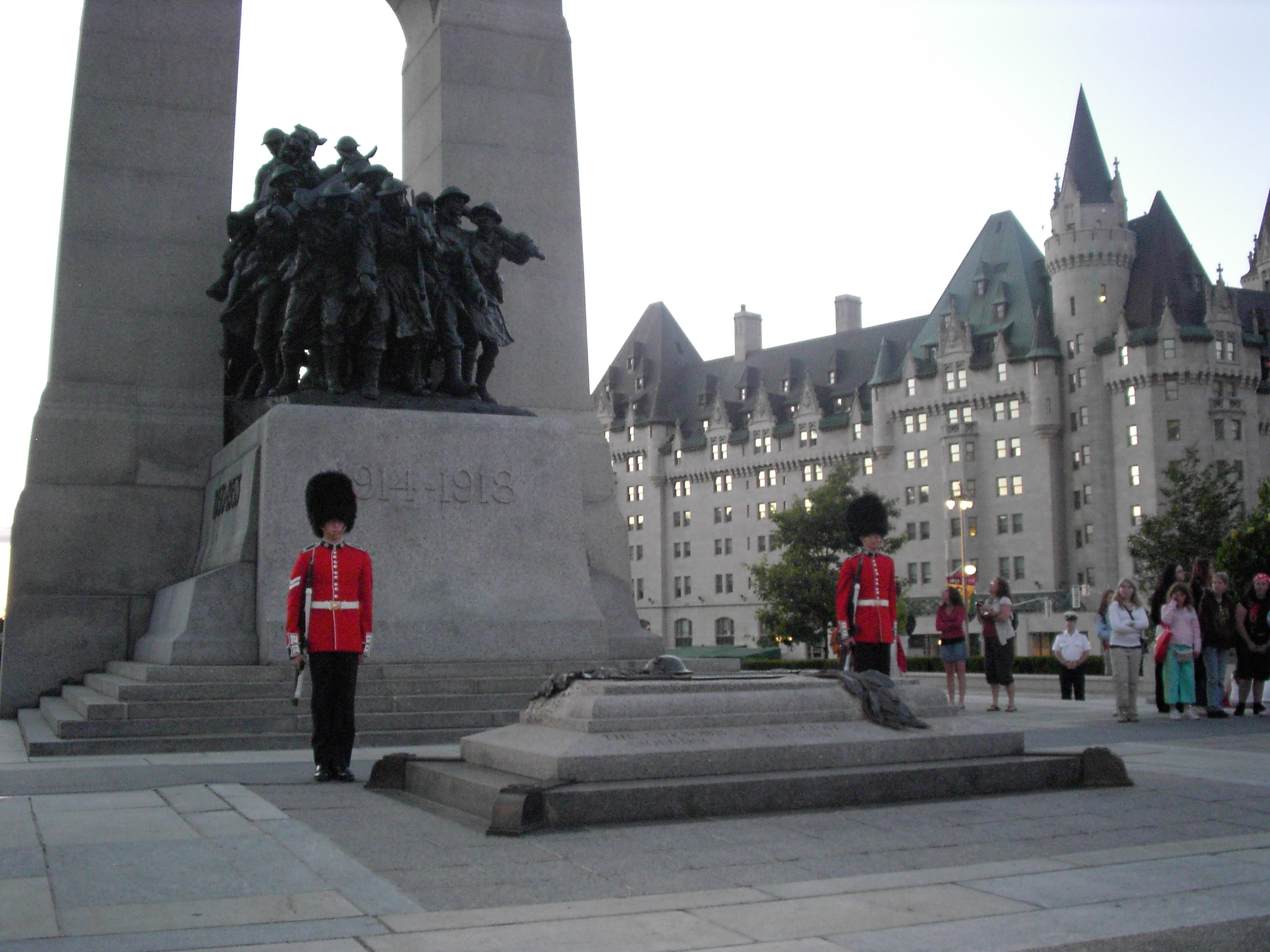
Sentries from the Ceremonial Guard stand next to the tomb. The National War Memorial is situated behind the sentries.

Each morning, the first sentries are marched out with a duty piper and, upon taking their posts, are read their orders by the posting non-commissioned officer: both are ordered to stand at ease, weapon held diagonally in front of the body with the left hand over the right, head up, and feet 30 inches apart. Sentries hold their post for one hour before being replaced, though, a sentry may stand for two shifts in a day. Sentries on duty may march their beat, which consists of the senior sentry giving a preemptive order which is then repeated and acknowledged by the other sentry. There are two-three pause between each movement, both sentries then come to attention at shoulder arms, take one pace forward, turn outwards, and start marching their beat of nine paces. At the ninth pace, both execute an about-turn and return to their original position, if a halt is signalled. Marching the beat can continue for the full hour if desired. Sentries may not interact with the public.

As the Ceremonial Guard is drawn from all branches of the Canadian Forces (the units chosen via an established rotation), the sentries, too, can be members of the Canadian Army, Royal Canadian Navy, or Royal Canadian Air Force, as well as the Special Operations Command. The commanding officer of each unit decides who will be sent to Ottawa. Occasionally, members of a police force will act as sentries at the tomb, such as when officers from the Royal Canadian Mounted Police did so on July 5, 2013, to honour Sergeant Arthur Richardson, a member of the North-West Mounted Police, who earned the Victoria Cross serving with Lord Strathcona's Horse during the Second Boer War.

== Incidents ==
=== 2006 urination incident ===
The Royal Canadian Legion leadership opined that the tomb deserved a military or police guard as a symbol of respect and to protect it from vandalism and desecration. These demands were brought into focus on the night of July 1, 2006, when Dr. Michael Pilon, a retired Canadian Forces major, photographed three young men urinating on the war memorial shortly after the annual Canada Day fireworks show over nearby Parliament Hill. In the summer of 2007, the sentry programme was instituted.

=== 2014 shootings at Parliament Hill ===
On October 22, 2014, a man armed with a rifle shot at the sentries on duty at the tomb, fatally wounding Corporal Nathan Cirillo of The Argyll and Sutherland Highlanders of Canada (Princess Louise's), before proceeding across the street and into the Centre Block on nearby Parliament Hill. There, the shooter engaged in a firefight with Sergeant-at-Arms of the House of Commons Kevin Vickers and members of the Royal Canadian Mounted Police, which ended when he was killed by RCMP Constable Curtis Barrett.

=== 2022 convoy protests ===
On the weekend of January 29, 2022, individuals participating in the Canada convoy protest against COVID-19 mandates danced on the statue, on the tomb, and parked vehicles on the surrounding grounds. The incident was criticized by military officials, politicians, and the Private Motor Truck Council of Canada.

== See also ==
- Canadian war memorials
- Military history of Canada
- Tomb of the Unknown Soldier
