= Adrienne Clarkson =

Governor General of Canada from 1999 to 2005

The Right Honourable Adrienne Clarkson PC CC CMM COM CD FRSC(hon) FRAIC(hon) FRCPSC(hon)
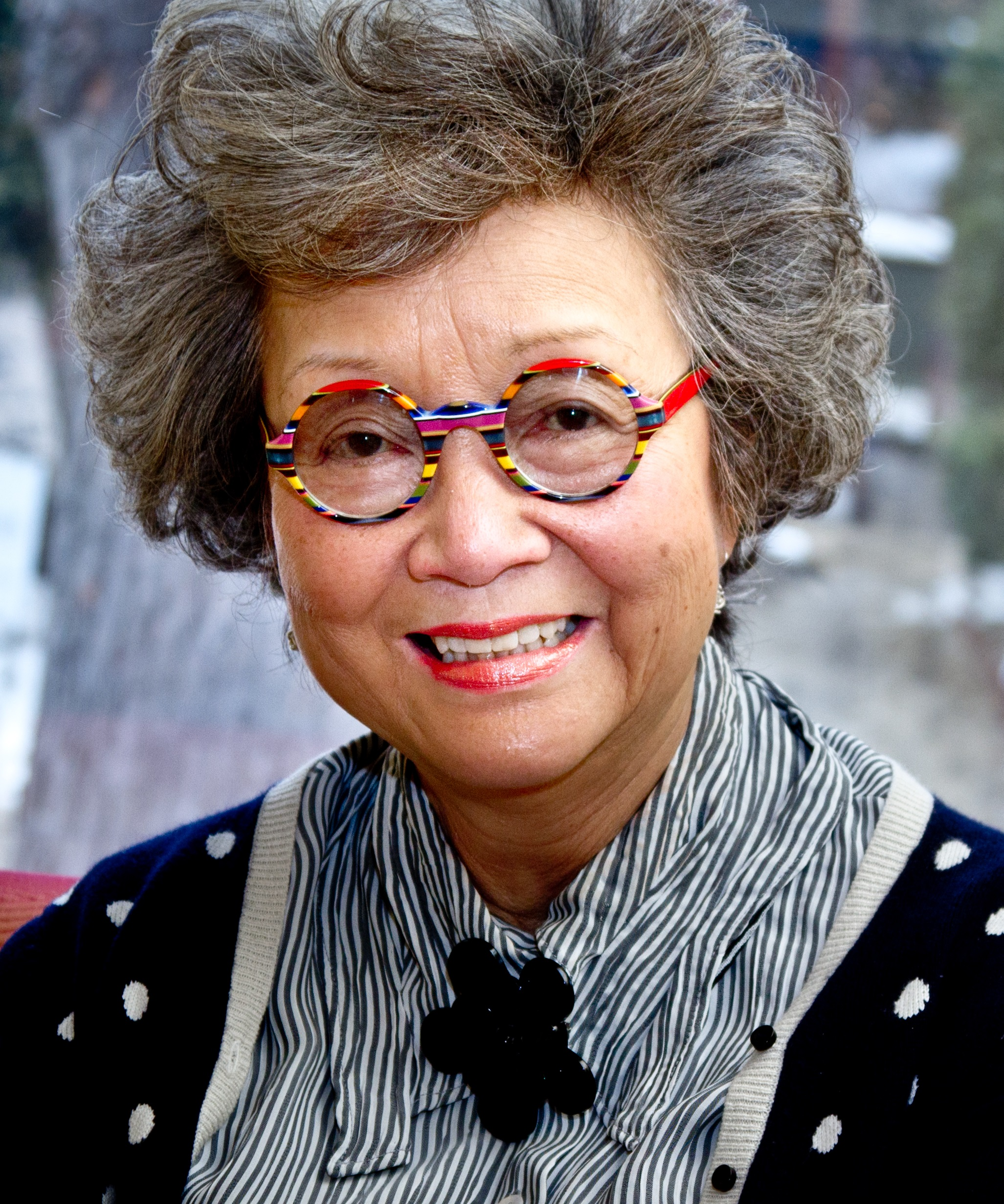
- Clarkson in 2011

26th Governor General of Canada
- In office October 7, 1999 – September 27, 2005
- Monarch: Elizabeth II
- Prime Minister: Jean Chrétien; Paul Martin
- Preceded by: Roméo LeBlanc
- Succeeded by: Michaëlle Jean

Personal details
- Born: Adrienne Louise Poy; February 10, 1939 (age 87) Victoria, Hong Kong
- Spouses: Stephen Clarkson (m. 1963; div. 1975); John Ralston Saul (m. 1999)
- Children: 3
- Parent: William Poy (father)
- Education: University of Toronto; University of Paris
- Profession: Journalist

Chinese name
- Chinese: 伍冰枝
- Hanyu Pinyin: Wǔ Bīngzhī
- Jyutping: Ng^{5} Bing^{1}-zi^{1}

Adrienne Louise Clarkson (Chinese: 伍冰枝; née Poy; born February 10, 1939) is a Canadian journalist and stateswoman who served as the 26th governor general of Canada from 1999 to 2005.

Clarkson arrived in Canada with her family in 1941, as a refugee from Japanese-occupied Hong Kong, and was raised in Ottawa. After receiving a number of university degrees, Clarkson worked as a producer and broadcaster for the Canadian Broadcasting Corporation (CBC) and a journalist for various magazines. Her first diplomatic posting came in the early 1980s, when she promoted Ontarian culture in France and other European countries. In 1999, she was appointed Governor General by Queen Elizabeth II, on the recommendation of Prime Minister of Canada Jean Chrétien, to replace Roméo LeBlanc as viceroy, a post which she occupied until 2005, when she was succeeded by Michaëlle Jean. While Clarkson's appointment as the Canadian vicereine was generally welcomed at first, she caused some controversy during her time serving as the Queen's representative, mostly due to costs incurred in the operation of her office, as well as a somewhat anti-monarchist attitude toward the position.

On October 3, 2005, Clarkson was sworn into the Queen's Privy Council for Canada. She subsequently published her memoirs, founded the Institute for Canadian Citizenship, and became Colonel-in-Chief of Princess Patricia's Canadian Light Infantry.

== Early life and education ==
Clarkson is a Chinese Canadian whose ancestry lies from the Taishanese (paternal line) and Hakka (maternal line) peoples in Guangdong, China. Her paternal grandfather (伍培; ng5 pui4; Wǔ Péi) immigrated in the late 19th century to Chiltern, Australia. There, he operated a general store called Willie Ah Poy Fruitier and Confectioner, Ah Poy being his name in the vocative, based on the Taishanese pronunciation, and what Australian immigration officials heard Poy enunciate in response to their request for his name. Poy's first son, William, was born in Victoria but was later sent back to Taishan, from where he made his way to Hong Kong. There, he worked with his father for the Canadian government and met and married Ethel Poy, with whom he had two children: Neville, born October 29, 1934, and Adrienne, born February 10, 1939. The elder went on to become a plastic surgeon in Toronto and married Vivienne Lee, who herself became a Senator.

Clarkson describes one of her earliest memories as that of hiding in several Hong Kong basements during the Japanese invasion of the territory in 1941. It was only through his Canadian government connections that her father gained his family the opportunity in 1942 to flee the occupation to Canada, as part of the repatriating of Canadian government staff from the fallen city. Even so, the Chinese Immigration Act, 1923, prevented the Poys' immediate entry into the country until the Department of External Affairs intervened and cited an unfilled quota in the prisoner of war exchange programme with the Japanese Imperial Forces that would permit the Poy family free passage into Canada. The family settled in Ottawa, though William had lost almost all of his substantial fortune, and the Poys lived in a cramped duplex. Clarkson attended public school in the city and, in October 1951, was lined up with her class to see Princess Elizabeth, Duchess of Edinburgh (later Queen Elizabeth II), as the royal motorcade passed through the city.

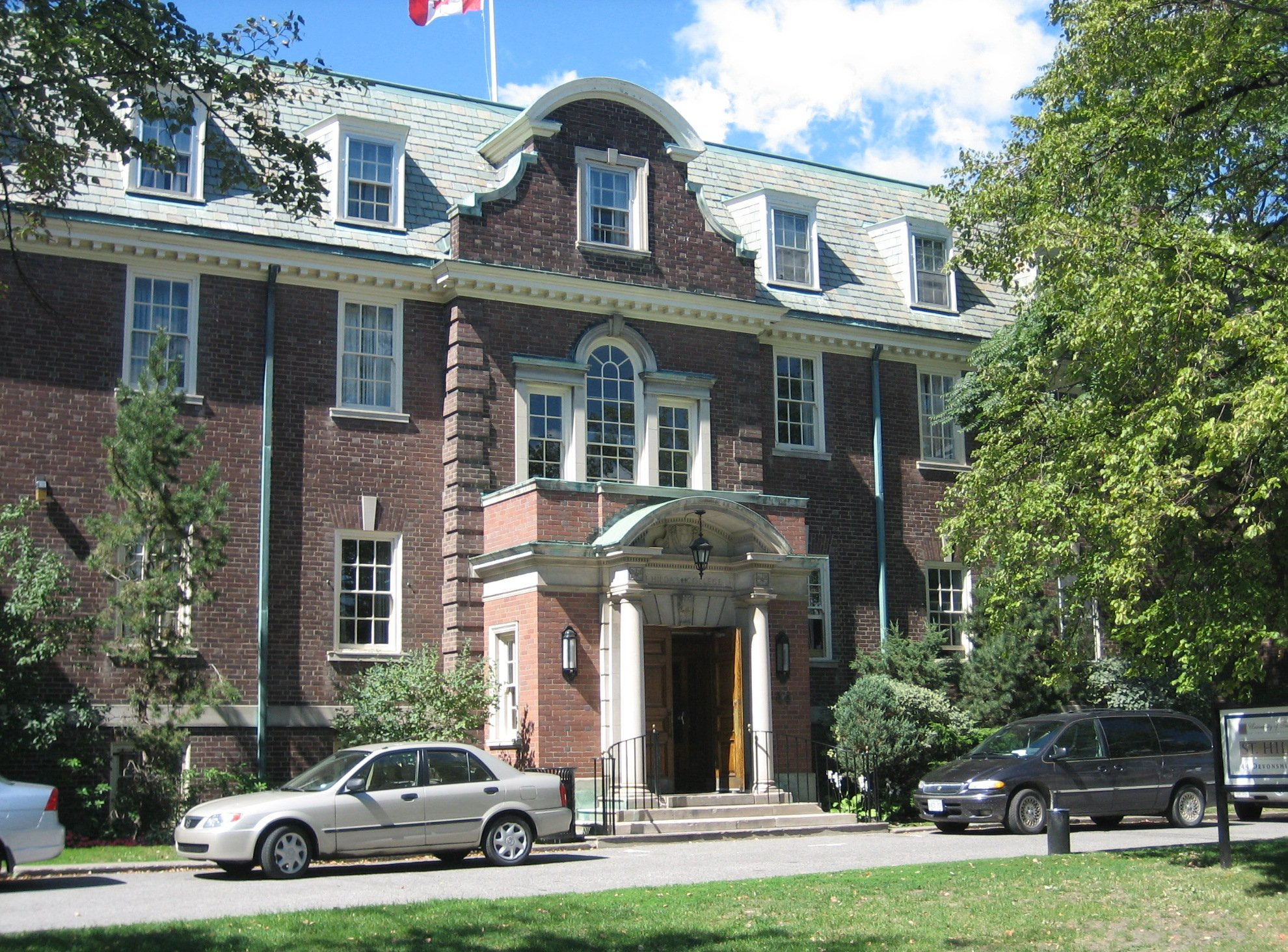
St. Hilda's College, the women's college at the University of Toronto's Trinity College, where Clarkson enrolled in 1956

Clarkson graduated from Lisgar Collegiate Institute in 1956, afterwards enrolling at the University of Toronto's Trinity College. During her time there, Clarkson won a Governor General's Medal in English before graduating in 1960 with a Bachelor of Arts degree with honours in the subject, and then travelling with her parents to East and Southeast Asia. Clarkson went on to obtain her master's degree in English literature, also at the University of Toronto. She began post-graduate work in 1962, at the Sorbonne in Paris, France, with a thesis on the poems of George Meredith.

== Journalism ==
After being introduced by a college friend in 1965 to the producers of Take 30—an afternoon variety show run by the Canadian Broadcasting Corporation (CBC)—Clarkson was hired by the Crown corporation as a freelance book reviewer. This marked the start of her nearly 30-year career with the CBC, as, after less than a year in her initial position, Clarkson was promoted to co-host, thus becoming one of the first members of a visible minority to obtain a prominent position on Canadian television. She remained with Take 30 for a decade, while also branching into print journalism by becoming a regular contributor to such publications as Maclean's and Chatelaine. Similarly, Clarkson wrote and published her own romantic fiction novels: A Lover More Condoling in 1968, and Hunger Trace in 1970. Beyond these, her non-fiction book True to You in My Fashion: A Woman Talks to Men About Marriage—a collection of interviews with men on the subject of divorce—was published in 1971, during which time her first marriage had hit a hard patch.

In 1974, Clarkson began her own public affairs television show Adrienne at Large, though this was not particularly successful and lasted less than four months. The series did, however, allow her to travel extensively outside of Canada, as she recorded segments for the show in locations such as South Africa (where she interviewed Nadine Gordimer and Helen Suzman), and her native Hong Kong. With the cancellation of the show, the CBC created in 1975 the hard journalism programme The Fifth Estate as a means for meeting Canadian content requirements. Clarkson was brought on to co-host with Warner Troyer for the first season, but, due to persistent problems between the two, Troyer left the series, leaving Clarkson to host with Peter Reilly and Eric Malling thereafter. She focused on investigative journalism and gained prominence after an in-depth study of the McCain family's business practices led a Senator to publicly accuse her of being un-naturalised.

After winning several ACTRA Awards, Clarkson ended her job with The Fifth Estate in 1983 and was subsequently appointed by the Lieutenant Governor of Ontario, John Black Aird, on the advice of his Premier, William Davis, as the Agent General for Ontario in France, acting in this role as a cultural liaison between the province and the country, as well as promoting Ontario in several other European states. After five years at this post, she returned to private business, becoming president and publisher of McClelland and Stewart, at a time when the publisher was in financial difficulty. Clarkson was not only unsuccessful at improving the company's fiscal problems, she was also highly unpopular with employees, and resigned herself after 18 months that saw several protest resignations; the imprint Adrienne Clarkson Books does, however, remain with McClelland and Stewart.

Clarkson opted to return to television, hosting through mid-1988 Adrienne Clarkson Summer Festival, which became popular enough to be picked up and repackaged as Adrienne Clarkson Presents, an arts show that was critically acclaimed, but which never received high ratings. After four years of hosting the show, Clarkson was appointed as an Officer of the Order of Canada for her long media career, which included hosting more than 3,500 television programmes, as well as assisting charitable organisations, such as the Kidney Foundation of Canada, Horizons of Canada, and International PEN. Further, as host and executive producer of Adrienne Clarkson Presents, she received numerous Gemini Award nominations—winning in 1993 for best host in a light information, variety, or performing arts programme or series—and was the 1995 recipient of the Donald Brittain Award, a special honour given every year for the best social/political documentary programme. In the same year, she also won a Gémeaux Award (the French language equivalent of a Gemini) for Adrienne Clarkson Presents. Her precise diction and sometimes haughty demeanour did sometimes become the occasional subject of satire, however; most famously in the CBC Radio series Double Exposure, where co-creator Linda Cullen mimicked Clarkson with the line: "I'm Adrienne Clarkson, and you're not" (derived from Chevy Chase's early Saturday Night Live refrain).

Throughout the 1990s—during which time she also wrote and produced films, such as The Lust In His Eye: Visions of James Wilson Morrice and Borduas and Me and Artemisia—there was much speculation that Clarkson would soon be given a high level appointment by the Queen-in-Council. This was finally realized in 1995 when Prime Minister Jean Chrétien and then Minister of Canadian Heritage Michel Dupuy advised Governor General Roméo LeBlanc to appoint Clarkson as chair of the board of the Canadian Museum of Civilization, and later, to the Canadian War Museum as well, all while she continued to host her show. It was during this time that the War Museum announced the decision to build the structure which now houses its collection, and which Clarkson opened as Governor General in May 2005.

== Governor General of Canada ==
Clarkson was the first visible minority and refugee to be appointed governor general, and the second woman (after Jeanne Sauvé), the first Chinese Canadian, and the first without a military or political background. She was also the second person to have been appointed to the Order of Canada prior to nomination as governor general-designate, after Jules Léger. Clarkson brought with her a new approach to the governor generalcy, and dedicated much of her self-imposed mandate to drawing national attention to Northern Canada.

=== As governor general-designate ===
It was on September 8, 1999, announced from the Office of the Prime Minister of Canada that Queen Elizabeth II had approved Prime Minister Jean Chrétien's choice of Clarkson to succeed Roméo LeBlanc as the Queen's representative. The commission appointing Clarkson was issued on September 28 under the royal sign-manual and Great Seal of Canada. At the time of the announcement of her appointment, it was revealed that, with Clarkson being accompanied to Rideau Hall by her longtime partner, John Ralston Saul, the official appointment would be bringing an unofficial pair to the viceregal post, in that the governor general would not be the only person actively exploring Canadian theory and culture.

=== In office ===
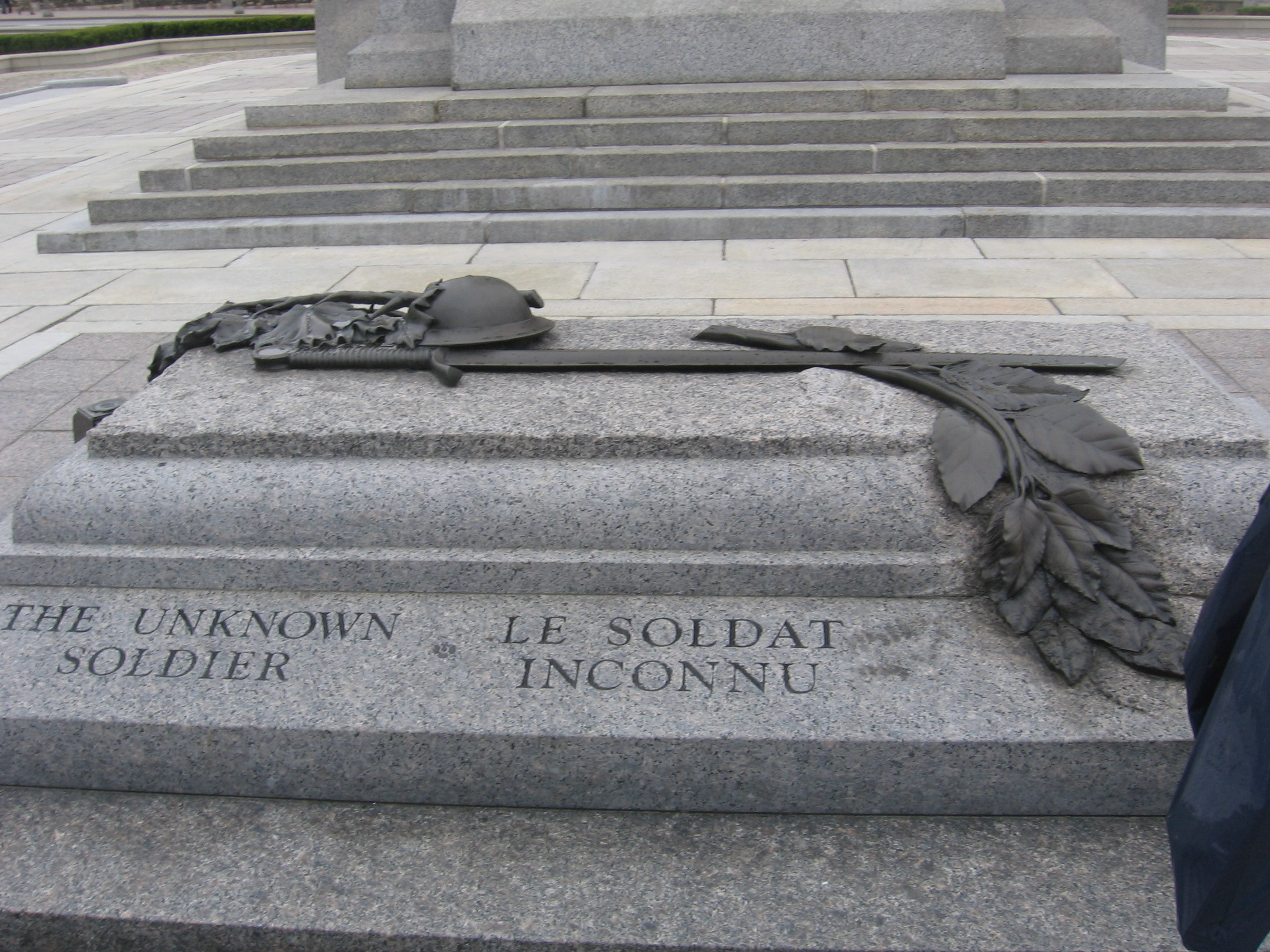
The Canadian Tomb of the Unknown Soldier, in the creation of which Clarkson assisted, and which she dedicated in May 2000

==== Bond with the military ====
On October 8, 1999, Clarkson was sworn in as the 26th Governor General of Canada, and was soon actively participating in her role, becoming immediately instrumental in the final stages of the repatriation of Canada's unknown soldier from France. Her eulogy read at the tomb's dedication ceremony on May 28, 2000, was described by the Royal Canadian Legion as "powerful", and led journalist John Fraser to state: "You have to go back pretty far to find anyone who stirred national emotions the way Clarkson did with her magnificent speech..." In the same vein, after a decade of inaction on the part of the Cabinet, Clarkson moved to have Princess Patricia's Canadian Light Infantry honoured with the Commander-in-Chief's Unit Commendation, on behalf of the Queen, beginning a long relationship between Clarkson and the regiment.

Following the terrorist attacks United States on September 11, 2001, Clarkson praised Operation Yellow Ribbon, saying "communities across the country selflessly opened their homes and hearts to stranded air travellers", and, on September 14, 2001, presided over a memorial service on Parliament Hill for the victims of the attacks, which was attended by over 100,000 people—the largest single vigil ever seen in Canada's capital. On her cabinet's advice, Clarkson subsequently dispatched Canadian soldiers to assist in the invasion of Afghanistan, and, in her role of representing the Queen as commander-in-chief of the Canadian Forces, visited in 2002 the Canadian troops serving in the Afghan theatre. This trip, plus similar ones she undertook during her tenure—such as those to Kosovo to meet with Canadian troops, to the Persian Gulf to spend Christmas with members of the Armed Forces on a Canadian destroyer, and again to Afghanistan to spend New Year's with Canadian soldiers—won her acclaim for being the first governor general since at least 1945 to take seriously the duties associated with the commander-in-chief title, which was credited for helping to boost pride in the Canadian Forces.

==== More robust viceregal office ====
Clarkson took a proactive role in increasing the stature of the Canadian viceregal office, travelling widely, hosting lavish state events, and hosting conferences and forums. However, criticism soon ensued over the way her office was spending Crown funds, as, during her tenure, expenditures at Rideau Hall increased 200%; the budget for 2003 was estimated at CAD$41 million. Part of this increase was due to accounting reasons; some costs that had previously been worked into the budgets of ministries were transferred to the governor general's office. But, the event that the media mostly focused on was Clarkson's 2003, 19-day circumpolar "northern identity" tour, which included state visits to Russia, Finland, and Iceland, and the attendance of 50 other Canadians prominent in the fields of arts, culture, and science. In an atmosphere tainted by several spending scandals in the government, the trip's estimated CAD$1 million cost was attacked as a waste of money. All together, this resulted in some politicians calling for the role of the governor general to be reduced or even for the position to be eliminated, and a poll taken late in 2003 found a majority of respondents thought Clarkson was "too grand" for the office. In an unprecedented move for a vicereine, Clarkson, and not her ministers, personally addressed the controversy, explaining that she had been asked to undertake the state visits by her prime minister. Still, though the Office of the Governor General defended the tour as successful, particularly with regard to the warm reception Clarkson received in Russia and during her meeting with Russian president Vladimir Putin, and it was the Department of Foreign Affairs that commissioned and paid for the trip with funds approved by parliament. When the end cost for the trips came in at CAD$5 million, a scheduled continuation of the tour that would have included visits to Sweden, Denmark, Norway, and Greenland was scrapped by the federal government in early 2004. John Fraser later stated Prime Minister Paul Martin left Clarkson to defend herself because he "clearly didn't like her very much" and "even if it was Madam Clarkson's (and John Ralston Saul's) own imaginative idea, it had been officially supported by the government, and no appointed high official should ever be abandoned like that. Not only should she have been defended publicly, we were made to look foolish in the eyes of the countries who had to be informed that the trip to such great allies as Sweden, Norway and Denmark (plus its province of Greenland) was called off".

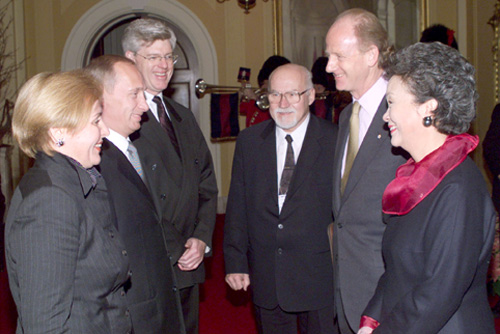
Clarkson and John Ralston Saul (at right) greet the President of Russia Vladimir Putin and his wife, Lyudmila Putina, at Rideau Hall, December 18, 2000

From that time on, Clarkson and her office faced intense scrutiny. By November 2004, it was announced that Clarkson's budget would be cut by ten percent, despite the fact that parliament itself had approved her budget each year. Then, in March 2005, she again faced questions about spending after it was reported that she had been advised by Martin to make official visits to Spain, the Netherlands, and Russia in order to attend the state funeral of the victims of the Madrid terrorist bombings, the 60th anniversary of the liberation of the Netherlands, and participate in Victory in Europe Day celebrations in Moscow, respectively. Clarkson waited until less than two weeks after the end of her time serving as governor general before she publicly criticised Jean Chrétien and the Cabinet under his chairmanship for not defending the viceregal office, and reaffirmed that she had been asked by the Department of Foreign Affairs to take each of her state trips in the first place.

At the same time, Clarkson's unorthodox mode of exercising the Office of the Governor General led to negative critiques of how she carried out a number of ceremonial duties. In June 2004, the Governor General and her office were targeted by Canadian monarchists, who noted that, prior to the ceremony to recognize Canada's involvement at Juno Beach in the D-Day landings of 1944, Government House claimed that Clarkson would be attending as Canada's head of state and, at the event, the Queen, who also attended the ceremony, was relegated to third place in precedence behind Clarkson and Saul. Jack Granatstein alleged that this arrangement had displeased the Queen and "there was fury." Government House later retracted its head of state statement, saying that it was the error of a junior official, but why the protocol was altered was never explained. At Remembrance Day ceremonies, the Governor General also caused a stir when she eschewed the tradition of placing the first wreath at the cenotaph in favour of doing so simultaneously with her husband; a practice that was discontinued by Clarkson's viceregal successor. Then, during a visit to Vancouver in September of the same year, Clarkson was booed and hissed at by a small but vocal group of protesters. She was on a goodwill tour of a poor area of the city; however, the protesters argued that her visit was nothing more than a publicity stunt to try to gain some of her lost popular support to get her time in office extended.

In January 2005, disappointment was further expressed over Clarkson's failure to attend a memorial service for Alberta's late lieutenant governor, Lois Hole. Rideau Hall issued a statement saying the Governor General was, at the time, abroad representing Canada at the inauguration of the President of Ukraine, Victor Yushchenko. However, the inauguration was postponed, and it was felt that Clarkson could have returned to Canada for the service. When it was later reported by the Toronto Sun and The Globe and Mail that Clarkson would wait in Paris, France, for the rescheduled presidential investiture, more outrage was expressed in the press, which was only compounded when Rideau Hall informed the public that the Governor General would also attend a "long-standing engagement" with the Queen at Sandringham House, contradicting reports that Buckingham Palace had said the dinner was actually booked at the last minute. In response, some monarchists began lobbying Clarkson to resign, had she willingly used the Queen for publicity and damage control purposes.

==== Extended tenure ====
Regardless of the controversies, Clarkson was asked, and agreed, to remain in the Queen's service for an additional year beyond the traditional, but not official, five-year period. Though the decision was met with mixed feelings from across the country, Prime Minister Martin had advised the Queen to retain Clarkson as her vicereine in order to provide stability while the country faced potential constitutional difficulties arising from a minority government; there had been speculation at the end of 2004 over whether or not Clarkson would have to become directly involved in politics should the Cabinet led by Paul Martin lose the confidence of the House of Commons, leaving the Governor General to decide whether or not to ask the leader of Her Majesty's Loyal Opposition, then Stephen Harper, to form a government, or to call a general election. Ultimately, circumstances played out so that Clarkson's personal involvement was rendered unnecessary.

Soon after, however, on July 8, 2005, Clarkson was admitted to hospital in Toronto in order to have a pacemaker implanted. She recovered quickly, and returned to her viceregal duties in the same month. To coincide with that year's 50th anniversary of the appointment of the first Canadian-born governor general, Clarkson moved Order of Canada investitures from their typical location in Rideau Hall to various places around the country. Also, on July 23, 2005, Clarkson was inducted as an honorary member of the Kainai Chieftainship, during a traditional ceremony held at Red Crow Park, near Standoff, Alberta, after which she was adopted into the Blood Tribe with the name Grandmother of Many Nations; this made Clarkson the first governor general since Edward Schreyer in 1984 to be made an honorary chief, and only the third woman to be inducted since the creation of the chieftainship. Then, on September 15, 2005, Clarkson announced the creation of the Governor General's Northern Medal, to be awarded annually to a citizen whose actions and achievements had contributed to the evolution and constant reaffirmation of the Canadian North as part of the national identity.

During her last days in office, Clarkson's popularity with the Armed Forces was expressed in a large farewell ceremony mounted by the military; the first ever such send-off for a governor general. Similarly, on the morning of September 26, 2005, Clarkson attended a celebration on Parliament Hill in which Member of Parliament thanked her for her work and presented her with the viceregal flag that flew atop the Peace Tower when Clarkson was present in parliament. Then, following tradition, Clarkson and Saul planted on Rideau Hall's grounds, two ceremonial trees (swamp white oaks) to mark the end of the former's time in office, and the next day, Clarkson's time as vicereine ended when her successor, Michaëlle Jean, was sworn in as Governor General of Canada. However, Clarkson caused yet another controversy when she decided, with Jean's consent, to attend Jean's investiture, marking the first time in more than a century that a governor general had attended the swearing-in of his or her successor.

=== Legacy ===
Clarkson was seen as having brought new life to the post of governor general, receiving praise through her first years in office for being a more modern governor general who brought increased public attention to the position; Michaëlle Jean recognised Clarkson as having "infused the office with a new energy", for "promot[ing] artists and their achievements from across Canada", and for her "close work with aboriginal communities". Clarkson was further praised for her devotion to the armed forces and remembrance, and was credited for breathing new life into the Canadian monarchy as a whole; Mailo' Ken Wiwa stated in The Globe and Mail: "that Adrienne Clarkson, once a refugee, represents the Queen here in Canada is, for me, the singular most important reason for believing that the monarchy is relevant to Canada's emerging identity. Her role may only be ceremonial and symbolic, but as the enduring quality of the Royal Family attests, you can never underestimate the power of myth. Even— or rather, especially— in this iconoclastic age." Clarkson and her husband also travelled across Canada and met more Canadians than any other governor general in Canadian history and, unlike many other state figures, Clarkson also wrote most of her own speeches, which were noted for being simultaneously intellectual and approachable. Clarkson's tenure was also notable for her patronage of all the arts— making such efforts as ensuring the governor general's study at Rideau Hall had copies of every book that had won the Governor General's Awards for literature— and for sports, as demonstrated in her creation on September 14, 2005, of the Clarkson Cup for women's hockey in Canada. John Fraser in 2012 stated of Clarkson: "[N]o one, in the whole history of Rideau Hall, ever evoked the country quite as effectively".

Other summaries of Clarkson's time as governor general, however, found that the increased travel abroad attracted negative attention to the viceregal post over costs and caused conflict between domestic duties and foreign obligations. Also, it was observed that Clarkson had succumbed too easily to the desires of her advisors— both in the prime minister's and Privy Council offices, as well as amongst the staff of Government House— to turn the viceregal post into something it was not: Canada's head of state. Clarkson had expressed admiration for the Queen, was said to understand "the lustre the Crown affords," and to have "shudder[ed] a little in sympathy with members of the Royal Family at the degree of intrusion into their lives they must bear." But the systematic downplaying of the monarch led to confusion over who was head of state and there was a sense that, by taking this view, Clarkson and her office were overturning the long-standing theory that all the viceroys and their respective jurisdictions are equal under a sovereign who reigns consistently over the whole country. When Clarkson attended a provincial occasion, her protocol officers insisted that she take precedence over the pertinent lieutenant governor and denied knowledge of the established order in which the lieutenant governor, as a direct representative of the Queen in a province, takes precedence at a provincial function over all other attendees, save for the monarch. These situations would result in "precedence battles", in which the provincial authorities would frequently acquiesce to pressure and ultimatums from Rideau Hall. Clarkson also took the place of the monarch in presenting to the next vicereine the Chancellor's insignia of the Order of Canada, thereby breaking the order's "first and oldest tradition"; a move Canada's expert on honours, Christopher McCreery, called "a rather bizarre turn of events". The Monarchist League of Canada even reported that a member of parliament had telephoned to ask if they had ever before heard of the eruption of booing at the mention of the governor general's name, as had apparently happened in the MP's riding when Clarkson was spoken about.

== Post-viceregal life ==
After leaving Rideau Hall, Clarkson and Saul purchased a new home in Toronto's the Annex district, taking possession at the end of September 2005. She also signed a deal with Penguin Canada to publish her memoirs in two books. The first, Heart Matters, was published in September 2006, making Clarkson the third former governor general to release an autobiography. (Note: After the Earl Alexander of Tunis and Vincent Massey.) In the first half of the book, Clarkson outlined her childhood in Ottawa and her career in the CBC, while the second half covered her time as governor general, and contained her own positive views of Jean Chrétien and negative views of Paul Martin. The book was met with mixed reviews, however, (Note: Etiquette experts in the United Kingdom chided Clarkson for her condescending criticisms of the Queen's behaviour at a dinner party, and of the Queen Mother for having used different china settings throughout a formal meal, calling Clarkson "prissy", and Rex Murphy deemed Clarkson as hypocritical for claiming a Governor General must adhere to tradition and discretion, all in a book that reveals intimate and judgmental details about certain personages, and released mere months after she left the office.) and her expressed opinion that future nominees for appointment as governor general should be voted on in the House of Commons was condemned by monarchists, though supported by Macleans.

During an October 2006 interview on CBC Newsworld with Don Newman, Clarkson spoke her views on the nature of the position of Governor General of Canada, stating that while the Queen remained popular with Canadians, the governor general was now the direct representative of "the Crown", and not of the monarch, therefore making the viceroy Canada's actual head of state. This was a theory contrary to those of Eugene Forsey, the government of Canada itself, and numerous others, but was in line with Edward McWhinney. Into 2009, Clarkson continued to promote this notion, stating at a constitutional law conference that the governor general embodied the nation and the prime minister's nominee for the viceregal role should thus be vetted by a parliamentary committee, in a similar format to Congressional Confirmation Hearings in the United States. She then went further to say that the candidate should also submit to a televised quiz on Canadiana. Though a University of Toronto political scientist stated this would "strengthen the legitimacy of the governor-general as a non-partisan umpire," the editorial board of the Montreal Gazette said that the position being "not elected is an asset, not a handicap" and Clarkson's process would undermine the impartiality of the viceroy.

On February 7, 2007, Clarkson was appointed by the Queen as Colonel-in-Chief of Princess Patricia's Canadian Light Infantry, replacing the Countess Mountbatten of Burma, and commented that she was "deeply honoured" and proud to accept the role. The ceremony to mark her appointment took place on March 17 at the regimental headquarters in Edmonton. Clarkson is also vice-chair of the board of directors of the dance company La La La Human Steps and, in 2014, was announced as the presenter of that year's Massey Lectures. Her lectures, which were also published in book form, were on the theme of "Belonging: The Paradox of Citizenship".

== Personal life ==
In 1963, Clarkson married Stephen Clarkson, a University of Toronto political science professor. Together, the couple had three daughters: Kyra, born in 1969, and twins Blaise and Chloe, born in 1971; at the age of nine months, however, Chloe died of sudden infant death syndrome. Adrienne and Stephen divorced four years later. Her daughters have been estranged from her and were adopted by Christine McCall, Stephen Clarkson's second wife. Blaise is a family doctor in Toronto and Kyra an architect in New York and since relocated back to Toronto.

Since the 1980s, Clarkson has been in a relationship with Canadian writer and philosopher John Ralston Saul. They married in 1999.

A member of the Church of St. Mary Magdalene, Clarkson is a devout Anglican, as is her entire family going back five generations, with her uncle being a priest in the Anglican Church in Hong Kong. Clarkson chose to attend Trinity College at the University of Toronto because of its Anglican associations, and, while there, she casually dated divinity student Michael Peers, who would later become an archbishop and primate of the Anglican Church of Canada. This friendship was maintained over the years, and Peers presided over Clarkson's marriage to Saul, officiated at her installation as governor general, and presided over the funerals of both her parents. Clarkson is also credited for returning prayer to the viceregal installation ceremony, which had been removed when Roméo LeBlanc was installed in 1995.

Clarkson was admired by the faithful for being open about her religious beliefs during her time in Rideau Hall. In a December 2005 interview with the Anglican Journal, she was quoted as saying about the Anglican elements of her heraldic arms that "I am an Anglican and that is part of my life; that I really feel at home in the Anglican Communion." In this same interview, she criticized conservatives for creating what she called the "deep divide" in the Anglican church regarding homosexuality. Clarkson was also noted for visiting Anglican churches around Canada on her many tours, saying that she enjoyed seeing how the church fit in communities in all parts of Canada. Her public faith, however, was also the cause of controversy: She received particular criticism when she was seen taking communion in a Catholic church since that denomination does not permit open communion.

== Honours ==
Ribbon bars of Adrienne Clarkson

Appointments

- April 30, 1992 – October 8, 1999: Officer of the Order of Canada (OC)
  - October 8, 2000 – September 27, 2005: Chancellor and Principal Companion of the Order of Canada (CC)
  - September 27, 2005 – May 8, 2013: Companion of the Order of Canada (CC)
  - May 8, 2013 –: Extraordinary Companion of the Order of Canada (CC)
- 1999 – : Lay Bencher of the Law Society of Upper Canada
- October 8, 2000 – September 27, 2005: Chancellor and Commander of the Order of Military Merit (CMM)
  - September 27, 2005 – May 8, 2013: Commander of the Order of Military Merit (CMM)
  - May 8, 2013 –: Extraordinary Commander of the Order of Military Merit (CMM)
- October 8, 2000 – September 27, 2005: Dame of Justice, Prior, and Chief Officer in Canada of the Most Venerable Order of the Hospital of Saint John of Jerusalem
  - September 27, 2005 – : Dame of Justice of the Most Venerable Order of the Hospital of Saint John of Jerusalem
- October 8, 2000 – September 27, 2005: Chief Scout of Canada
- 1999 – : Honorary Member of the Royal Military College of Canada Club
- October 3, 2000 – September 27, 2005: Chancellor and Commander of the Order of Merit of the Police Forces (COM)
  - September 27, 2005 – : Commander of the Order of Merit of the Police Forces (COM)
- July 23, 2005 – : Honorary Chief of the Kainai Chieftainship
- October 3, 2005 – : Member of the Queen's Privy Council for Canada (PC)

Medals

- 1960: Governor General's Academic Medal
- 1967: Canadian Centennial Medal
- 1992: Commemorative Medal for the 125th Anniversary of the Confederation of Canada
- October 8, 1999: Canadian Forces' Decoration (CD) with 1 Clasp
- 2002: Queen Elizabeth II Golden Jubilee Medal.
- 4 September 2005: Commemorative Medal for the Centennial of Saskatchewan
- 2012: Queen Elizabeth II Diamond Jubilee Medal.
- March 26, 2019: Gold Medal of the Royal Canadian Geographical Society.

Awards

- 1973: Alliance of Canadian Cinema, Television and Radio Artists ACTRA Award for Best Documentary: The Desert is Dying
- 1974: Alliance of Canadian Cinema, Television and Radio Artists ACTRA Award for Best Public Affairs Broadcaster
- 1976: Alliance of Canadian Cinema, Television and Radio Artists Gordon Sinclair Award for Integrity in Broadcasting
- 1982: Alliance of Canadian Cinema, Television and Radio Artists ACTRA Award for Best Host-Interviewer
- 1993: Academy of Canadian Cinema and Television Gemini Award for Best Host in Performing Arts Series
- 1993: Canadian Broadcasting Corporation Prix Anik for Best Entertainment Series: Adrienne Clarkson Presents
- 1995: Gemeaux Award Meilleur pour Meilleur Spécial pour les Arts de la Scène: Peau, Chair et Os
- 2009: Top 25 Canadian Immigrant Award Winner
- November 19, 2010: Vimy Award

Award nominations

- 1992: Gemini Award: Best Host in a Light Information, Variety or Performing Arts Program or Series for Adrienne Clarkson Presents
- 1993: Gemini Award: Best Performing Arts Program for Adrienne Clarkson Presents – shared with Gordon Stewart
- 1994: Gemini Award: Donald Brittain Award for Best Social/Political Documentary Program for Adrienne Clarkson Presents
- 1994: Gemini Award: Best Host in a Lifestyle Information, Variety or Performing Arts Program or Series for Adrienne Clarkson Presents
- 1995: Gemini Award: Best Performing Arts Program for Adrienne Clarkson Presents
- 1998: Gemini Award: Best Performing Arts Program or Series, or Arts Documentary Program for Adrienne Clarkson Presents: Black and White to Colour: The Making of "The English Patient"
- 1998: Gemini Award: Best Performing Arts Program or Series, or Arts Documentary Program for Adrienne Clarkson Presents

Foreign honours

- 1993: Gabriel Award: Adrienne Clarkson Presents: For the Beauty of the Earth
- 1994: New York Television Festival Best International TV Award: Adrienne Clarkson Presents: Skin Flesh and Bone
- 1995: Christopher Columbus International Film and Video Festival The Chris: The Lust of His Eye
- 1997: Christopher Columbus International Film and Video Festival The Chris: Black and White to Colour: The Making of "The English Patient"
- 2001: Grand Cross of the Order of La Pléiade
- June 30, 2006 – March 3, 2022: Member of the Order of Friendship of the Russian Federation
- March 1, 2022: Commander's Cross of the Order of Merit of the Federal Republic of Germany

=== Honorary military appointments ===
- October 8, 2000 – September 27, 2005: Colonel of the Governor General's Horse Guards
- October 8, 2000 – September 27, 2005: Colonel of the Governor General's Foot Guards
- October 8, 2000 – September 27, 2005: Colonel of the Canadian Grenadier Guards
- February 7, 2007 – : Colonel-in-Chief of Princess Patricia's Canadian Light Infantry

=== Honorary degrees ===
- 1996: University of Prince Edward Island, Doctorate.
- April 7, 2000: University of Victoria, Doctor of Laws (LLD)
- 2001: McGill University, Doctor of Laws (LLD)
- May 18, 2001: Royal Military College of Canada, Doctor of Laws (LL.D).
- June 19, 2001: University of Toronto, Doctor of Laws (LL.D)
- February 27, 2003: Law Society of Upper Canada at Osgoode Hall, Doctor of Laws (LLD)
- 2003: University of Ottawa, Doctor of the University (DUniv)
- 2003: Queen's University, Doctor of Laws (LLD)
- June 10, 2004: Concordia University, Doctor of Laws (LLD)
- November 2006: McMaster University, Doctor of Laws (LLD)
- 2006: Ryerson University, Doctor of Laws (LLD)
- May 16, 2008: Mount Saint Vincent University, Doctor of Humane Letters (DHL)
- October 23, 2003: University of Western Ontario, Doctor of Laws (LLD)

=== Fellowships and memberships ===
- 1993: The Royal Conservatory of Music Honorary Fellowship
- Senior Fellow of Massey College
- Honorary Fellow of the Royal Architectural Institute of Canada (FRAIC (hon))
- Honorary Fellow of the Royal College of Physicians and Surgeons of Canada (FRCPSC (hon))
- Honorary Fellow of the Royal Society of Canada (FRSC (hon))
- Honorary Fellow of the University of Trinity College
- Honorary Director of the North American Native Plant Society

=== Honorific eponyms ===
Awards

- Clarkson Cup
- Adrienne Clarkson Laureateship for Public Service, Massey College, Toronto

Schools

- Adrienne Clarkson Elementary School, Ottawa
- Adrienne Clarkson Public School, Richmond Hill, Ontario

=== Arms ===
Coat of arms of Adrienne Clarkson
Notes Just prior to her installation as Governor General, Clarkson was granted a personal coat of arms that depicted her Chinese roots as well as her adopted Canadian life. Adopted October 1, 2000 Crest A loon (Gavia immer) calling proper naiant within a circlet of trillium flowers Argent seeded Or Escutcheon Gules a Chinese phoenix regarding a lightning flash and rising from flames issuant from a maple leaf the whole ensigned by a representation of the Royal Crown all Or Supporters Two tigers Or and Argent embellished Sable each gorged with a ribbon Gules, pendant therefrom a plate surmounted by a cross Gules Compartment Rocks set with four wind-swept jack pines proper Motto Verum Solum Dicatur, Verum Solum Accipiatur (May only the truth be spoken, may only the truth be heard) Orders The ribbon and insignia of a Companion of the Order of Canada. Desiderantes Meliorem Patriam (They desire a better country) Symbolism The phoenix blends the symbolism of Clarkson's Chinese roots with that of the bird rising from the ashes, which stands for the Poy family rebuilding their lives in Canada, as embodied in the maple leaf. Further, the phoenix, whose form was proposed by Dr. Suan-Seh Foo, and is modelled on a fabric decoration from the Qing Dynasty, embodies the female principle, and represents virtues in both Eastern and Western cultures: justice, prudence, fortitude, and temperance in Western mythology, and benevolence, righteousness, reverence, wisdom, and trust in Eastern mythology. The lightning flash stands for Clarkson's career as a television journalist, and the royal crown embodies the governor general's service as the sovereign's representative. The trilliums represent both Clarkson's home province of Ontario, as well as the meaning of her Chinese first name, which is a metaphor for "ice flowering branch", while tigers are Clarkson's favourite animals, and represent the year in which she was born. The cross and white disc are based on the Anglican Church of Canada's badge. The rocks and trees represent the landscape around Clarkson's cottage on Georgian Bay.

== See also ==
- Immigration to Canada
- Refugee § World War II and UNHCR
- List of female viceroys in Canada
- List of governors general of Canada

== Footnotes ==
Government offices
Preceded by Roméo LeBlanc	Governor General of Canada; 2000–2005	Succeeded by Michaëlle Jean
Order of precedence
Preceded by Edward Schreyer as former governor general	Canadian order of precedence	Succeeded by Michaëlle Jean as former governor general
