= William Poy =

Canadian businessman (1907–2002)

- Chinese: 伍英才
Transcriptions
Standard Mandarin
- Hanyu Pinyin: Wǔ Yīngcái
Yue: Cantonese
- Yale Romanization: Ńgh Yīng-Chòih
- Jyutping: ng5 jing1 coi4

William George Poy, MM (Chinese: 伍英才; 17 May 1907 – 3 February 2002) was an Australian-born Canadian civil servant and businessman of Chinese descent. He served with the Royal Hong Kong Regiment (the Volunteers) during World War II as a Lance Corporal messenger and worked for the Canadian Trade Commission in Hong Kong. He was awarded the Military Medal for his service in Hong Kong.

== Life and career ==
Poy was born in Chiltern, Victoria, Australia to Ah Poy as one of seven children. He left Hong Kong in 1942 and settled in Ottawa, Ontario, with his wife Ethel Poy, a fellow migrant from Guangdong province of Hakka descent and their two children, Adrienne and Neville. His daughter, Adrienne, would later become the Governor General of Canada.

Poy obtained a degree in political science from the University of Ottawa. He continued to work at the trade commission until 1946 and later became a stock broker working in Canada and Hong Kong. Poy established the Allied Trading Company in Ottawa after his career with the Trade Commission.

Poy retired in the mid-1970s and moved to Toronto. Widowed in 1988, he died at a nursing home in 2002. He was survived by two brothers, Lindsay and Roy, in Australia, and other distant relatives in China and Australia. He was predeceased by his brother Leslie.
