= Neville Poy =

Canadian philanthropist and plastic surgeon

Neville George Poy, OC, FRCS(C), FACS (Chinese: 伍衛權; Cantonese Ńgh Waih-Kyùhn; born October 29, 1934, in British Hong Kong), is a Canadian philanthropist, photographer and retired plastic surgeon. He is the husband of former Senator Vivienne Poy and the brother of Adrienne Clarkson, who served as Governor General of Canada.

== Life and career ==
Poy came to Canada in 1942 from Hong Kong with father William Poy, mother Ethel Poy and sister Adrienne Clarkson. He graduated from McGill University's medical school in 1960 and went into practice in Toronto shortly after. He retired in 1995 and continues to live in Toronto.

After retirement, Poy has remained active in the community. An award, the "Dr Neville G Poy Award", was created at McGill University in 1994.

In 1998, he was made an Officer of the Order of Canada, the country's second-highest civilian honour, in recognition of being an "internationally renowned plastic surgeon whose extensive research in trauma has greatly improved the quality of medical care received by accident victims".

In 2003, he was appointed Honorary Lieutenant-Colonel of The Queen's York Rangers. He is also a member of the Quadrangle Society of Massey College at the University of Toronto.
