= P. H. Fearon =

British Cartoonist

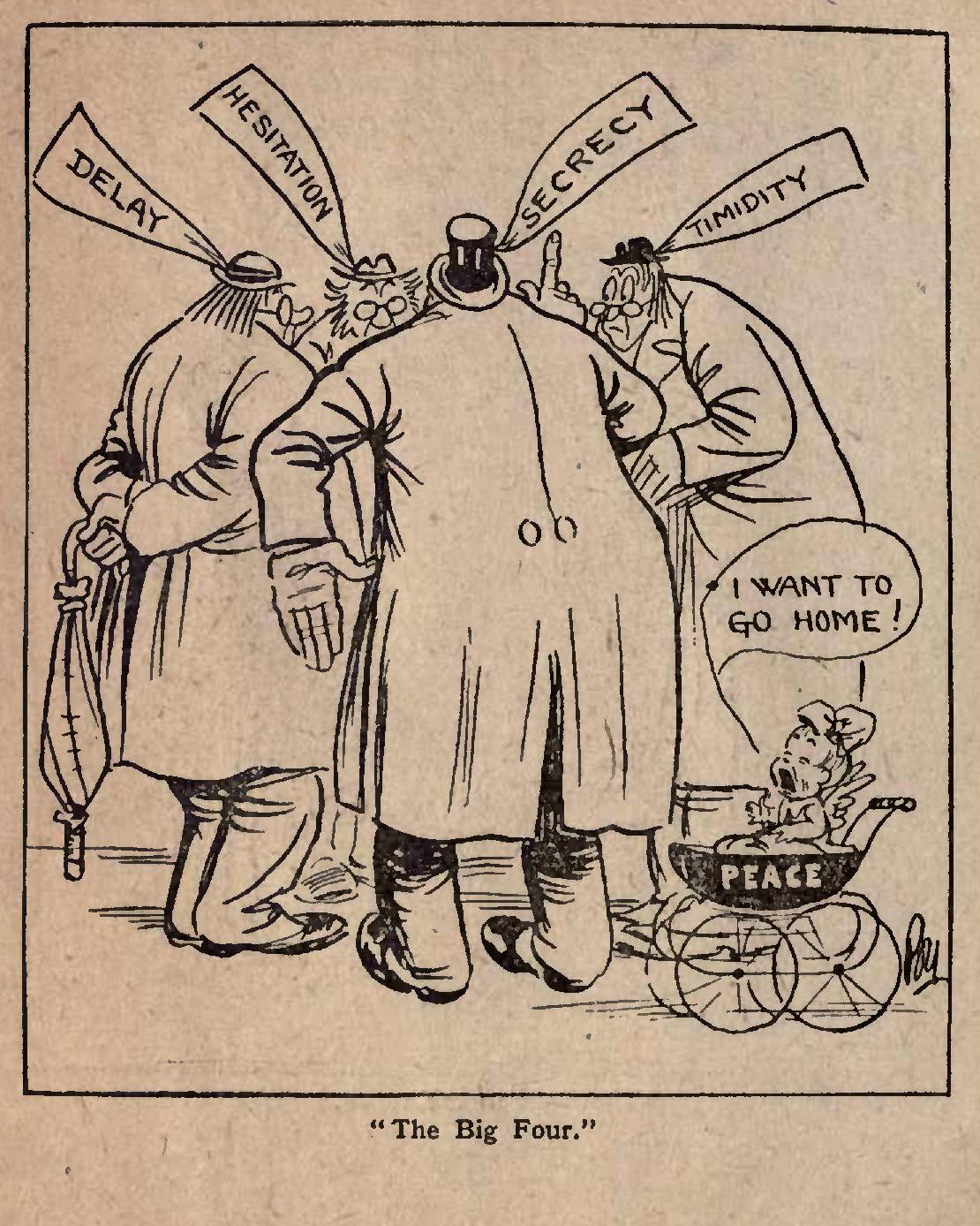
An undated cartoon from the 1920 compilation 100 Poy cartoons: Reprinted from the London "Evening News" and "Daily Mail"

Percy Hutton Fearon (6 September 1874 – 5 November 1948) was a British cartoonist who worked for the Evening News and the Daily Mail, where he drew under the pseudonym "Poy".

He was born in Shanghai to Robert Inglis Fearon. He was educated at an art school in New York and at Hubert von Herkomer's art school. He began his career drawing cartoons for Judy before joining the Manchester Evening Chronicle in 1905. He then drew for the Sunday Chronicle and the Daily Dispatch before joining the Evening News in 1913, where he would remain until 1935. From 1935 until his retirement in 1938 he drew for the Daily Mail.

During his 34-year career he drew 10,000 cartoons and his characters included "John Citizen", "Cuthbert" (a First World War conscientious objector), "Dilly" and "Dally", and "Dora". As a tribute to Winston Churchill for his 80th birthday in 1954, 50 cartoons of Churchill by Fearon were published in a commemorative volume.

== Works ==
- The End of A Tale: A Tribute to ‘Poy’ (1951).
- Poy's Churchill (Argus Press, 1954).
