= Tai Tam Waterworks Heritage Trail =

Heritage trail in Hong Kong

- Traditional Chinese: 大潭水務文物徑
Transcriptions
Yue: Cantonese
- Yale Romanization: Daaih tàahm séui mouh màhn maht ging
- Jyutping: Daai6 taam4 soei2 mou6 man4 mat6 ging3

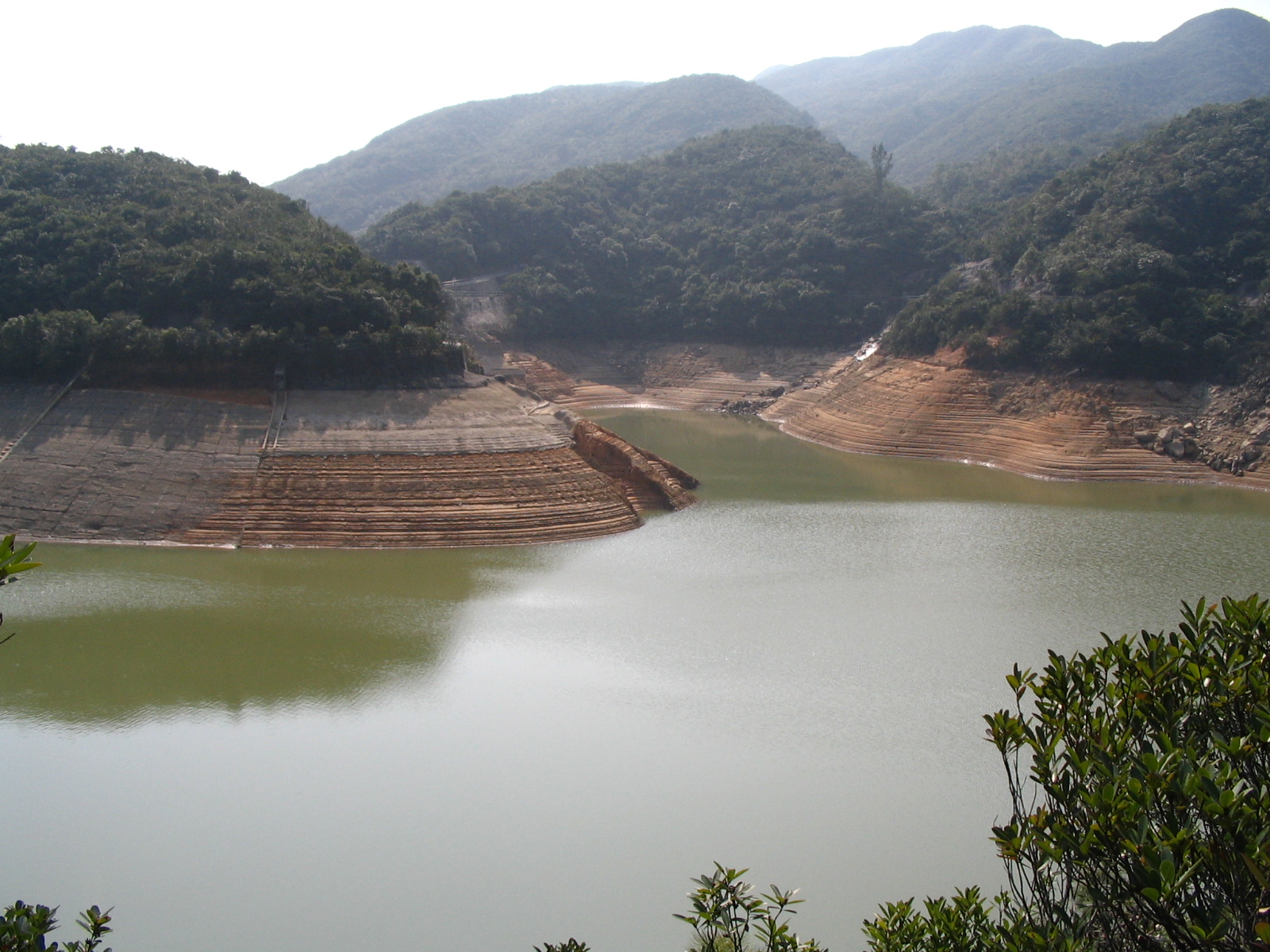
Tai Tam Reservoir

The Tai Tam Waterworks Heritage Trail is a heritage trail in Hong Kong that comprises 22 waterworks structures with historical value near the Tai Tam group of reservoirs. The Trail is about 5 km long and takes about two hours to complete. The Trail is located along the Tai Tam Reservoir Road with entrance at Wong Nai Chung Gap near Hong Kong Parkview or at the junction of Tai Tam Road and Tai Tam Reservoir Road. Ten information stations were established en route to introduce the functions and historic values of the structures. Guided tours will be organised for schools and non-profit making organisations.

Entrance (Tai Tam Road): 22°14′22″N 114°13′23″E
Entrance (Parkview): 22°15′33″N 114°12′01″E

A total of 41 pre-World War II waterworks structures located in six reservoir areas, namely Pok Fu Lam Reservoir, Tai Tam Group of Reservoirs, Wong Nai Chung Reservoir, Kowloon Reservoir, Shing Mun (Jubilee) Reservoir and Aberdeen Reservoir, were declared as monuments in September 2009, to recognise the heritage value of waterworks facilities built in pre-war era. The Trail was established for the declared monuments in the Tai Tam Group of Reservoirs to help the public appreciate the history of water supply and the waterworks structures in Hong Kong. Among the six reservoirs, Wong Nai Chung Reservoir has been converted into a boating park since 1986, while the other reservoirs are still operating.

== History and significance ==
The Tai Tam group of reservoirs includes the Tai Tam Reservoir, Tai Tam Byewash Reservoir, the Tai Tam Intermediate Reservoir and the Tai Tam Tuk Reservoir. They were built under the Tai Tam Valley Scheme and Tai Tam Tuk Scheme serving an aggregate capacity of 9 million cubic metre to meet the ever-increasing demands of water. Upon completion, pressure of water demands from urbanisation spread, from central and western districts to the eastern side of Hong Kong Island, was gradually released.

The Tai Tam Reservoir is the second oldest and largest reservoir built on Hong Kong Island in the Tai Tam Country Park in Hong Kong East by the British colonial government. The project lasted from 1883 till 1888, costing $1,250,000. Its capacity was 250 million imperial gallons (1,100,000 m^{3}) originally and was expanded several times afterwards to 388 million imperial gallons (1,760,000 m^{3}) of water.

The Tai Tam Reservoir was important to the early development of Hong Kong. Its water catered for the needs of water, even present day Central, Wanchai, Causeway Bay, North Point and Shau Kei Wan. Easing the water demands of central, the reservoir moved the city further to the east. Urban area consequently expanded and spread to the eastern side of the island.

Water resources was still tight in Hong Kong in the early 1900s. Thus, the colonial government conducted The Extension of the Tai Tam Water Supply System. The project was divided into two phases. In Phase I, in 1904 – 1908, the Tai Tam Byewash Reservoir and the Tai Tam Intermediate Reservoir were built with capacity of 22.4 million imperial gallons (102,000 m^{3}) and 196 million imperial gallons (890,000 m^{3}) respectively. Phase II started in 1913. The Tai Tam Tuk Reservoir was built from 1914 to 1918 with a capacity of 1.42 billion imperial gallons (6,500,000 m^{3}). The Tai Tam Water Supply System could basically meet the needs of the Hong Kong Island at that time. The Tai Tam Group of Reservoirs is a reminiscence of the water supply history of early Hong Kong.

== Characteristics ==
The reservoir structures are regarded as a kind of Utilitarian engineering structures influenced by Italianate Renaissance of Victorian civil engineering. Therefore, they are considered having heritage value and are kept intact.

With regard to the engineering techniques used, the system used in Tai Tam Reservoir relied much less on gravity flow, which only accounted for about 20% of the total capacity of the ultimate fresh water supply. It was built using a more advanced engineering techniques than those used in building the Pokfulam one, as the system of Pokfulam Reservoir relied completely on a simple principle based on gravity – water running down from a higher place to a lower one.

== Historical structures of the trail ==
The trail is an example of conservation and revitalisation of Hong Kong heritage. There are many waterworks structures with precious historic value in the Tai Tam group of reservoirs along the trail, the following ones have been declared monuments including valve houses, bridges, staff quarters etc. This revitalisation project is different from other past projects in the sense that no extra resources is required to be put onto it.

Photographics for every structures listed below are available on the website of the Conserve and Revitalise Hong Kong Heritage. They are collectively called: "22 Historic Structures of Tai Tam Group of Reservoirs".

| Waterworks Structures | Years of Construction | Description/History | Picture |
|---|---|---|---|
| 1. Tai Tam Upper Reservoir Dam | 1883–1888 | This reservoir dam was the largest dam structure built in Hong Kong in 1888. It was originally 30.5 metres (100 feet) high, 121.9 metres (400 feet) long and 18.3 metres (60 feet) wide at its base, then was raised a further 3.84 metres in 1897. The towering walls of this masonry faced concrete gravity dam contain the reservoir waters to Central. The masonry is roughly dressed with ashlar copings. Waters gravitated through a 2.2 kilometres long tunnel and a 5 kilometres aqueduct to the destination. Along the dam, walkways or berms, which were presumably for regular inspection, are supported by inverted T-shaped stanchions. | |
| 2. Tai Tam Upper Reservoir Valve House | 1883–1888 | Along the top of the reservoir dam, the valve house built of rock-faced rusticated granite blocks is situated at one third of the way. The valve house has been built in a square structure with one door opening and two back window openings, but blocked now. A flat roof with the projecting cornice, supported by carved ornamental corbels with small in-between gaps for ventilation, has replaced the hipped roof. | |
| 3. Tai Tam Upper Reservoir Masonry Aqueduct | 1883–1888 | It has 21 arches and is situated behind a small hill to the southwest of the dam. The aqueduct and the masonry bridge were built very much alike. In other words, the aqueduct is also made of thick concrete slabs supported on strengthened and moulded masonry piers and columns, across what presumably was once a stream bed and diverts rainwater from an indirect drainage catchment to the upper reservoir. It was regarded as a piece of Victorian civil engineering heritage. | |
| 4. Tai Tam Upper Reservoir Masonry Bridge | 1883–1888 | The masonry bridges are constructed with thick concrete slabs supported on piers or columns built of reinforced concrete. Both piers and columns capped with moulded capitals or corbels are used to give extra support for the bridges. The two bridges are built at a right angle to the aqueduct behind a small hill to the southwest of the dam. The masonry bridges span across where was once the byewash of the Tai Tam Upper Reservoir. They are the oldest structures on the Trail with Masonry Aqueduct, Dam, Valve House, and Tunnel Inlet. | |
| 5. Tai Tam Upper Reservoir Recorder House and Tunnel Inlet | 1883–1888 & 1917 | This reservoir tunnel indicates the application of the advanced engineering skills at that time. The tunnel inlet marked by a commemorative stone with the dates 1883-8 is located at the south of the dam. It brings water stored in the Tai Tam Reservoir through the culvert with an iron grating and serves the needs of water supply of residents and businesses in the Central and Western districts of Hong Kong Island through the Bowen Aqueduct pass through Wan Chai. Access catwalks with tubular steel guardrails have been constructed above it. About thirty years later, a recorder house with a flat roof with a plain coping to the parapet, surmounting the tunnel inlet, was built to monitor water flows. Unlike the plain design of its entrance door and window, this recorder house was built with coursed granite walls. | |
| 6. Tai Tam Byewash Reservoir Dam | 1904 | Built in a concrete gravity construction faced with masonry, the reservoir dam is supported and strengthened at either end using wing walls of coursed rubble. There is an overflow or spillway runs almost the entire length of it. | |
| 7. Tai Tam Byewash Reservoir Valve House | 1904 | The small valve house characterised by rock-faced granite walls is in rectangular in shape. It is situated halfway along the subsidiary dam where access walkways aimed early for regular inspections are used by hikers in Tai Tam Country Park nowadays. | |
| 8. 21-Arch Section of the Bowen Aqueduct | 1885–1887 | This is located on the Bowen Fitness Trail, and not on the Tai Tam Waterworks Heritage Trail. Therefore, there are 22 Historic Structures, and the Heritage trail contains 21 of them. | |
| 9. Tai Tam Intermediate Reservoir Dam | 1904–1907 | The concrete side walls and tubular steel guard rails make up a stilling pond with the masonry faced dam at Tai Tam Intermediate Reservoir. For safety reasons, the entire section of the dam's spillway was decreased 3 metres seventy years later after the completion of the original structure. This can be observed from its slightly indented outlook at its crest. | |
| 10. Tai Tam Intermediate Reservoir Valve House | 1904–1907 | Situating on a projecting platform, the valve house can be reached by a footbridge. The door and windows have semi-circular arched feature. An ornamental hopper head can be seen. | |
| 11. Tai Tam Tuk Reservoir Dam | 1912–1917 | The building of this dam began in 1912 while the water supply was proven insufficient again after the Tai Tam Scheme. | |
| 12. Tai Tam Tuk Reservoir Valve House | 1917 | The valve house is situated near the south end of the Tai Tam Tuk Reservoir dam. It is rectangular, with flat roof and granite wall. | |
| 13. Tai Tam Tuk Reservoir Memorial Stone | 1918 | In 1918, a commemorative stone has been built near the southern end at the top of the dam to mark the completion of the scheme. The name of Daniel Joseph Jaffé, after whom Jaffe Road in Wan Chai District was named, appears at the bottom left corner. | |
| 14. Tai Tam Tuk Reservoir Masonry Bridge | 1907 | The bridge has parapets coursed with rusticated or dressed granite copings. At its top, it is lined with decorative cornices. Nowadays, the bridges still ensure the accessibility to the reservoir system. | |
| 15. Tai Tam Tuk Reservoir Masonry Bridge | 1907 | Among the bridges, two are particularly high and have granite imposts inserting between columns and arches. In September 2009, this masonry bridge was declared as a monument by the Secretary for Development Carrie Lam. | |
| 16. Tai Tam Tuk Reservoir Masonry Bridge | 1907 | Each granite arch bridge is structured with huge columns. | |
| 17. Tai Tam Tuk Reservoir Masonry Bridge | 1907 | Along Tai Tam Tuk Reservoir's western shore, four masonry bridges were built. These bridges cross stream beds. | |
| 18. Tai Tam Tuk Raw Water Pumping Station | 1907 | The pumping station's role was to pump water. It was built with red bricks and have Chinese tiled pitched roofs. | |
| 19. Tai Tam Tuk Raw Water Pumping Station Chimney Shaft | 1907 | It is the only surviving waterworks-related chimney stack in Hong Kong. The 61 feet (19 m) square-planned chimney was constructed in red bricks. It was used with coal-burning steam-driven engine. The chimney was abandoned after the World War II. The engine hall is categorised as Georgian Revival. | |
| 20. Tai Tam Tuk Raw Water Pumping Station Staff Quarters | 1905–1907 | It is painted in light yellow. Chinese tiles cover the roof. It is still under operation by the Water Supplies Department. | |
| 21. Tai Tam Tuk Raw Water Pumping Station No.2 Staff Quarters | 1936 | Completed in 1936, it is a small two-storey block waiting to be revitalised. | |
| 22. Tai Tam Tuk Raw Water Pumping Station Senior Staff Quarters | 1905 | Built in 1905, it was originally for the waterworks system manager. Now it is managed by Government Property Agency. | |

== See also ==
- Heritage conservation in Hong Kong
  - Heritage Trails in Hong Kong
  - List of Grade I historic buildings in Hong Kong
  - List of Grade II historic buildings in Hong Kong
  - List of Grade III historic buildings in Hong Kong
- Tai Tam Country Park
- History of Hong Kong
