= Pok Fu Lam Country Park =

Park in Hong Kong

- 薄扶林郊野公園
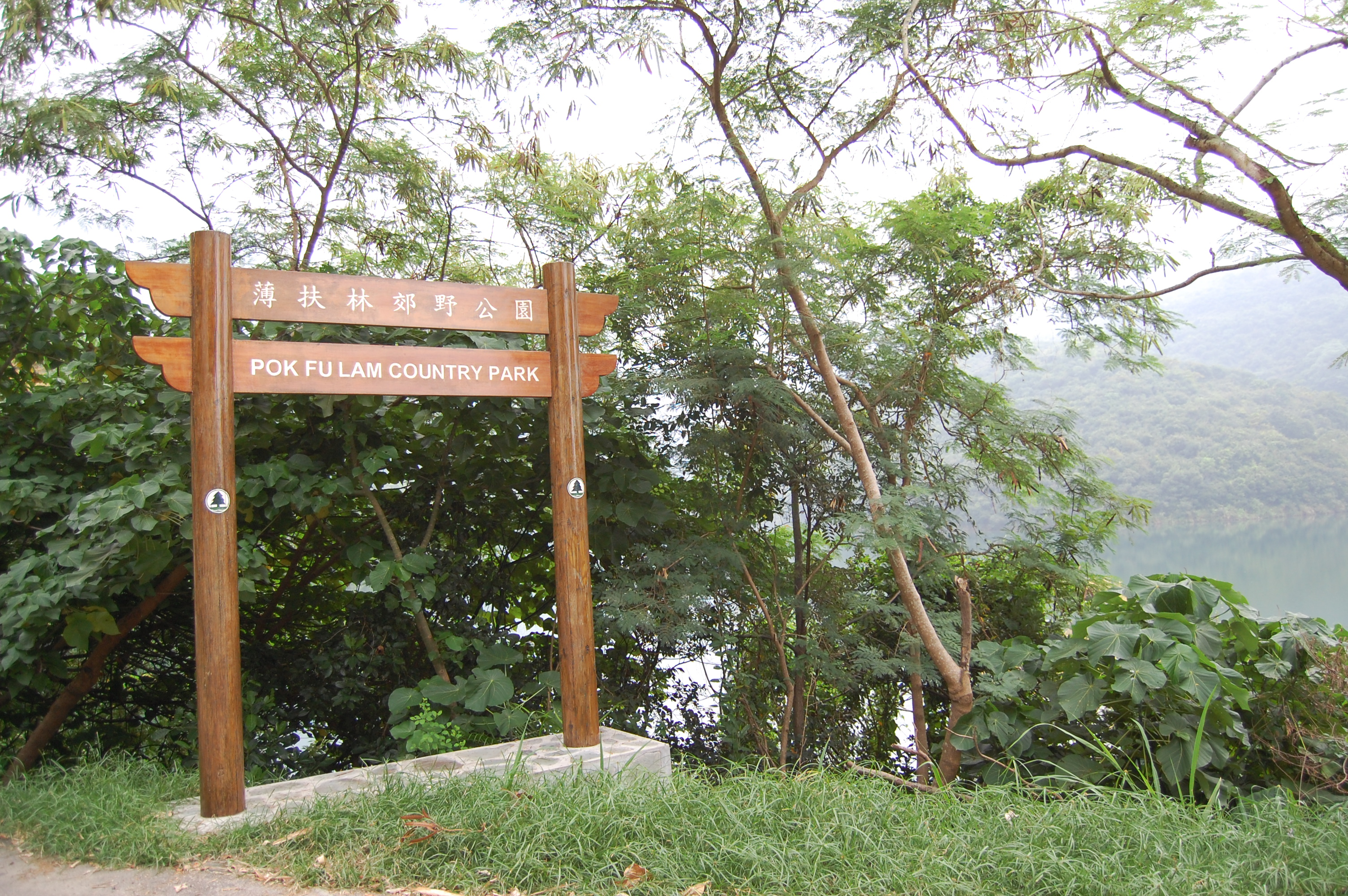
- Pok Fu Lam Country Park
- Interactive map of Pok Fu Lam Country Park
- Location: Southern District, Hong Kong Island
- Coordinates: 22°15′58″N 114°08′14″E
- Area: 270 hectares (2.7 km^{2})
- Established: 1979; 47 years ago
- Website: Official website

Pok Fu Lam Country Park
- Traditional Chinese: 薄扶林郊野公園
Transcriptions
Yue: Cantonese
- Yale Romanization: Bohk fùh làhm gāau yéh gūng yùhn
- Jyutping: Bok6 fu4 lam4 gaau1 je5 gung1 jyun4

Pok Fu Lam Country Park is located on Pok Fu Lam, the western end of the Southern District of Hong Kong Island. The 270-hectare park was designated in 1979.

== Ecology ==
The park is located at the foot of Victoria Peak. Since being declared a park, the Agriculture, Fisheries and Conservation Department has engaged in efforts to green the valley. Many non-native species have been planted over the years such as slash pine, Formosa acacia and Brisbane box, as well as native trees including Hong Kong Gordonia and Chekiang machilus.

== Features ==
The park includes:

- Hong Kong Trail
- Harlech Road
- Lugard Road
- Peak Trail
- Pok Fu Lam Reservoir (1863)
- Sylvan sanctuary

== See also ==
- Aberdeen Country Park
- Tai Tam Country Park
