= Tai Tam Byewash Reservoir =

Reservoir in Hong Kong Island, Hong Kong

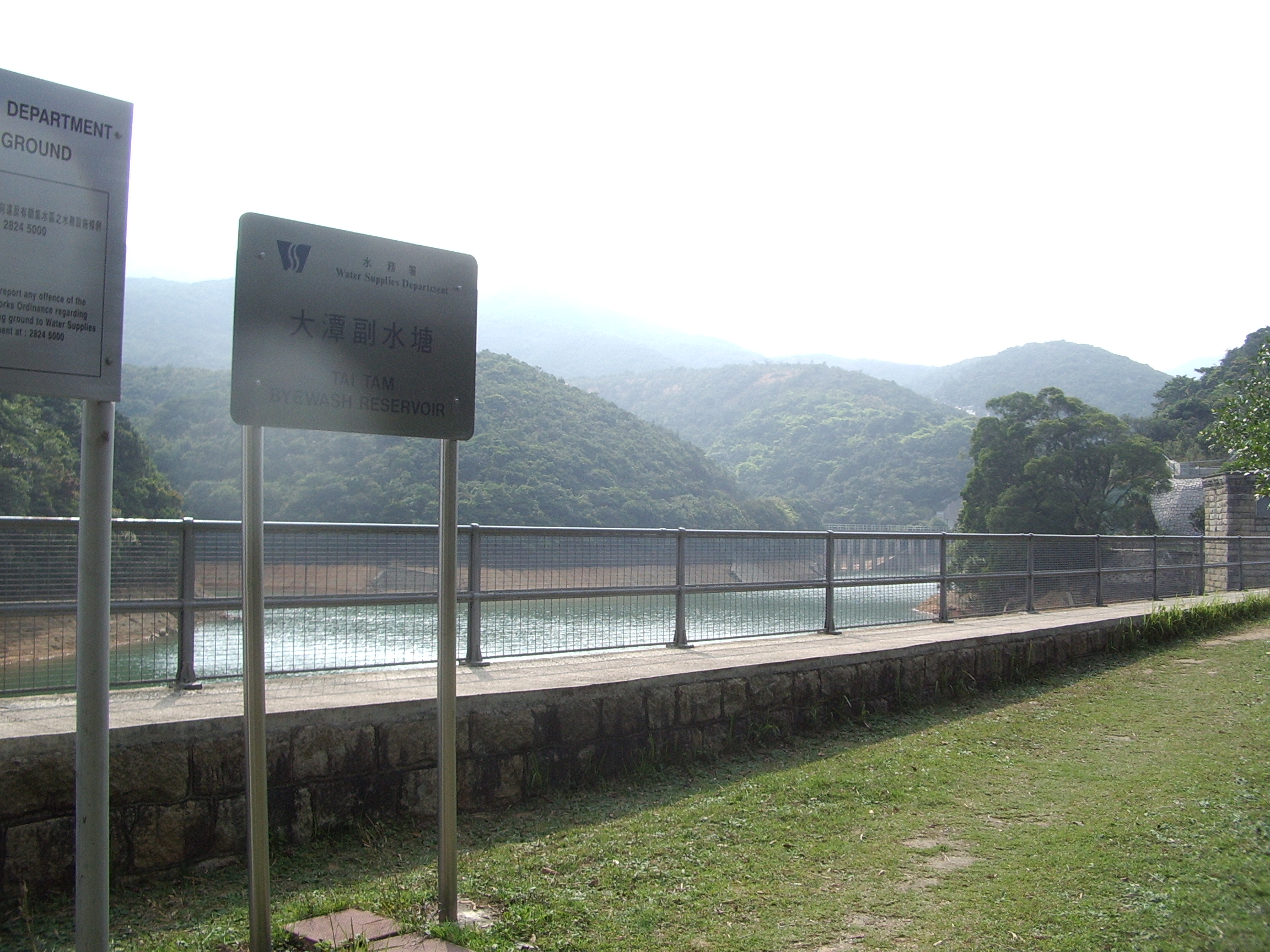
- Tai Tam Byewash Reservoir

- Location within Hong Kong
- Location: Tai Tam, Hong Kong Island, Hong Kong
- Coordinates: 22.256018°N 114.211836°E
- Lake type: reservoir
- Built: 1904; 122 years ago
- Water volume: 80,000 cubic metres (2,800,000 cu ft)

Tai Tam Byewash Reservoir
- Traditional Chinese: 大潭副水塘
Transcriptions
Standard Mandarin
- Hanyu Pinyin: Dà tán fù shuǐ táng
Yue: Cantonese
- Yale Romanization: Daaih tàahm fu séui tòhng
- Jyutping: Daai6 taam4 fu3 seoi2 tong4

Tai Tam Byewash Reservoir, part of the Tai Tam Reservoirs, is a reservoir in Tai Tam Country Park, Tai Tam, Hong Kong Island, Hong Kong, and has a water storage capacity of 22.4 million gallons. The reservoir was completed in 1904.

Tai Tam Byewash Reservoir and Tai Tam Upper Reservoir are separated by a vehicular bridge. When full, the water from Tai Tam Upper Reservoir will pass through the bottom part of the bridge to Tai Tam Byewash Reservoir giving the appearance that the two reservoirs are jointly known as Tai Tam Reservoir (大潭水塘).

The reservoir can be accessed by Stage 6 of the Hong Kong Trail or by the Tai Tam Waterworks Heritage Trail.

Its dam and the valve house built at the centre of the dam are listed as declared monuments while the ruins of the Tai Tam Byewash Reservoir senior staff bungalow and the workmen's quarters as well as the Tai Tam Reservoir Red Brick Building are classified as Grade III historic buildings.

== History ==
The water storage capacity of Tai Tam Upper Reservoir is still inferior to the population growth. As Hong Kong Island lacks land that can be developed into a catchment area, the government decided to expand the water supply system of Tai Tam Valley, implement the second phase of The Extension of the Tai Tam Water Supply System and to construct the byewash Reservoir to collect the freshwater overflowing from the upper reservoir. The project was designed by James Orange, the resident engineer of the Tai Tam Reservoir construction project. The byewash reservoir consists of two dams, the main dam and the secondary dam. The main dam is a concrete gravity dam while the secondary dam is not far to the left of the main dam. There is a short pier between these two dams and the reservoir was completed in 1904.

== See also ==
- List of reservoirs of Hong Kong
- Tai Tam Reservoirs
- Tai Tam Intermediate Reservoir
- Tai Tam Waterworks Heritage Trail
