= Aberdeen Reservoirs =

Reservoirs in Hong Kong

Coordinates: 22°15′24.81″N 114°9′47.62″E

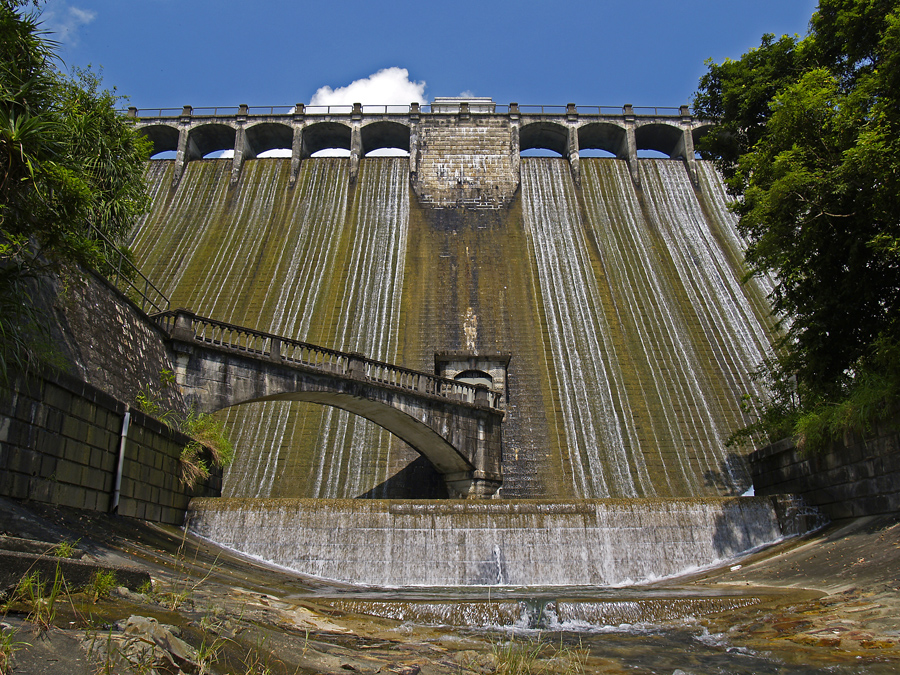
- Dam of Upper Aberdeen Reservoir
- Chinese: 香港仔水塘
Transcriptions
Standard Mandarin
- Hanyu Pinyin: Xiānggǎng zǎi shuǐtáng
- Wade–Giles: Hsiangkang tsai shuit'ang
- Yale Romanization: Syānggǎng dzǎi shwěitáng
- IPA: [ɕjáŋkàŋ tsàɪ ʂwèɪtʰâŋ]
Yue: Cantonese
- Yale Romanization: Heūng góng jái seuítòhng
- Jyutping: Hoeng1 gong2 zai2 seoi2tong4
- IPA: [hœ́ːŋkɔ̌ːŋ tsɐ̌i sɵ̌ytʰɔ̏ːŋ]

Upper Aberdeen Reservoir
- Chinese: 香港仔上水塘
Transcriptions
Standard Mandarin
- Hanyu Pinyin: Xiānggǎng zǎi shàng shuǐtáng
- Wade–Giles: Hsiangkang tsai shang shuit'ang
- Yale Romanization: Syānggǎng dzǎi shàng shwěitáng
Yue: Cantonese
- Yale Romanization: Heūng góng jái seúhng seuítòhng
- Jyutping: Hoeng1 gong2 zai2 seong5 seoi2tong4
- IPA: [hœ́ːŋkɔ̌ːŋ tsɐ̌i sɵ̬ŋ sɵ̌ytʰɔ̏ːŋ]

Second alternative Chinese name
- Chinese: 香港仔下水塘
Transcriptions
Standard Mandarin
- Hanyu Pinyin: Xiānggǎng zǎi xià shuǐtáng
- Wade–Giles: Hsiangkang tsai hsia shuit'ang
- Yale Romanization: Syānggǎng dzǎi syà shwěitáng
Yue: Cantonese
- Yale Romanization: Heūng góng jái háh seuítòhng
- Jyutping: Hoeng1 gong2 zai2 haa5 seoi2 tong4
- IPA: [hœ́ːŋkɔ̌ːŋ tsɐ̌i ha̬ː sɵ̌ytʰɔ̏ːŋ]

The Aberdeen Reservoirs are a group of two reservoirs, consisting of the Upper Aberdeen Reservoir (香港仔上水塘) and the Lower Aberdeen Reservoir (香港仔下水塘), in Aberdeen, Hong Kong.

== History ==
The Aberdeen Reservoirs were built to augment Pok Fu Lam Reservoir in providing water supply to the west of Hong Kong Island. The Lower Aberdeen Reservoir, with a capacity of 44.2 million imperial gallons (201,000 m^{3}), was originally a private reservoir owned by Tai Shing Paper Factory, built in 1890, which also provided water to nearby residents. The Government bought the reservoir at a price of HK$460,000 and expanded it to a capacity of 486,000 cu m. At the same time, the Government built a new reservoir with a capacity of 773,000 cu m above the original one, increasing the total capacity to 1,259,000 cu m. The reservoirs were officially opened on 15 December 1931 by Governor of Hong Kong William Peel, becoming the fourth and last reservoir group ever built on Hong Kong Island, after Pok Fu Lam, Tai Tam and Wong Nai Chung.

In 1977, a 4.23 square kilometre area around the reservoir was designated as Aberdeen Country Park, one of the earliest country parks in Hong Kong.

A total of 41 pre-World War II waterworks structures located in six reservoir areas, namely Pok Fu Lam Reservoir, Tai Tam Group of Reservoirs, Wong Nai Chung Reservoir, Kowloon Reservoir, Shing Mun (Jubilee) Reservoir and Aberdeen Reservoir, were declared as monuments in September 2009; the dam, a valve house and a bridge of the Aberdeen Upper Reservoir and a dam of the Aberdeen Lower Reservoir were declared as monuments in 2009.
