= Daniel Joseph Jaffé =

British civil engineer (1876–1921)

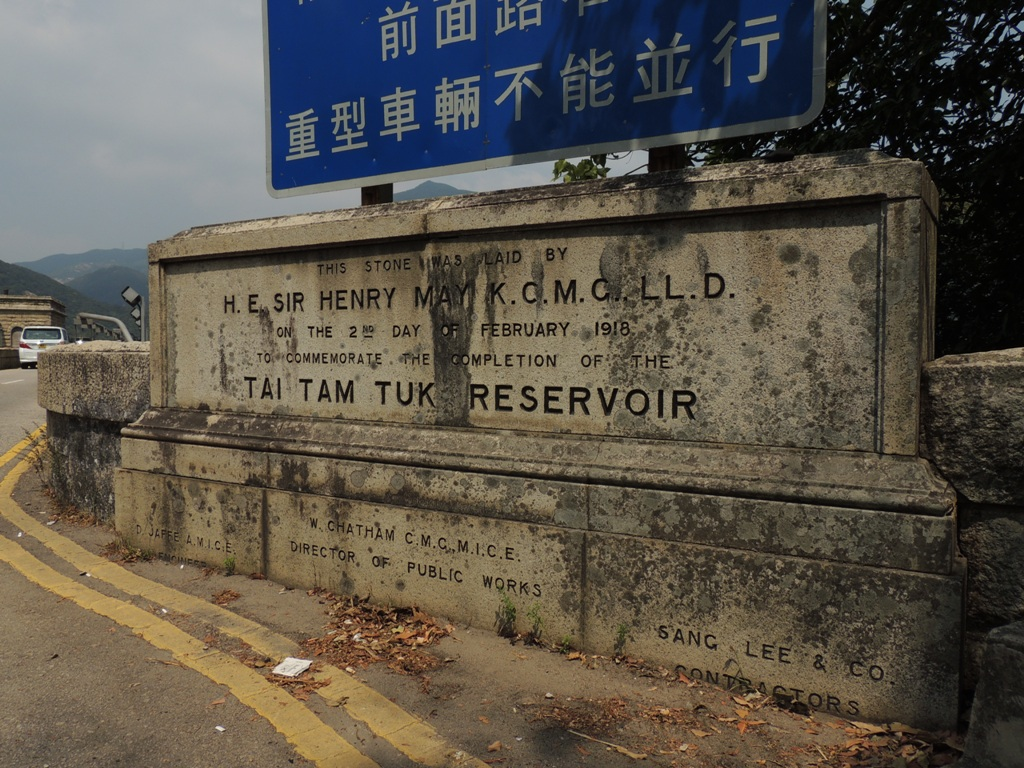
Memorial Stone of Tai Tam Tuk Reservoir. The name of Daniel Jaffé appears at the bottom left corner.

Daniel Joseph Jaffé (2 November 1876 – 11 June 1921) was a British civil engineer. He was the younger son of Martin Jaffé and nephew of Sir Otto Jaffé. Jaffe Road, a street in Wan Chai and Causeway Bay, Hong Kong was named after him.

== Early life and education ==
Daniel Jaffé was born in London to the Jaffe family and educated at City & Guilds Westminster, earning a diploma of associate (A.C.G.I.). In 1896, he was articled for three years as civil engineer to Sir James Mansergh, who was famous as a waterworks consulting engineer.

== Career ==
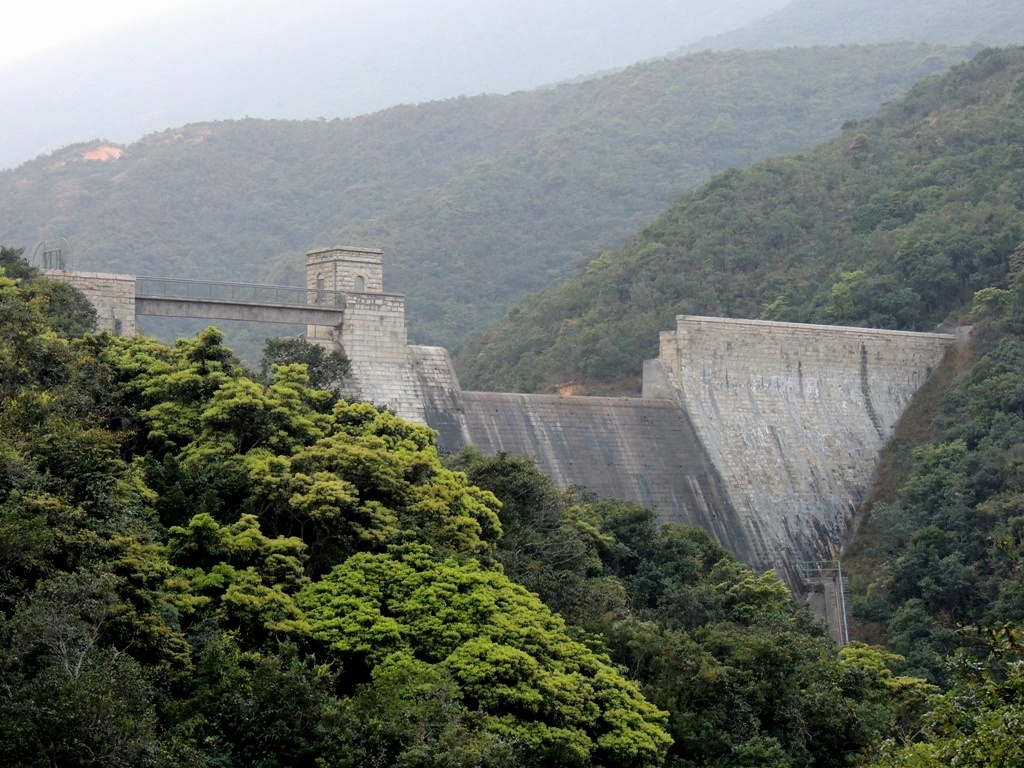
Tai Tam Intermediate Reservoir Dam

He spent time on the Elan Valley Aqueduct and was later assistant to one of the resident engineers up to December 1901. On 14 January 1902 he became associate member of the Institution of Civil Engineers (A.M.I.C.E.). Later that year, he went to Hong Kong as Assistant Engineer in the Public Works Department. In 1904 he became Acting Executive Engineer and from January 1906 was Executive Engineer.

He was responsible for the Tytam (also spelt Tai Tam) waterworks with intermediate dam, later the 2nd section of the Tytam Tuk with the construction of the then-largest dam in the Far East, which was officially opened by Sir Henry May, then governor of the territory, in February 1918. He was also responsible for the typhoon shelter at Mong Kok Tsui.

He went home on leave in 1918, suffering from sprue and inflammation of the liver, and was invalided out of the Colonial Service in autumn 1919. He spent considerable time in Eversleigh Hospital for Tropical Diseases suffering from pernicious anaemia. Jaffe died in Croydon in 1921.
