= Tai Tam Intermediate Reservoir =

Reservoir in Hong Kong Island, Hong Kong

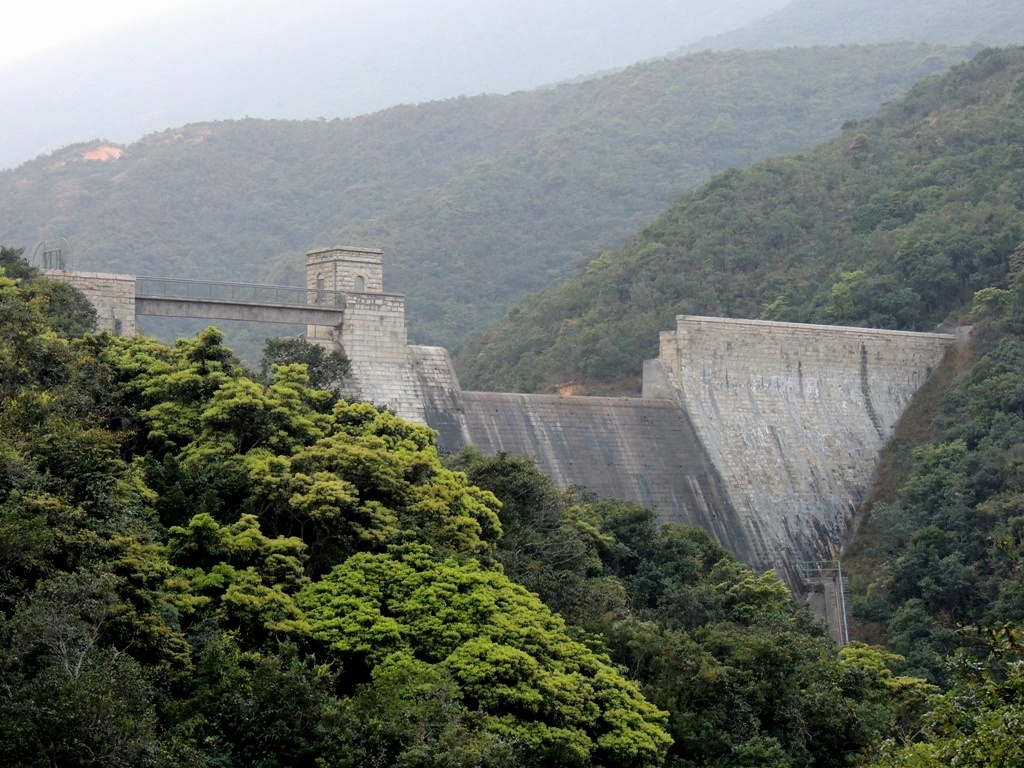
- Dam of Tai Tam Intermediate Reservoir

- Location within Hong Kong
- Location: Tai Tam, Hong Kong Island, Hong Kong
- Coordinates: 22.2466°N 114.21045°E
- Lake type: reservoir
- Built: 1907; 119 years ago
- Water volume: 686,000 cubic metres (24,200,000 cu ft)

Tai Tam Intermediate Reservoir
- Traditional Chinese: 大潭中水塘
Transcriptions
Standard Mandarin
- Hanyu Pinyin: Dà tán zhōng shuǐ táng
Yue: Cantonese
- Yale Romanization: Daaih tàahm jūng séui tòhng
- Jyutping: Daai6 taam4 zung1 seoi2 tong4

Tai Tam Intermediate Reservoir, part of the Tai Tam Reservoirs, is a reservoir in Tai Tam Country Park, Tai Tam, Hong Kong Island, Hong Kong and has a water storage capacity of 19.6 million gallons. The reservoir was completed in 1907.

The reservoir can be accessed by the Tai Tam Waterworks Heritage Trail.

The reservoir is still in operation and the dam was constructed in slope style. Its dam and the valve house built at the centre of the dam are listed as declared monuments in September 2009.

== History ==
The Director of Public Works William Chatham had submitted to the Legislative Council a draft plan for The Extension of the Tai Tam Water Supply System, called the "Tai Tam Tuk Scheme", which will be carried out in two phases on 17 October 1903. The first phase of the construction of 195.5 million gallons (900,000 m^{3}) water storage in Tai Tam Intermediate Reservoir, which was carried out from 1904 to 1907. Therefore, Tai Tam Intermediate Reservoir is geographically lower than the tunnel inlet of Tai Tam Upper Reservoir. Therefore, it is necessary to build a Tai Tam Tuk raw water pumping station on the west bank of Tai Tam Bay to pump the stored water to Tai Tam Valley and deploy it to the water supply system of the Central District through the entrance of the water conveyance tunnel. In 1977, the Water Supplies Department lowered the entire section of the dam's spillway by three metres for safety reasons, and this had left the dam looking slightly indented at its crest.

== See also ==
- List of reservoirs of Hong Kong
- Tai Tam Reservoirs
- Tai Tam Byewash Reservoir
- Tai Tam Waterworks Heritage Trail
