= Tai Tam Reservoirs =

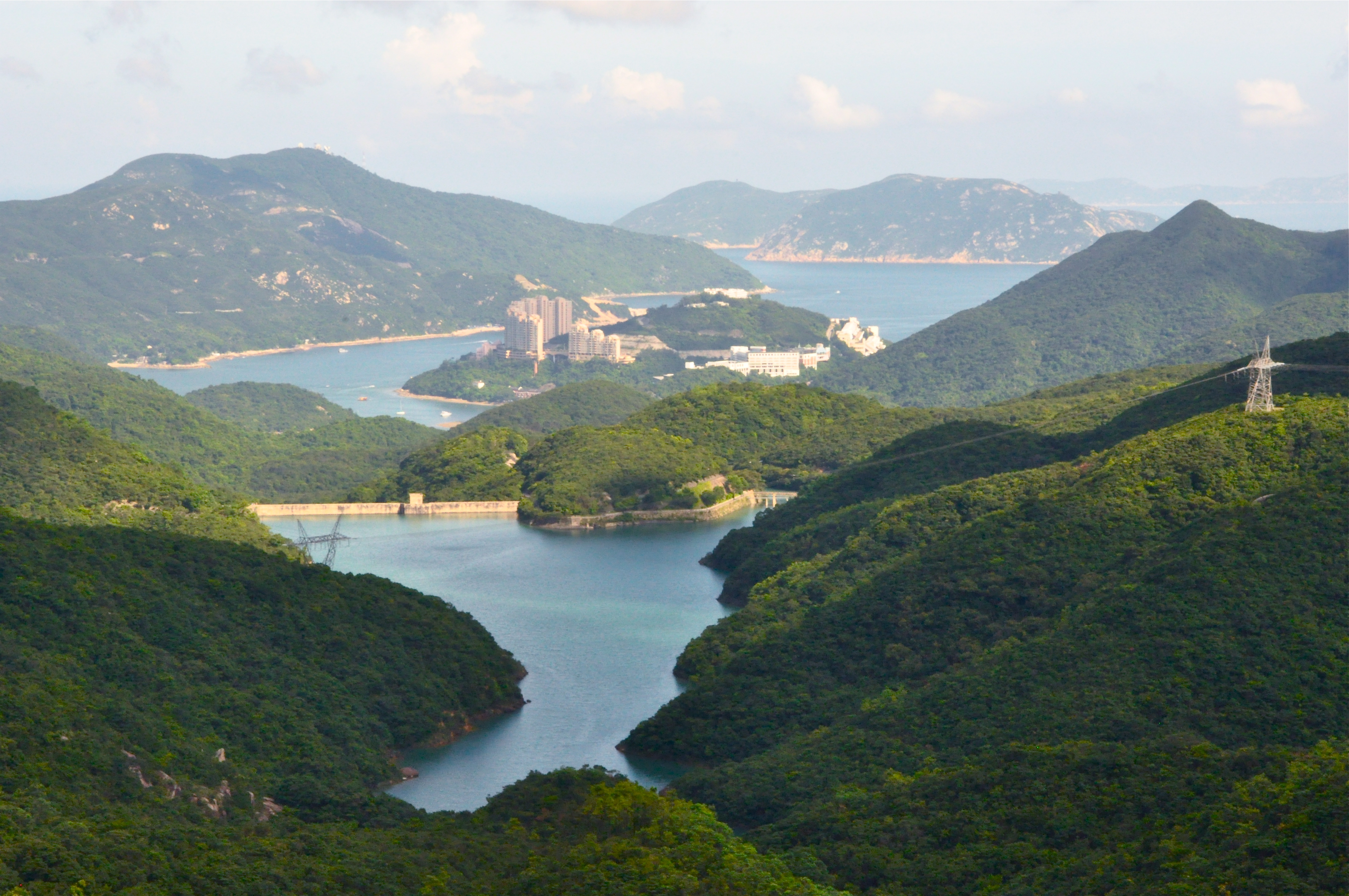
- Tai Tam Upper Reservoir in July 2010

- Location within Hong Kong
- Location: Hong Kong
- Coordinates: 22.26°N 114.21°E
- Lake type: reservoir

Tai Tam Reservoirs
- Traditional Chinese: 大潭水塘
Transcriptions
Standard Mandarin
- Hanyu Pinyin: Dàtán Shuǐtáng
Yue: Cantonese
- Yale Romanization: Daaih tàahm séui tòhng
- Jyutping: Daai6 taam4 seoi2 tong4

The Tai Tam Reservoirs, also known as Tai Tam Reservoir Group, is a group of reservoirs located in the Tai Tam Country Park in the eastern part of Hong Kong Island in Hong Kong. The four reservoirs have a total storage capacity of 6.2 million cubic metres. They are managed by the Water Supplies Department of the Hong Kong Government.

The reservoirs consist of:

- Tai Tam Upper Reservoir (大潭上水塘), 22.260°N 114.210°E
- Tai Tam Byewash Reservoir (大潭副水塘),
- Tai Tam Intermediate Reservoir (大潭中水塘) 22.246°N 114.210°E and
- Tai Tam Tuk Reservoir (大潭篤水塘) 22.243°N 114.220°E.

The upper and byewash reservoirs are jointly known as Tai Tam Reservoir (大潭水塘).

== Geography ==
The reservoirs are surrounded by Mount Butler (畢拿山), Jardine's Lookout, Violet Hill and Mount Parker, with an extraordinary environment of peace and quiet.

== History ==
The planning of the reservoirs is known as the Tai Tam scheme, which was started early in 1872 and was shelved in 1874 because of economic depression. The scheme was continued later in 1882 and virtually completed in 1888. Yet again, the supply was proved insufficient and the building of the Tai Tam Tuk dam began in 1912.

=== Tai Tam Tuk Reservoir ===
As part of the Tai Tam scheme, the UK colonial government commenced the construction of Tai Tam Tuk Reservoir in 1912. The project was completed in 1917, cost 2.46 million Hong Kong dollars and had a 1.42-billion-gallon capacity upon completion. The dam, designed by Daniel Jaffe, was 60-feet tall and 800-feet wide. Twelve arches supported by half-round granite columns were also built to prop up the Tai Tam Road connecting Stanley and Chai Wan. Governor Henry May officially announced the completion of the reservoir on 2 February 1918, and the reservoir continues to operate today.

== Conservation ==
=== Heritage Trail ===
In September 2009, the Tai Tam Waterworks Heritage Trail was opened, covering the architectural landmarks of the reservoir system. Placards describe the features, giving insights into the work involved in the construction of what the source of most of Hong Kong Island's fresh water supply.

=== Declared Monuments ===
Twenty-two facilities surrounding Tai Tam Tuk reservoir were declared as monuments in 2009, including pumping stations, masonry bridges, the memorial stone, the value house and the dam itself.

A list of the facilities declared Monument:

Name of Structure	Photo	Year Built	Location	Note	Reference
Tai Tam Upper Reservoir Masonry Bridge		1888	Tai Tam Upper Reservoir	Declared Monument in 2009	
Tai Tam Upper Reservoir Masonry Aqueduct		1888	Tai Tam Upper Reservoir	Declared Monument in 2009	
Tai Tam Upper Reservoir Dam		1888	Tai Tam Upper Reservoir	Declared Monument in 2009	
Tai Tam Upper Reservoir Valve House		1904	Tai Tam Upper Reservoir	Declared Monument in 2009	
Tai Tam Upper Reservoir Tunnel Inlet and Recorder House		1888 & 1917	Tai Tam Upper Reservoir	Declared Monument in 2009	
Tai Tam Byewash Reservoir Valve House		1904	Tai Tam Byewash Reservoir	Declared Monument in 2009	
Tai Tam Byewash Reservoir Dam		1904 - 1907	Tai Tam Byewash Reservoir	Declared Monument in 2009	
Tai Tam Intermediate Reservoir Dam		1904 - 1907	Tai Tam Intermediate Reservoir	Declared Monument in 2009	
Tai Tam Intermediate Reservoir Valve House		1904 - 1907	Tai Tam Intermediate Reservoir	Declared Monument in 2009	
Tai Tam Tuk Reservoir's Four Masonry Bridges		1907	Tai Tam Tuk Reservoir	Declared Monument in 2009	
Tai Tam Tuk Reservoir Dam		1912 - 1917	Tai Tam Tuk Reservoir	Declared Monument in 2009	
Tai Tam Tuk Reservoir Valve House		1917	Tai Tam Tuk Reservoir	Declared Monument in 2009	
Tai Tam Tuk Reservoir Memorial Stone		1918	Tai Tam Tuk Reservoir	Declared Monument in 2009	
Tai Tam Tuk Raw Water Pumping Station Staff Quarters		1907	Tai Tam Tuk Raw Water Pumping Station	Declared Monument in 2009	
Tai Tam Tuk Raw Water Pumping Station No. 2 Staff Quarters		1936	Tai Tam Tuk Raw Water Pumping Station	Declared Monument in 2009	
Tai Tam Tuk Raw Water Pumping Station		1907	Tai Tam Tuk Raw Water Pumping Station	Declared Monument in 2009	
Tai Tam Tuk Raw Water Pumping Station Chimney Shaft and its Flue		1907	Tai Tam Tuk Raw Water Pumping Station	Declared Monument in 2009	
Tai Tam Tuk Raw Water Pumping Station Senior Staff Quarters		1907	Tai Tam Tuk Raw Water Pumping Station	Declared Monument in 2009	

== Transportation ==
A restricted road, Tai Tam Reservoir Road, links reservoirs from Wong Nai Chung Gap to Tai Tam.
