= Tai Tam =

Area of Hong Kong

Coordinates: 22°14′16″N 114°13′25″E

- Chinese: 大潭
- Cantonese Yale: Daaih tàahm
Transcriptions
Standard Mandarin
- Hanyu Pinyin: Dàtán
- Gwoyeu Romatzyh: Dahtarn
- Wade–Giles: Ta^{4}-tʻan^{2}
- IPA: [tâ.tʰǎn]
Yue: Cantonese
- Yale Romanization: Daaih tàahm
- Jyutping: Daai6 taam4
- IPA: [tàːi.tʰȁːm]

Tai Tam Tuk
- Chinese: 大潭篤
- Cantonese Yale: Daaih tàahm dūk
Transcriptions
Standard Mandarin
- Hanyu Pinyin: Dàtándǔ
- Gwoyeu Romatzyh: Dahtarnduu
- Wade–Giles: Ta^{4}-tʻan^{2}-tu^{3}
- IPA: [tâ.tʰǎn.tù]
Yue: Cantonese
- Yale Romanization: Daaih tàahm dūk
- Jyutping: Daai6 taam4 duk1
- IPA: [tàːi.tʰȁːm.tók̚]

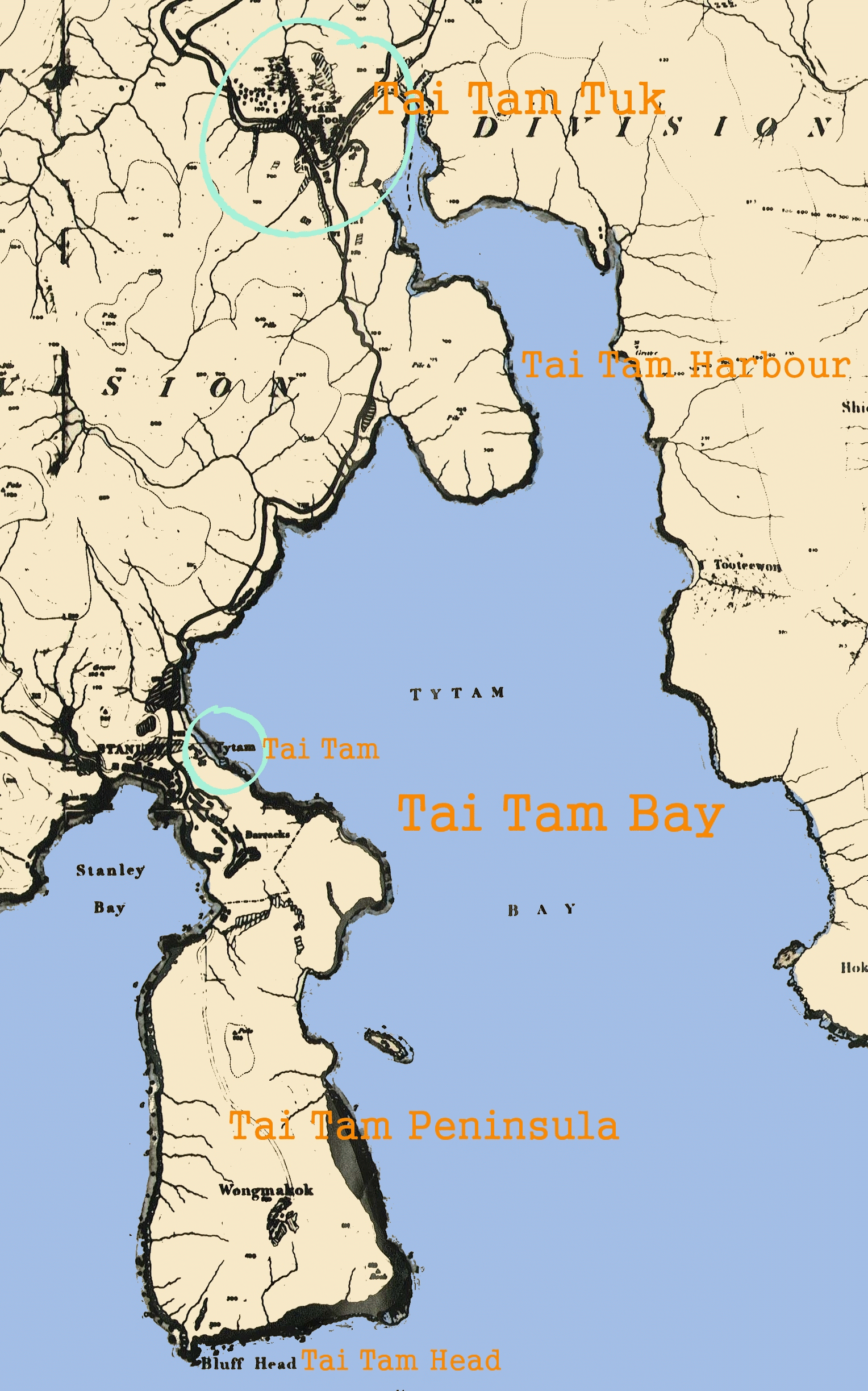
Map of Tai Tam (1845)

Tai Tam or Tytam is an area in Southern District on Hong Kong Island, Hong Kong. Tai Tam means a big pool in the Chinese language which illustrates a triangular bay, namely Tai Tam Bay between Stanley Peninsula, D'Aguilar Peak and Tai Tam Tuk ([tàːi tʰȁːm tók̚], lit. innermost of Tai Tam, also known as Tytam Took). The meaning of Tai Tam varies greatly between the early colonial days and the present day.

== Current usage ==
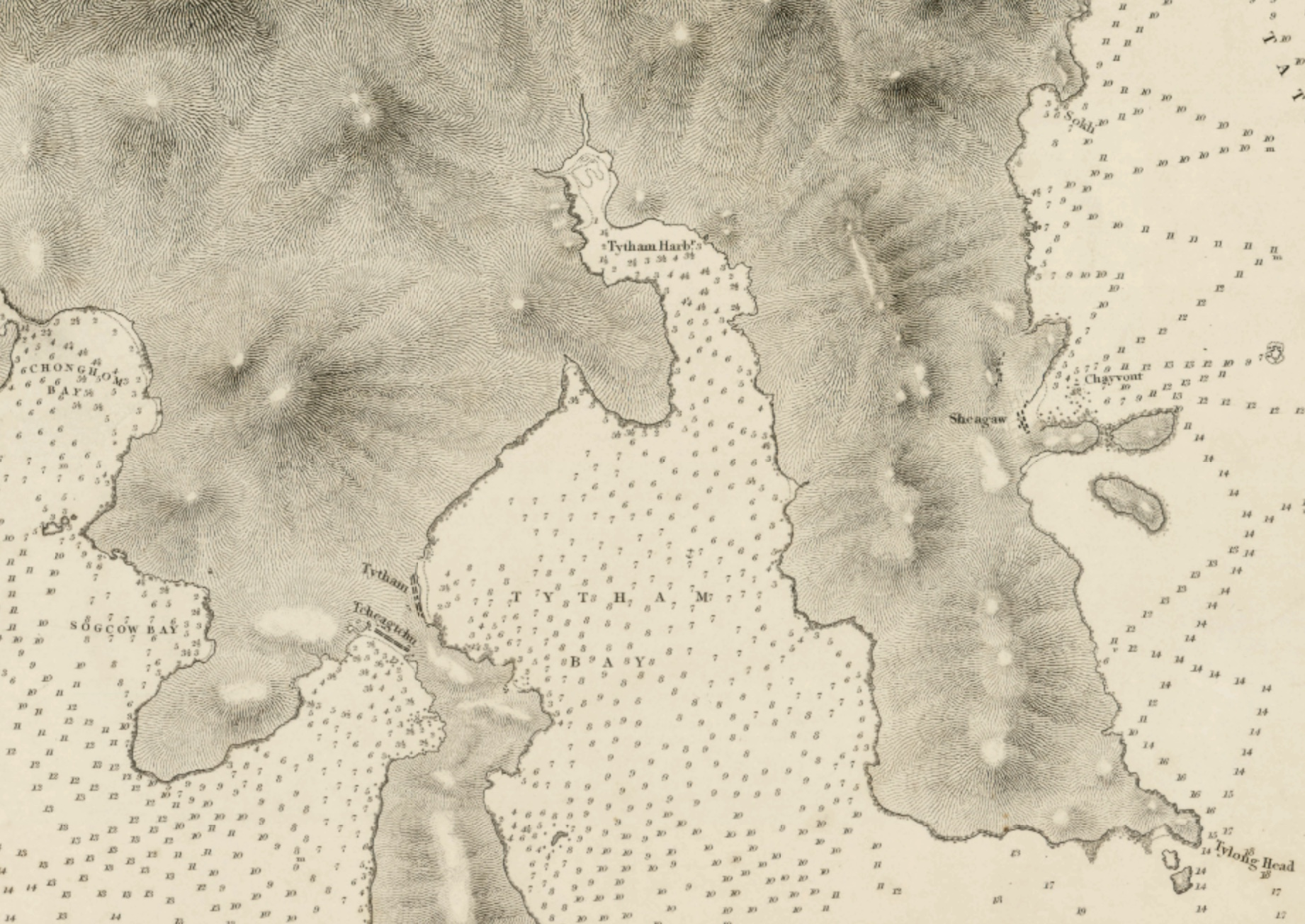
Tai Tam Bay in January 1843 as surveyed by HMS Sulphur.

Tai Tam Bay has been documented as early as January 1843, after the Convention of Chuenpi, by HMS Sulphur commanded by Sir Belcher and Sir Kellett. The area was romanized as Tytham (see image).

The present-day Tai Tam is the area around Tai Tam Tuk, the location of Tai Tam Tuk Reservoir. It is covered by the Tai Tam Reservoirs, the Tai Tam Country Park and Tai Tam Country Park (Quarry Bay extension). Along Tai Tam Road are some luxurious apartment towers and houses, such as the Manhattan.

The innermost of Tai Tam Bay is Tai Tam Harbour, close to Tai Tam Tuk. The Red Hill in the southern part of Tai Tam Tuk is an area primarily consisting of low-rise upmarket residences, including the Redhill Peninsula, Red Hill Park, Turtle Cove, Le Palais and Villa Rosa.

Tai Tam Scout Centre is a Scout campsite of The Scout Association of Hong Kong on the shore of Tai Tam Harbour. From the campsite to the foot of the dam of Tai Tam Tuk Reservoir is the Tai Tam Tuk Village. The shore outside the village is mudland with some mangrove plants.

The high school and middle school campuses of the Hong Kong International School are also in Tai Tam.

The Tai Tam Tuk Eco Educational Centre is a visitors centre run by the Tai Tam Tuk Foundation with the aim to educate and inspire action for sustainable development in Hong Kong through hands on interaction with the outstanding nature and culture of Tai Tam. Organising a number of Citizen Science events to engage and involve the public, the site was one of the first BioBlitz events organised in Hong Kong.

== Historical usage ==
In 1845, Tai Tam was a small habitat east of the market of Stanley, facing Tai Tam Bay. (It still uses the postal address of Tai Tam Village, Stanley). Later, the Stanley Peninsula was also known as Tai Tam Peninsula. The southeast cape of the peninsula is Tai Tam Head. Tai Tam Tuk, the site of Tai Tam Tuk Reservoir, was a valley habitat with extensive cultivation. The village of Tai Tam Tuk was moved to Tai Tam Harbour due to the construction of the reservoir. The Tai Tam area was the scene of heavy fighting between Commonwealth and Japanese forces in December 1941.

== Places in Tai Tam ==
- American Club Hong Kong has its main, larger location in Tai Tam
- Hong Kong International School
- Hong Kong Parkview
- Red Hill Plaza
- Tai Tam Scout Centre
- Pacific View
- Tai Tam Waterworks Heritage Trail
- The Manhattan, 33 Tai Tam Road
