= Hong Kong Island =

Second largest island in Hong Kong

香港島
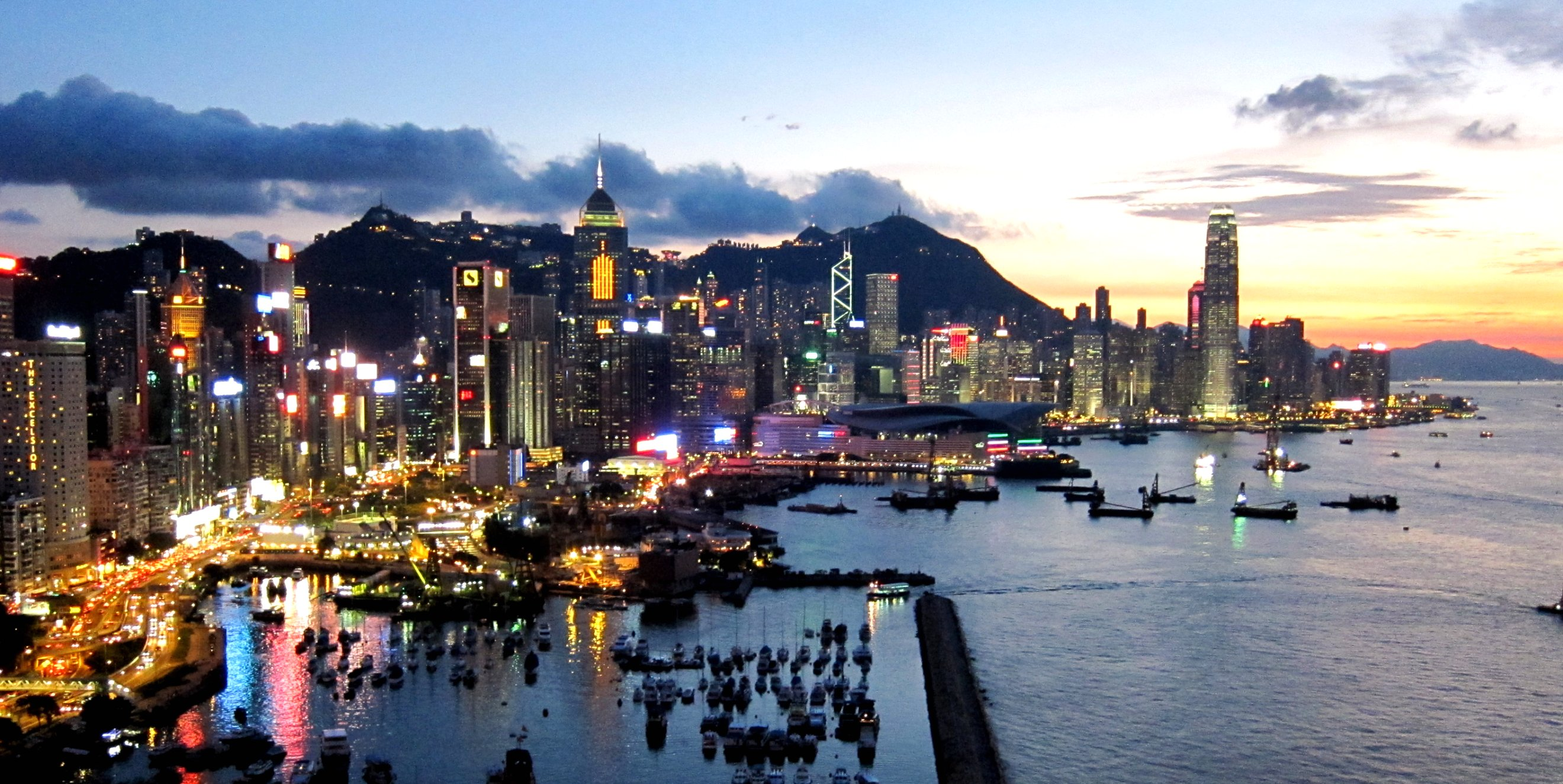
- Dusk view of Hong Kong Island as viewed from North Point, August 2011

- Location (in red) within Hong Kong

Geography
- Coordinates: 22°15′52″N 114°11′14″E
- Area: 78.59 km^{2} (30.34 sq mi)
- Highest elevation: 552 m (1811 ft)
- Highest point: Victoria Peak

Demographics
- Population: 1,188,500 (2023)
- Pop. density: 16,390/km^{2} (42450/sq mi)
- Ethnic groups: 85% Chinese; 5.6% Filipino; 2.6% Indonesian; 2.5% White

Hong Kong Island
- Traditional Chinese: 香港島
- Simplified Chinese: 香港岛
- Cantonese Yale: Hēunggóng dóu
- Jyutping: hoeng^{1} gong^{2} dou^{2}
Transcriptions
Standard Mandarin
- Hanyu Pinyin: Xiānggǎng dǎo
- Bopomofo: ㄒㄧㄤ ㄍㄤˇ ㄉㄠˇ
- Wade–Giles: Hsiang^{1}-kang^{3} Tao^{3}
- Tongyong Pinyin: Sianggǎng dǎo
- IPA: [ɕjáŋ.kàŋ tàʊ]
Wu
- Wugniu: shian^{1} kaon^{3} tau^{3}
- IPA: Shanghainese [ɕiã˥ kɑ̃˧ tɔ˨]
Hakka
- Romanization: Hiong^{1} gong^{3} dau^{3}
Yue: Cantonese
- Yale Romanization: Hēunggóng dóu
- Jyutping: hoeng^{1} gong^{2} dou^{2}
- IPA: [hœŋ˥ kɔŋ˧˥ tɔw˧˥]
Southern Min
- Hokkien POJ: Hiong-káng-tó

Hong Kong Island (Note: simplified Chinese: 香港岛; traditional Chinese: 香港島; pinyin: Xiānggǎngdǎo; Jyutping: hoeng^{1} gong^{2} dou^{2}; Cantonese Yale: Hēunggóng dóu) is an island in the southern part of Hong Kong. The island, known originally and on road signs simply as Hong Kong, has a land area of approximately 78.59 square kilometres (30.34 sq mi) and a population of 1,289,500 with a population density of 16,390 per square kilometre (42,400/sq mi), as of 2023. It is the second largest island in Hong Kong, with the largest being Lantau Island. Hong Kong Island forms one of the three areas of Hong Kong, with the other two being Kowloon and the New Territories.

In 1842, following the Qing dynasty's defeat at the First Opium War (1839–1842), Hong Kong Island was formally ceded in perpetuity to the United Kingdom under the Treaty of Nanking. The City of Victoria was then established on the island by British forces, named in honour of Queen Victoria. At that time, the island had a population of about 3,000 inhabitants scattered in a dozen fishing villages.

The northern-east part of the island, being known as the Central area is the historical, political, and economic centre of Hong Kong, with many government buildings being in the area, namely the Government House, Central Government Complex, Legislative Council Complex, Hong Kong Court of Final Appeal, and Hong Kong High Court. Many financial institutes and banks such as the Hong Kong Stock Exchange, Hong Kong Monetary Authority, HSBC, and Bank of China (Hong Kong) are also based in the area.

The northern coast of the island forms the southern shore of the Victoria Harbour, which is largely responsible for the development of Hong Kong due to its deep waters favoured by large trade ships. The island is home to many famous tourists sights, such as "The Peak", Ocean Park, Former Central Police Station Compound, Murray House, and many other historical sites and various large shopping centres. The mountain ranges across the island are also famous for hiking.

The northern part of Hong Kong Island, together with Kowloon and Tsuen Wan New Town, forms the "core urban area" of Hong Kong. Their combined area is approximately 88.30 square kilometres (34.1 square miles) and their combined population is approximately 3,156,500, reflecting a higher population density of 35,700 people/km^{2} (92,000 people/mi^{2}). The island is often referred to locally as "Hong Kong side" or "Island side". The suffix "-side" is also applied to other locations in Hong Kong, the sole remnant of which being "Kowloon side" when referring to the other side of Victoria Harbour.

== History ==
=== Prehistoric and Imperial China period ===
Human settlement of the area dates back 6,000 years ago, as evidenced by Neolithic artifacts discovered in Stanley, Hong Kong Island.

In 214 BC, the Qin dynasty defeated the Baiyue, and absorbed areas of what is now Guangdong, Guangxi, and northern Vietnam. Hong Kong Island was part of the annexed land and was listed under the jurisdiction of Panyu County (番禺縣) of the Nanhai Commandery (南海郡). On the sixth year of the Eastern Jin dynasty (AD 331), Hong Kong Island was listed under the jurisdiction of Bao'an County (寶安縣).

Copper coins from the Sui, Tang and Song dynasty were unearthed in where the Royal Hong Kong Yacht Club is presently located at, on where Kellett Island would have been prior to the land reclamation connecting the island to Causeway Bay in 1969. This suggests that during these periods of times, the island already had its own commercial activity. Song dynasty copper coins served as universal currency in transregional trade.

During the Wanli period of the Ming dynasty (1573), Hong Kong Island belonged to the territory of Xin'an County, and remained so until 1661, when the great clearance was issued by the Shunzhi Emperor of the Qing dynasty, forcing residents in coastal areas of Guangdong, Fujian, Zhejiang, Jiangnan, and Shandong to move in-land, to prevent the loyalists of the Ming dynasty in Formosa from approaching the shores of the Mainland and seek help from residents of the coastal areas.

The ban was lifted when the remnants of the Ming dynasty were exterminated in 1669, though not many original residents of Hong Kong Island returned to the area. Piracy was rampant in the area until the island was ceded to the United Kingdom in 1842.

=== British colony ===
Following the First Opium War (1839–1842), Hong Kong Island was ceded to Great Britain in 1842 under the Treaty of Nanking and the territory became a Crown colony. At the time, the island's population was only 7,450.

==== Japanese invasion and occupation ====
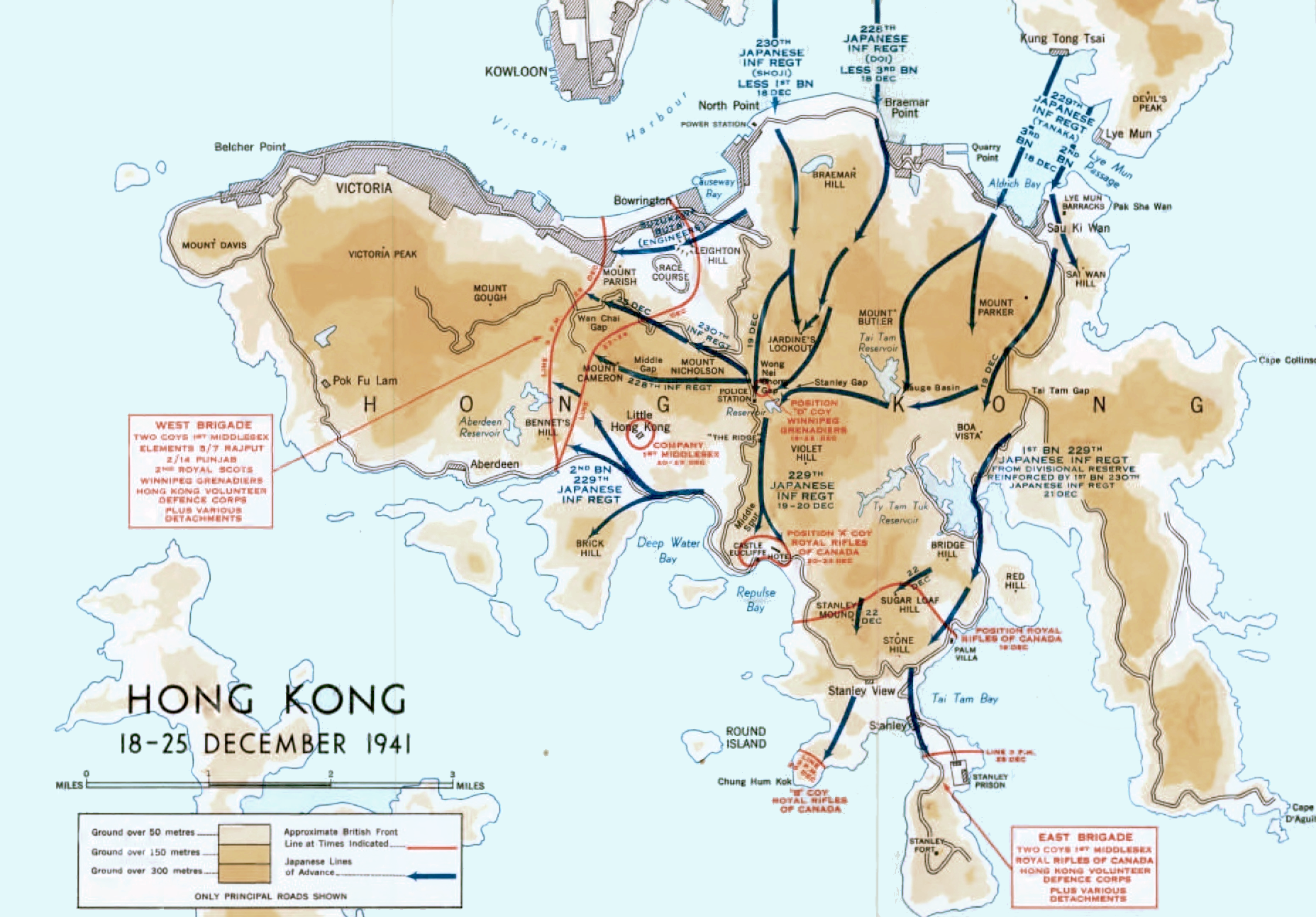
A map of the Japanese invasion of Hong Kong island in December 1941

The Second World War was a dark period for Hong Kong. In the 1930s, the British anticipated a Japanese attack on Hong Kong. As the Wong Nai Chung Gap was a strategically important location of defence, large-scale defensive works were constructed there, including anti-aircraft batteries, howitzer positions and machine gun nests.

The Battle of Hong Kong began on 8 December 1941. British, Canadian and Indian armies and the Hong Kong Volunteer Defence Forces resisted the Japanese invasion commanded by Sakai Takashi, which began eight hours after the attack on Pearl Harbor. However, the Japanese took control of the Hong Kong skies on the first day of attack and outnumbered the defenders, which retreated from the Gin Drinkers Line and consequently from Kowloon under heavy aerial bombardment and artillery barrage.

On 18 December, the Japanese had conquered North Point, reaching the Wong Nai Chung Gap on the following day. British forces and the Canadian Winnipeg Grenadiers vigorously defended the crucial point of Wong Nai Chung Gap, and for a while successfully secured the passage between Central and the secluded southern parts of the island. Japanese casualties were about 600. However, Allied forces there were ultimately defeated by the Japanese on 23 December, and Wong Nai Chung Reservoir was lost. As Wan Chai Gap had also fallen that same day, the British surrendered.

Hong Kong surrendered to the Japanese on 25 December 1941, thereafter often called "Black Christmas" by locals as the surrender was on Christmas. The Governor of Hong Kong, Mark Young, surrendered in-person at the temporary Japanese headquarters, on the third floor of the Peninsula Hotel, thus beginning the Japanese occupation of Hong Kong. Isogai Rensuke became the first Japanese governor of Hong Kong. Hyper-inflation and food rationing followed; and the Japanese declared Hong Kong Dollars illegal. The Japanese enforced a repatriation policy throughout the period of occupation due to the scarcity of food and the possible counter-attack of the Allies. As a result, the unemployed were deported to the Mainland, and the population of Hong Kong had dwindled from 1.6 million in 1941 to 600,000 in 1945.

==== Post Second World War ====
The population of Hong Kong Island grew exponentially after the Second World War and the Communist revolution in China. It became apparent that the lands in the old Central District were insufficient to accommodate the population. Many undeveloped or underdeveloped areas Hong Kong Island such as North Point, Shau Kei Wan, Aberdeen and Wong Chuk Hang began its development and urbanisation. These areas initially started off as industrialised areas, with some areas such as Quarry Bay, Wan Chai and Causeway Bay later becoming new commercial centres when Hong Kong moved away from its period of industrialisation, as these areas provided relatively cheaper rent than the traditional commercial district of Central.

On 1 July 1997, the sovereignty of Hong Kong Island was transferred to the People's Republic of China alongside Kowloon Peninsula and the New Territories, ending 156 years of British rule on Hong Kong Island.

== Administration, suburbs and localities ==
Despite Hong Kong Island being an island, it is not part of the Islands District. Four districts of Hong Kong are located on the island:

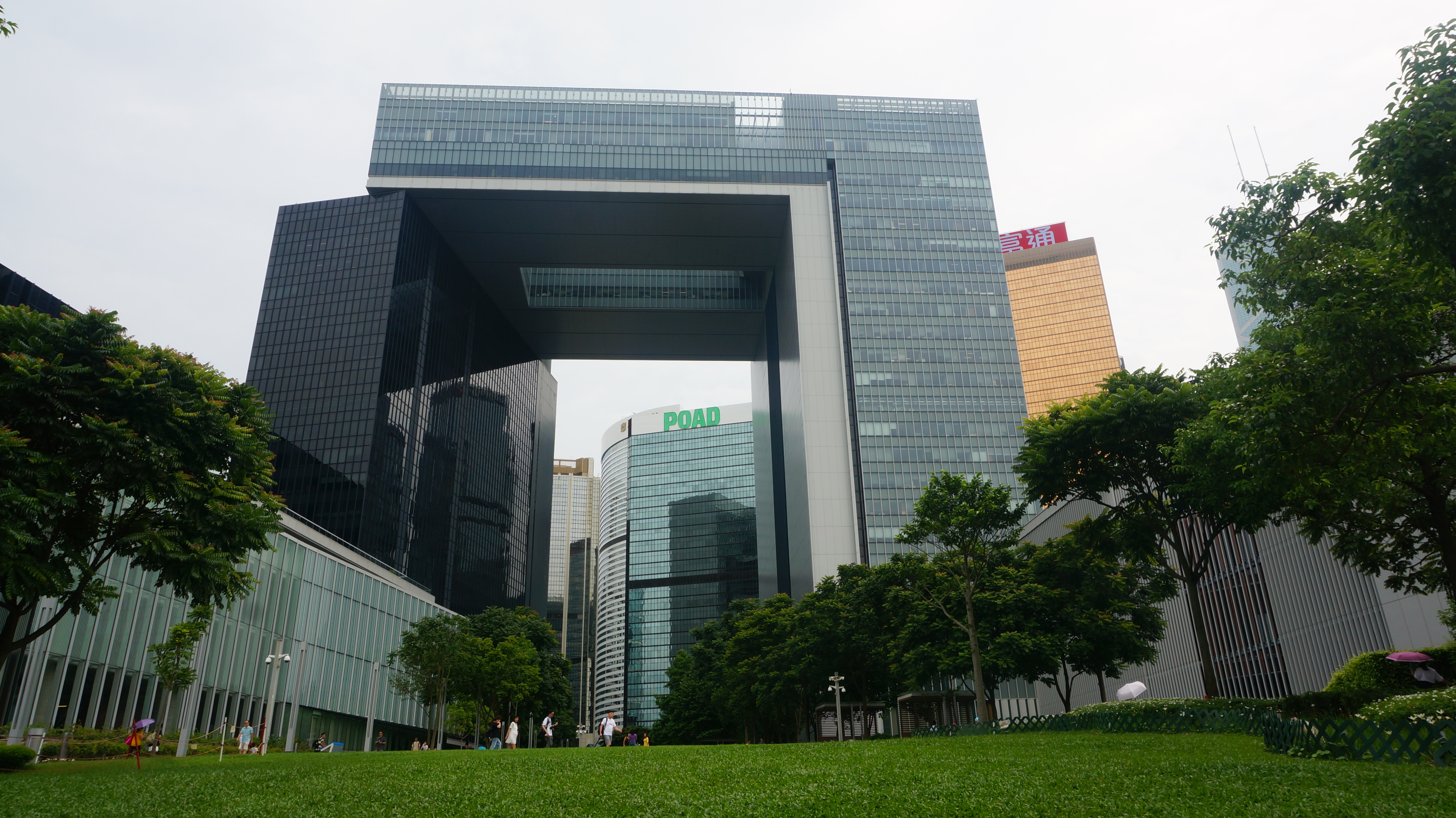
Central Government Complex in Tamar, Central

=== Central and Western District ===
- Central (Admiralty, Tamar)
- Green Island and Little Green Island
- Lung Fu Shan (University of Hong Kong)
- Mid-Levels (West and Central) (SoHo)
- Mount Davis
- Sai Wan (Sai Ying Pun, Shek Tong Tsui (Belcher Point) and Kennedy Town)
- Sheung Wan
- Victoria Peak

Tai Hang Fire Dragon performance in Tai Hang, Causeway Bay

=== Wan Chai District ===
- Causeway Bay (Tai Hang, Tin Hau and Victoria Park)
- Happy Valley
- Jardine's Lookout
- So Kon Po
- Mid-Levels (East)
- Wan Chai

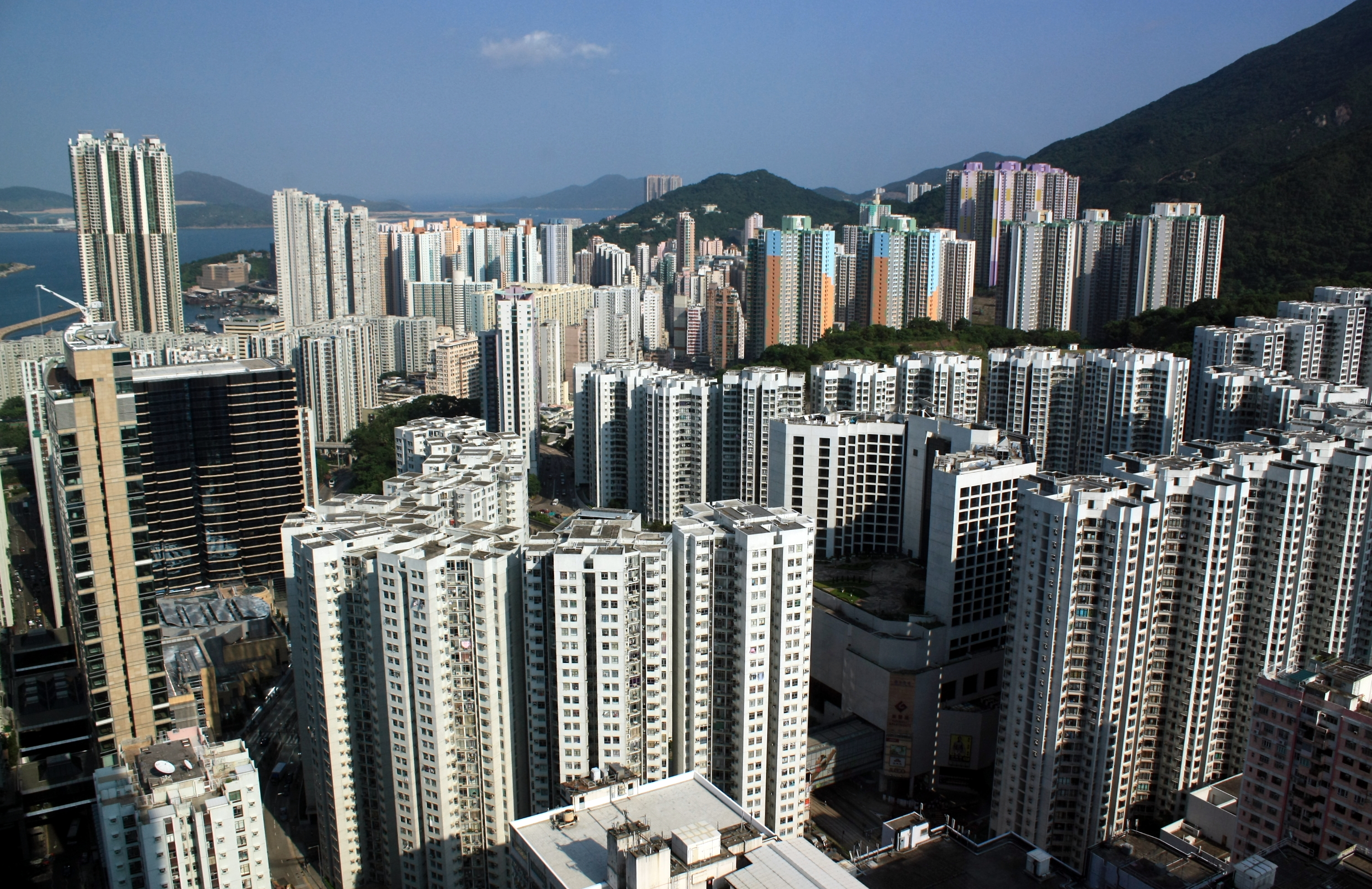
Kornhill and Shau Kei Wan, located in the northern part of Eastern District

=== Eastern District ===
- Braemar Hill
- Chai Wan (Pamela Youde Nethersole Eastern Hospital)
- Fortress Hill
- Mid-Levels (North)
- North Point
- Shau Kei Wan
- Siu Sai Wan
- Quarry Bay (Taikoo Shing, Kornhill)

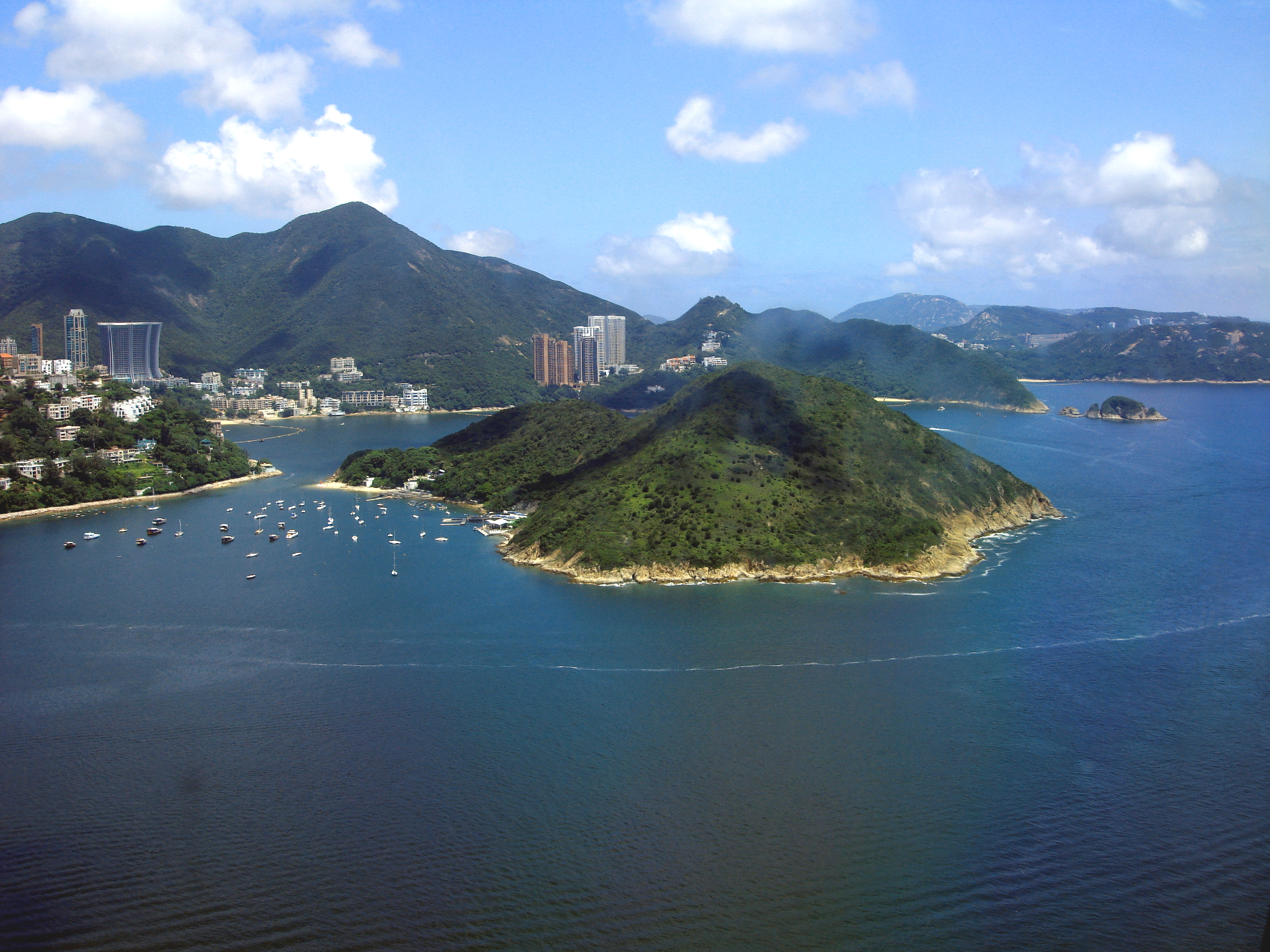
A view of Middle Island (foreground) and Repulse Bay (background) from the Ocean Park cable car ride in the Southern District

=== Southern District ===
- Aberdeen
- Ap Lei Chau (Note: The island is part of the Southern District but is geographically separated from Hong Kong Island.)
- Big Wave Bay
- Cyberport
- Pok Fu Lam (Queen Mary Hospital, Sandy Bay)
- Repulse Bay
- Shek O
- Stanley
- Tai Tam
- Tin Wan
- Wong Chuk Hang (Ocean Park)

=== Legislative Council Constituencies ===
Since 2021, Hong Kong Island West and Hong Kong Island East have been the two Legislative Council geographical constituencies in Hong Kong Island. Between 1997 and 2021, Hong Kong Island was one geographical constituency of itself.
Between 1995 and 1997 however, Hong Kong Island consisted of four geographical constituencies, with them being Hong Kong Island Central, Hong Kong Island East, Hong Kong Island South and Hong Kong Island West. In the previous council from 1991 to 1995, Hong Kong Island consisted of two geographical constituencies, Hong Kong Island West and Hong Kong Island East, similar to current arrangements.

== Island Landscape ==
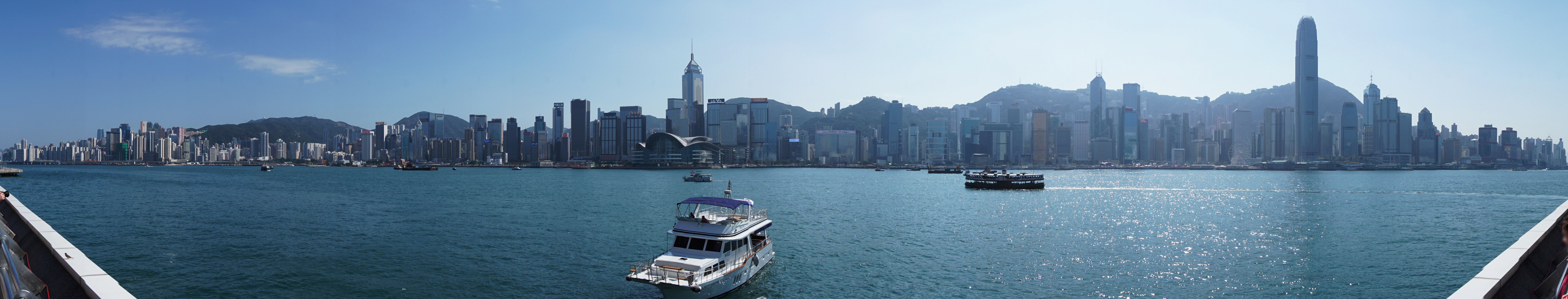
Hong Kong Island Panorama
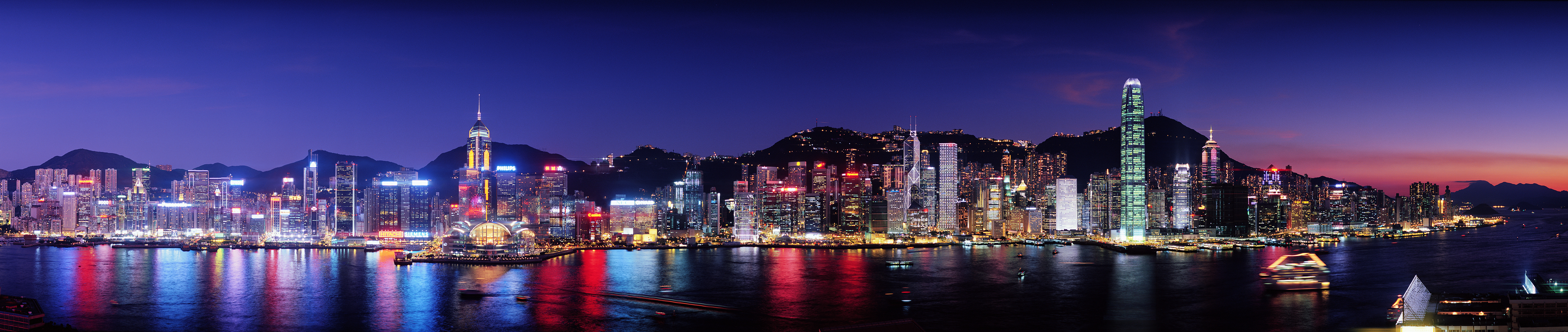
Hong Kong Island at night

== Geography ==
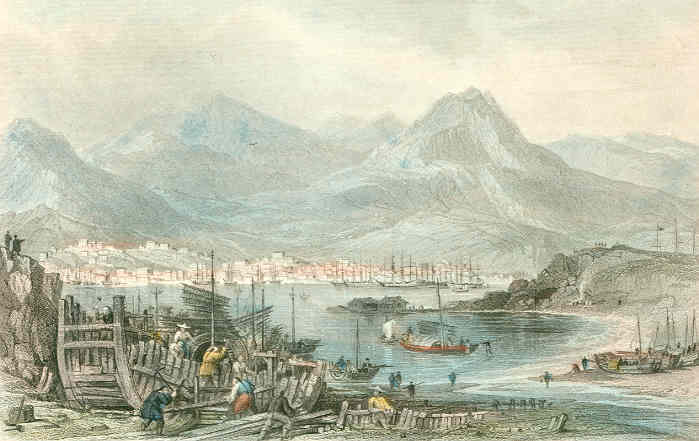
Hong Kong Island in 1840 by Stoddart R.N.

Hong Kong Island is the second-largest island of the territory, the largest being Lantau Island. Its area is 78.59 km^{2} (30.34 sq mi), including 6.98 km^{2} (2.69 sq mi) of land reclaimed since 1887 and some smaller scale ones since 1851. It makes up approximately 7% of the total territory. It is separated from the mainland of the territory (Kowloon Peninsula and New Territories) by the Victoria Harbour.

=== Mountains, peaks and hills ===
Most hills across the middle of the island are included within the country parks.

Name	Height (in metres)	Country Park	District
Victoria Peak (Note: Named after British monarch Queen Victoria, it is also known as Mount Austin, named after former Auditor General, Colonial Secretary and Administrator of Hong Kong John Gardiner Austin and is known locally as The Peak. Victoria Peak was once a volcano)	552	Pok Fu Lam Country Park	Central and Western District
Mount Parker (Note: Named after Admiral of the Fleet Sir William Parker, 1st Baronet, of Shenstone)	532	Tai Tam Country Park	Eastern District
Mount Kellett (Note: Named after Admiral Sir Henry Kellett)	501		Central and Western District
High West	494	Pok Fu Lam Country Park	Central and Western District
Mount Gough (Note: Named after Field Marshal Hugh Gough, 1st Viscount Gough, British Commander-in-Chief, China and Commander-in-Chief, India)	479		Central and Western District
Mount Cameron (Note: Named after British Army General Sir William Gordon Cameron, former Administrator of Hong Kong)	439	Aberdeen Country Park	Wan Chai District
Mount Butler	436	Tai Tam Country Park	Eastern District
Violet Hill	433	Tai Tam Country Park	Southern District
Jardine's Lookout (Note: Named after British merchant William Jardine and Hong Jardine Matheson)	433	Tai Tam Country Park	Wan Chai District
Mount Nicholson (Note: Named after Lieutenant W.C.A. Nicholson, Hong Kong Volunteer Corps Adjutant)	430	Aberdeen Country Park	Wan Chai District
Siu Ma Shan	424	Tai Tam Country Park	Eastern District
The Twins South	386	Tai Tam Country Park	Southern District
The Twins North	363	Tai Tam Country Park	Southern District
Mount Collinson	348	Shek O Country Park	Southern District
D'Aguilar Peak (Note: Named after British Army Major-General Sir George Charles D'Aguilar, Former Lieutenant Governor of Hong Kong)	325	Shek O Country Park	Southern District
Pottinger Peak (Note: Named after Lieutenant General Sir Henry Pottinger, 1st Governor of Hong Kong and former East India Company Colonel)	312		Eastern District
Brick Hill (Note: Also known as Nam Long Shan)	284		Southern District
Mount Davis (Note: Named after Sir John Francis Davis, 2nd Governor of Hong Kong)	269		Central and Western District
Lung Fu Shan (Note: Also known as Hill Above Belcher's)	253	Lung Fu Shan Country Park	Central and Western District
Braemar Hill (Note: Likely named after the Scottish village of Braemar by British officials)	200		Eastern District
Shouson Hill (Note: Named after Sir Chow Shouson, Senior official in the Qing dynasty and later prominent businessman and politician in Hong Kong)	140		Southern District
Leighton Hill			Wan Chai District
Morrison Hill (Note: Named after John Robert Morrison, Chinese interpreter and British linguist and Colonial Secretary. The hill was levelled Praya at the time of the Praya East Reclamation Scheme in the 1920s which used its constituent rock/earth to reclaim land from the harbour, extending the shoreline away from the area.)			Wan Chai District
Mount Parish (Note: Named after Commodore John E. Parish, Naval Officer commanding of China Station between 1873 and 1876)			Wan Chai District

=== Hiking trail ===
The main hiking trail on Hong Kong Island is the Hong Kong Trail, which is 50 kilometers long and is divided into 8 sections. The trail starts in Victoria Gap on the peak and ends in Big Wave Bay. Sections 1 and 2 of the Wilson Trail across the New Territories of Hong Kong and Kowloon also passes through Tai Tam Country Park and its Quarry Bay Extension.

=== Marine reserve ===
The only marine reserve in Hong Kong, the Cape D'Aguilar Marine Reserve, is located on the southern tip of the island in Cape D'Aguilar. It was opened in July 1996 and has a sea area of approximately 20 hectares. The reserve was set up for the purpose of the conservation of marine resources, scientific studies and education for the appreciation of precious marine resources. Visits to the marine reserve by the public is discouraged, with water sports and coastal recreational activities prohibited in the area. It is managed by the Agriculture, Fisheries and Conservation Department.

=== Beaches ===
Many public beaches are also located in the Southern District of Hong Kong Island, which being the Deep Water Bay, Repulse Bay, Middle Bay, South Bay, Chung Hom Kok Beach, St. Stephen's Beach, Stanley Main Beach, Hair Pin Beach, Turtle Cove Beach, Shek O, and Big Wave Bay. These are all popular locations for water sports and activities. All public beaches are managed by the Leisure and Cultural Services Department.

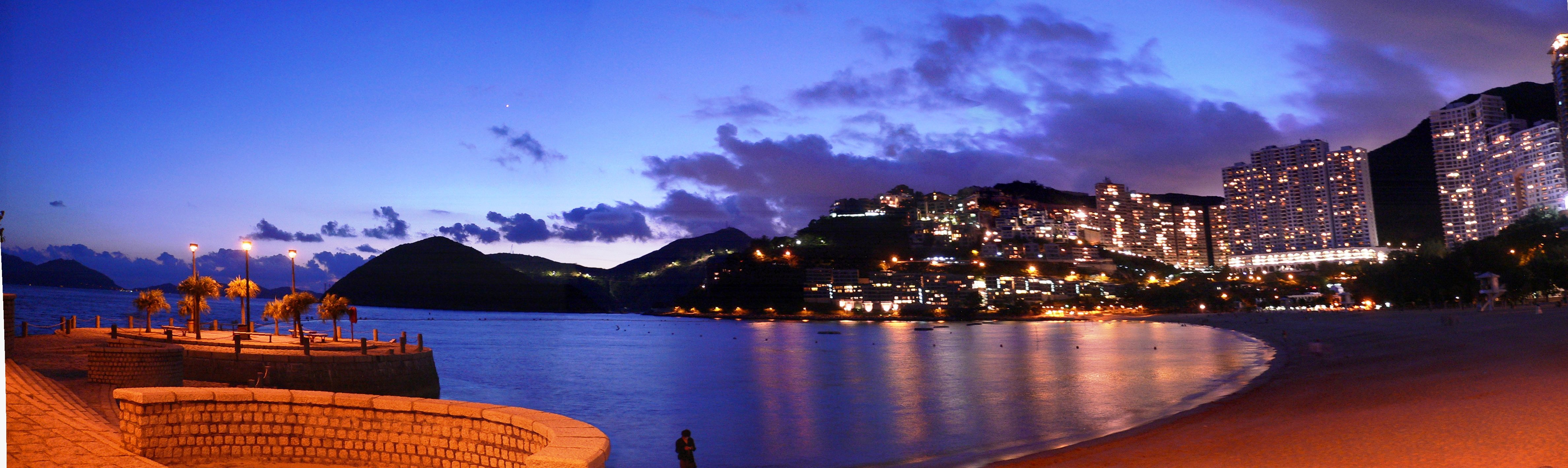
Repulse Bay at night

== Declared Monuments ==
Due to the early development of Hong Kong Island, many historical buildings can be found there.

=== Central and Western District ===
==== Government Building ====
- Hong Kong City Hall
- The Exterior of the Old Supreme Court
- Flagstaff House
- Government House
- Gate Lodge of the Former Mountain Lodge
- Central Police Station Compound
- Former Central Magistracy
- Victoria Prison Compound
- The Cenotaph
- Western Market
- Green Island Lighthouse Compound
- The facade of the Old Mental Hospital

==== Educational Institute ====
- The Exterior of the Main Building, the University of Hong Kong
- The Exterior of Hung Hing Ying Building, the University of Hong Kong
- The Exterior of Tang Chi Ngong Building, the University of Hong Kong
- The Exterior of Fung Ping Shan Building, the University of Hong Kong
- The Exterior of Eliot Hall, the University of Hong Kong
- The Exterior of May Hall, the University of Hong Kong
- Main Building of St. Stephen's Girls' College
- King's College
- North and West Blocks of St. Joseph's College
- Bonham Road Government Primary School

==== Religious Building ====
- St. John's Cathedral
- Jamia Mosque
- Man Mo Temple Compound

===== Others =====
- Duddell Street Steps and Gas Lamps
- Kom Tong Hall
- Old Pathological Institute
- Former French Mission Building
- The Helena May Main Building

=== Wan Chai District ===
==== Government Building ====
- Old Wan Chai Post Office

==== Religious Building ====
- Tin Hau Temple
- Lin Fa Temple
- Yuk Hui Temple
- Tung Lin Kok Yuen

==== Others ====
- The Race Course Fire Memorial
- King Yin Lei

=== Eastern District ===
- Law Uk Hakka House
- Block 7, 10 and 25 of the old Lei Yue Mun Barracks
- Rock Carving at Cape Collinson

=== Southern District ===
==== Government Building ====
- Old Stanley Police Station
- Cape D'Aguilar Lighthouse
- The Masonry Bridge of Pok Fu Lam Reservoir
- 6 Historic Structures of Pok Fu Lam Reservoir
- 22 Historic Structures of Tai Tam Group of Reservoirs
- 3 Historic Structures of Wong Nai Chung Reservoir
- 4 Historic Structures of Aberdeen Reservoir

==== Educational Institute ====
- The Exterior of University Hall, the University of Hong Kong
- School House of St. Stephen's College

==== Religious Building ====
- Hung Shing Temple

==== Others ====
- Rock Carvings at Big Wave Bay
- Rock Carvings at Wong Chuk Hang
- Tung Wah Coffin Home
- Béthanie

== Demographics ==
As of 2023, the population of Hong Kong Island is approximately 1,188,500, making up approximately 15.8% of the 7,536,100 in Hong Kong. Its population density is higher than the whole of Hong Kong, c. 18,000 per km^{2}. However, the population is heavily concentrated along the northern shore. The combined population of Central and Western, Wan Chai, and Eastern is 925,200, giving this urbanised part of the island a density of around 22,500 per km^{2}, or 58,000 per mi^{2}, in its approximately 41.3 km^{2} (15.9 sq mi).

The residents living in the Central and Western District and Wan Chai District have the highest median household income compared with the other districts in Hong Kong. Affluent districts on Hong Kong Island are The Peak, Western Mid-Levels (Conduit Road/Robinson Road/Magazine Gap Road/Kotewall Road etc.), Eastern Mid-Levels (Happy Valley/Tai Hang/Jardine's Lookout), Tai Tam, Deep Water Bay and Repulse Bay.

As of 2021, 85% of Hong Kong Island's residents are of Chinese descent. The largest ethnic minority groups are Filipinos (5.6%), Indonesians (2.6%), and White people (2.5%)

As of 2021, 80.4% of Hong Kong Island's residents use Cantonese as their usual language, while 10.6% use English and 3.3% use Mandarin. 2.8% of the residents use Chinese dialects other than Cantonese and Mandarin as their usual language and 2.9% use languages not listed above as their usual language.

== Transportation ==
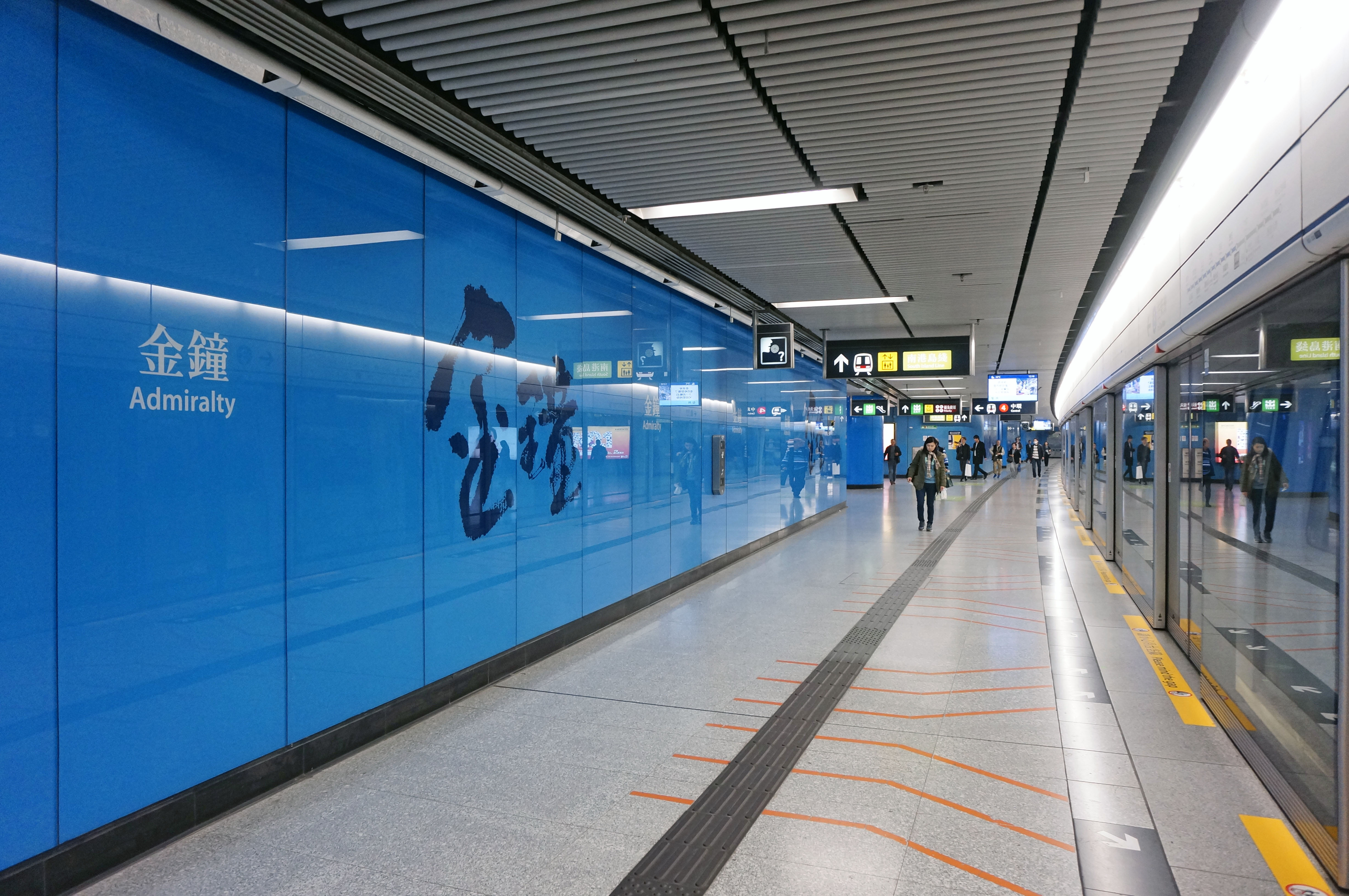
Admiralty MTR station, the interchange station between the Tsuen Wan line, Island line, East Rail line, and South Island line

=== Rail ===
Seven of the MTR rapid transit system's ten lines service Hong Kong Island. The Island line and South Island line run exclusively on the four districts of Hong Kong Island, with the Island line serving the north shore at 17 stations, and the South Island line connecting four stations on Ap Lei Chau and in Wong Chuk Hang to the north shore at Admiralty station. Five MTR lines – the Tsuen Wan line, the Tseung Kwan O line, the Tung Chung line, the Airport Express – connect the north shore with Kowloon and provide onward service to the New Territories, and the East Rail line which provides another cross-harbour connection upon its extension from Hung Hom station to Admiralty station. In future, the planned North Island line infrastructure project would extend both the Tung Chung line and the Tseung Kwan O line to connect them to each other, forming a route parallel to the middle section of the Island line.

Two other rail systems, Hong Kong Tramways and the Peak Tram, also run exclusively on Hong Kong Island. The former runs mostly parallel to the Island line between Kennedy Town and Shau Kei Wan, with a loop linking Causeway Bay and Happy Valley; the latter is a funicular linking Central District to Victoria Peak.

Geographically accurate maps

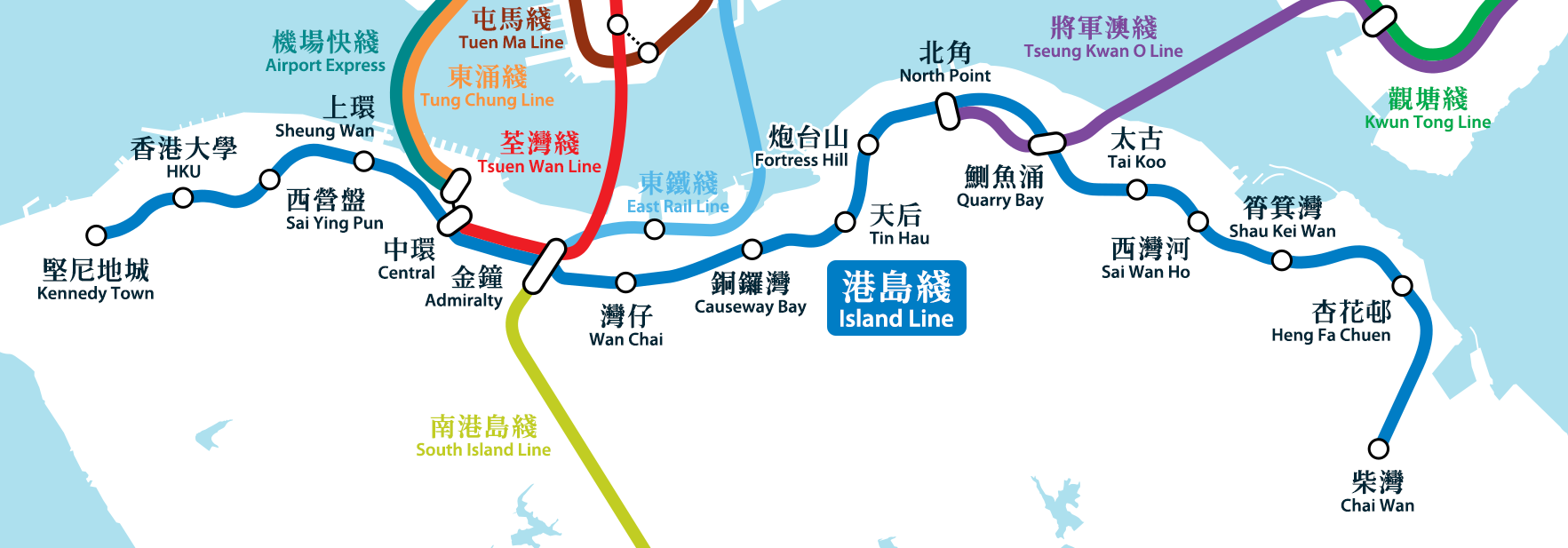
Island Line

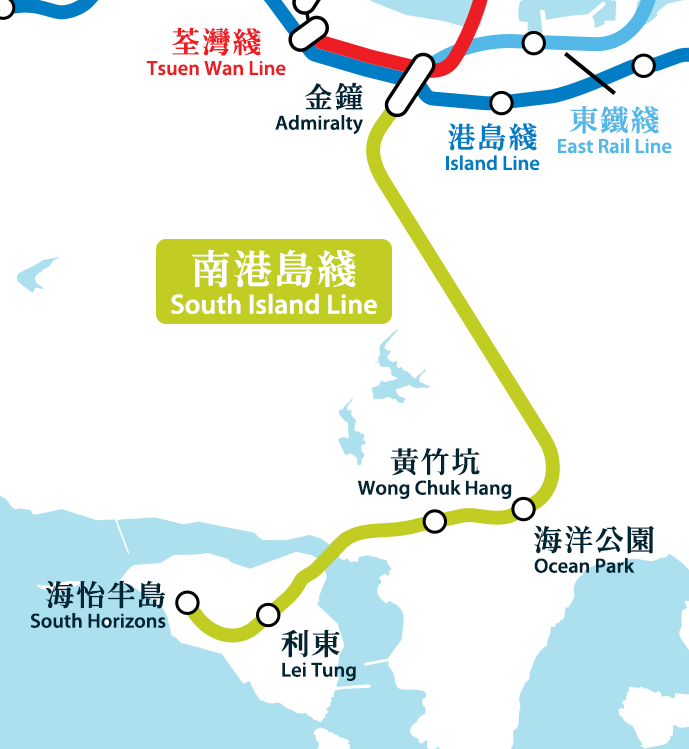
South Island line

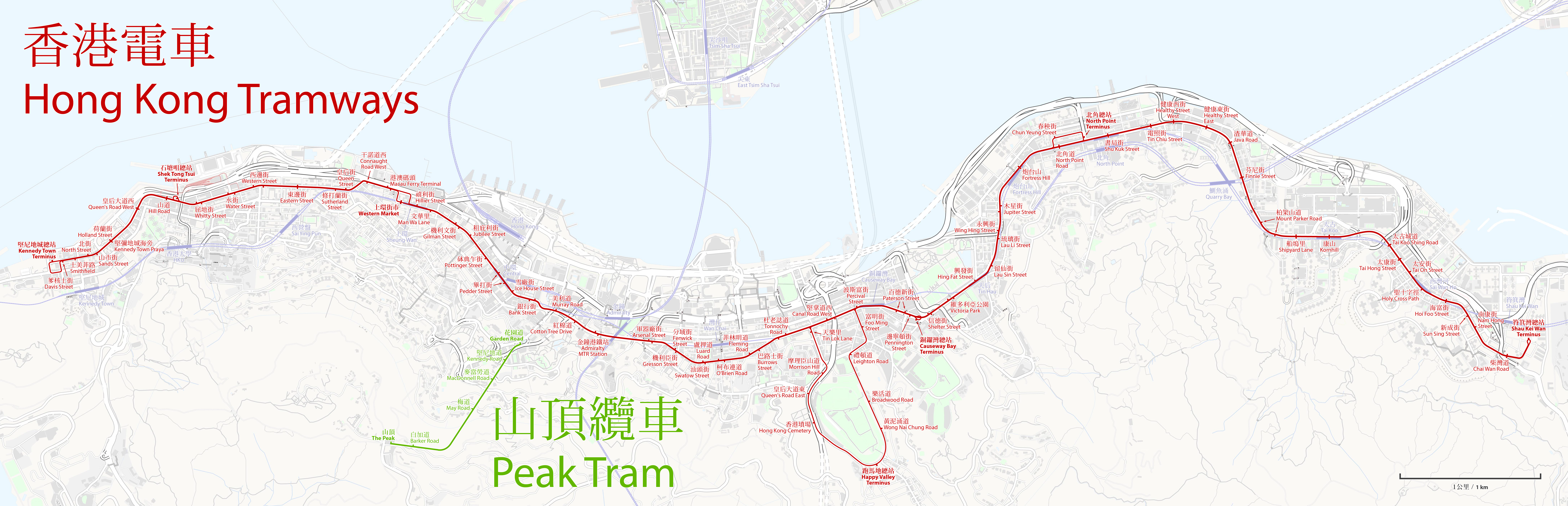
Hong Kong Tramways and Peak Tram

=== Maritime Transport ===
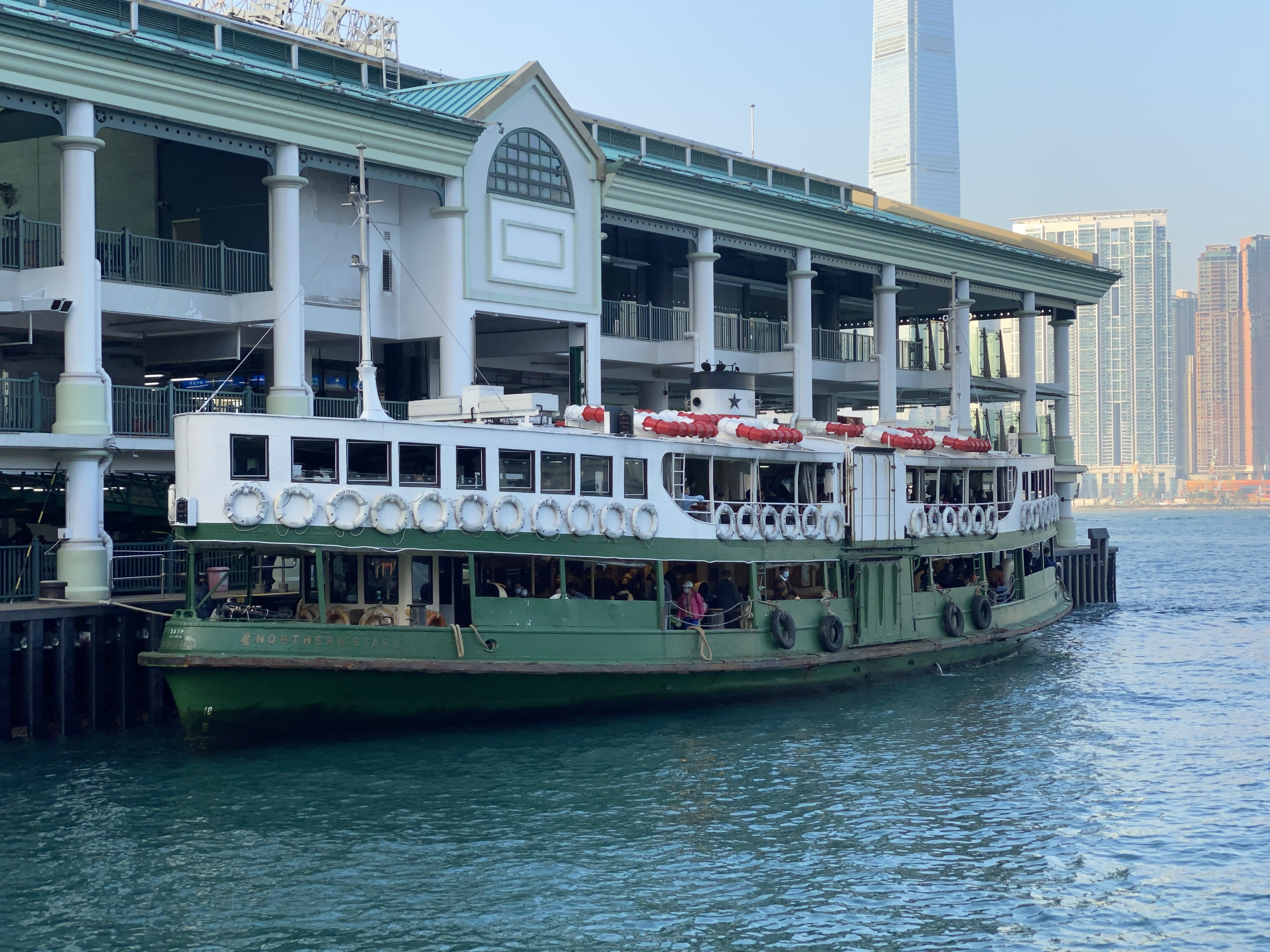
An iconic ferry of the Star Ferry docked at the Central Ferry Pier

Hong Kong Island has four ferry terminals, them being the Central Ferry Piers, North Point Ferry Pier, Sai Wan Ho Ferry Pier and Wan Chai Ferry Pier. Frequently ferry services are provided from these piers to the Kowloon Peninsula and the outlying islands. A departure terminal, the Hong Kong Macau Ferry Terminal is located in Sheung Wan to provide turbojet ferry services to Macau.

A tourist sightseeing ferry service, branded as the "Water Taxi" is also offered. The ferry service travels in the Victoria Harbour to sightseeing attractions of Hong Kong, such as the Hong Kong Observation Wheel, International Financial Centre, Tsim Sha Tsui Promenade, West Kowloon Cultural District and Kai Tak Cruise Terminal. It has 4 drop off points.

Public piers are also alongside the Victoria Harbour, such as the famous now-demolished Queen's Pier in Central and now-relocated Blake Pier in Stanley, which mainly provides passenger pick-up and drop-off services for small barges, yachts and sightseeing boats. Public piers are located mainly along the Victoria Harbour mainly in Causeway Bay, Central, Shau Kei Wan, Wan Chai, and also in Aberdeen, Ap Lei Chau and Stanley, places in the Southern District.

=== Roads ===
Major roads on Hong Kong Island include Connaught Road, Des Voeux Road, King's Road, Queen's Road.

=== Tunnels ===
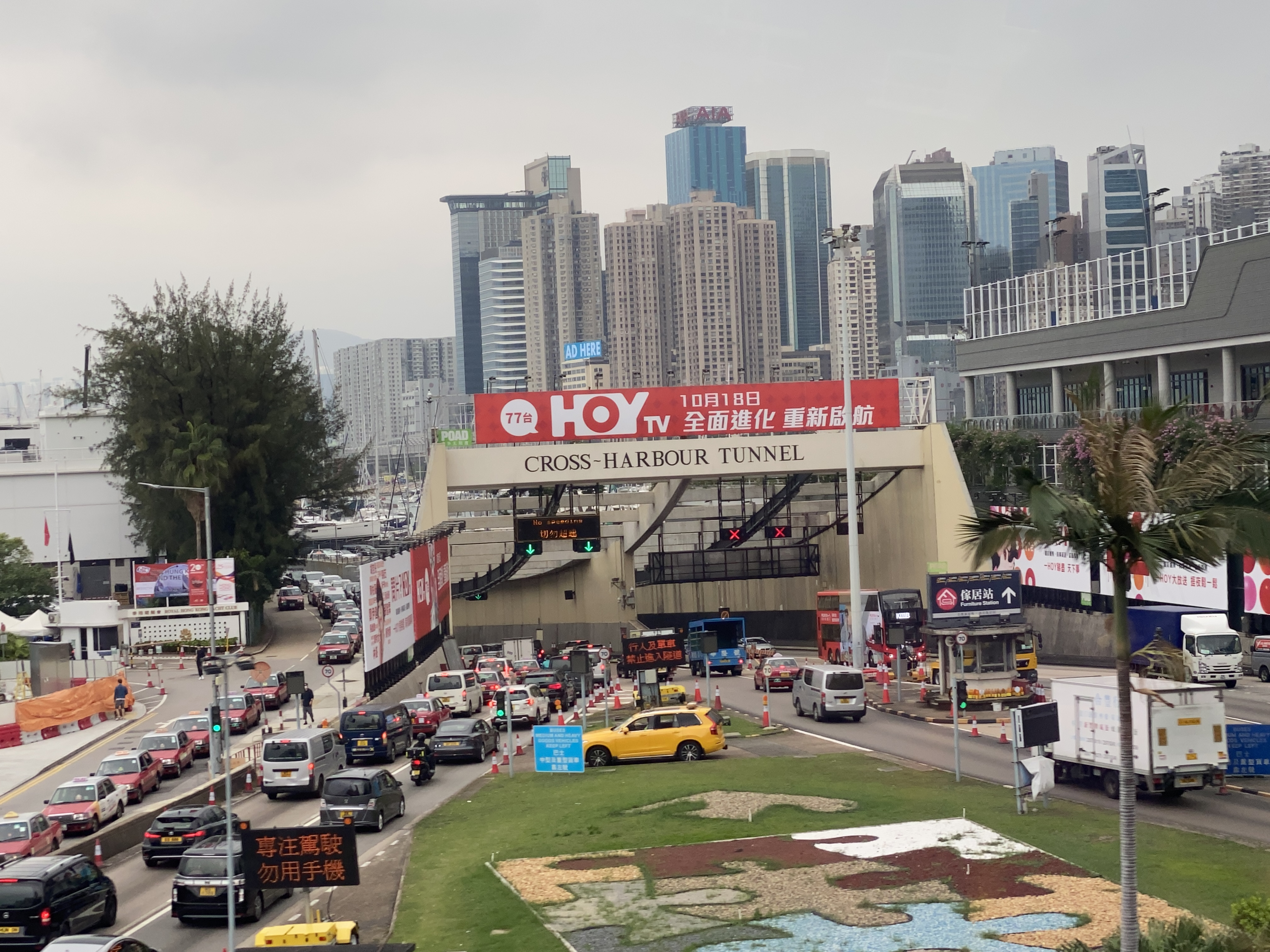
Hong Kong Island portal of the Cross-Harbour Tunnel, one of the tunnels linking Hong Kong Island and the Kowloon Peninsula

Hong Kong Island is connected to the Kowloon Peninsula on the mainland by two road-only tunnels (the Cross-Harbour Tunnel and the Western Harbour Crossing), three MTR railway tunnels (East Rail line, Tsuen Wan line and Tung Chung line/Airport Express) and one combined road and MTR rail link tunnel (Eastern Harbour Crossing, containing the Tseung Kwan O line and road traffic in separate parallel conduits).

Besides these harbour crossing tunnels, Hong Kong Island also has two tunnels travelling across the island itself, the Aberdeen Tunnel and Central–Wan Chai Bypass, which were opened in March 1982 and January 2019 respectively.

The Aberdeen Tunnel provides a link from Happy Valley and Wong Chuk Hang, with the toll fee being HK$5.

The Central–Wan Chai Bypass provides a link from Sheung Wan to Wan Chai North and the Eastern Corridor beyond Causeway Bay. It was built as part of the Central and Wan Chai Reclamation and is part of Route 4. The bypass is toll-free.

=== Bridges ===
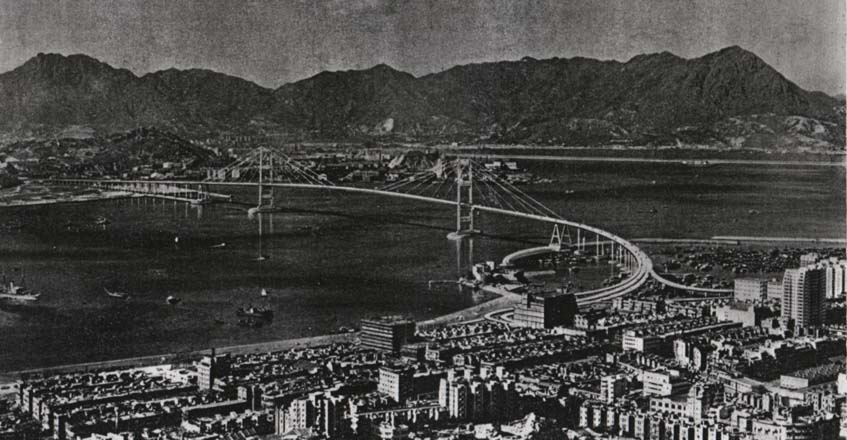
A picture of a simulated model of a proposed bridge over the Victoria Harbour from the 1950s

There are no bridges between the island and Kowloon, although two bridges – the Ap Lei Chau Bridge, a road bridge, and Aberdeen Channel Bridge, part of the South Island line – connect the Hong Kong island to Ap Lei Chau.

The Ap Lei Chau Bridge is a combination of two bridges, built separately in 1980 and 1994. It was built to accommodate the growing population in Ap Lei Chau, which the residents could only access the island by boats prior to the construction of the bridge.

=== Central-Mid Levels escalator and walkway system ===
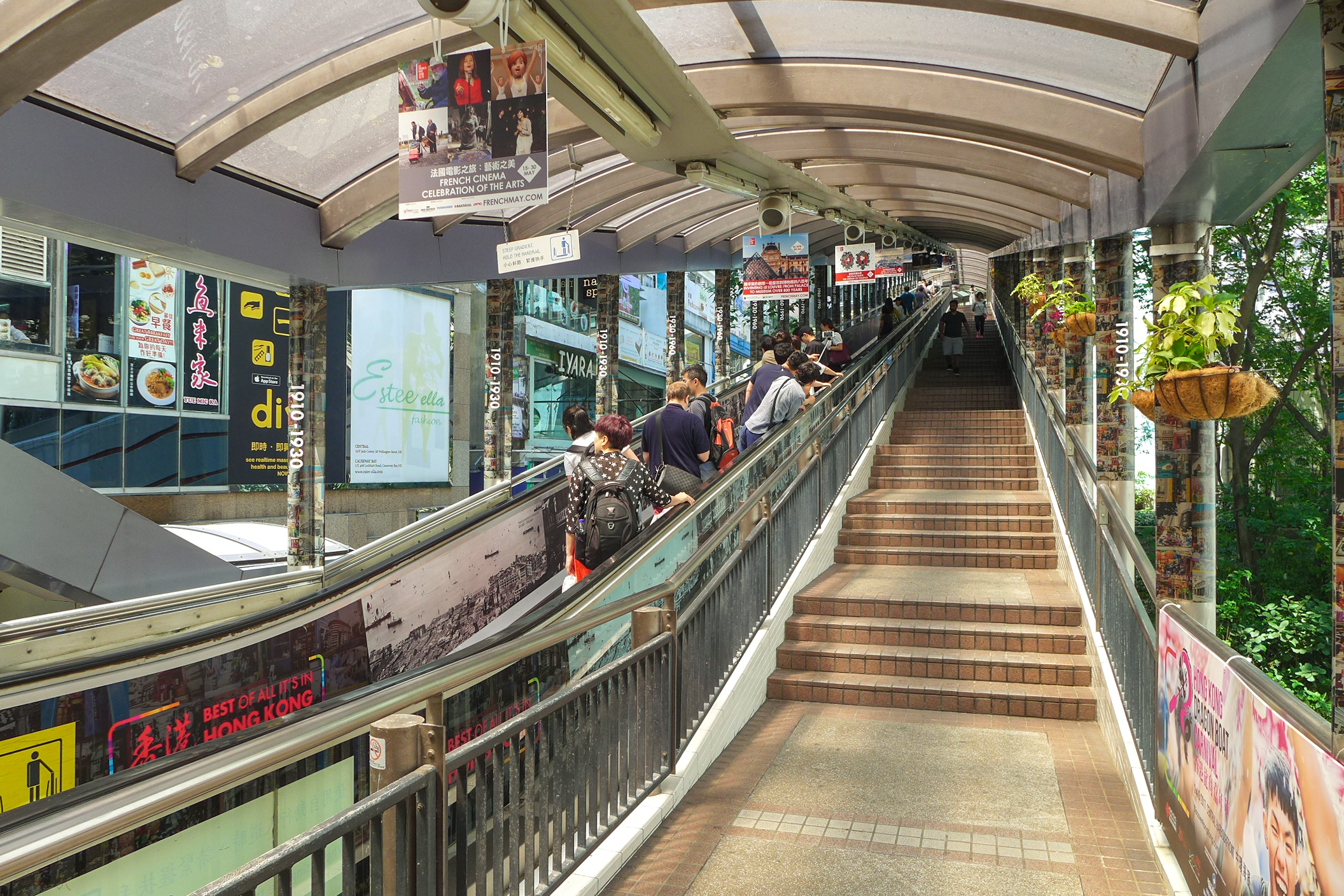
An uphill-running escalator of the Central-Mid-Levels Escalator and Walkway System

The Central-Mid Levels escalator and walkway system is the longest outdoor covered escalator system in the world. It was opened in 1993 to provide relief to traffic in the Mid-Levels. It travels from Queen's Road Central to Conduit Road, with the total horizontal distance being over 800 m (2,600 ft) and total vertical distance being over 135 m (443 ft). It consists of covered walkways, 16 reversible one-way escalators and 3 reversible one-way travelators. Restaurants, bars and shops can be found alongside the system. In addition to providing transportation, it is a tourist attraction for many visiting Hong Kong. As of late 2016, around 78,000 pedestrians make their trips using the system.

== See also ==
- Conservation in Hong Kong
- List of islands and peninsulas of Hong Kong
- List of places in Hong Kong
- List of streets and roads in Hong Kong
- List of islands by population density
