= Tai Tam Country Park =

Country park in the Tai Tam area in Hong Kong Island

Coordinates: 22.25701°N 114.20262°E

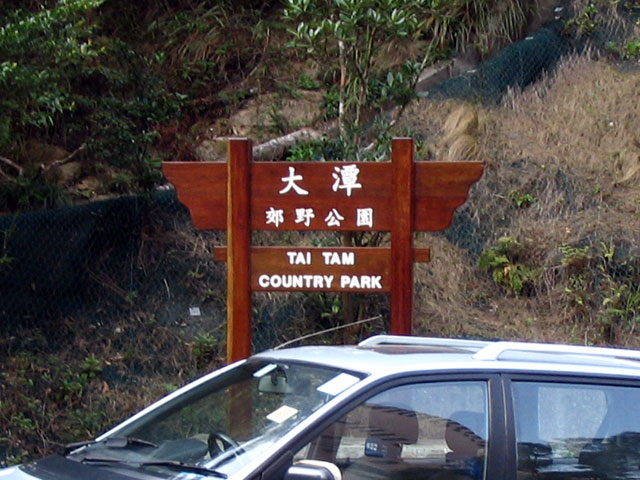
Tai Tam Country Park.

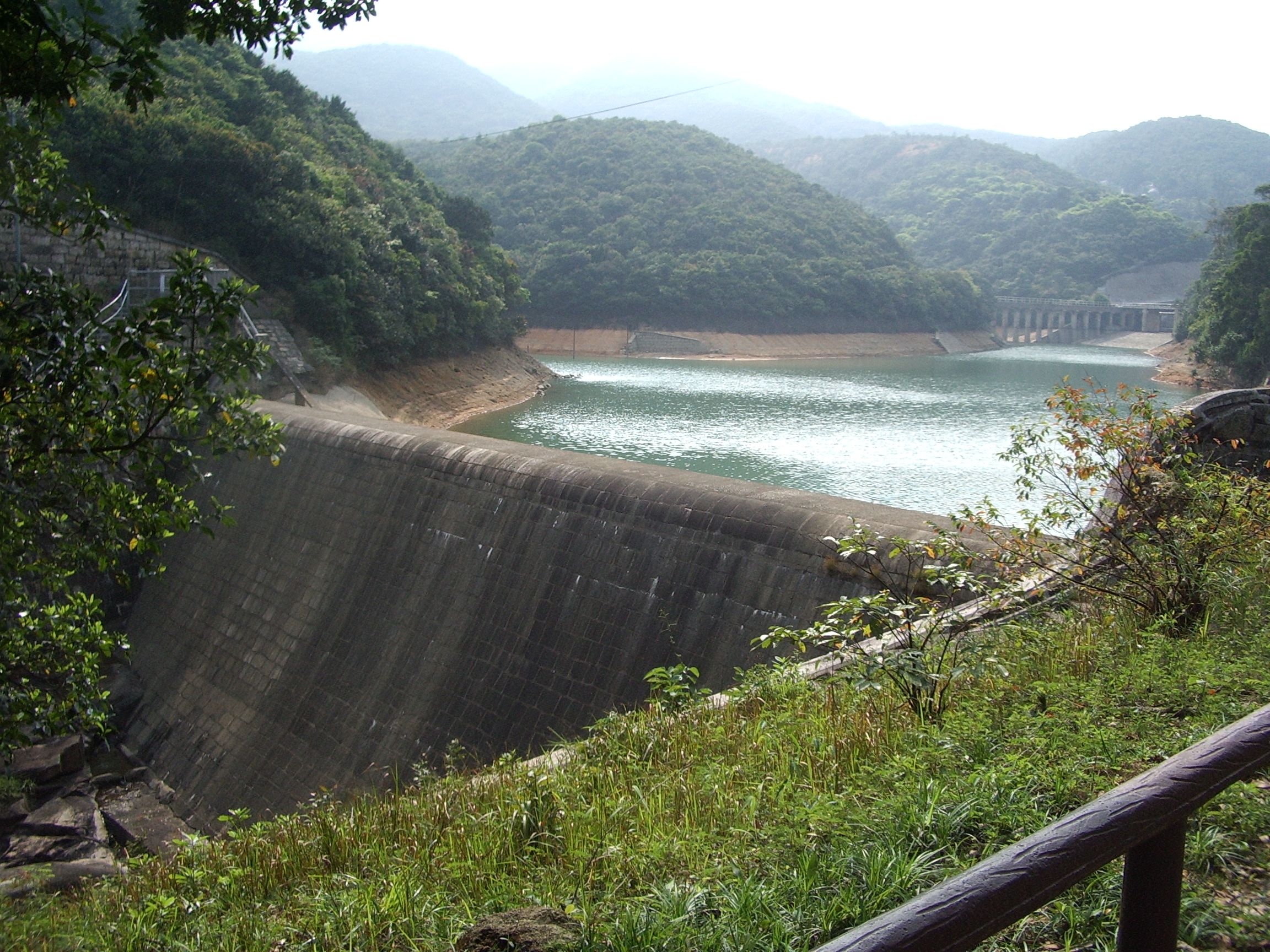
The dam of Tai Tam Byewash Reservoir in Tai Tam Country Park.

Tai Tam Country Park (Chinese: 大潭郊野公園; Jyutping: daai6 taam4 gaau1 je5 gung1 jyun4) is a country park in the Tai Tam area in the south end of Hong Kong Island. At 1,315 hectares (3,250 acres), the park consists of one fifth of Hong Kong Island's land mass. During World War II, the Japanese encountered strong resistance from British defence forces here. So that the park preserves bloody memories from that period.

The park was designated in 1977 with attractions like:

- Jardine's Lookout
- Tai Tam Upper Reservoir
- Tai Tam Byewash Reservoir
- Tai Tam Tuk Reservoir
- Tai Tam Intermediate Reservoir
- Tai Tam Forts
- Mount Parker, the second highest peak (531 m (1,742 ft)) on Hong Kong Island
- Mount Butler

Granite rocks in the north and volcanic rocks in the south form the geological composition of this area.

Another country park adjacent to it, named Tai Tam Country Park (Quarry Bay Extension), was designated in 1979.
