= Pok Fu Lam Reservoir =

Reservoir in Hong Kong

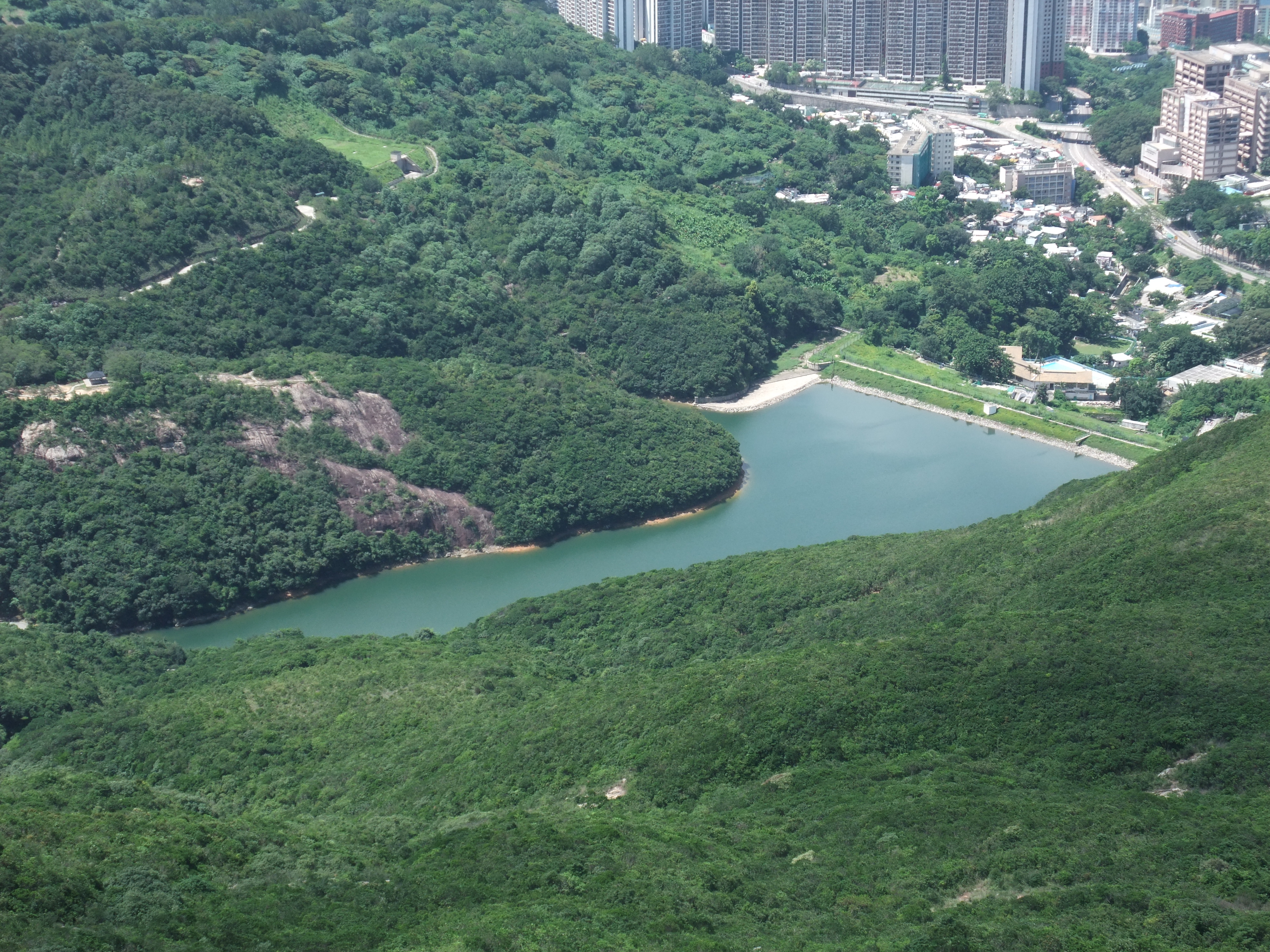
- Pok Fu Lam Reservoir, viewed from High West

- Location within Hong Kong
- Location: Hong Kong
- Coordinates: 22.26498°N 114.13727°E
- Type: reservoir
- Water volume: 260,000 m^{3} (210 acre⋅ft)

Pok Fu Lam Reservoir
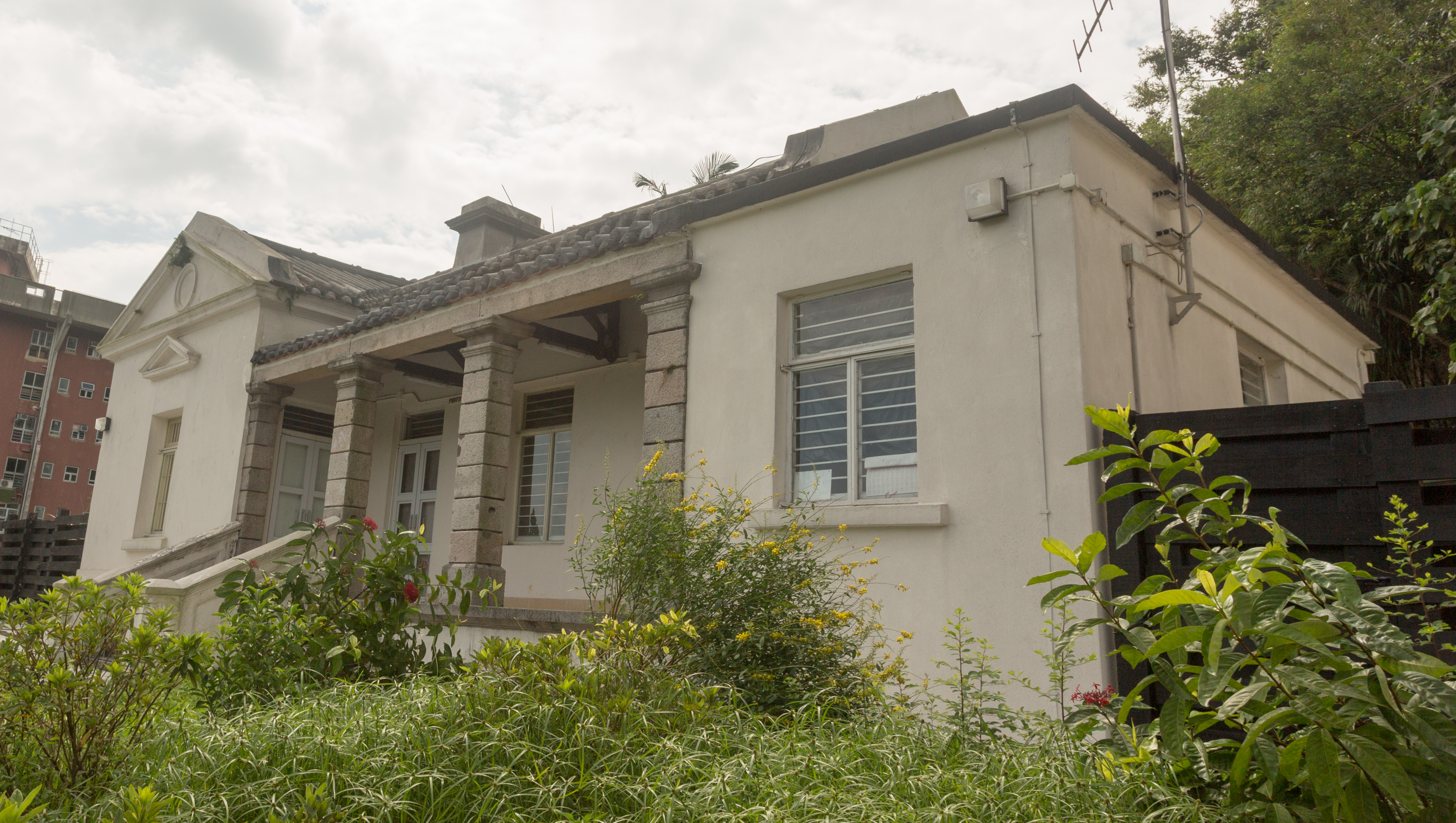
- Former Watchman's Cottage
- Chinese: 薄扶林水塘
- Jyutping: Bok6 fu4 lam4 seoi2 tong 4
Transcriptions
Standard Mandarin
- Hanyu Pinyin: Bófúlín Shuǐtáng
- Wade–Giles: Po-fu-lin Shui-tʻang
Yue: Cantonese
- Yale Romanization: Bohk fùh làhm séui tòhng
- Jyutping: Bok6 fu4 lam4 seoi2 tong 4

Pok Fu Lam Reservoir, formerly known as the Pokefulum Reservoir, is the first reservoir in Hong Kong. It is located in a valley in Pok Fu Lam, Hong Kong Island. It is near The Peak.It is actually two reservoirs with capacity of 260,000 m^{3}.

== History ==
Before the completion of the reservoir in 1863, the people in the city got their water by nearby streams or wells. These methods however were unable to support the rapid growth of the Hong Kong population since 1841. Due to diseases caused by polluted water, The Hong Kong Government needed an urgent solution to the problem. Thus, they offered a reward of 1,000 pounds to anyone who provided a solution to disease on 14 October 1859. The colonial government also allocated a budget of £25,000 for the project. On 29 February 1860, S. B. Rawling, a clerk from Royal Engineers suggested the construction of a dam across the valley of Pokfulam to collect rainwater. The reservoir was completed in 1863.

The construction did not meet the needs of the population because of budget-cuts, which left the dam to be far from adequate. Another reservoir above the original was built to meet the needs of the growing colony in 1877.

== Monument declaration ==
Six Historic Structures of Pok Fu Lam Reservoir were declared as monuments in 2009. These include four masonry bridges, gauge basin and the Former Watchman's Cottage which is now Pok Fu Lam Management Centre.
