= Wah Fu =

Area in Southern District, Hong Kong

Coordinates: 22.25043°N 114.13690°E

- Traditional Chinese: 華富
- Simplified Chinese: 华富
- Cantonese Yale: Wàhfu
Transcriptions
Yue: Cantonese
- Yale Romanization: Wàhfu
- Jyutping: Waa4fu3
- IPA: [wȁː.fūː]

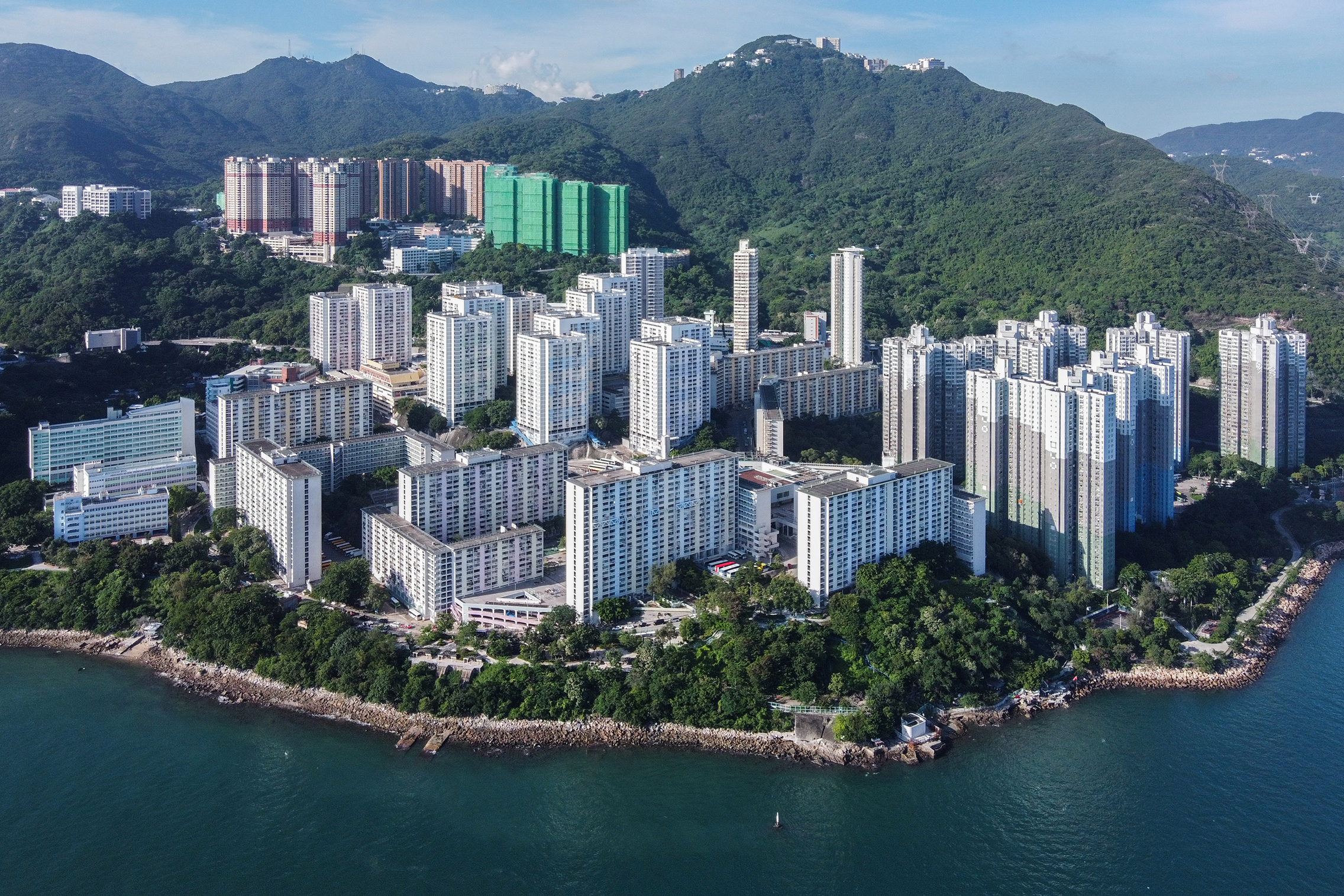

Wah Fu (Cantonese pronunciation: [wȁː fūː]) is an area located in Southern District, on Hong Kong Island, Hong Kong.

Wah Fu mainly consists of the public housing estates, Wah Fu Estate and Wah Kwai Estate. They were built near Waterfall Bay (瀑布灣) and Kellett Bay (雞籠灣).

The area also has a notable beach known as Waterfall Bay (瀑布灣). It is long believed that the waterfall at Waterfall Bay Park attracted British ships coming to Hong Kong to fetch fresh water after their long journey.

== Transport ==
Transport is primarily by bus and minibus. More than thirty bus routes pass through the area. Wah Fu station, of the proposed South Island line West Section of the MTR will be in Wah Fu.

== See also ==
- List of places in Hong Kong
- Pok Fu Lam
