= Tin Wan =

Area of Hong Kong

Coordinates: 22.2514°N 114.1498°E

- Traditional Chinese: 田灣
- Simplified Chinese: 田湾
Transcriptions
Standard Mandarin
- Hanyu Pinyin: Tiánwān
Yue: Cantonese
- Jyutping: tin4 waan1

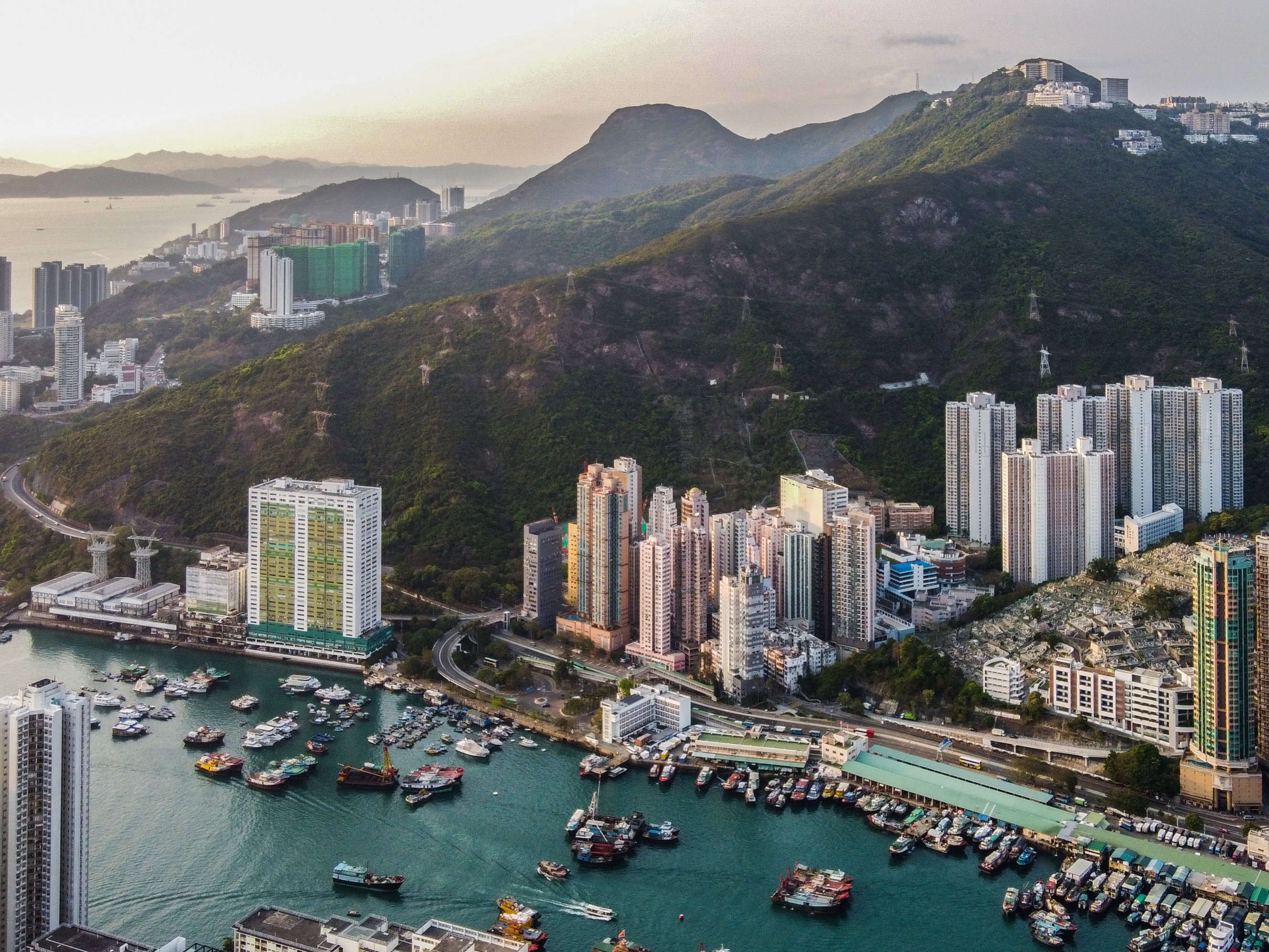
Tin Wan.

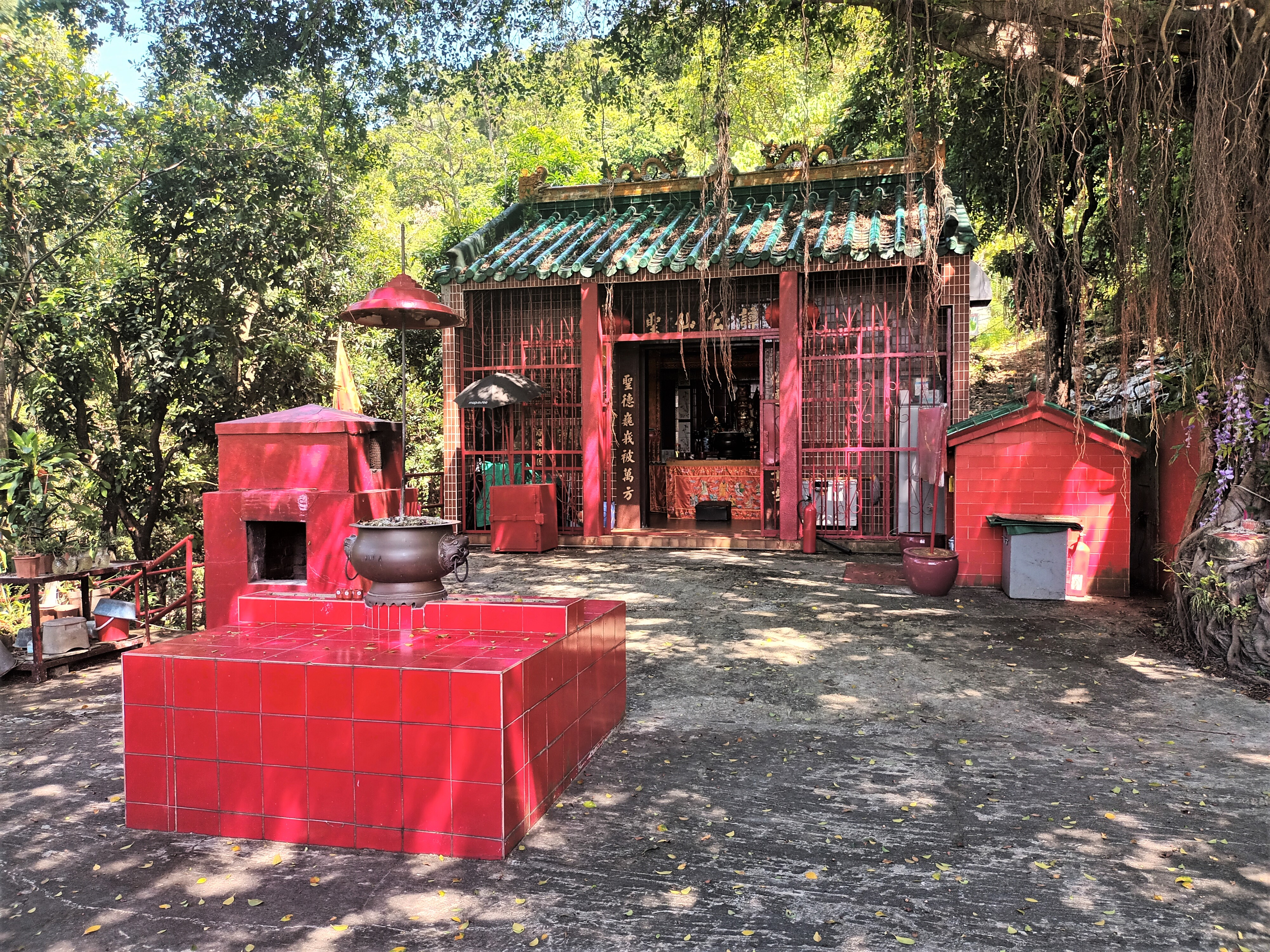
Tam Kung Yea Temple (香港仔譚公廟), off Shek Pai Wan Road, in Tin Wan.

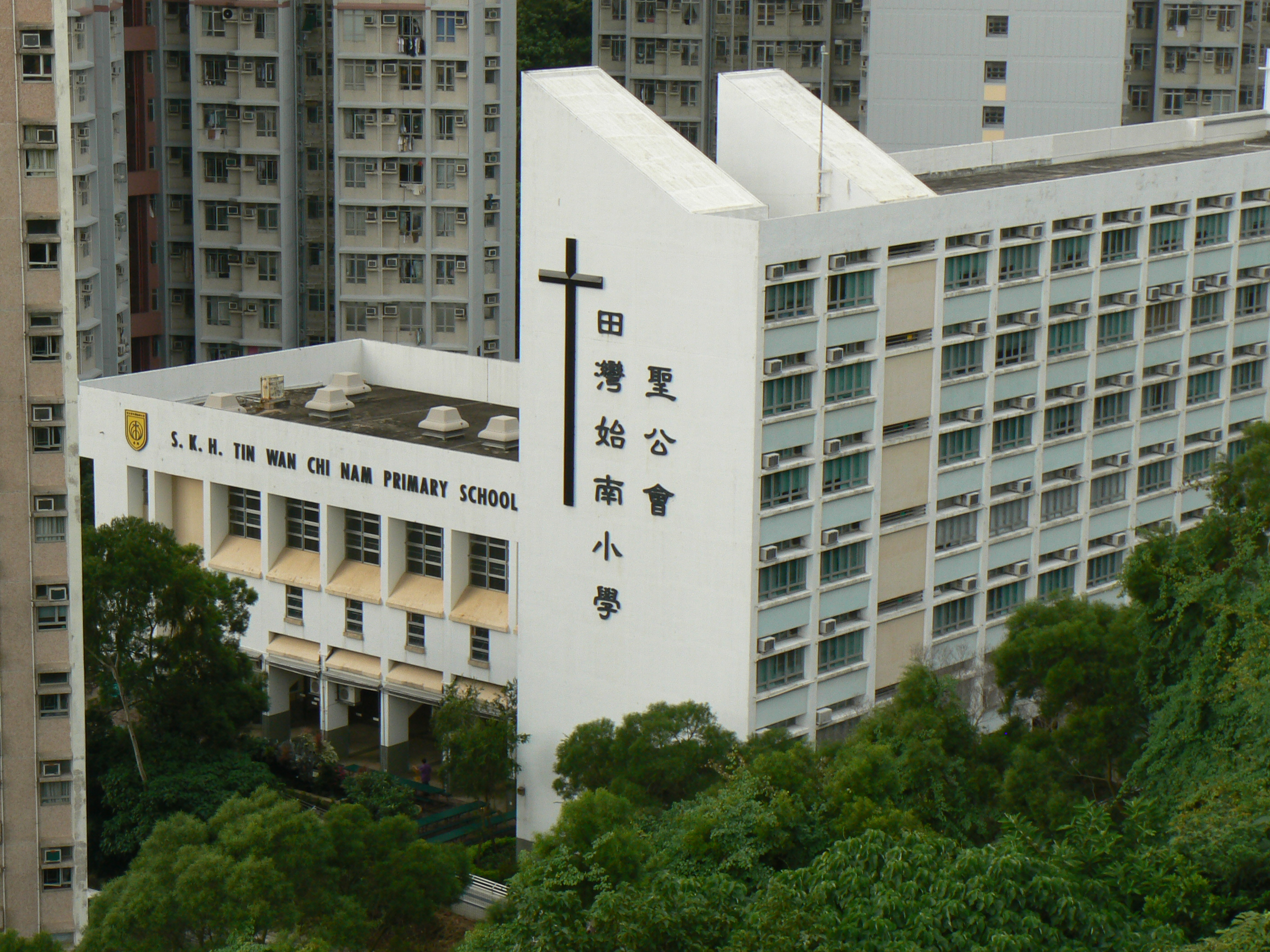
Tin Wan Chi Nam Primary School.

Tin Wan (Chinese: 田灣) is an area at the south of Hong Kong Island, Hong Kong. It is at the west of Aberdeen and the east of Kellett Bay and Wah Fu Estate.

== Housing ==
Tin Wan Estate is a public housing estate (田灣邨), also named after Tin Wan.

Hung Fuk Court is a housing estate built under the Home Ownership Scheme (or HOS), accommodating 1,946 people according to data provided by Centamap and Census and Statistic Department of Hong Kong.

== Population ==
At the time of the 1911 census, the population of Tin Wan was 111. The number of males was 67.

According to the Population Census in 2016, the population in Tin Wan is about 17,012.

== Points of interest ==
Ping Kee Restaurant, situated at Ka Wo Street, specialises in soup noodle dishes and is popular among residents of the area.

== Education ==
SKH Tin Wan Chi Nam Primary School is also situated in Tin Wan, surrounded by apartment buildings of Tin Wan Estate.

Tin Wan is in Primary One Admission (POA) School Net 18. Within the school net are multiple aided schools (operated independently but funded with government money) and Hong Kong Southern District Government Primary School.

== See also ==
- Tin Wan Shan
