= Miles Jackson-Lipkin =

M. H. Jackson-Lipkin (Li Pak-kim) 李栢儉
- Born: 24 May 1924; Liverpool, United Kingdom
- Died: 18 February 2012 (aged 87); London, United Kingdom
- Education: Harrow School; University of Liverpool; Trinity College; Middle Temple
- Occupations: Barrister, judge
- Spouse: Lucille Fung Yung-shim
- Children: 1
- Parent(s): I. J. Jackson-Lipkin; F. A. Patley

Miles Henry Jackson-Lipkin, GCLJ, QC, SC, JP (Chinese: 李栢儉, 24 May 1924 – 18 February 2012) was a British barrister-at-law based in Hong Kong, serving as a High Court judge between 1981 and 1987. In January 2007, he became the first former judge to be convicted and sentenced to prison in Hong Kong's history for social welfare fraud charges against him and his wife, Lucille Fung.

Jackson-Lipkin was admitted to the English bar in 1951. Since 1969, he had practised mainly in Hong Kong and had been involved in a number of famous court cases including the horse poisoning scandal of the Royal Hong Kong Jockey Club and the corruption charges against former police superintendent Ernest Hunt. He took silk in 1974 and was appointed a High Court judge in 1981. However, he was forced to resign from the High Court on health grounds when a news report revealed that he had falsified his date of birth, years of service in the Royal Navy and the retiring rank in his own biographical entry in the 1983 and 1984 editions of the International Who's Who. He continued to live in Hong Kong after the resignation.

Jackson-Lipkin successfully, applied for Comprehensive Social Security Assistance, the major social benefits scheme in Hong Kong, with his wife from the Social Welfare Department in September 2003, despite the fact that the couple possessed assets totalling at nearly 2 million HKD. The couple was further allotted, again, fraudulently, a public housing flat at Wah Fu Estate in the following year. Their fraud was exposed in February 2005 and they were arrested and charged by the police following in September.

The couple effectively postponed their trial repeatedly on various excuses such as health problems. And it was already October 2006 when their trial formally commenced. In January 2007, the couple was convicted on three criminal charges and was sentenced to eleven months in prison. In the court hearing on their appeal in May the same year, nevertheless, the presiding judge set them free at once on grounds of old age and their production of two appeal letters written by two senior judges from the United Kingdom. Their early release sparked much controversy and criticism.
