= Public housing estates in Pok Fu Lam, Aberdeen and Ap Lei Chau =

Public housing in Southern District, Hong Kong

The following shows the public housing estates (including Home Ownership Scheme (HOS), Private Sector Participation Scheme (PSPS), Tenants Purchase Scheme (TPS) and Sandwich Class Housing Scheme (SCHS)) in Pok Fu Lam, Aberdeen, Wong Chuk Hang and Ap Lei Chau of Southern District, Hong Kong.

== Overview ==
Name		Type	Inaug.	No Blocks	No Units	Notes
Ap Lei Chau Estate	鴨脷洲邨	Public	1980	8	4,453	
Broadview Court	雅濤閣	PSPS	2001	4	1,540	
Hung Fuk Court	鴻福苑	HOS	1997	2	700	
Marina Habitat	悅海華庭	Sandwich	1998	3	992	HK Housing Society
Ka Lung Court	嘉隆苑	HOS	1991	4	1,402	
Lei Tung Estate	利東邨	TPS	1987	8	3,363	
Ocean Court	逸港居	PSPS	2000	3	550	
Shek Pai Wan Estate	石排灣邨	Public	2006	4	2,877	
South Wave Court	南濤閣	PSPS	1995	3	1,040	
Tin Wan Estate	田灣邨	Public	1997	5	3,165	
Wah Fu (I) Estate	華富(一)邨	Public	1967	12	4,803	
Wah Fu (II) Estate	華富(二)邨	Public	1970	6	4,346	
Wah Kwai Estate	華貴邨	TPS	1990	6	1,413	
Yue Fai Court	漁暉苑	HOS	1980	6	1,320	
Yue Kwong Chuen	漁光村	Public	1965	5	1,175	HK Housing Society
Yue On Court	漁安苑	HOS	1988	7	1,960	

== Ap Lei Chau Estate ==
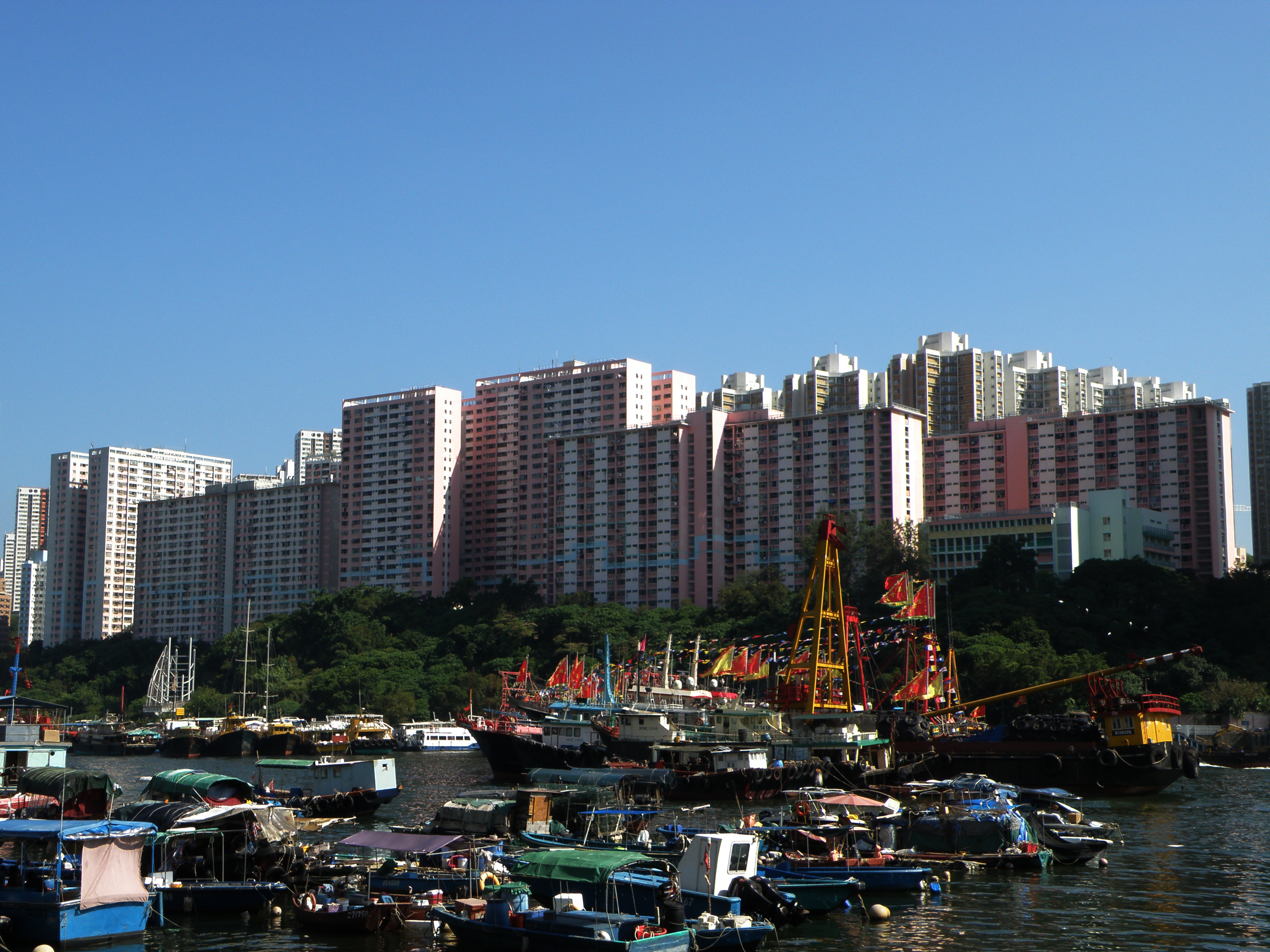
Ap Lei Chau Estate

Ap Lei Chau Estate (Chinese: 鴨脷洲邨) is a public estate in Ap Lei Chau. It is the first public housing estate in Ap Lei Chau. Completed in two phases in 1980 to 1982 respectively, the estate consists of 8 residential blocks providing 4,453 flats. It was one of the public housing estates built from 1980 to 1982 to accommodate people affected by a major fire in Aberdeen Typhoon Shelter.

=== Houses ===
Name	Type	Completion
Lei Ning House	Old Slab	1981
Lei Yee House	Old Slab	1981
Lei Tim House	Old Slab	1980
Lei Chak House	Triple H	1980
Lei Fook House	Double H	1982
Lei Moon House	Double H	1982

== Broadview Court ==
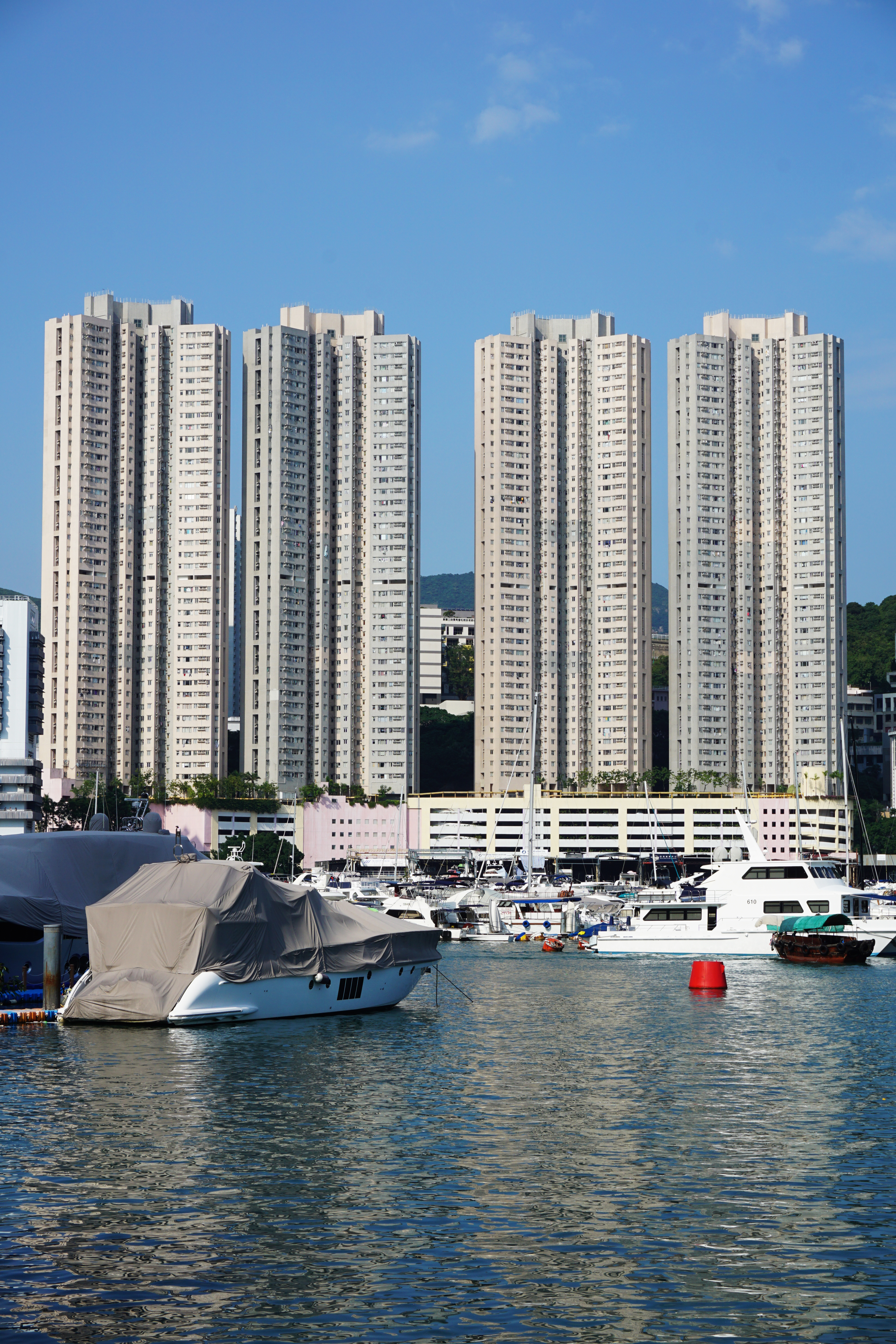
Broadview Court

Broadview Court (Chinese: 雅濤閣) is a HOS and PSPS court in Shum Wan Road, Wong Chuk Hang, next to the Aberdeen Marina Club and Ocean Park. Jointly developed by the Hong Kong Housing Authority and COSCO International, the court has a total of 4 blocks built in 2001. The entire housing estate is composed of four residential buildings, which are located on the Sham Wan Bus Terminal, a multi-storey car park and a retail platform. Two residential buildings with 38 floors and two 39 floors with fire barriers, a total of 1,540 Residential units. The units are divided into two-bedrooms and two-living rooms and three-bedrooms and two-living rooms. The building area is 505-707 square feet. Most of the units can enjoy sea views such as the deep bay and the marina.

=== Houses ===
Name	Type	Completion
Block 1	Private Sector Participation Scheme	2001
Block 2	Private Sector Participation Scheme	2001
Block 3	Private Sector Participation Scheme	2001
Block 4	Private Sector Participation Scheme	2001

=== Facilities nearby ===
- Aberdeen Marina Club
- Pao Yue Kong Swimming Pool
- Shum Wan Road Public Transport Terminus
- Marine Police Aberdeen Base

=== Landmarks nearby ===
- Ocean Park Hong Kong
- Marinella
- Larvotto

== Hung Fuk Court ==
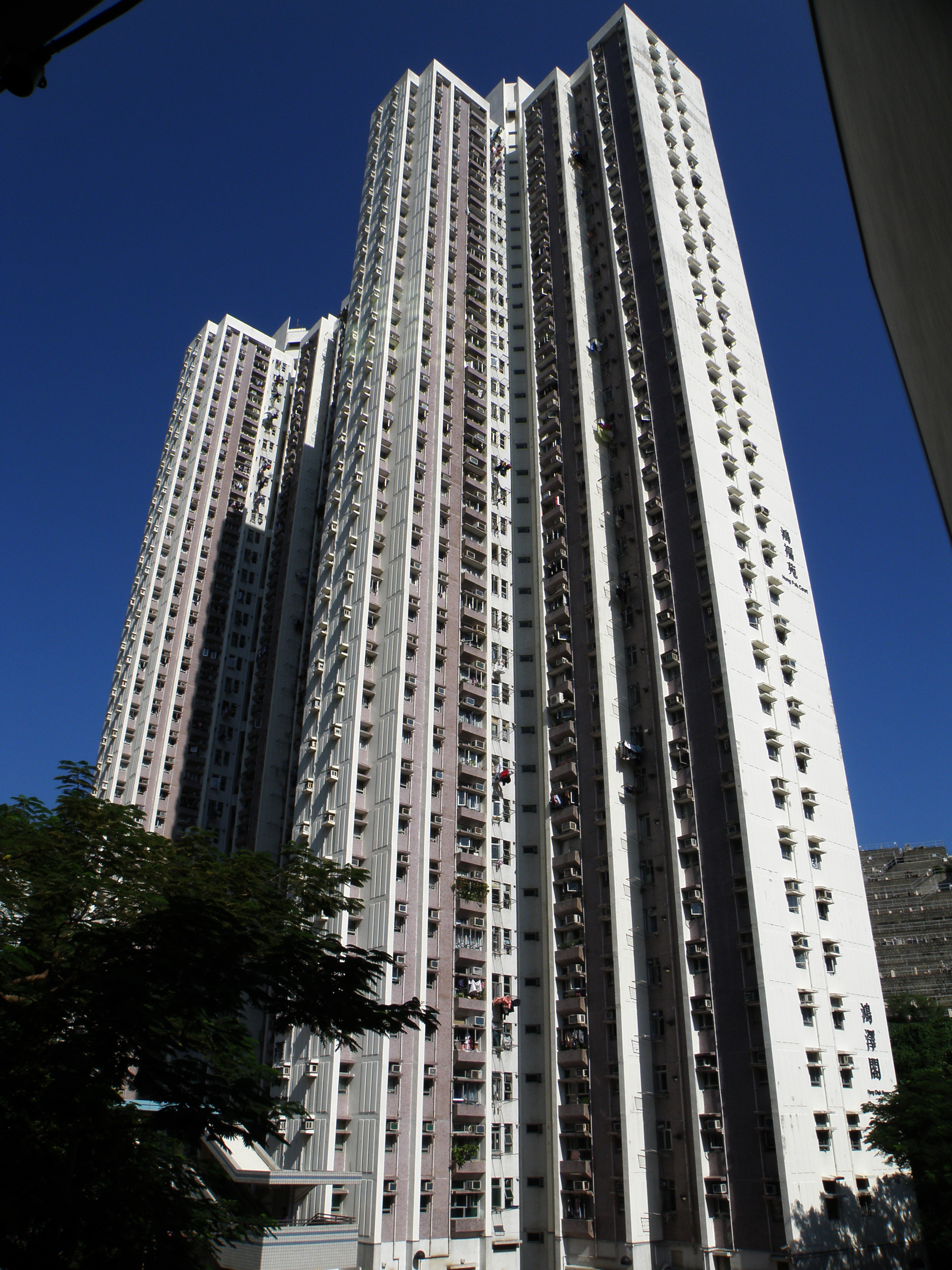
Hung Fuk Court

Hung Fuk Court (Chinese: 鴻福苑) is a HOS court in Tin Wan, Aberdeen, near Tin Wan Estate. It consists of 2 blocks completed in 1997.

=== Houses ===
Name	Type	Completion
Hung Lai House	NCB (Ver.1984)	1997
Hung Chak House	NCB (Ver.1984)	1997

== Ka Lung Court ==
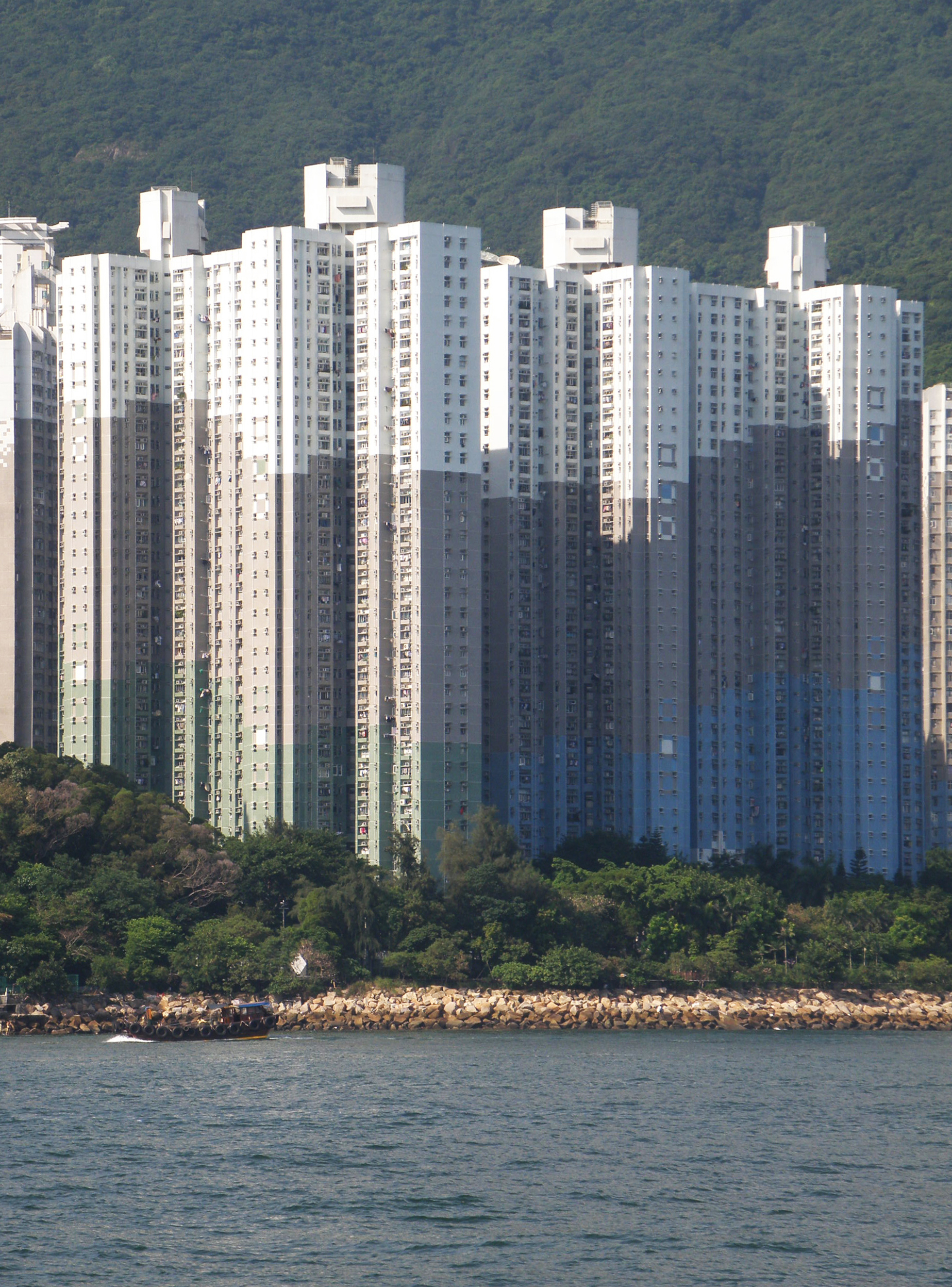
Ka Lung Court

Ka Lung Court (Chinese: 嘉隆苑) is a HOS court on the reclaimed land of Kellett Bay in Tin Wan Praya Road, Pok Fu Lam, next to Wah Kwai Estate. It comprises 4 blocks built in 1991.

Ka Lung Court is in Primary One Admission (POA) School Net 18. Within the school net are multiple aided schools (operated independently but funded with government money) and Hong Kong Southern District Government Primary School (香港南區官立小學).

=== Houses ===
Name	Type	Completion
Ka Sing House	NCB (Ver.1984)	1991
Ka Ping House	NCB (Ver.1984)	1991
Ka Chun House	NCB (Ver.1984)	1991
Ka Kit House	NCB (Ver.1984)	1991

== Lei Tung Estate ==
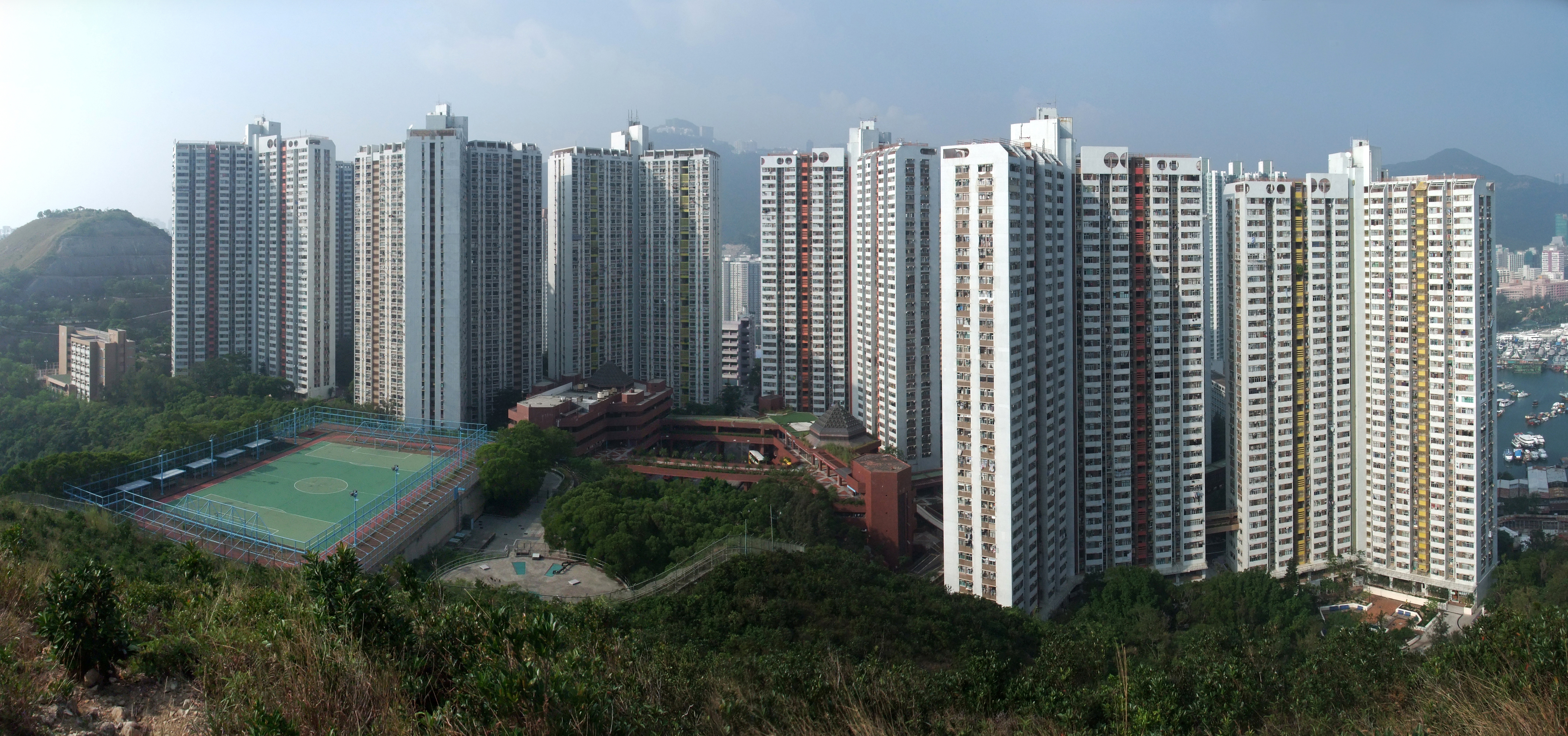
Lei Tung Estate

Lei Tung Estate (Chinese: 利東邨) is a mixed public and Tenants Purchase Scheme (TPS) estate in Ap Lei Chau near Lei Tung station. Built at a hill called Yuk Kwai Shan, it is the second public housing estate in Ap Lei Chau. It is developed into a self-contained community with various kinds of recreational and commercial facilities. It consists of 8 residential blocks with 2 blocks of Trident I type and 6 blocks of Trident II type, built between 1987 and 1988 with a total of about 7,500 units. In 2004, some of the flats were sold to tenants through Tenants Purchase Scheme Phase 6A.

=== Houses ===
Name	Type	Completion
Tung Mau House	Trident I	1987
Tung Hing House	Trident I	1987
Tung Cheong House	Trident II	1987
Tung Yip House	Trident II	1987
Tung Ping House	Trident II	1987
Tung Sing House	Trident II	1988
Tung On House	Trident II	1988
Tung Yat House	Trident II	1988

== Marina Habitat ==
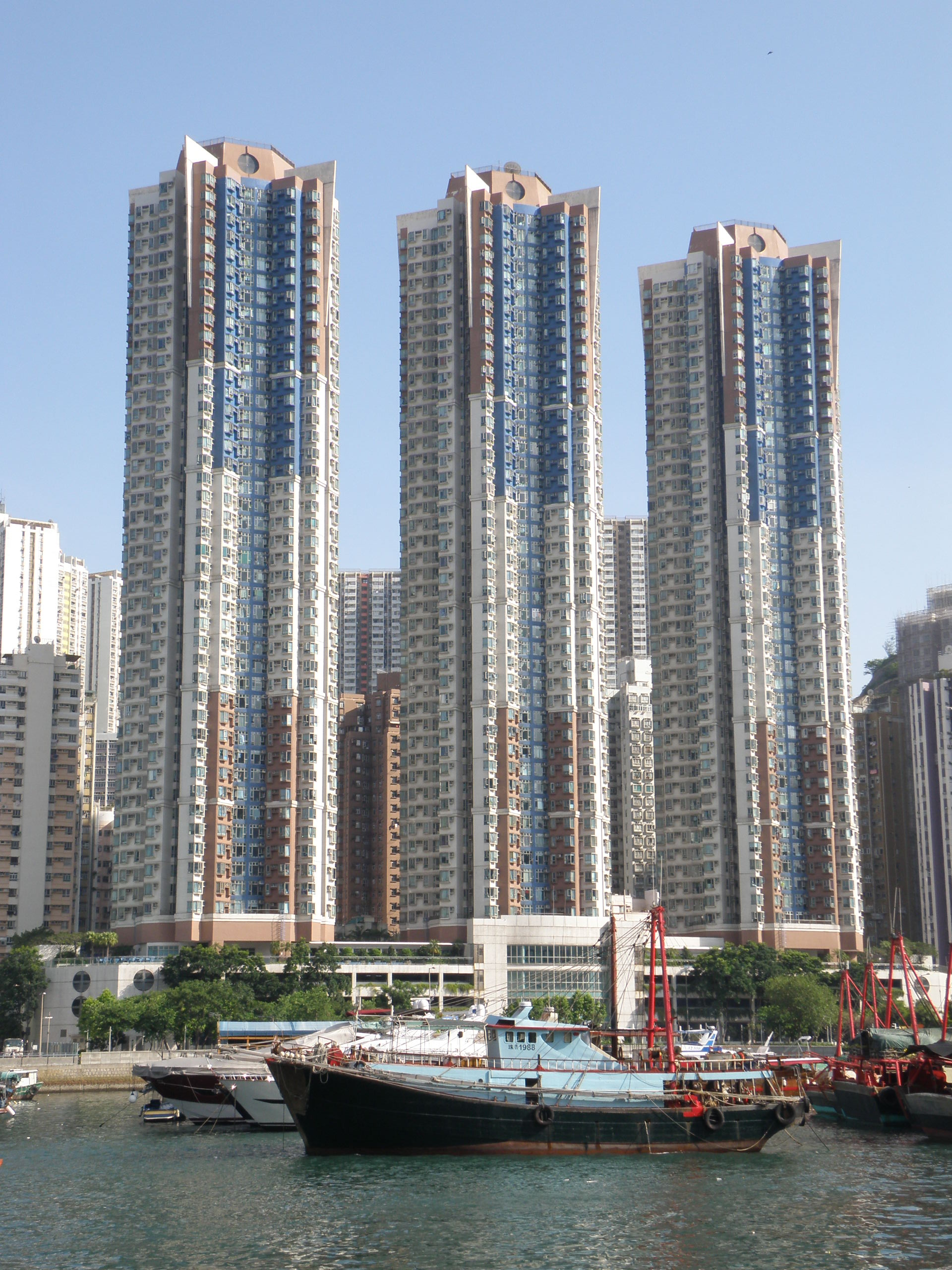
Marina Habitat

Marina Habitat (Chinese: 悅海華庭) is a Sandwich Class Housing Scheme court in Ap Lei Chau developed by the Hong Kong Housing Society, built on the reclaimed land outside Ap Lei Chau Main Street on the waterfront of Ap Lei Chau. It consists of 3 residential towers on top of a 3-storey podium.

=== Houses ===
Name	Type	Completion
Block 1	Sandwich Class Housing Scheme	1998
Block 2	Sandwich Class Housing Scheme	1998
Block 3	Sandwich Class Housing Scheme	1998

== Ocean Court ==
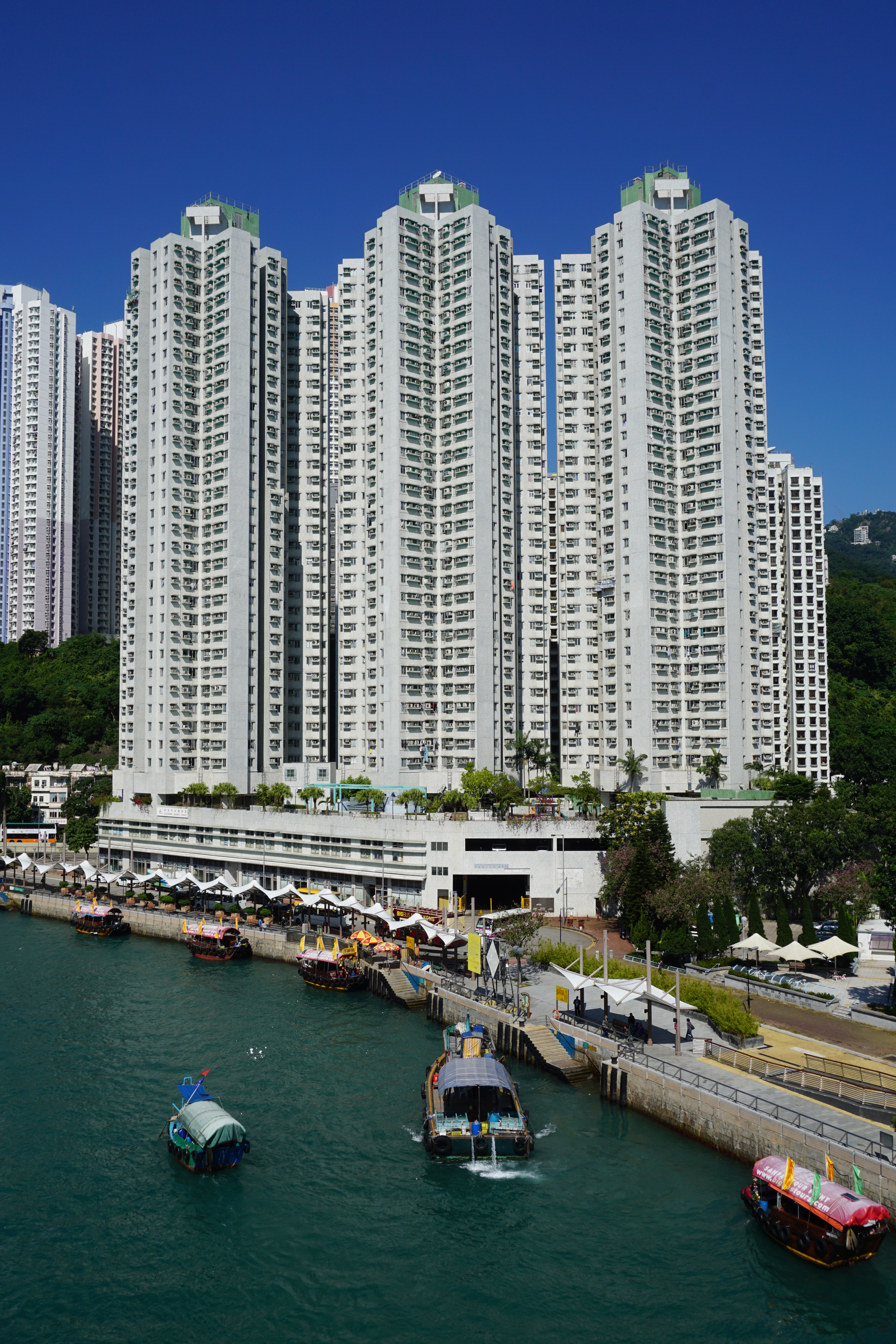
Ocean Court

Ocean Court (Chinese: 逸港居) is a HOS and PSPS court on the reclaimed land in Aberdeen, located on the waterfront of Aberdeen Praya Road. The residential development was built in 2000, and it comprises three 31-storey residential towers providing 550 domestic units.

=== Houses ===
Name	Type	Completion
Block 1	Private Sector Participation Scheme	2000
Block 2	Private Sector Participation Scheme	2000
Block 3	Private Sector Participation Scheme	2000

== Shek Pai Wan Estate ==
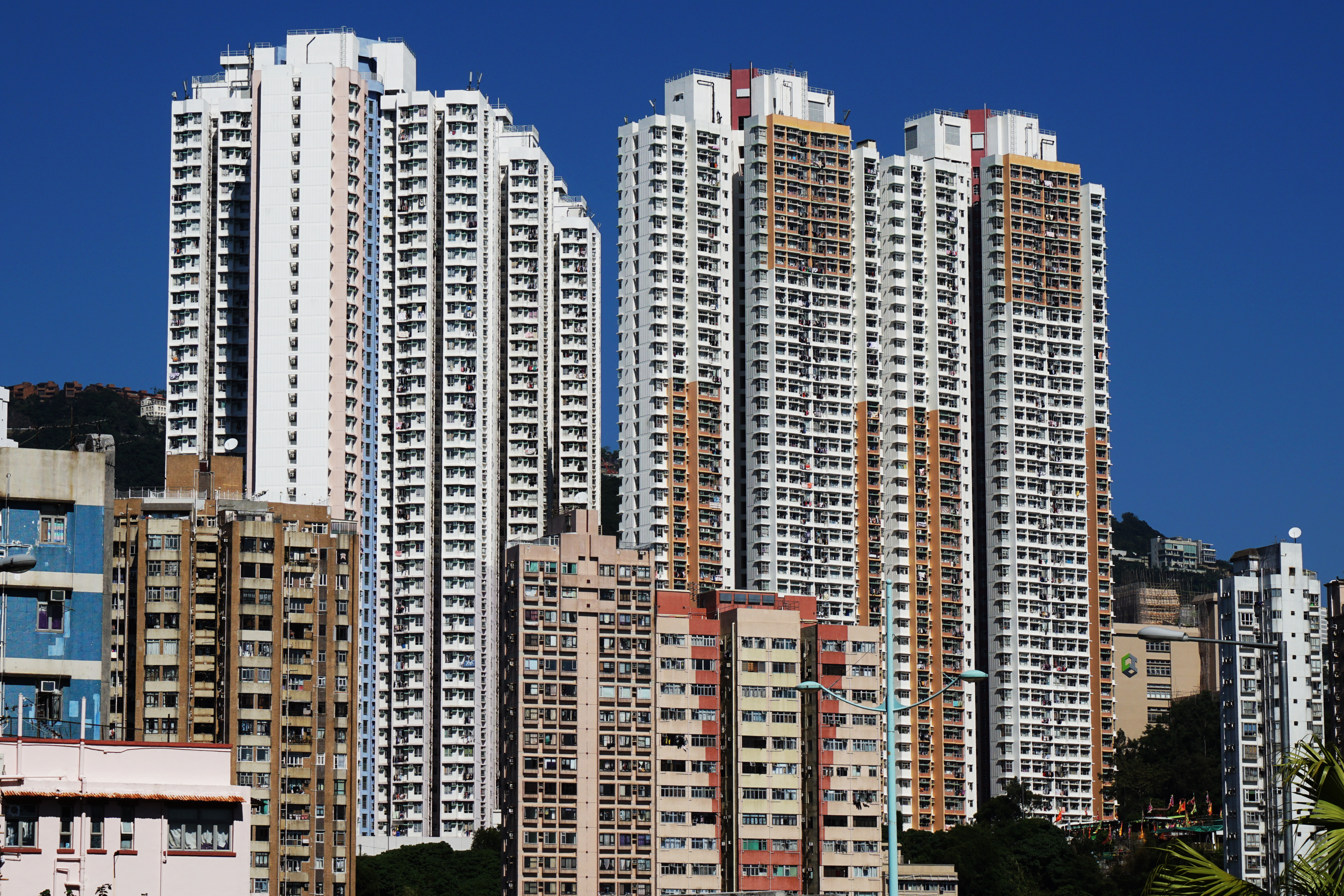
Shek Pai Wan Estate

Shek Pai Wan Estate (Chinese: 石排灣邨) is a public estate in Shek Pai Wan, the hillside at the east of Aberdeen, Hong Kong. It comprises 7 residential blocks, a non-standard small household block, a primary school, a shopping centre and a bus terminus.

== South Wave Court ==
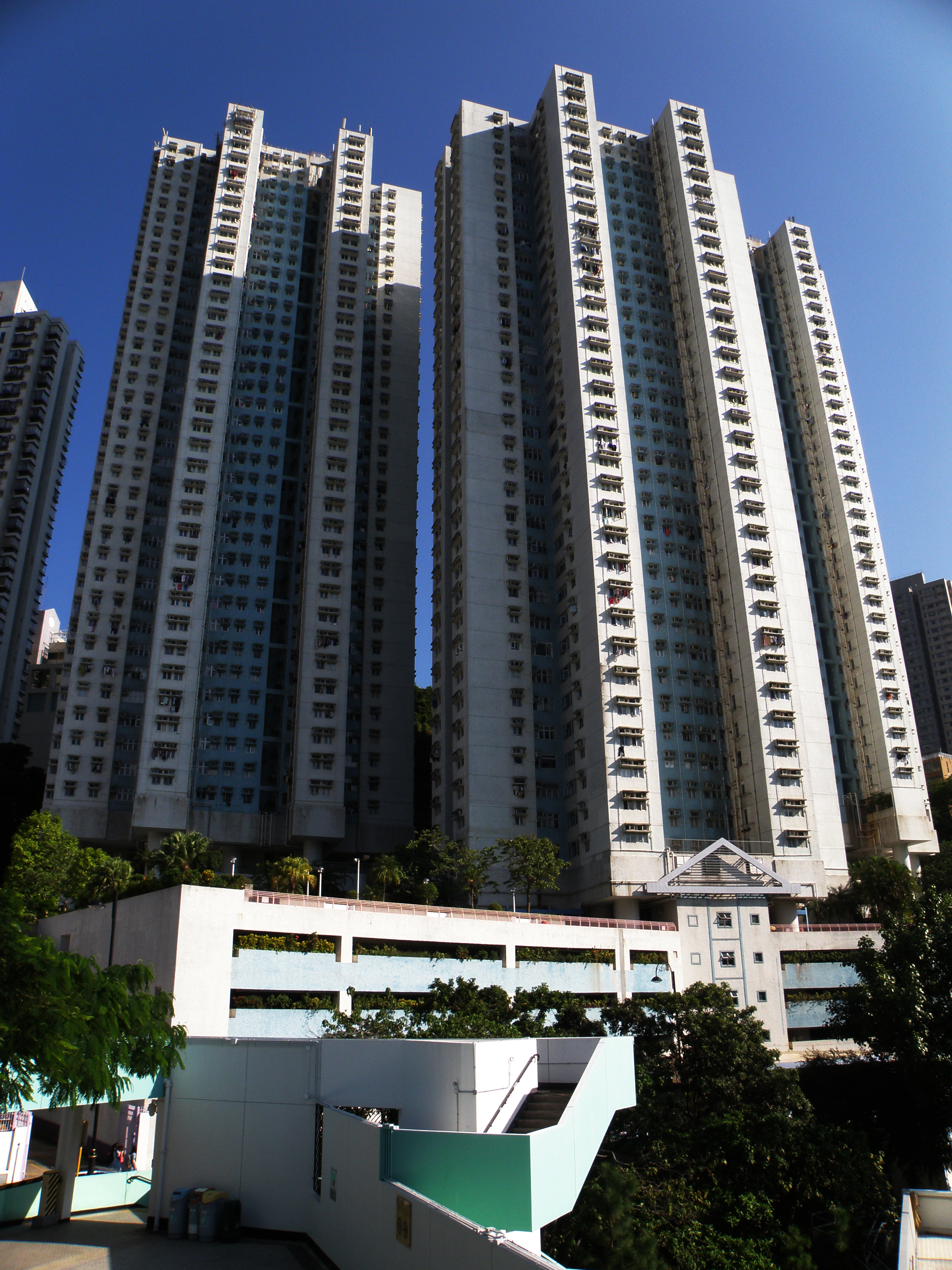
South Wave Court

South Wave Court (Chinese: 南濤閣) is a HOS and PSPS court beside Nam Long Shan in Wong Chuk Hang, near Sham Wan and Aberdeen Marina Club. It has 3 blocks built in 1995.

=== Houses ===
Name	Type	Completion
Block 1	Private Sector Participation Scheme	1995
Block 2	Private Sector Participation Scheme	1995
Block 3	Private Sector Participation Scheme	1995

== Tin Wan Estate ==
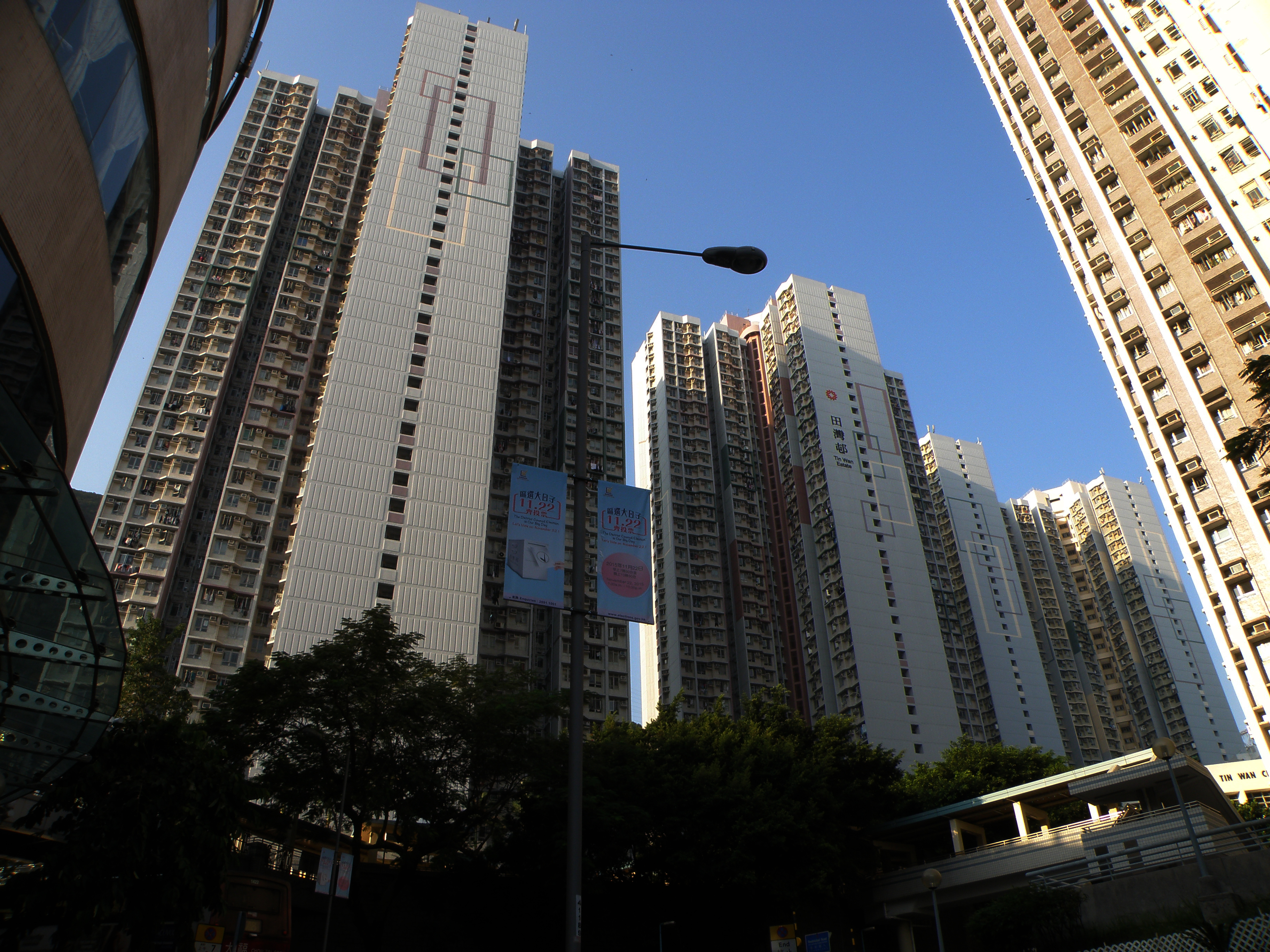
Tin Hong, Tin Kin, Tin Chak and Tin Lai House (from left to right)

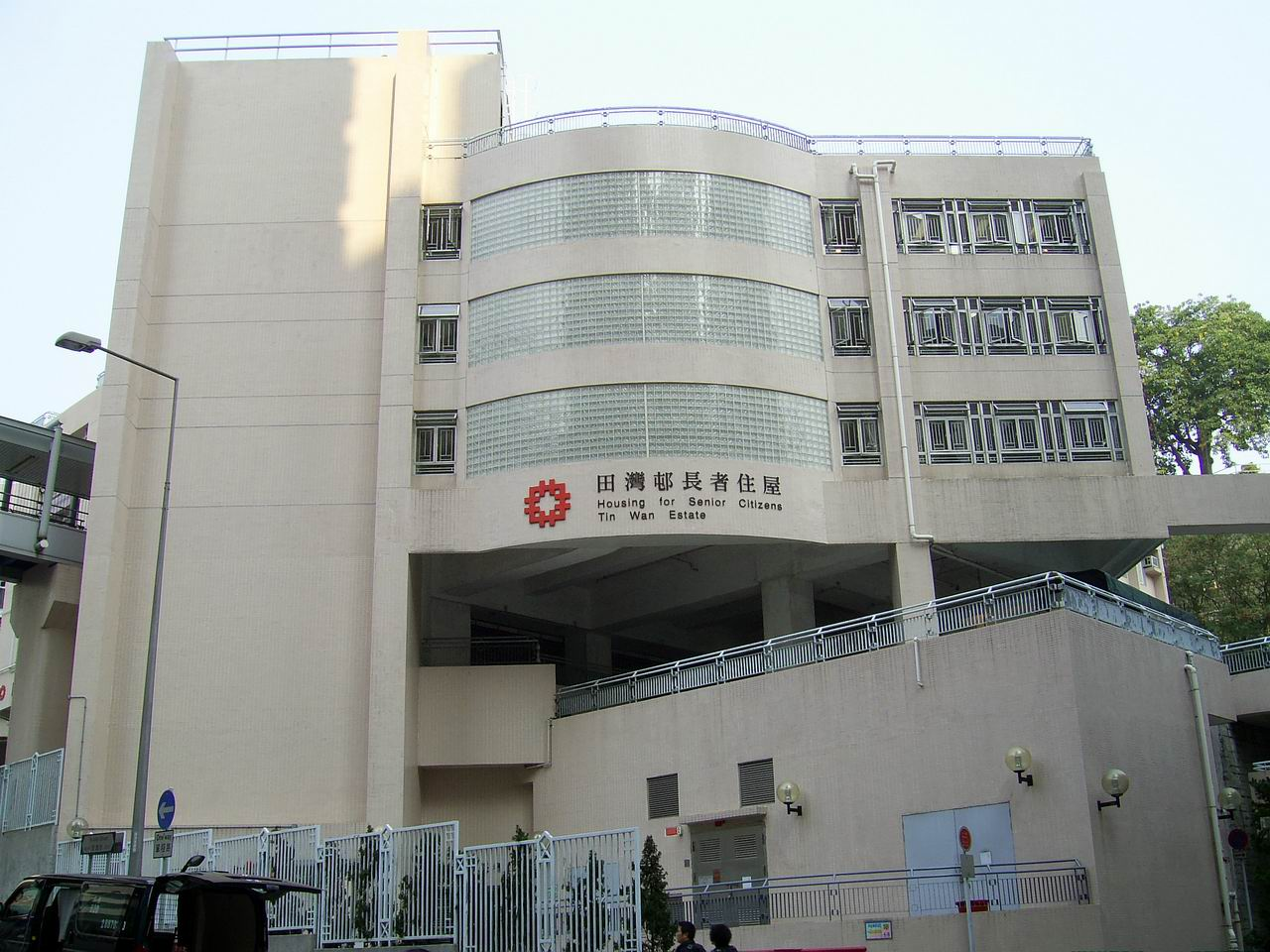
Housing For Senior Citizens

Tin Wan Estate (Chinese: 田灣邨) is a public estate in Tin Wan, to the west of Aberdeen.

=== Background ===
Tin Wan Estate was a resettlement estate which had a total of 15 blocks built between 1962 and 1965. The blocks were demolished in 1992 and replaced by 5 residential buildings in 1997.

=== Houses ===
Name	Type	Completion
Tin Chak House	Harmony 1	1997
Tin Hong House	Harmony 1	1997
Tin Kin House	Harmony 1	1997
Tin Lai House	Harmony 1	1997
Housing For Senior Citizens	Non-standard	1997

== Wah Fu Estate ==
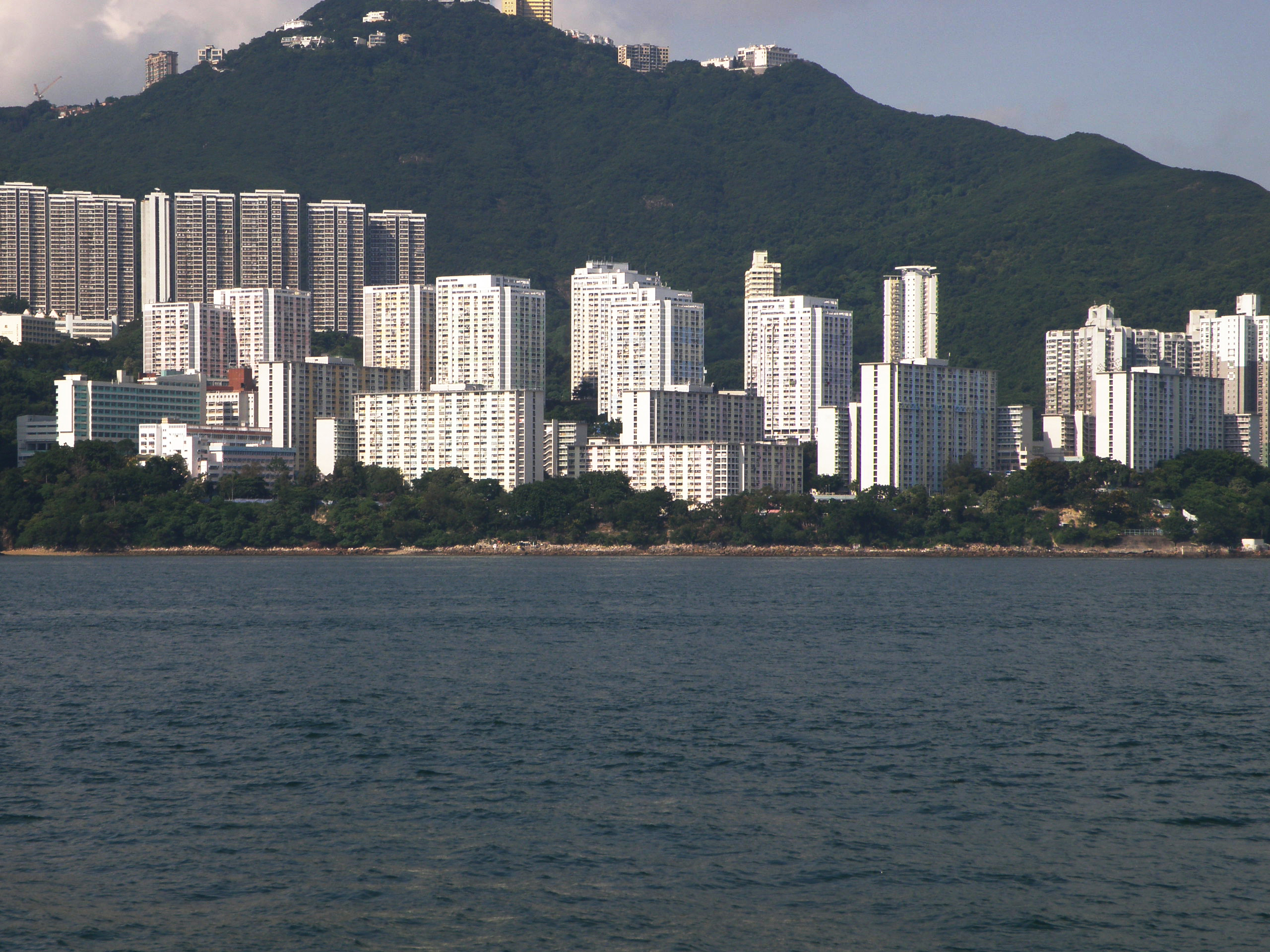
Wah Fu Estate

Wah Fu Estate (Chinese: 華富邨) is a public estate located by the Kellett Bay, Pok Fu Lam. Divided into Wah Fu (I) Estate (Chinese: 華富(一)邨) and Wah Fu (II) Estate (Chinese: 華富(二)邨), the whole estate has a total of 18 residential blocks completed between 1967 and 1978.

== Wah Kwai Estate ==
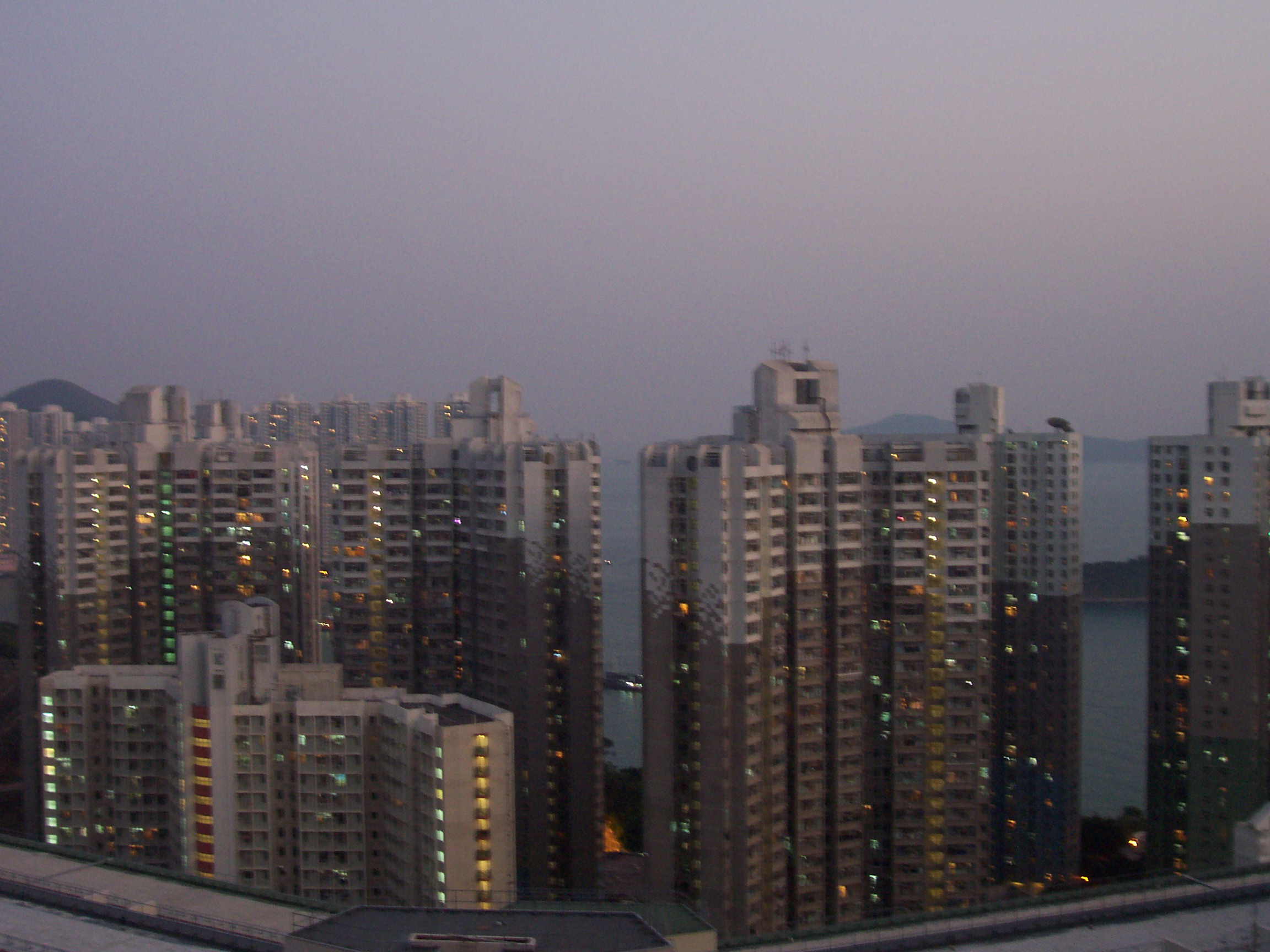
Wah Kwai Estate

Wah Kwai Estate (Chinese: 華貴邨) is a mixed public and TPS estate on the reclaimed land of Kellett Bay, Pok Fu Lam, located near Wah Fu Estate. The estate consists of 6 residential buildings built in 1990 and 1991. In 1998, some of the flats were sold to tenants through Tenants Purchase Scheme Phase 1.

Wah Kwai Estate is in Primary One Admission (POA) School Net 18. Within the school net are multiple aided schools (operated independently but funded with government money) and Hong Kong Southern District Government Primary School (香港南區官立小學).

=== Houses ===
Name	Type	Completion
Wah Hau House	Trident 4	1990
Wah Lim House	Trident 4	1990
Wah Lai House	Trident 4	1990
Wah Sin House	Trident 4	1990
Wah Yin House	Trident 4	1990
Wah Oi House	Small Household Block	1997

== Yue Fai Court ==
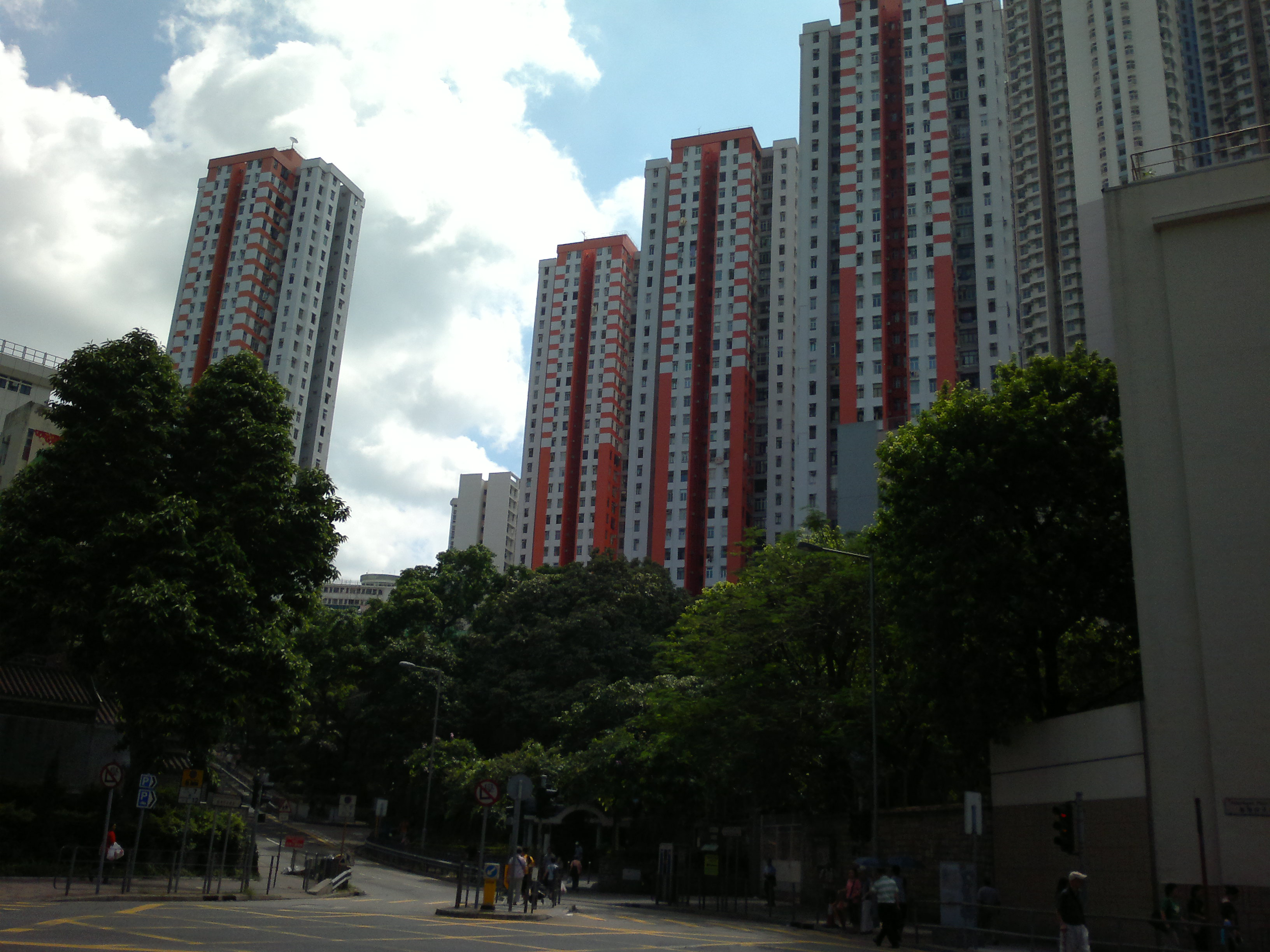
Yue Fai Court

Yue Fai Court (Chinese: 漁暉苑) is a Home Ownership Scheme court in Shek Pai Wan, Aberdeen, near Shek Pai Wan Estate and Yue Kwong Chuen. It consists of 6 blocks completed in 1980, and it was one of the earliest HOS courts in Hong Kong.

=== Houses ===
Name	Type	Completion
Yuk Fai House	Non-Standard	1980
Yat Fai House	Non-Standard	1980
Mei Fai House	Non-Standard	1980
On Fai House	Non-Standard	1980
King Fai House	Non-Standard	1980
Tin Fai House	Non-Standard	1980

== Yue Kwong Chuen ==
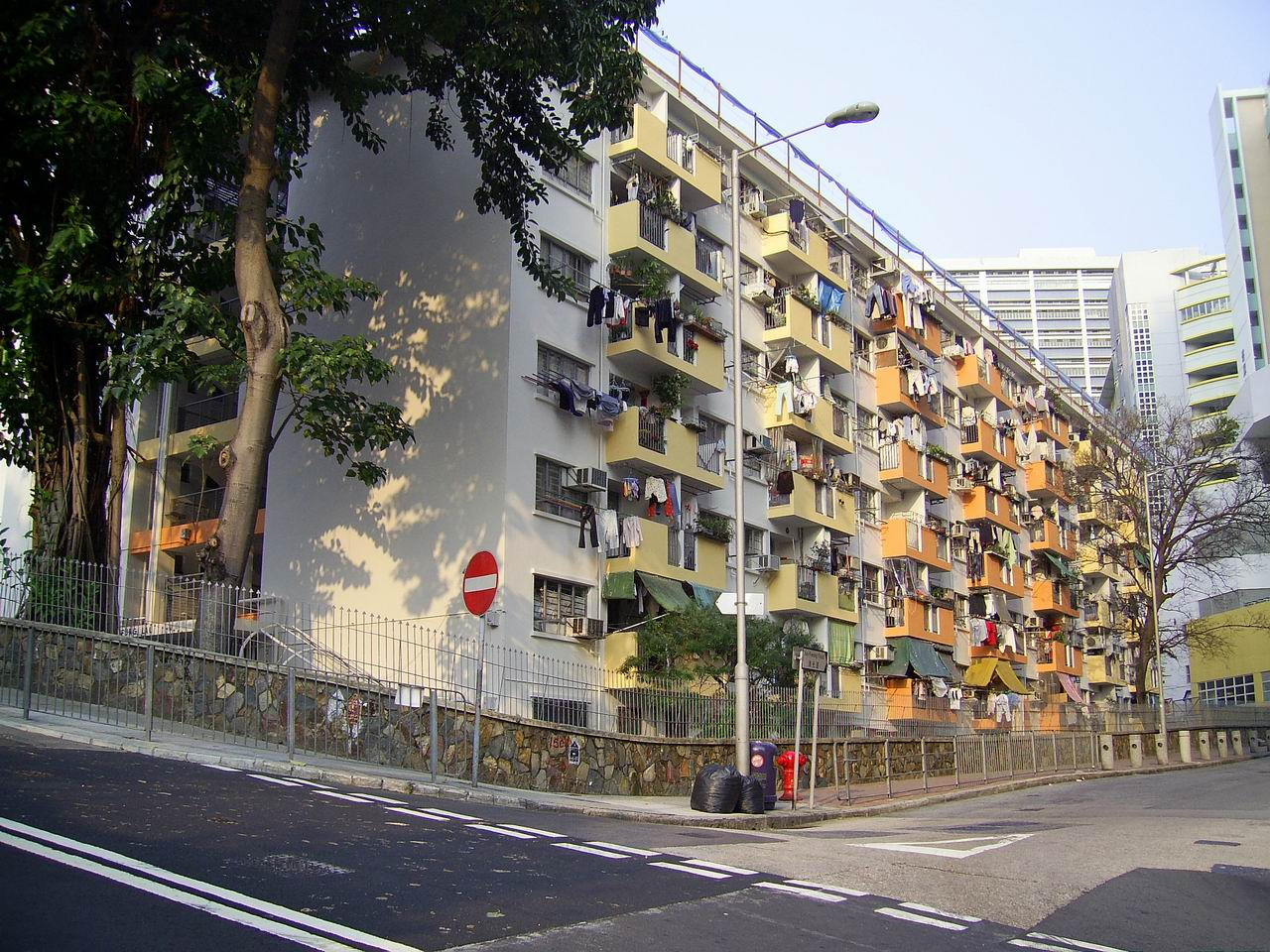
Shun Fung Lau of Yue Kwong Chuen

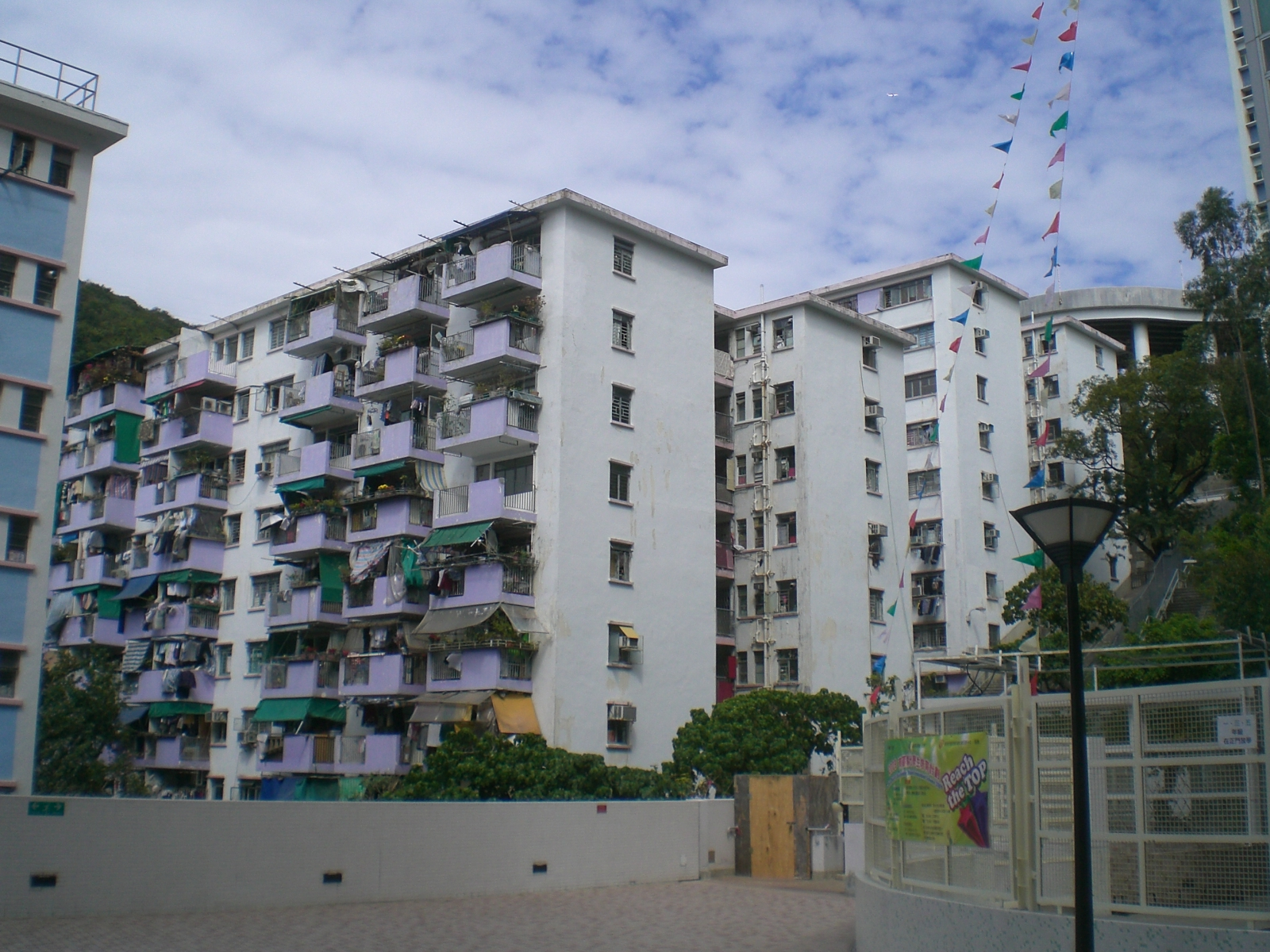
Hoy Kong Lau of Yue Kwong Chuen

Yue Kwong Chuen (Chinese: 漁光村) is a public estate in Aberdeen, developed by the HKHS, and it is the only estate in Southern District developed by the Hong Kong Housing Society.

The estate comprises 5 blocks built in 1962, 1963 and 1965 respectively. It is the second oldest existing public housing estate developed by the Hong Kong Housing Society (the first one is Ming Wah Dai Ha), and also the oldest one in Southern District.

=== Houses ===
Name	Completion
Shun Fung Lau	1962–1963
Pak Sha Lau	1962–1963
Hoy Kong Lau	1962–1963
Ching Hoy Lau	1965
Hoy Au Lau	1965

== Yue On Court ==
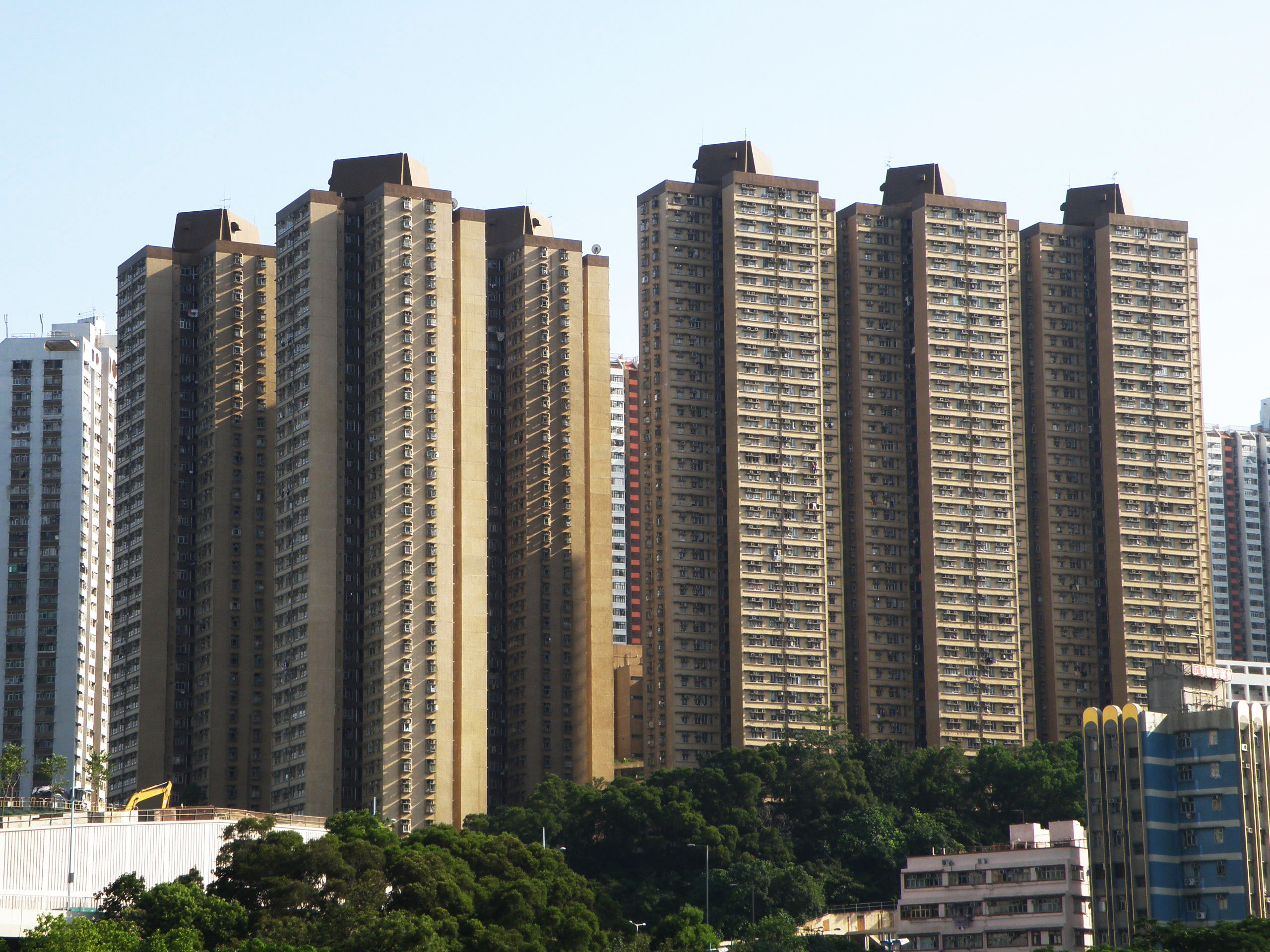
Yue On Court

Yue On Court (Chinese: 漁安苑) is a HOS court in Ap Lei Chau, near Aberdeen South Typhoon Shelter, Lei Tung Estate and Lei Tung station. It comprises 7 Flexi blocks of 35 storeys.

=== Houses ===
Name	Type	Completion
Ngan On House	Flexi 3	1988
Choi On House	Flexi 3	1988
Pik On House	Flexi 3	1988
Tse On House	Flexi 3	1988
Har On House	Flexi 3	1988
Shan On House	Flexi 3	1988
Wu On House	Flexi 3	1988
