= Tin Wan Shan =

Hill in Hong Kong

- 田灣山
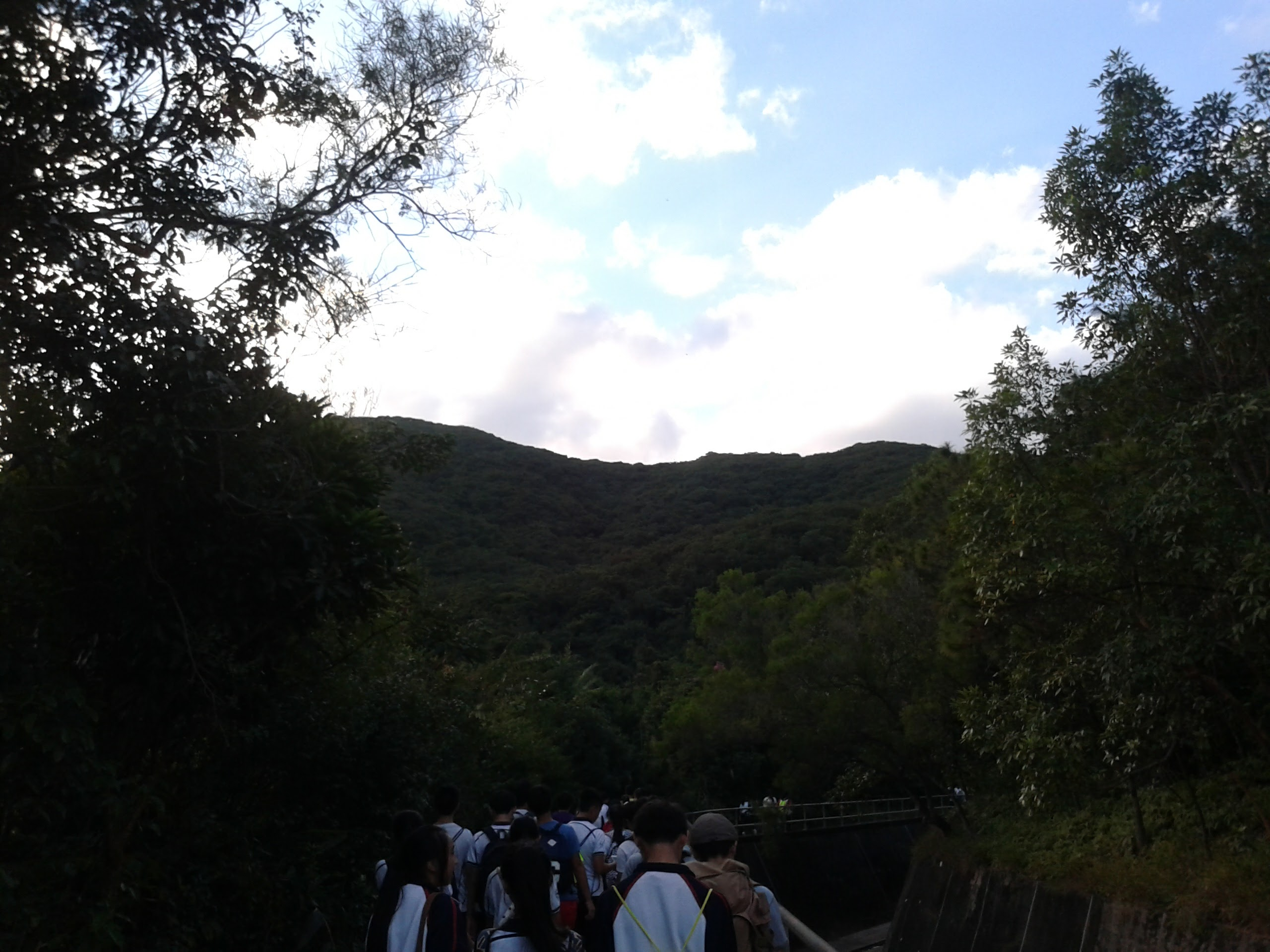
- Tin Wan Shan

Highest point
- Elevation: 252 m (827 ft)
- Coordinates: 22°15′28″N 114°09′30″E

Geography
- Location within Hong Kong
- Location: Hong Kong

Tin Wan Shan (Chinese: 田灣山) is a hill in southern Hong Kong.

== Geography ==
Tin Wan Shan is 252 metres (827 ft) in height and is north of the area of Tin Wan. The entire mountain is located inside Aberdeen Country Park.

== See also ==
- List of mountains, peaks and hills in Hong Kong
