= Aberdeen Country Park =

Country park in Aberdeen, Hong Kong

Coordinates: 22.25625°N 114.16061°E

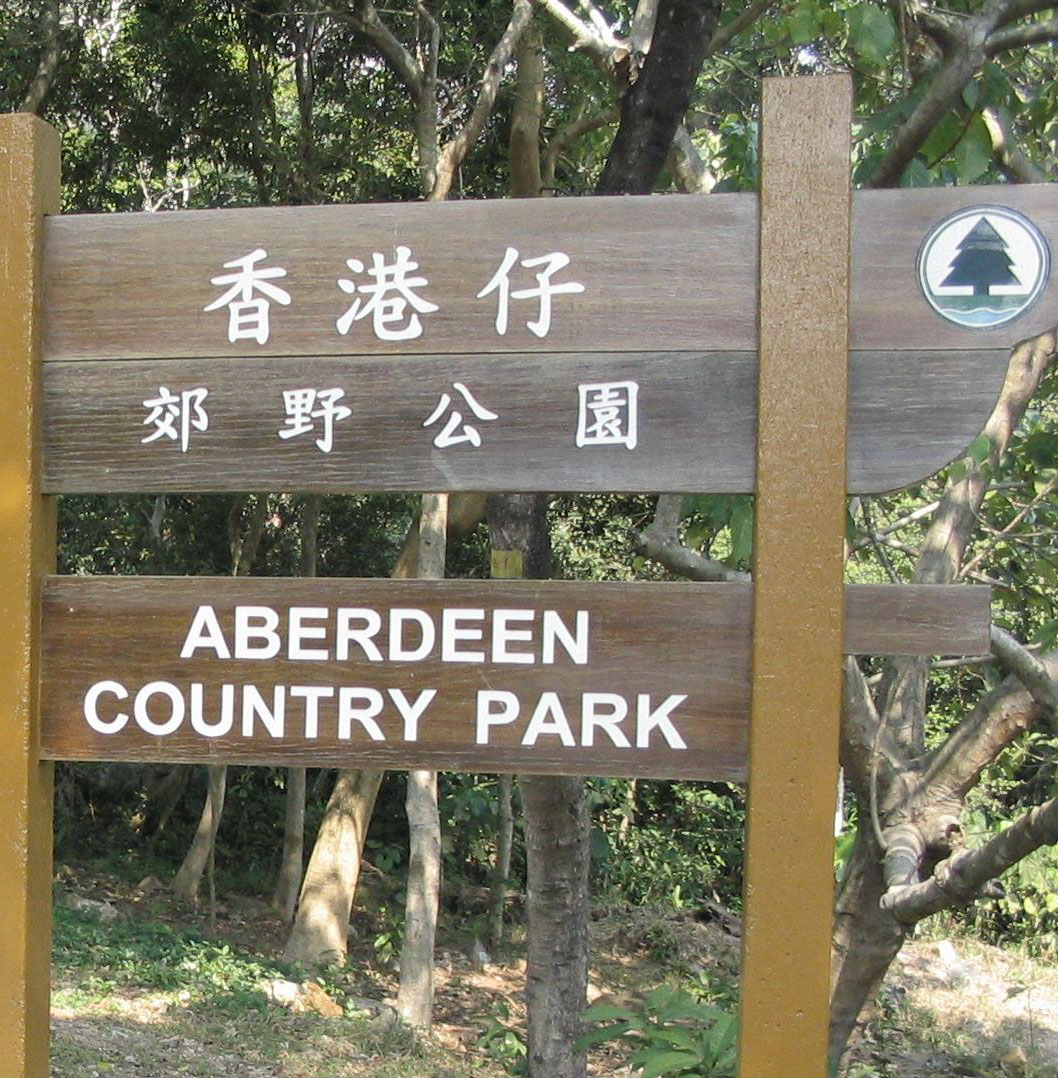
- Entrance sign
- Interactive map of Aberdeen Country Park
- Type: Country park
- Location: Aberdeen, Hong Kong
- Area: 423 hectares (1,050 acres)
- Designated: 28 October 1977; 48 years ago
- Manager: Agriculture, Fisheries and Conservation Department

Aberdeen Country Park
- Traditional Chinese: 香港仔郊野公園
- Cantonese Yale: hēung góng jái gāau yéh gūng yún
Transcriptions
Yue: Cantonese
- Yale Romanization: hēung góng jái gāau yéh gūng yún
- Jyutping: hoeng1 gong2 zai2 gaau1 je5 gung1 jyun4

Aberdeen Country Park is located on the south end of Hong Kong Island near the area called Aberdeen, Hong Kong. Much of the south side of the island is underdeveloped and retains more of the rural feel that predominated on the island before it was settled by the British. The park extends to Wan Chai Gap on the north.

The 4.23 square kilometre country park opened in 1931. Like other country parks of Hong Kong, Aberdeen is based on land surrounding reservoirs, in this case the Upper and Lower Reservoirs. The reservoirs were completed in 1932. Designated on 28 October 1977, Aberdeen Country Park is one of the oldest country parks in Hong Kong. The scenery of the park can be appreciated from Peak Road and Guildford Road.

== Geology ==
This is essentially an area of volcanic rocks of the Repulse Bay Formation formed during the Lower and Middle Jurassic Period.

== Vegetation ==
As in Tai Tam Country Park, most of the trees in the Aberdeen Country Park area suffered ravages during the Second World War and the Japanese occupation. The now well-shaded woods are mainly the result of post war re-afforestation as well as natural regeneration of many of the broad-leafed species. The dominant trees in the park are the Brisbane box, schima, gordonia, ivy tree and rose myrtle.

== Wildlife ==
The woods in the area are frequented by birds, and are especially a favourite of the black-eared kite which can be seen flying around the two reservoirs. Other birds frequenting the area are the greater coucal, hwamei, magpie-robin, magpie, crested mynah and kingfisher. Occasionally visitors may also catch a glimpse of the pangolin or squirrel.

== See also ==
- Tai Tam Country Park
- Tin Wan Shan
