= Kellett Bay =

Hong Kong bay

Coordinates: 22.24906°N 114.13664°E

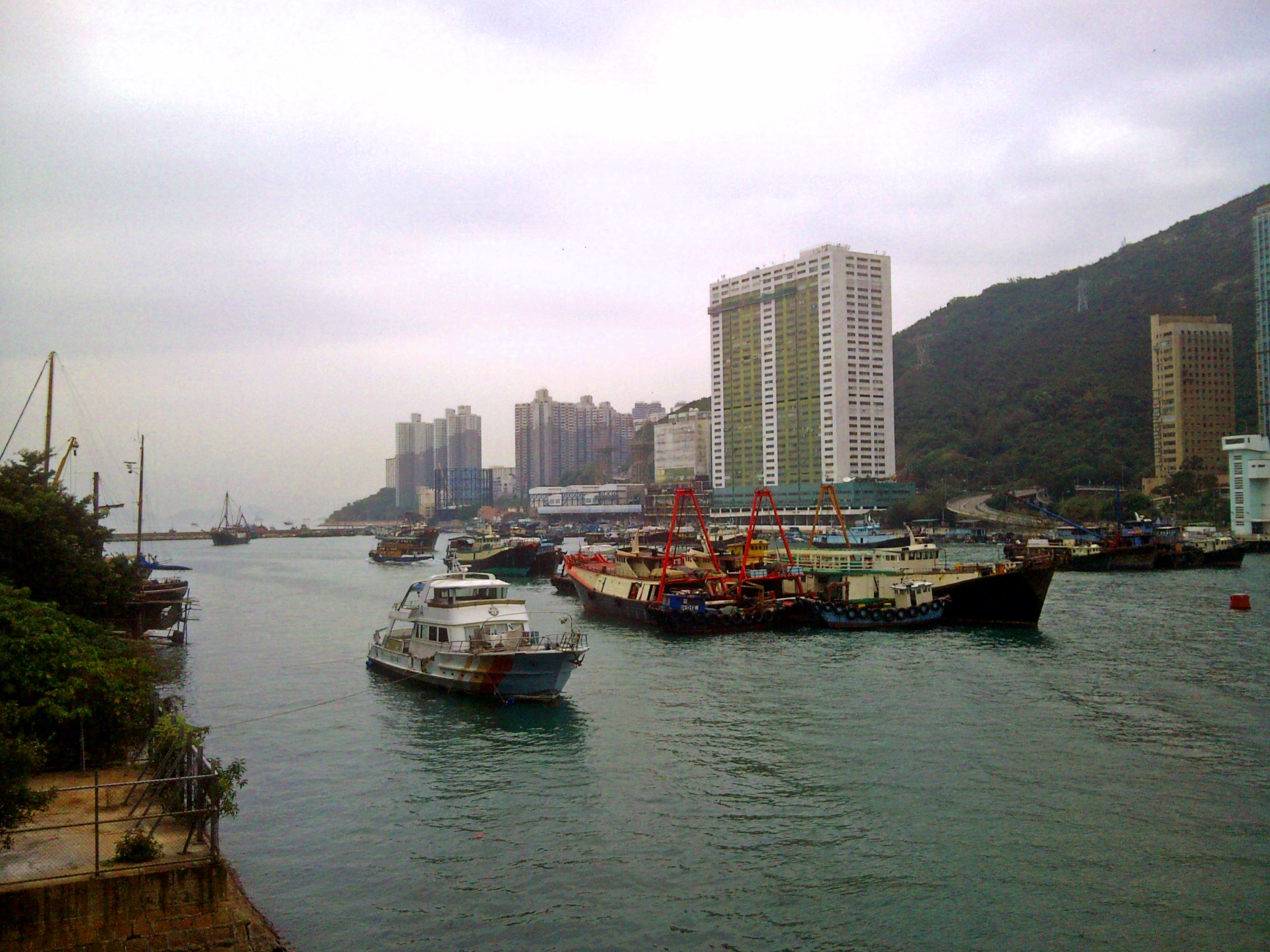
Kellett Bay viewed from Ap Lei Chau

Kellett Bay (Chinese: 奇力灣), or Kai Lung Wan (雞籠灣) is a bay on southwestern Hong Kong Island in Hong Kong, to the southeast of Waterfall Bay.

The pronunciation of Wan (灣) in Kai Lung Wan in the Cantonese language is like the one in 環 (as in Cheung Sha Wan, To Kwa Wan and Causeway Bay (Tung Lo Wan)).

Kellett Bay was named after the naval officer Sir Henry Kellett. Kellett Island and Mount Kellett were also named after him.

== History ==
The hill above the bay was a Chinese public cemetery, the Kai Lung Wan Cemetery (雞籠灣墳場), with Victoria Road linking with the northwestern side of the island. In 1960s, the cemetery was replaced by Wah Fu Estate at Waterfall Bay. Most of the areas are reclaimed to build Wah Kwai Estate.
