= Waterfall Bay, Hong Kong =

Bay of Hong Kong

Coordinates: 22.2526°N 114.133°E

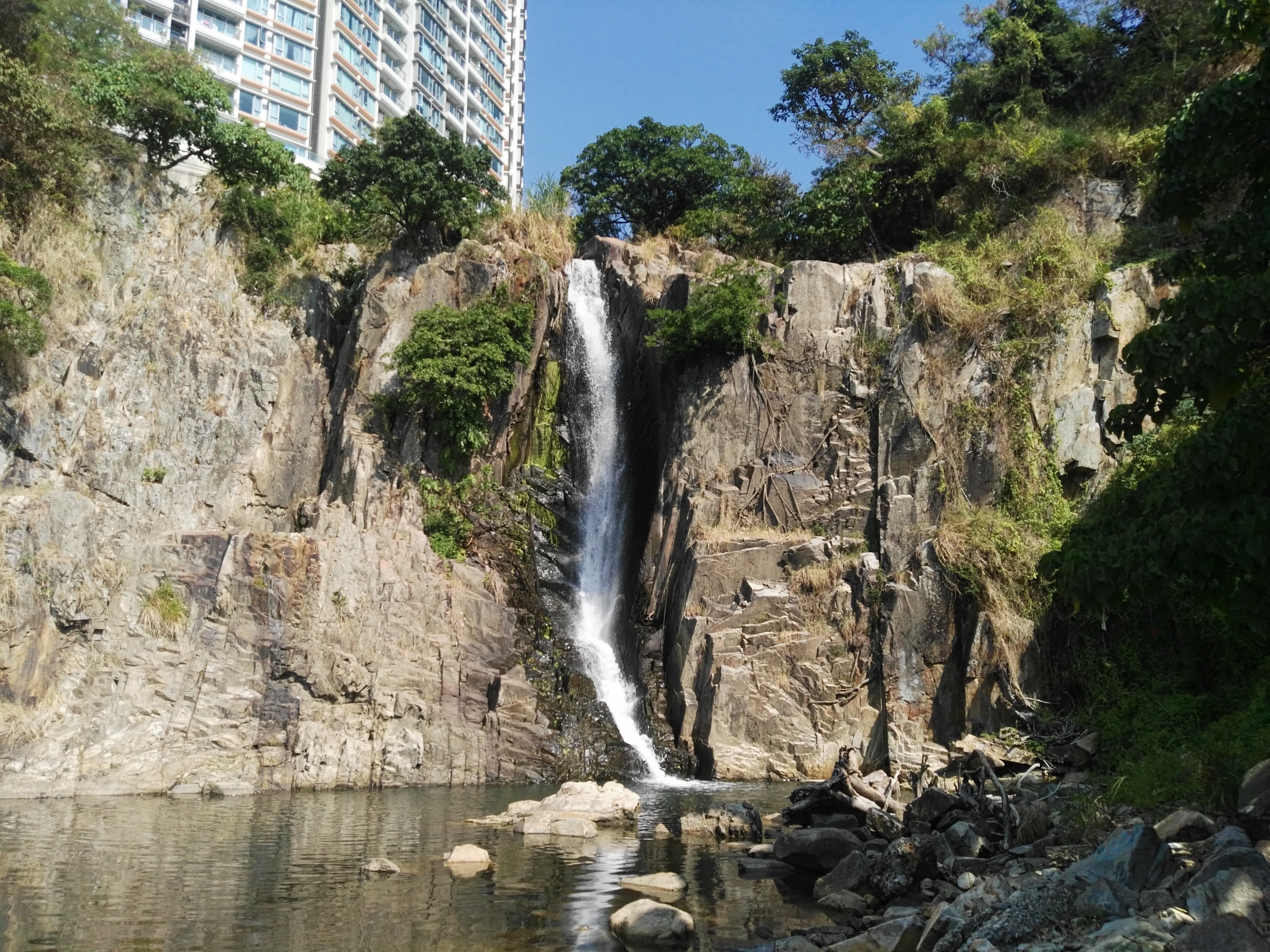
Waterfall Bay waterfall.

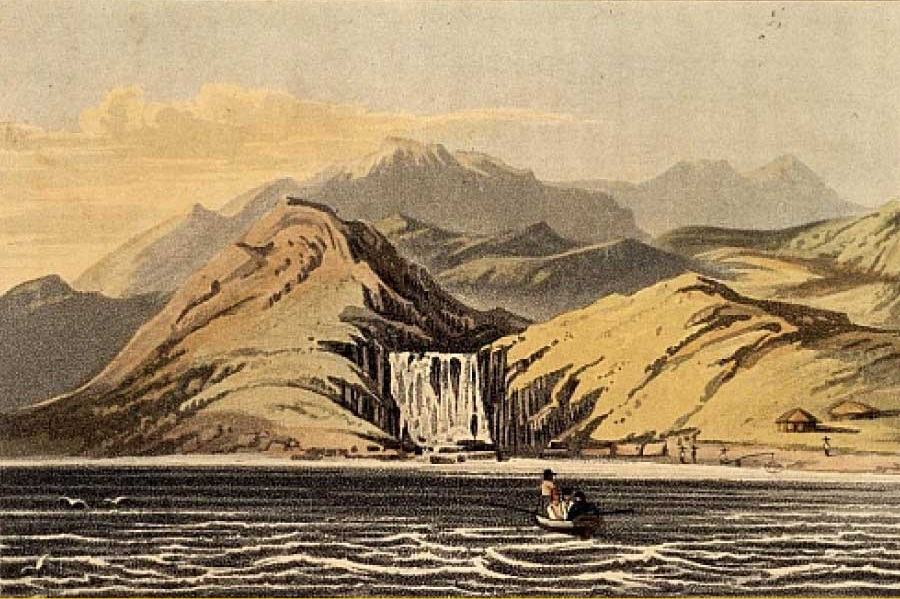
Pok Fu Lam Waterfall in the early 19th century.

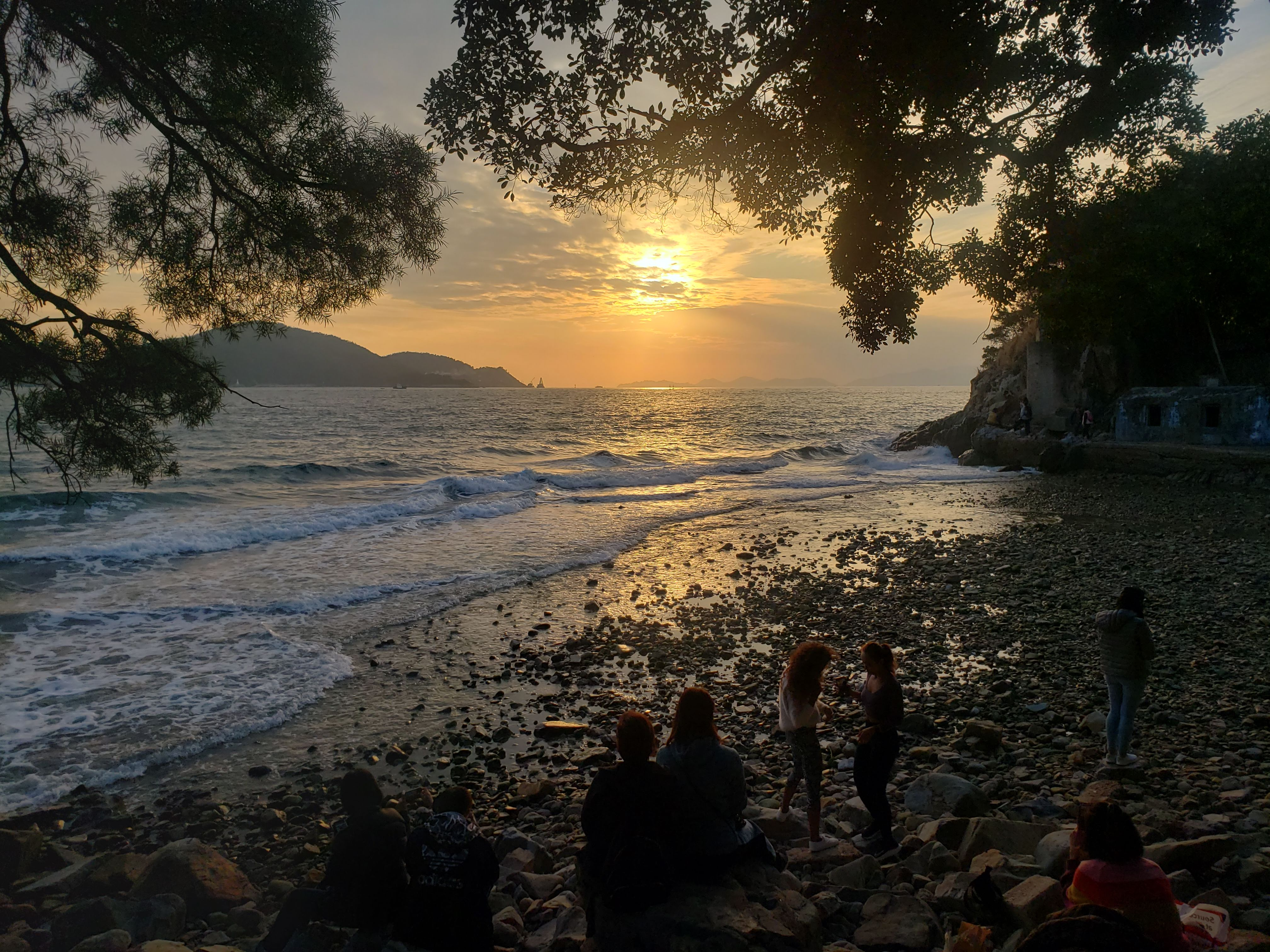
Sunset at Waterfall Bay, Hong Kong

Waterfall Bay or Pok Po Wan (Chinese: 瀑布灣; pinyin: Pùbùwān; Jyutping: buk6 bou3 waan1) is a bay in Pok Fu Lam, Hong Kong Island, Hong Kong. Located on the East Lamma Channel off the coast of Wah Fu Estate and Cyberport at Telegraph Bay, it is named after the waterfall that flows into it. The fresh water from this waterfall is said to have given the city its name – the translation of Hong Kong's name in Cantonese 香港 means "fragrant harbour". An eponymous park is now situated around the area.

== Location ==
Waterfall Bay is located in the Pok Fu Lam area, with the waterfall itself encompassed by Wah Fu Estate and the residential complex of Bel-Air on the Peak in Cyberport. Geographically, the bay forms part of the East Lamma Channel. The park surrounding the bay can be accessed by a road by the same name (Waterfall Bay Road), which is connected to Wah Fu Road. A trail at Waterfall Bay Park leads from a series of stairs down to a rocky/sandy area where the falls can be viewed from below.

== History ==
=== Pre-1841 British colonisation ===
External image
- An 1817 painting by William Harvell depicting the waterfall and the bay

It is not known when Waterfall Bay was first discovered. The first English-language mention of Hong Kong or the waterfall was in Dr. Clark Abel's "Narrative of a Journey to China," which recounted his 1816 travels with William Amherst on Amherst's failed mission to China. Lord Amherst used the bay as the rendezvous point for his ships before proceeding north. The visit produced the first engravings of the falls.

Fishermen working in the southern part of Hong Kong Island referred to Aberdeen Harbour as "Hong Kong", which translates to "fragrant harbour". This name is attributed to the fresh water that flowed into Waterfall Bay from its namesake natural feature. The waterfall became well known among British and European sailors, who would refill their fresh water supplies directly from the falls on their journey towards other ports in Asia, such as Galle, Ceylon, and Malacca, Malaya. This brought about the city's reputation for its abundant supply of drinking water, one of the few places on the coast of China to have such a resource. As a result, the name derived from the waterfall was later utilised to refer to the entire island and Victoria Harbour.

=== Post-1841 ===
Construction of the nearby Pok Fu Lam Reservoir—the first key water storage facility in the colony—was finished in 1863. In order to accomplish this, the streams flowing from the mountains that are the source of the waterfall were dammed. This greatly reduced the flow intensity of the waterfall.

=== Second World War ===
Due to the bay's strategic location overlooking the Lamma Channel, it was utilised by the British during the Second World War to defend the colony from the Japanese. A pillbox and searchlight—known as a Lyon Light—was constructed; the former served as a bunker for Allied soldiers during the Battle of Hong Kong. Now in ruins, they can still be accessed at low tide.

== See also ==
- List of bays in Hong Kong
- List of waterfalls
