= Wah Fu Estate =

Public housing estate in Hong Kong

Coordinates: 22.2524°N 114.1345°E

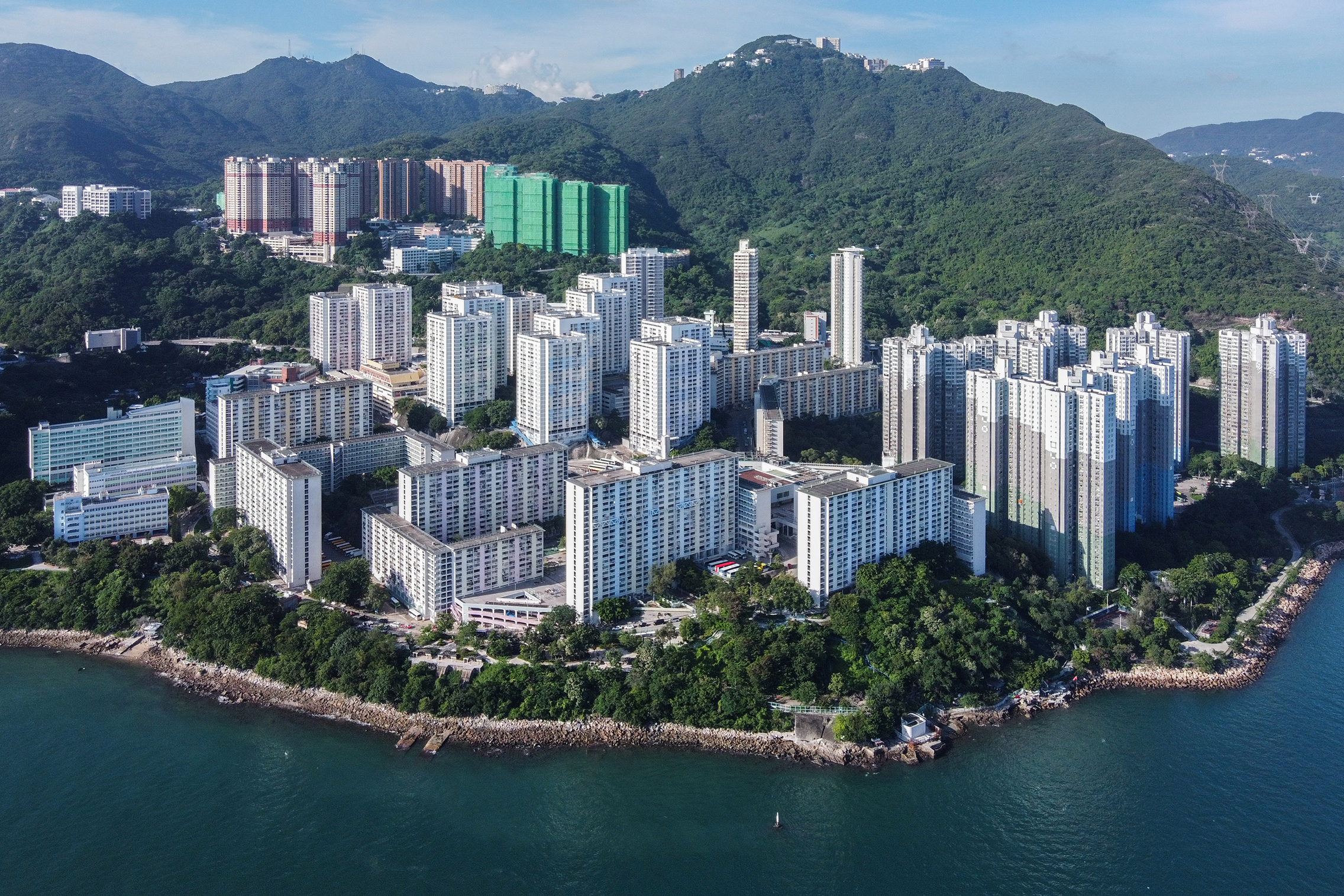
Wah Fu (I) Estate

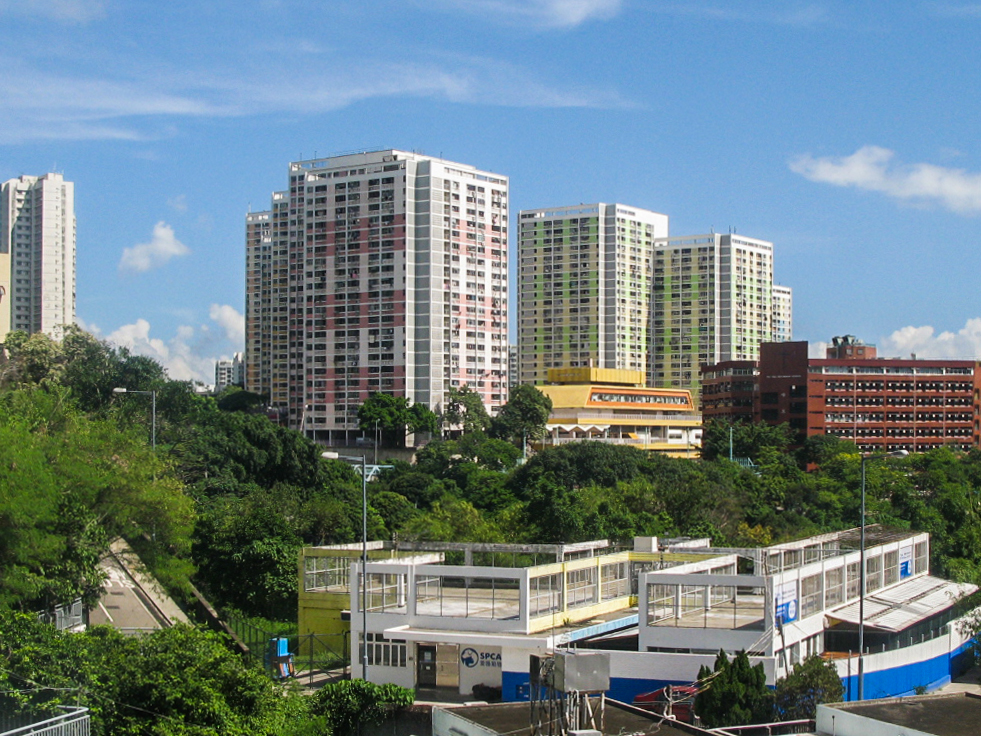
Wah Fu (II) Estate

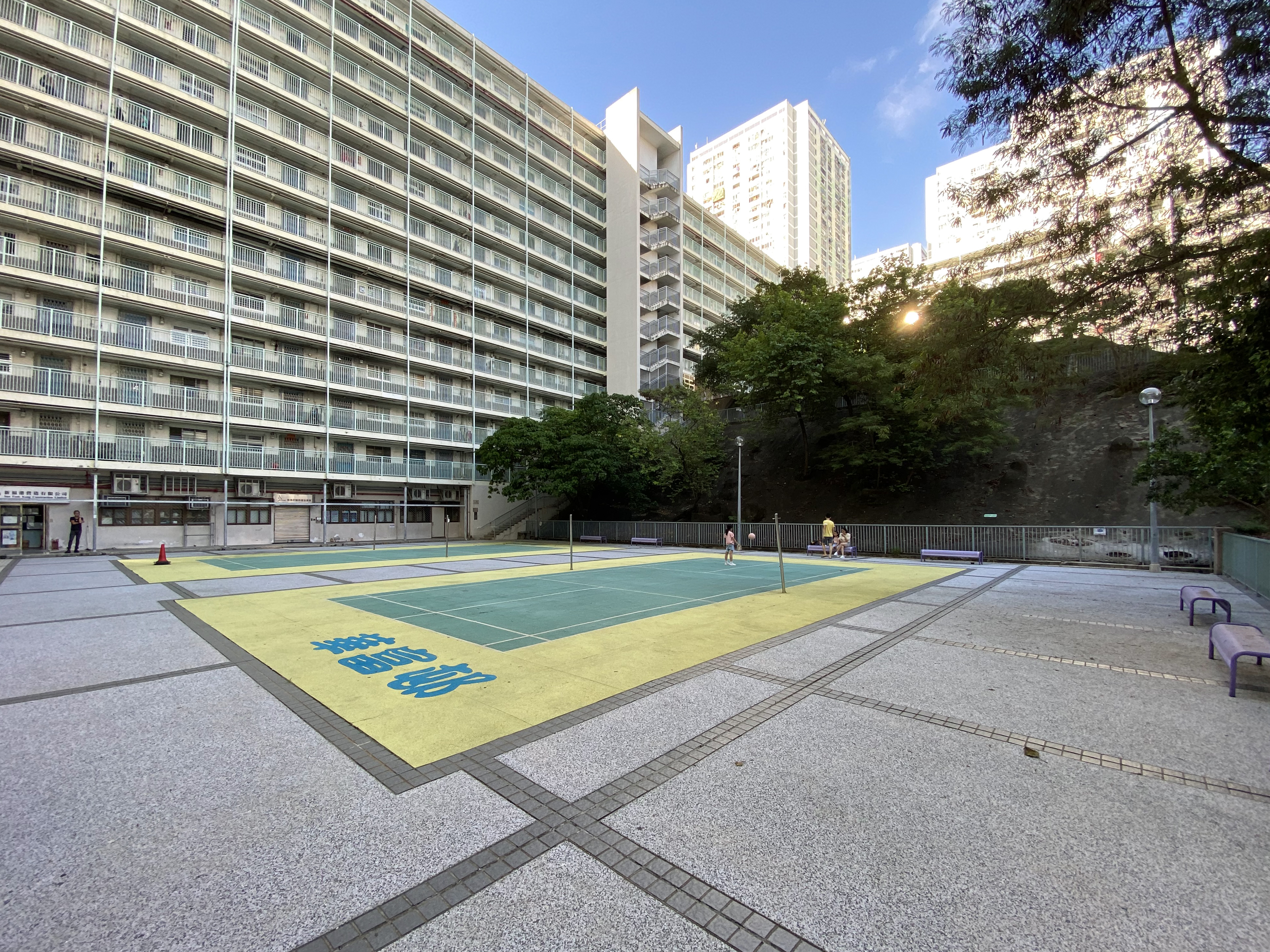
Wah Ching House, Wah Fu Estate

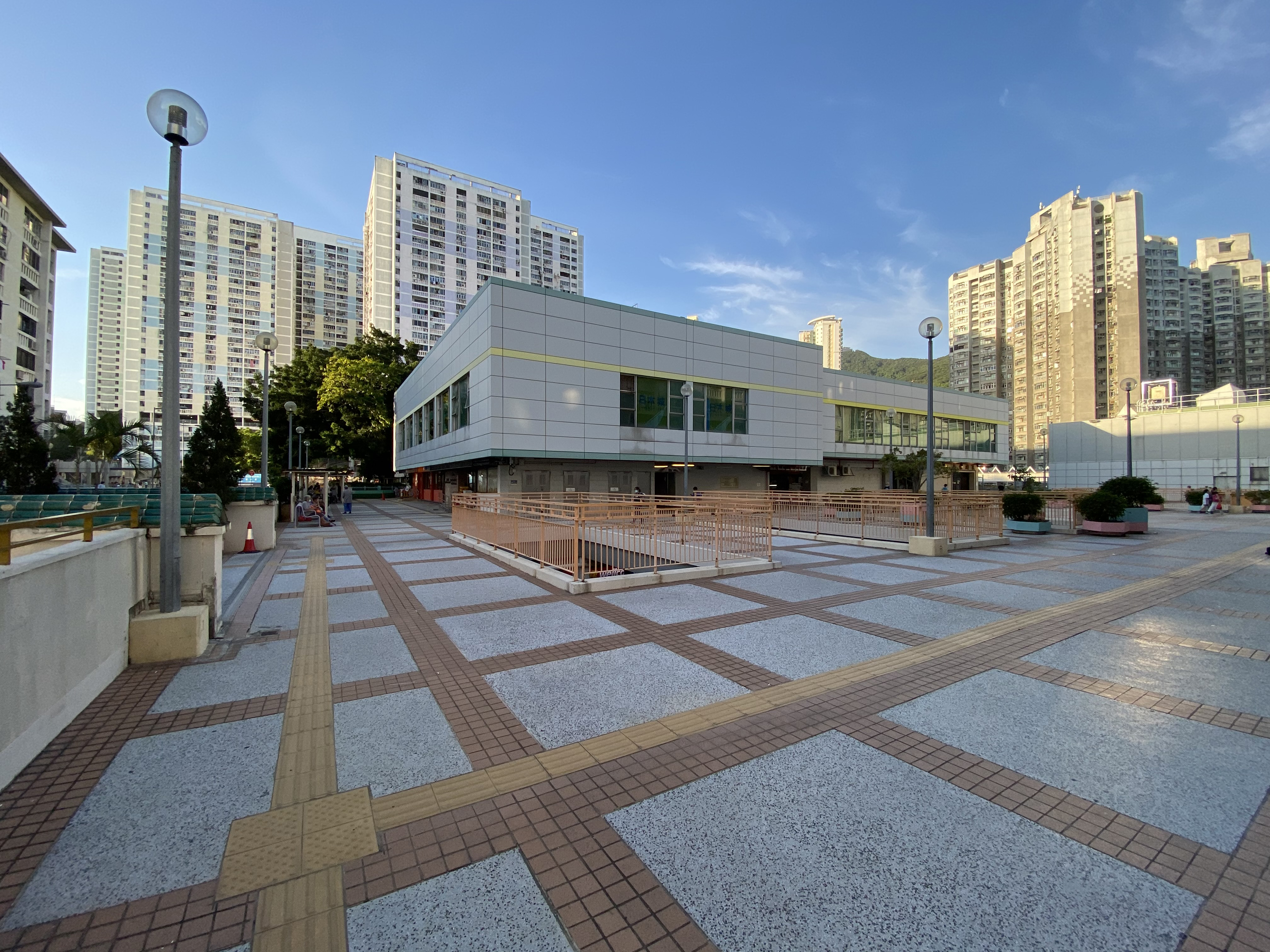
Wah Fu (I)Shopping Centre

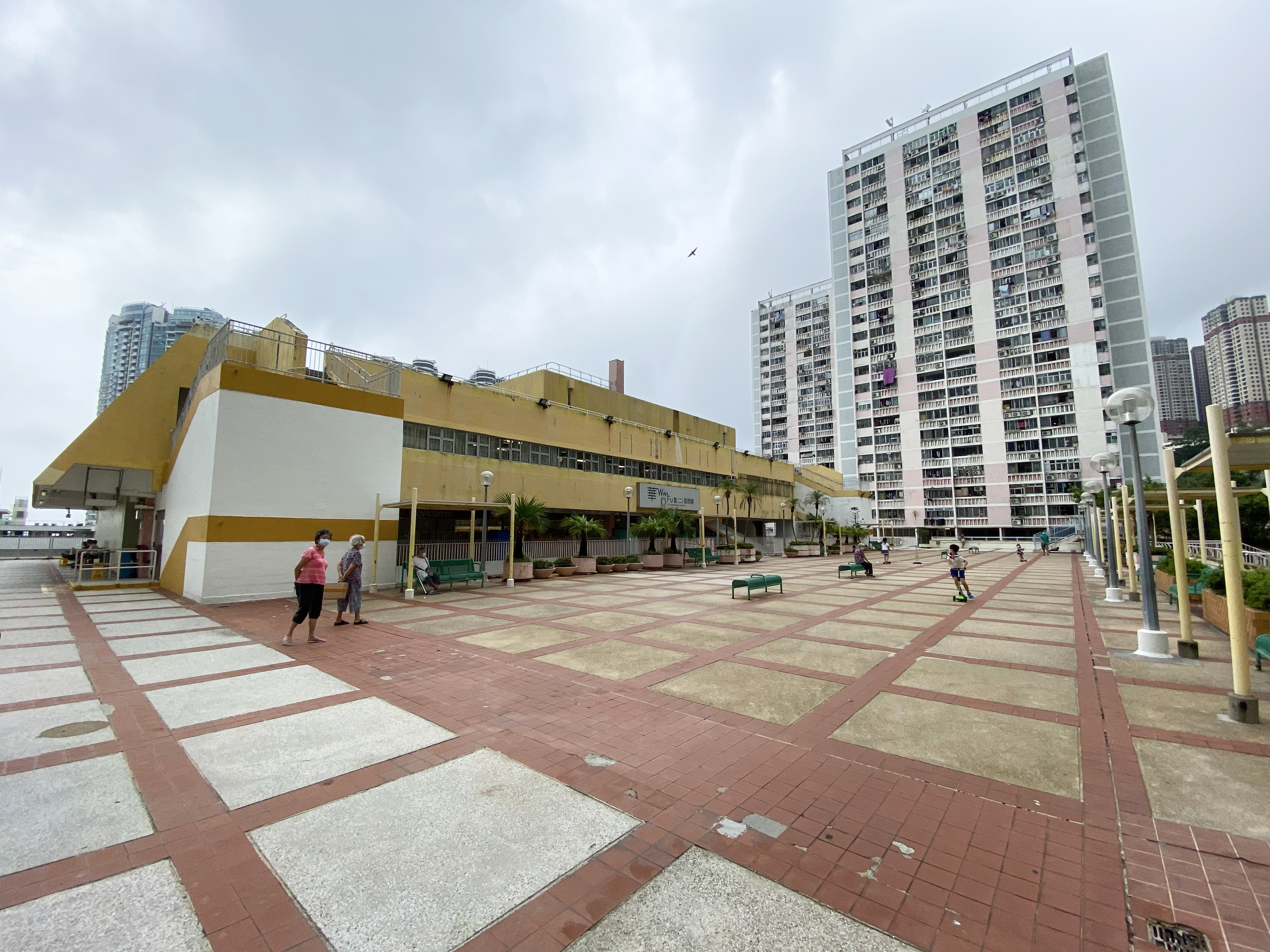
Wah Fu (II) Commercial Complex

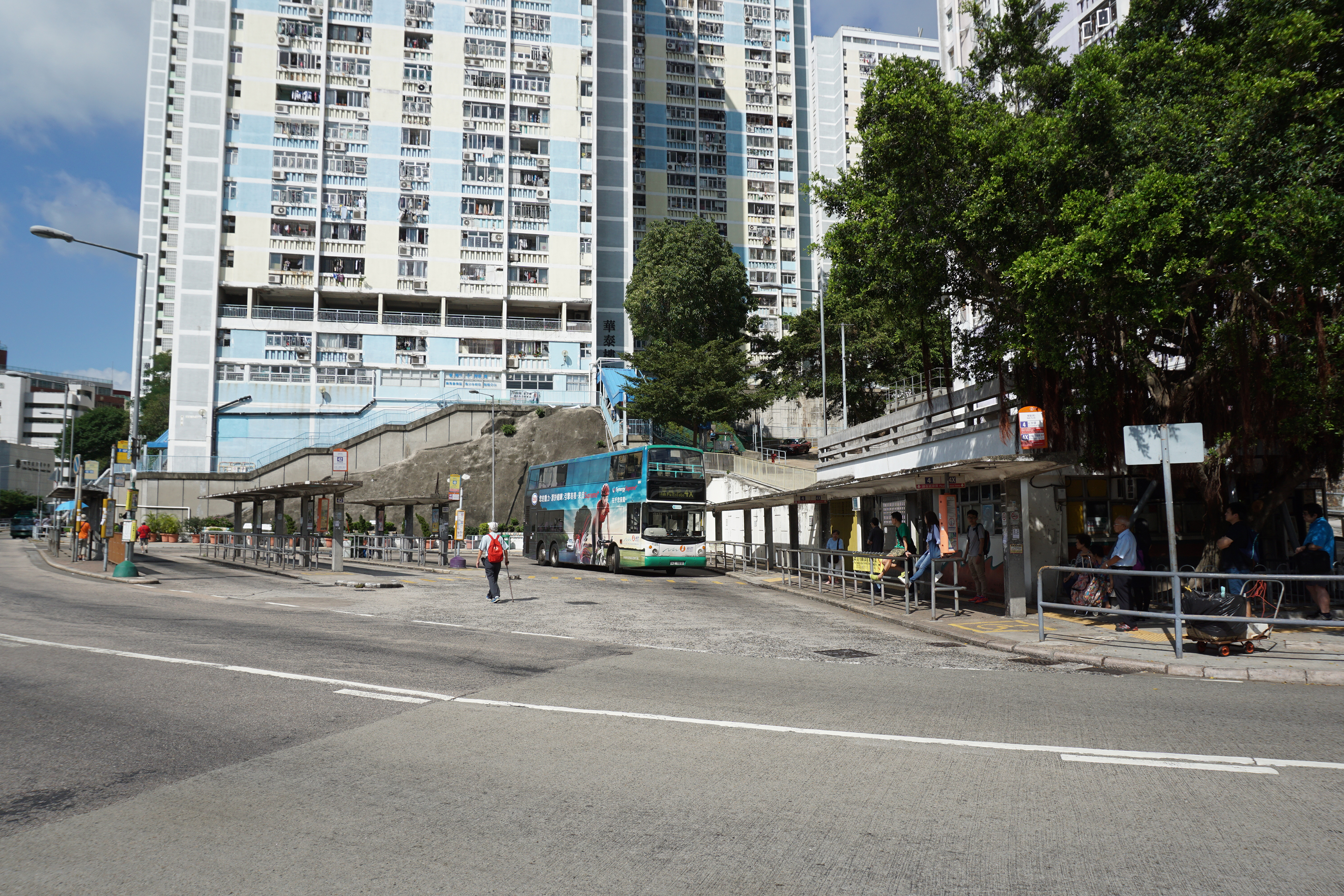
Wah Fu Bus Terminus

Wah Fu Estate (Chinese: 華富邨) is a public housing estate located next to Waterfall Bay, Pok Fu Lam in Hong Kong's Southern District. Designed by Dr. Donald Liao, the former director of housing. It was built on a new town concept in 1967 and was renovated in 2003. Divided into Wah Fu (I) Estate (華富(一)邨) and Wah Fu (II) Estate (華富(二)邨), the whole estate has a total of 18 residential blocks completed between 1967 and 1978.

There are several primary and secondary schools in the estate, including Pui Ying Secondary School, SKH Lui Ming Choi Secondary School and Caritas Chong Yut Ming Secondary School. They provide education to children in the estate and the surrounding areas. Fortuna Theatre is the only cinema on the estate.

== Houses ==
Name	Type	Completion
Wah On House	Old Slab	November 1967
Wah Lok House	Old Slab	February 1968
Wah Chun House	Old Slab	March 1968 - September 1968
Wah Hong House	Old Slab	March 1968 - September 1968
Wah Kwong House	Old Slab	March 1968 - September 1968
Wah Mei House	Old Slab	March 1968 - September 1968
Wah Kee House	Old Slab	October 1968 - February 1969
Wah Shun House	Old Slab	October 1968 - February 1969
Wah Yu House	Old Slab	October 1968 - February 1969
Wah Ching House	Old Slab	October 1968 - February 1969
Wah Ming House	Old Slab	October 1968 - February 1969
Wah Kin House	Old Slab	October 1968 - February 1969
Wah Cheung House	Twin Tower	July 1970 - June 1971
Wah Sang House	Twin Tower	July 1970 - June 1971
Wah Hing House	Twin Tower	July 1970 - June 1971
Wah Tai House	Twin Tower	July 1970 - June 1971
Wah Chui House	Twin Tower	1978
Wah King House	Twin Tower	1978

== Redevelopment ==
Announced in the chief executive's 2014 Policy Address, Wah Fu Estate will be redeveloped. The new estate will be built nearby. It is planned that after the Wah Fu residents have moved to the new estates, Wah Fu will be redeveloped starting from 2024.

== Education ==
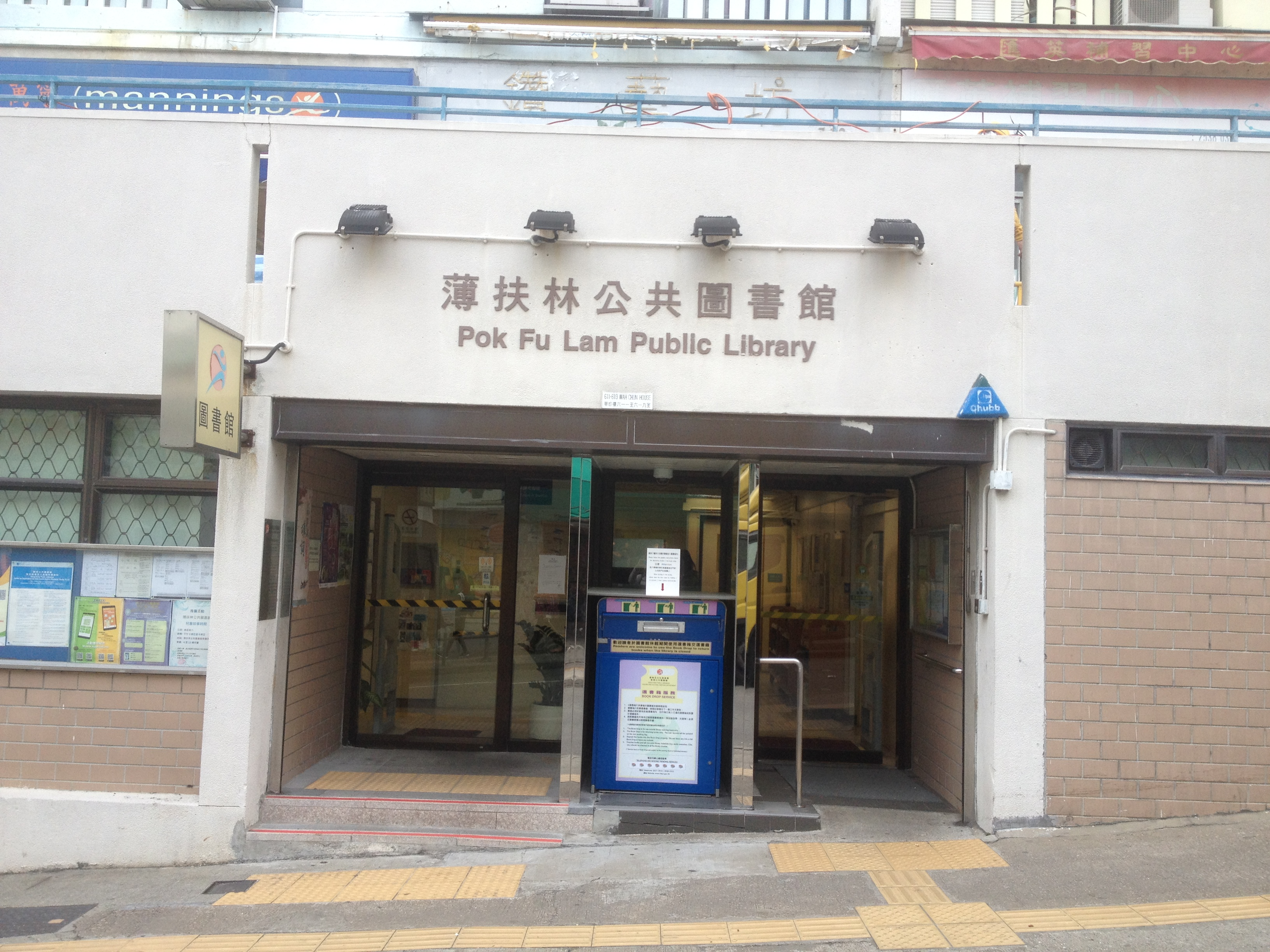
Pok Fu Lam Public Library, in Wah Fu Estate

Wah Fu Estate is in Primary One Admission (POA) School Net 18. Within the school net are multiple aided schools (operated independently but funded with government money) and Hong Kong Southern District Government Primary School (香港南區官立小學).

Hong Kong Public Library operates the Pokfulam Public Library in Wah Fu Estate.

== Notable residents ==
Legal

- Wong Yan-lung (黃仁龍): Former Secretary for Justice, lived in the estate in the 1970s/1980s.
- Miles Jackson-Lipkin

Media and entertainment

- Kitty Yuen (阮小儀): Disc jockey with Commercial Radio Hong Kong, former actress with TVB.
- Wakin Chau (周華健): Singer
- Halina Tam (譚小環): Actress/presenter, Winner of the Miss Hong Kong Pageant 1994.
- Wai Ka-fai (韋家輝): Film producer and former TVB producer
