= Lion Rock Country Park =

Country park in the New Territories, Hong Kong

Coordinates: 22.3454°N 114.1833°E

- Traditional Chinese: 獅子山郊野公園
- Simplified Chinese: 狮子山郊野公园
Transcriptions
Standard Mandarin
- Hanyu Pinyin: Shīzǐ Shān Jiāoyě Gōngyuán
Yue: Cantonese
- Yale Romanization: Sī Jí Sāan Gāau Yéh Gūng Yùhn
- Jyutping: si1 zi2 saan1 gaau1 je5 gung1 jyun4*2

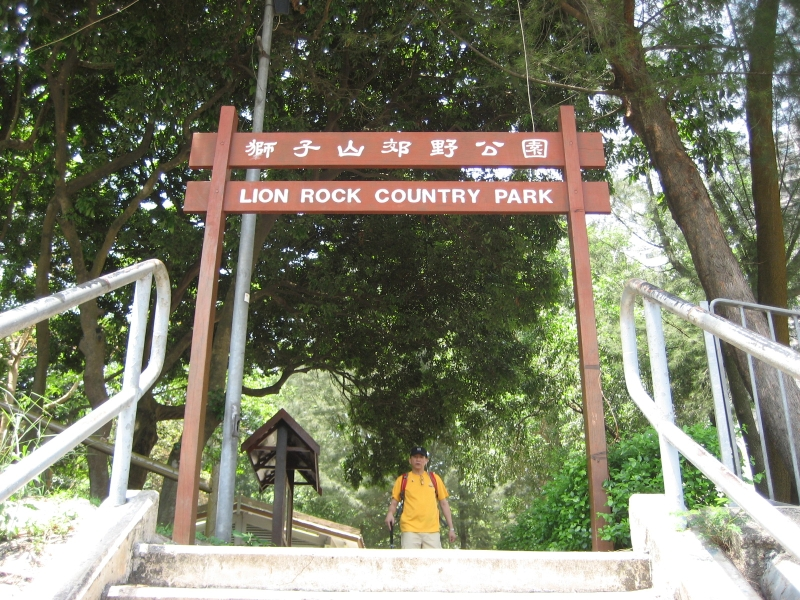
Entrance gate of Lion Rock Country Park

Lion Rock Country Park (established 24 June 1977) is a country park, located in the New Territories, Hong Kong. It consists of approximately 5.57 square kilometres (2.15 sq mi) of land, including Lion Rock and Mong Fu Shek (Amah Rock) and their surrounding scenic hillsides, of which 3.48 square kilometres (1.34 sq mi) is forestry plantation.

== Landmarks ==
The dominant topographical feature of the park is the Lion Rock, which from some angles resembles a lion perching on a hill ridge.

Another topographical feature of the park is the Mong Fu Shek (Amah Rock). The legend is that of a faithful wife who climbed the hills every day, carrying her son, to watch for the return of her husband, not knowing he had been drowned at sea. In reward for her faithfulness, she was turned into a rock by the Goddess of the Sea so that her spirit could unite with that of her husband.

Beacon Hill is another landscape feature of the park. Its Chinese name derives from the warning fire signals which were lit during the Qing dynasty on the hill top, which was one of the many "lookouts" guarded by soldiers to alert surrounding areas to danger from pirates or hostile intruders. Today, a radar station and a police transmitter occupy the top of the hill.

== Sightseeing ==
From the slopes of Golden Hill and several places along the western ridge at the park, magnificent panoramic views can be enjoyed. From these localities the whole length of Smuggler's Ridge, Tai Mo Shan (the highest peak in Hong Kong), Needle Hill, Sha Tin New Town, Lion Rock and Beacon Hill can be seen. The northern part of Kowloon, the western anchorage of the harbour, and Stonecutters Island, the housing estates of Kwai Chung, the container port, the industrial parts of Tsing Yi Island and the town of Tsuen Wan can also be viewed from these vantage points.

The Lion Rock area has long been a favourite for picnickers, hikers and tourists because it includes scenic spots such as Lion Rock, Beacon Hill and Mong Fu Shek.

== Vegetation ==
The more common species in the area include Pinus elliottii (slash pine), Myrica rubra (the Strawberry Tree), Heptapleurum heptaphyllum (the Ivy Tree), Reevesia thyrsoidea (Reevesia), Phyllostachys aurea (Fishpole Bamboo), Enkianthus quinqueflorus (the Lunar New Year Bellflower) and species of Melastoma.

== Wildlife ==
The area is specially noted for two species of wildlife, the black-eared kite and the long-tailed macaque.

The black-eared kite is a migratory bird found in Asia and Australia. It is a scavenger, feeding on offal, carrion, refuse and dead fish in the harbour. Eagle's Nest, a well wooded ridge in the park, is one of the popular nesting areas near the harbour, probably because of the presence of tall pine trees.

The long-tailed macaques present in this area are not local wildstock but are descendants of monkeys released in 1920. Their food includes leaves, fruits, insects and small animals. It is illegal to feed monkeys. They can attack and inflict painful bites on human being, especially in their mating season or when they have their young with them.

== Geology ==
Varieties of granite which occur include Sung Kong, Cheung Chau and Ma On Shan Granites. In some places the granites are cut by quartz veins containing, amongst other minerals, wolframite, which is tungsten-bearing.

== Attractions ==
Lion Rock has long been a favorite crag for multi-pitch rock climbers in Hong Kong: in fact, the first modern rock climbs in the territory were completed by RAF personnel stationed at Kai Tak Airport in the 1950s. Owing to the most convenient transport, people enjoy themselves in the parks with different kinds of activities, such as morning walking and hiking. Particularly on Sunday and Public Holiday, it is very busy in the parks. There are jogging trails, morning walker gardens and barbecue sites etc. provided in the parks.

An extensive network of footpaths has been laid out in the park providing access to almost every part or the park. MacLehose Trail - Stages 5 and 6 starts from Sha Tin Pass to Shing Mun Reservoir. Wilson Trail - Stage 6 begins from Tai Po Road to Shing Mun Reservoir Main Dam via Smugglers Ridge (Ma Tse Keng).

Within the park there is a waymarked family walk provided for family users.

Surrounding the Reception and Shek Lei Pui reservoirs are two jogging trails specially designed for visitors who enjoy morning exercises and keeping fit.

Moreover, there is a tree walk to guide visitors who wish to know more about trees in the park.

A 15-station fitness trail, with specially designed equipment, is located on the catchwater track leading eastwards from the Tai Po Road near 51 milestone. In the western part of the park there is a nature trail which provides an opportunity for studying the natural history and geography of the area.

== Transportation ==
There is no road access to the Lion Rock Country Park; walkers may enter by footpaths via Hung Mui Kuk, Tsok Pok Hang from Sha Tin, or via Wang Tau Hom from Kowloon and from Tai Po Road via the catchwater footpath near Kowloon Reservoir.

== See also ==
- Geography of Hong Kong
- Conservation in Hong Kong
- List of places in Hong Kong
