= List of reservoirs of Hong Kong =

Reservoirs in Hong Kong are spread fairly evenly over the entire 1,104 km^{2} of Hong Kong. There is plenty of space for small reservoirs in Hong Kong, as the hilly areas provide valleys suitable for water storage. However, the larger reservoirs, i.e. High Island Reservoir and Plover Cove Reservoir, were built differently. Dams were built where the reservoir's edge was proposed to be, sea water was drained out and replaced with fresh water.

== Drinking-water reservoirs ==
=== New Territories ===
- High Island Reservoir (萬宜水庫)
- Plover Cove Reservoir (船灣淡水湖)
- Shing Mun Reservoirs (城門水塘)
  - Shing Mun (Jubilee) Reservoir (城門水塘)
  - Lower Shing Mun Reservoir (下城門水塘)
- Tai Lam Chung Reservoir (大欖涌水塘)

=== Kowloon ===
- Kowloon Group of Reservoirs (九龍水塘)
  - Kowloon Reservoir (九龍水塘)
  - Kowloon Byewash Reservoir (九龍副水塘)
  - Kowloon Reception Reservoir (九龍接收水塘)
  - Shek Lei Pui Reservoir (石梨貝水塘)

=== Hong Kong Island ===
- Aberdeen Reservoirs (香港仔水塘)
  - Aberdeen Upper Reservoir (香港仔上水塘)
  - Aberdeen Lower Reservoir (香港仔下水塘)
- Pok Fu Lam Reservoir (薄扶林水塘)
- Tai Tam Reservoirs (大潭水塘)
  - Tai Tam Upper Reservoir (大潭上水塘)
  - Tai Tam Byewash Reservoir (大潭副水塘)
  - Tai Tam Intermediate Reservoir (大潭中水塘)
  - Tai Tam Tuk Reservoir (大潭篤水塘)
- Wong Nai Chung Reservoir (黃泥涌水塘)

=== Lantau Island ===
- Discovery Bay Reservoir (愉景灣水塘)
- Shek Pik Reservoir (石壁水塘)

== Irrigation reservoirs ==
- Ho Pui Reservoir (河背水塘)
- Hok Tau Reservoir (鶴藪水塘)
- Hung Shui Hang Reservoir (洪水坑水塘)
- Inspiration Lake (迪欣湖)
- Lam Tei Reservoir (藍地水塘)
- Lau Shui Heung Reservoir (流水響水塘)
- Sham Tseng Settlement Basin (深井聚水塘)
- Shap Long Reservoir (十塱水塘)
- Tsing Tam Reservoirs (清潭水塘)
  - Tsing Tam Upper Reservoir (上清潭水塘)
  - Tsing Tam Lower Reservoir (下清潭水塘)
- Wong Nai Tun Reservoir (黃泥墩水塘)
- Kwu Tung Reservoir (古洞水塘)

== Flushing-water reservoirs ==
- Ma Yau Tong Reservoir (馬游塘水塘)
- Jordan Valley Reservoir (佐敦谷水塘) - closed in late 1970s.

== See also ==
- Water supply and sanitation in Hong Kong
- Conservation in Hong Kong
- List of dams and reservoirs
