= Kam Shan =

Kam Shan may refer to several places in Hong Kong:

- Kam Shan Country Park (金山郊野公園)
- Kam Shan (金山), also known as Golden Hill, a hill within Kam Shan Country Park
- Kam Shan, Tai Po District (錦山), an area including and around Kam Shan Village (錦山村), in Tai Po District
