= Smuggler's Ridge =

Hill in Hong Kong

- 孖指徑
- Location within Hong Kong

Highest point
- Elevation: 337 m (1,106 ft)
- Listing: List of mountains, peaks and hills in Hong Kong
- Coordinates: 22°22′25″N 114°08′46″E

Geography
- Location: New Territories, Hong Kong

Smugglers' Ridge or Ma Tsz Keng (Chinese: 孖指徑) is a hill with a height of 337 metres (1,106 ft) in New Territories, Hong Kong. It is inside Kam Shan Country Park. A part of Shing Mun Tunnels is built underneath this hill.

== Name ==
The name Smugglers' Ridge originally referred to a ridge trail on this mountain. Later, this mountain was named after this ridge trail.

== Access ==
Stage 6 of the MacLehose Trail goes through this peak. By continuing northwest at distance post W066 on the Wilson Trail, instead of the intended route, along a path with sparse woodland, Smuggler's Ridge can be reached.

== Geography ==
Smuggler's Ridge rises slowly from its start to the south until steeply dropping at its highest point to the north, where it meets MacLehose Trail stage 6 again at Shing Mun Redoubt. Tai Mo Shan, Needle Hill and other Kowloon Hills can be seen from Smuggler's Ridge, along with Kwai Chung to the west, parts of Shatin to the east, and Cheung Sha Wan to the south.

Smuggler's Ridge
- Traditional Chinese: 孖指徑
- Simplified Chinese: 孖指径
- Literal meaning: Two Finger Road
Transcriptions
Standard Mandarin
- Hanyu Pinyin: Mā Zhǐ Jìng
Hakka
- Romanization: Ma1 Ji2 Ging3
Yue: Cantonese
- Yale Romanization: mā jí ging
- Jyutping: Maa1 Zi2 Ging3

== See also ==
- Golden Hill
