= Luk Tung Kuen =

Exercise routine

A regular group in Pitshanger

Luk Tung Kuen (六通拳) is an exercise routine similar to tai chi. It consists of 36 movements which are usually performed in sequence each day, early in the morning. Groups of people commonly meet regularly to perform this together outdoors in a park.

The exercises were originally devised by an acupuncturist, Ho Wing Siu (何永紹) in Canton in the early 20th century. These were based upon Chinese martial arts and the meridians of Traditional Chinese medicine. He taught the exercises to his daughter, Ha Kinh (何瓊), around 1934 when she had malaria and she recovered in a week.

Her family moved to Saigon in 1941 to escape a Japanese army but her life was still difficult because of the war and she fell ill again. A Malaysian doctor recommended exercise and so she repeated the exercises she had been taught. She recovered and the doctor confirmed this. Together, they formalised the exercises and named them Luk Tung Kuen (六通拳) which literally means six circulation fist. This name indicates that the exercises cover all six parts of the body, encouraging healthy circulation and making a fist for some actions, as in Chinese boxing.

Ha Kinh started teaching the exercises in Hong Kong in 1963, starting by the Shek Lei Pui Reservoir which is now in the Kam Shan Country Park. They became popular and spread to other parts of the world such as the United States. A Luk Tung Kuen Association was formed to promote the exercises and Ha Kinh's teachings which include charitable and sociable principles.

== Movements ==
Each movement has a specific form and its name typically describes the main action or posture. The different movements are typically narrated and the repetitions counted aloud with occasional emphasis by words such as geng-li (頸力), meaning neck-strength, used as an exhortation, cadence or chant.

1. Open the Door with Hands
2. Second Step of Open the Door
3. Cross Hand
4. Arms at Horizontal Position
5. Turn Over One's Hand
6. The Beauty Looking at the Mirror
7. Riding the Bicycle
8. Drawing a Circle
9. Stand Firm and Play the Drum
10. Hand Exercise
11. Stand Firm and Play Chinese Boxing
12. Crab Posture
13. Hands Up and Down
14. Windmill
15. Stretch Out the Hands and Hold Back the Feet
16. Yin and Yang
17. Breathing in
18. To Shovel the Mud
19. Twist the Hands
20. Strike with One Hand
21. Draw Back the Belly and with Arms Akimbo
22. Stretch the Arm and Kick Up the Foot
23. Bouncing up and down – like a jumping jack
24. Posture Eagle
25. Change the Breathing Method
26. Exercise for the Eyes
27. Exercise for the Neck
28. Twist the Waist
29. Spread Out the Hands
30. Cover the Ears with Hands and Press the Fingers
31. Waist Massage Exercise
32. Jogging
33. Two Dragons Spit Pearls
34. The Burst of Plum Blossom for Six Times
35. Standing on One Leg
36. The Stretching of Legs – like a lunge
