= Kowloon Group of Reservoirs =

- 九龍水塘 (Chinese)
- Location within Hong Kong
- Interactive map of Kowloon Group of Reservoirs
- Location: Kam Shan Country Park, Kowloon
- Type: Reservoirs
- Primary inflows: Rainfall
- Basin countries: Hong Kong
- Designation: Monuments of Hong Kong
- Built: Kowloon Reservoir: 1910; Kowloon Byewash Reservoir: 1931; Kowloon Reception Reservoir: 1926
- Water volume: Kowloon Reservoir: 1,578,000 m^{3} (55,700,000 cu ft); Kowloon Byewash Reservoir: 800,000 m^{3} (28,000,000 cu ft); Kowloon Reception Reservoir: 121,000 m^{3} (4,300,000 cu ft)
- Surface elevation: 210–280 m (690–920 ft)

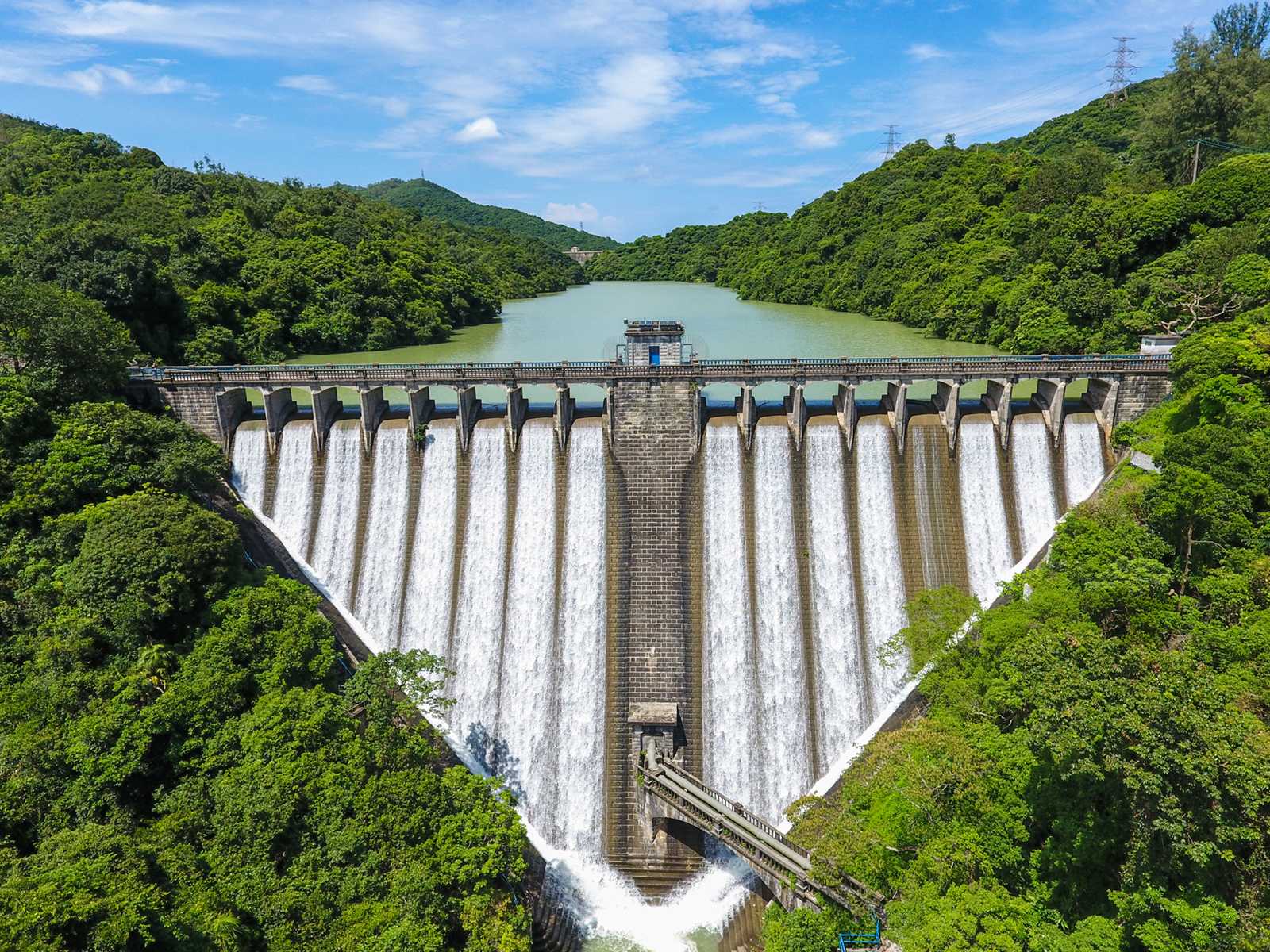
Dam of Kowloon Byewash Reservoir.

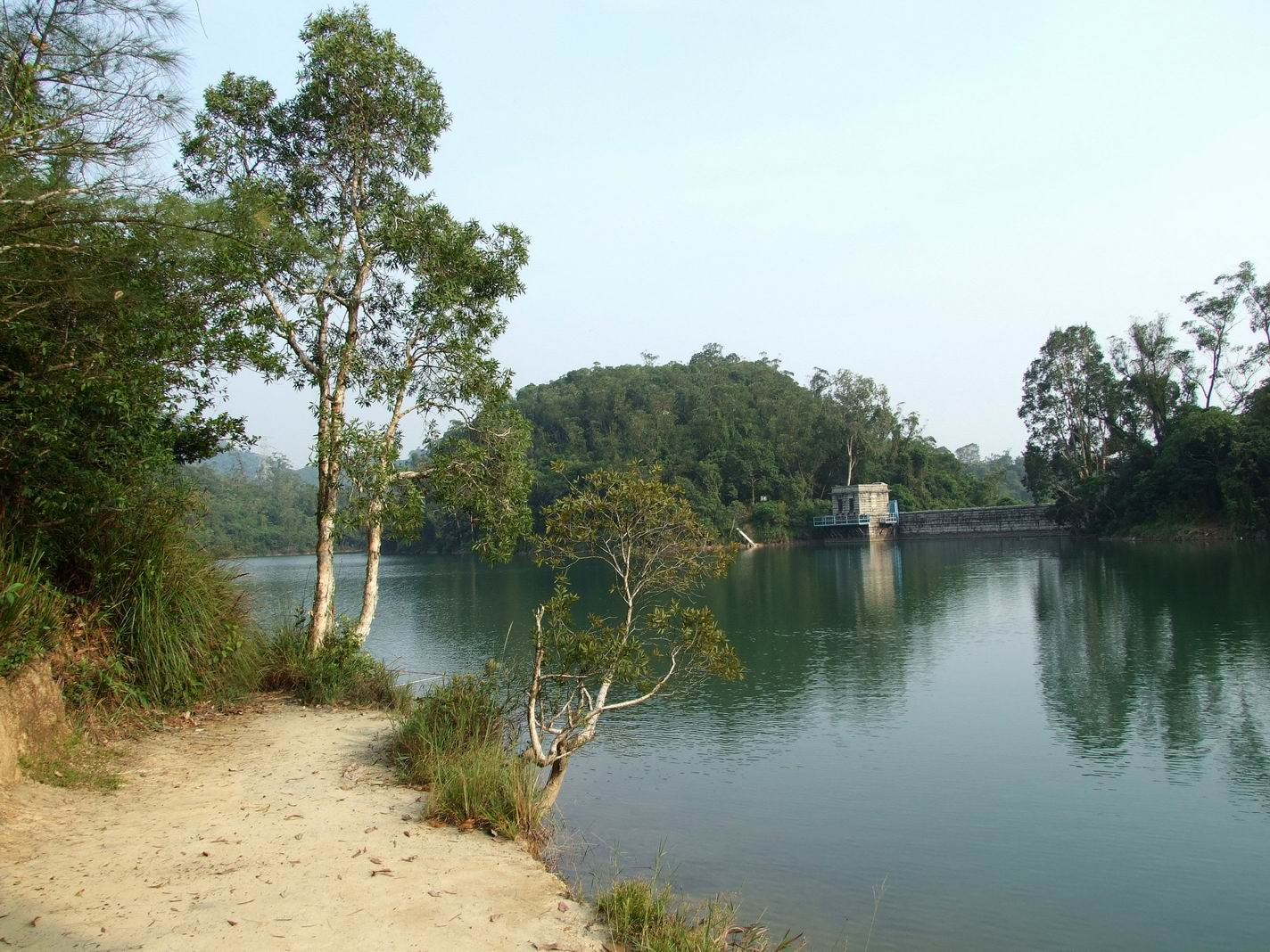
Kowloon Reception Reservoir.

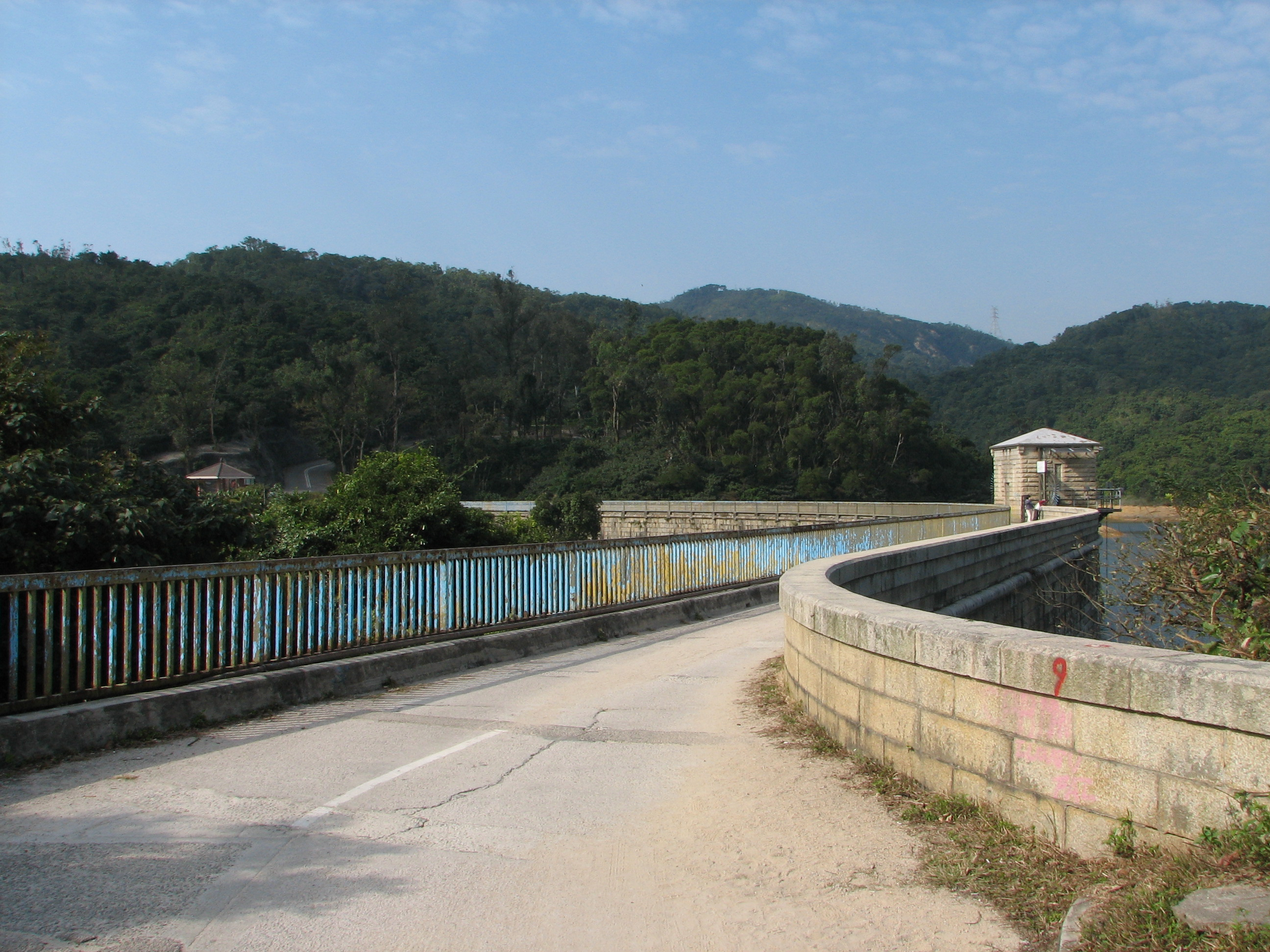
Golden Hill Road (金山路) passes on the top of Kowloon Reservoir Main Dam. Kowloon Reservoir Main Dam Valve House is visible on the right.

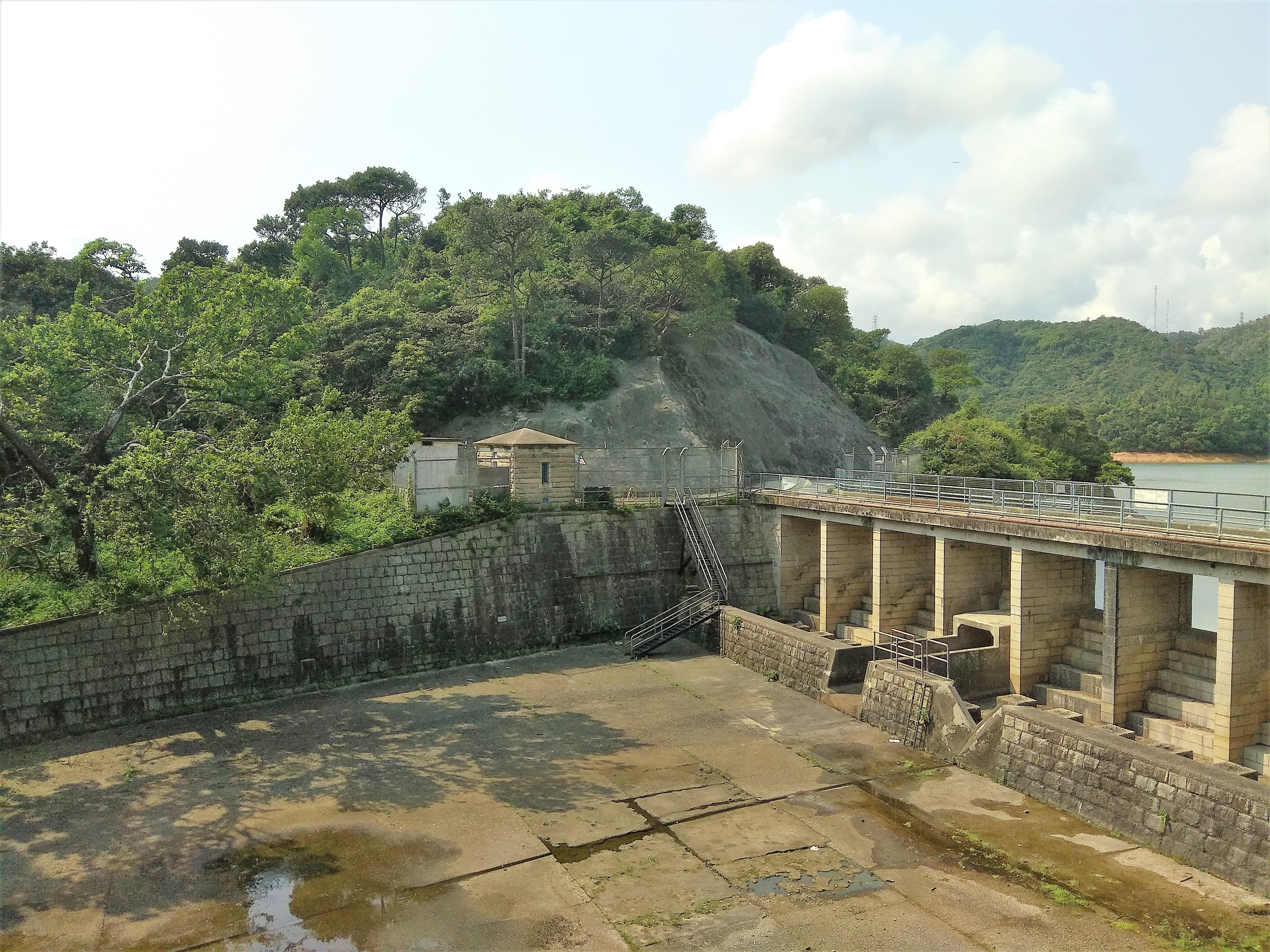
Golden Hill Road (金山路) passes on the top of Kowloon Reservoir Spillway Dam (right). Kowloon Reservoir Spillway Dam Recorder House is visible in the center.

The Kowloon Group of Reservoirs is located in the Kam Shan Country Park, north of Kowloon, Hong Kong. They include:

- Kowloon Reservoir 22°21′14″N 114°09′12″E
- Kowloon Byewash Reservoir 22°21′02″N 114°09′05″E
- Kowloon Reception Reservoir (Eption Reservoir)22°21′03″N 114°08′44″E

Also located in the Kam Shan Country Park is the Shek Lei Pui Reservoir. Taken together the capacity of the reservoirs is 2.9 million cubic metres (770,000,000 US gal)

== History ==
The Kowloon Reservoir was the first of the group to be built. Construction commenced in 1907 and it was completed in 1910, making it the first reservoir in the New Territories. On completion, the capacity was 1.42 million cubic metres (380,000,000 US gal) with the total cost of construction coming in at $619,000.

The Shek Lei Pui Reservoir was completed in 1925 with a capacity of 440,000 cubic metres (120,000,000 US gal).

The Kowloon Reception Reservoir was completed in 1926.

The Kowloon Byewash Reservoir was completed in 1931 with a capacity of 700,000 cubic metres (180,000,000 US gal).

Construction of a water tunnel connecting the Kowloon Byewash Reservoir to the Lower Shing Mun Reservoir started in 2019 and was completed in 2022. The Inter-reservoirs Transfer Scheme (IRTS) consists mainly of a water tunnel, 2.8 kilometres (1.7 mi) in length and 3 metres (9.8 ft) in diameter, connecting the two reservoirs. The purpose of the tunnel is to reduce the quantity of the overflow from the Kowloon Group of Reservoirs into the Lai Chi Kok Transfer Scheme (LCKTS) and to make better use of the water collected by the Kowloon Group of Reservoirs which will otherwise overflow into the Butterfly Valley and discharge into the sea.

== Conservation ==
5 Historic Structures of Kowloon Reservoir have been declared as monuments. They are:

- Main Dam (1901-1910)
- Main Dam Valve House (1901-1910)
- Spillway Dam (1901-1910)
- Spillway Dam Recorder House (1901-1910)
- Recorder House (1901-1910)

== See also ==
- List of reservoirs of Hong Kong
- Water supply and sanitation in Hong Kong
