= Amah Rock =

Rock formation in Hong Kong

- Rock formation
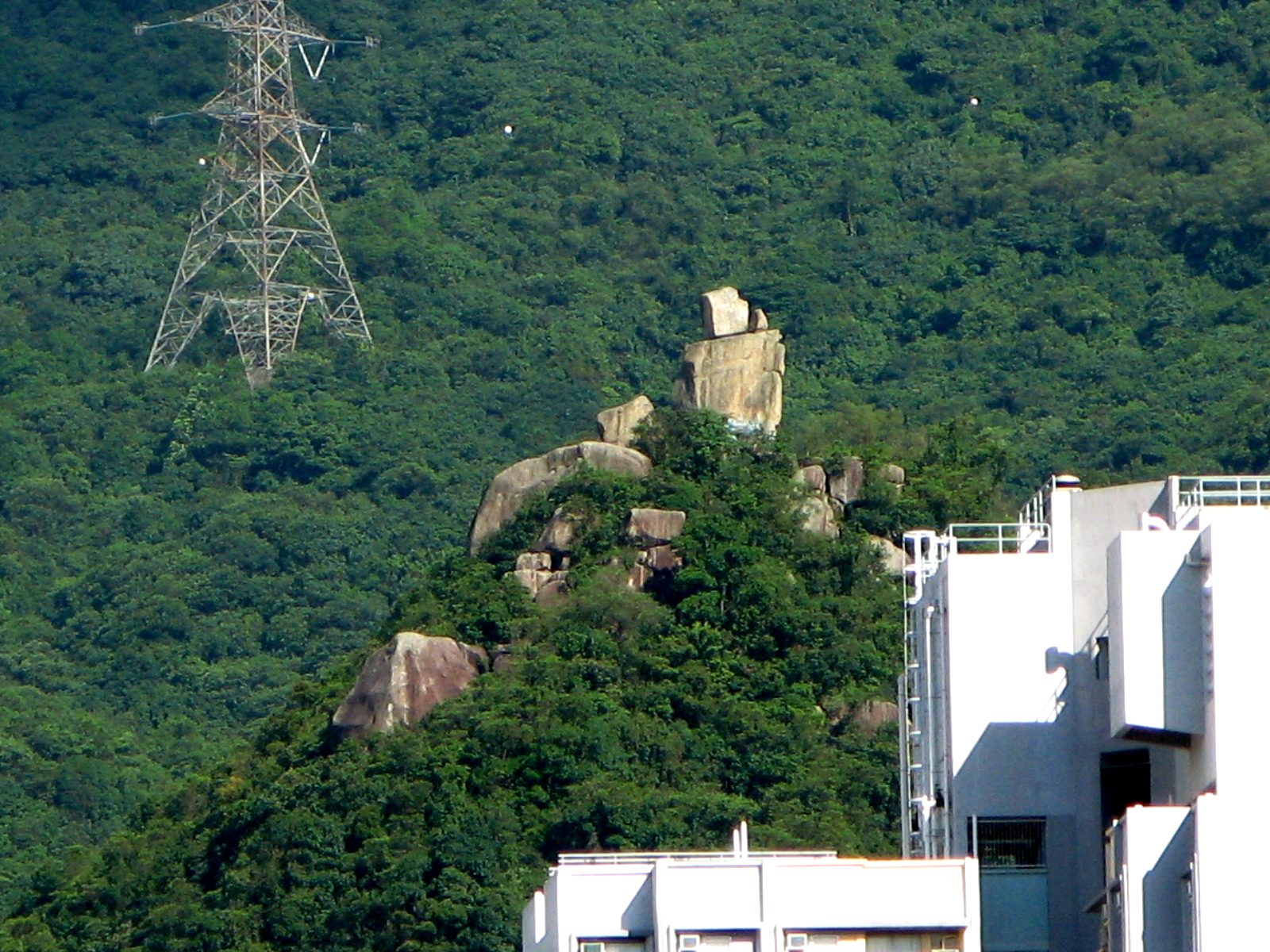

- Location in Hong Kong
- Interactive map of Amah Rock
- Coordinates: 22°21′34″N 114°10′47″E
- Location: Sha Tin District, New Territories, Hong Kong
- Age: Mesozoic
- Geology: Granite
- Elevation: 250 m (820 ft)

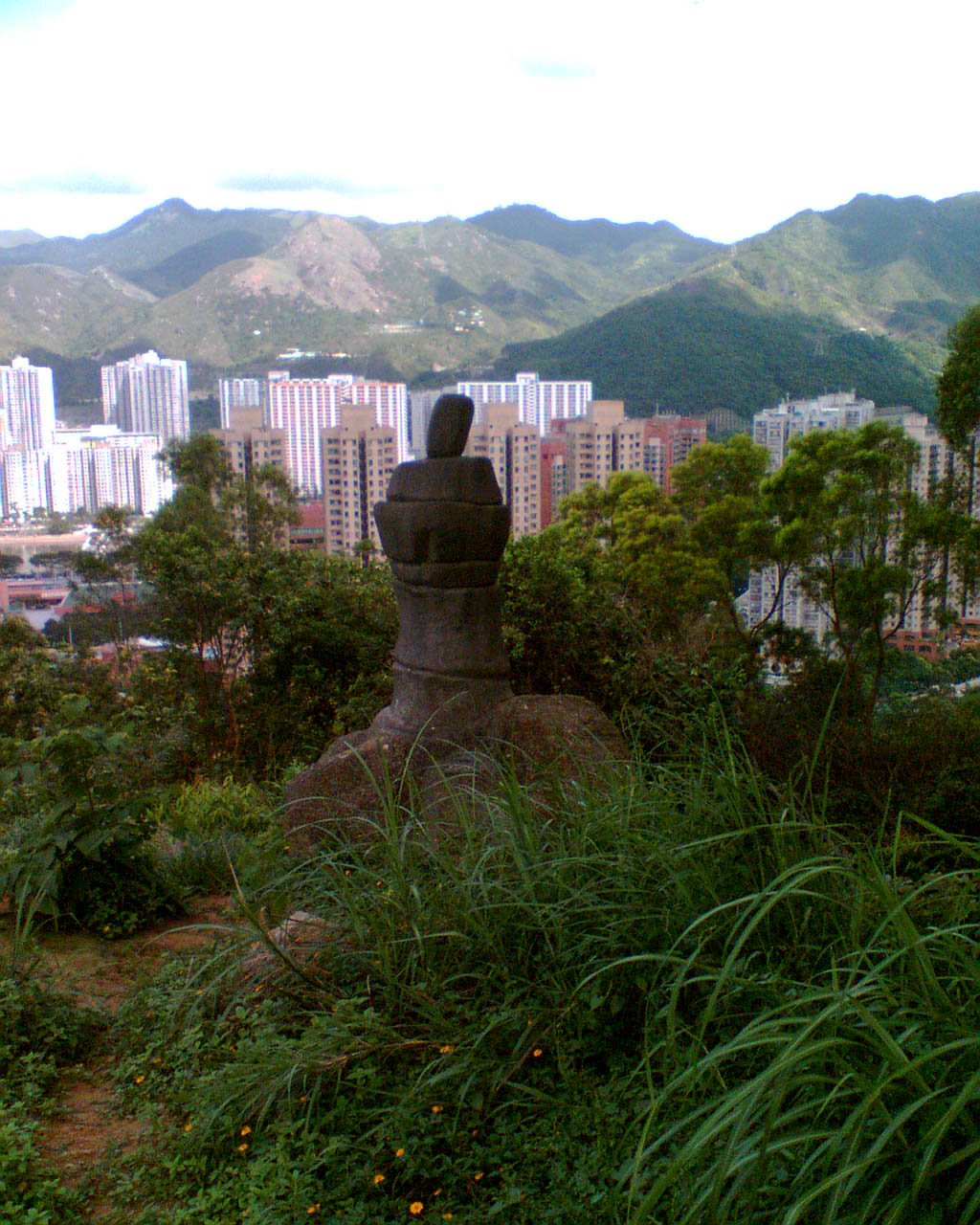
The replica of Amah Rock at Tao Fung Shan

Amah Rock (Chinese: 望夫石, Mong Fu Shek, lit. "husband-watching stone") is a naturally shaped rock located on a hilltop in southwest Sha Tin District, Hong Kong.

== Description ==
The rock is approximately 15 meters in height, and is shaped much like a woman carrying a baby on her back. It stands above the entrance to the Lion Rock Tunnel, within Lion Rock Country Park.

== Legend ==
According to a legend, the faithful wife of a fisherman climbed the hills every day, carrying her son, to watch for the return of her husband, not knowing he had been drowned at sea. In reward for her faithfulness she was turned into a rock by the Goddess of the Sea so that her spirit could unite with that of her husband. Similar legends abound throughout the whole of China—the number of rocks called Mong Fu Shek in the country is high. Many Chinese classical poems were dedicated to this kind of rock.

== Attraction ==
The rock is a popular tourist destination; the whole Sha Tin District can be seen from there. It is also a place of worship for Chinese women and stands as a symbol of women's loyalty and faithfulness.

== See also ==
- Amah (occupation)
- Lion Rock
- Tao Fong Shan
- List of places in Hong Kong
