= Lower Shing Mun Reservoir =

- 下城門水塘 (Chinese)
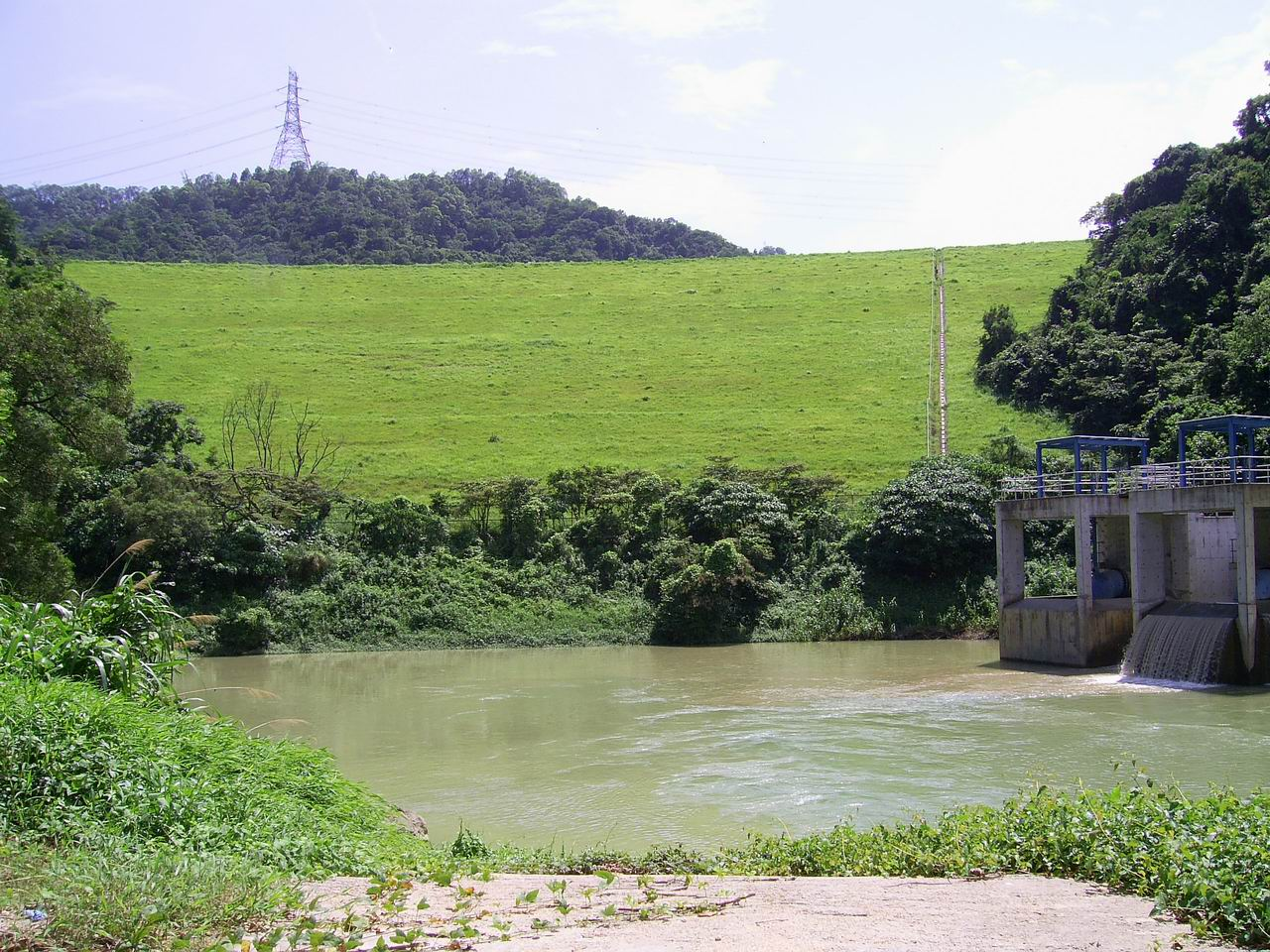
- Main dam and supply basin of Lower Shing Mun Reservoir

- Location within Hong Kong
- Location: Hong Kong
- Coordinates: 22.3730°N 114.1593°E
- Type: Reservoir
- Built: 1965; 61 years ago
- Water volume: 17,580,000 cubic metres (621,000,000 cu ft)

Lower Shing Mun Reservoir
- Traditional Chinese: 下城門水塘
- Simplified Chinese: 下城门水塘
Transcriptions
Standard Mandarin
- Hanyu Pinyin: Xià Chéngmén Shuǐtáng
Yue: Cantonese
- Yale Romanization: Haah sìhng mùhn séui tòhng
- Jyutping: Haa6 sing4 mun4 soei2 tong4

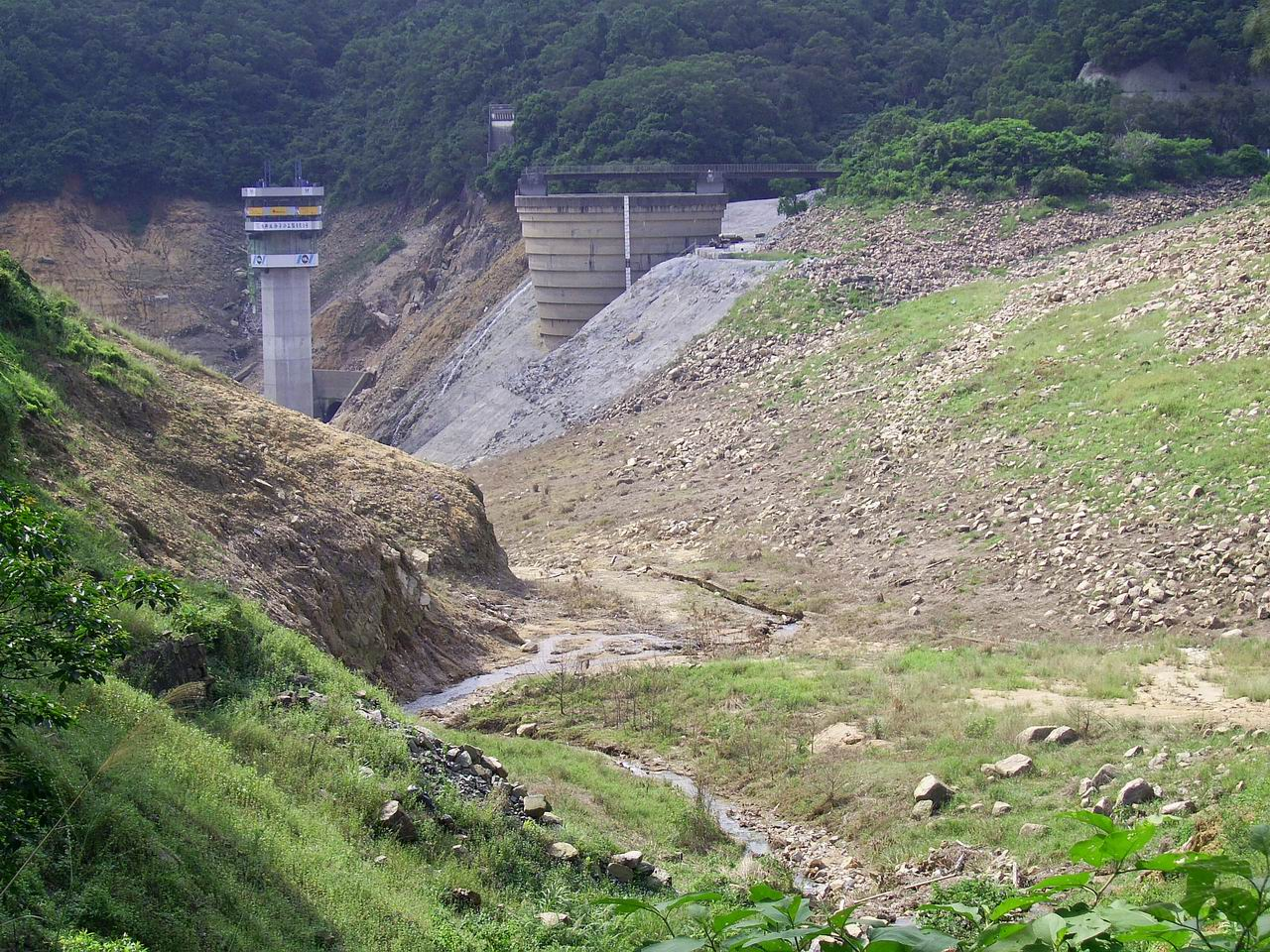
Drain reservoir of Lower Shing Mun Reservoir

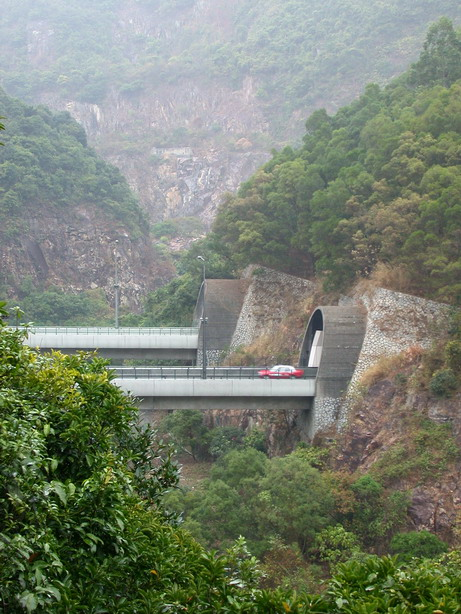
Bridges of Shing Mun Tunnel connecting between Shing Mun Reservoir and Lower Shing Mun Reservoir

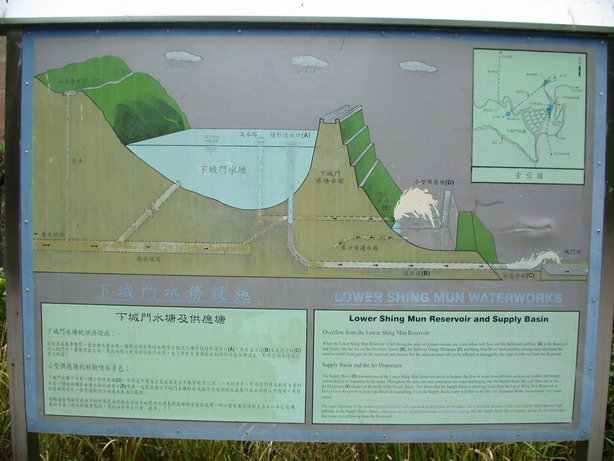
A map of the Lower Shing Mun Reservoir

Lower Shing Mun Reservoir is a reservoir outside Shing Mun Country Park and the downstream of the dam of the Shing Mun Reservoir in the Sha Tin District of Hong Kong. Two vehicular bridges span over the valley between the Shing Mun Reservoir and the Lower Shing Mun Reservoir. They are viaducts connecting the tunnels on their respective ends which together form the Shing Mun Tunnel road scheme.

Lower Shing Mun Reservoir was commissioned in 1965 and was a part of the "Plover Cove Reservoir Scheme". Shing Mun Reservoir and Lower Shing Mun Reservoir have a total storage capacity of 17.58 million cubic metres.

Construction of a water tunnel connecting the Kowloon Byewash Reservoir to the Lower Shing Mun Reservoir started in 2019. The project is scheduled to be completed in 2022. The Inter-reservoirs Transfer Scheme (IRTS) consists mainly of a water tunnel, 2.8 km in length and 3 m in diameter, connecting the two reservoirs. The purpose of the tunnel is to reduce the quantity of the overflow from the Kowloon Group of Reservoirs into the Lai Chi Kok Transfer Scheme (LCKTS) and to make better use of the water collected by the Kowloon Group of Reservoirs which will otherwise overflow into the Butterfly Valley and discharge into the sea.

== See also ==
- Shing Mun Reservoir
- Shing Mun Country Park
- Shing Mun Tunnels
