= Shing Mun Tunnels =

Road tunnels in New Territories, Hong Kong

Coordinates: 22.3788°N 114.1587°E

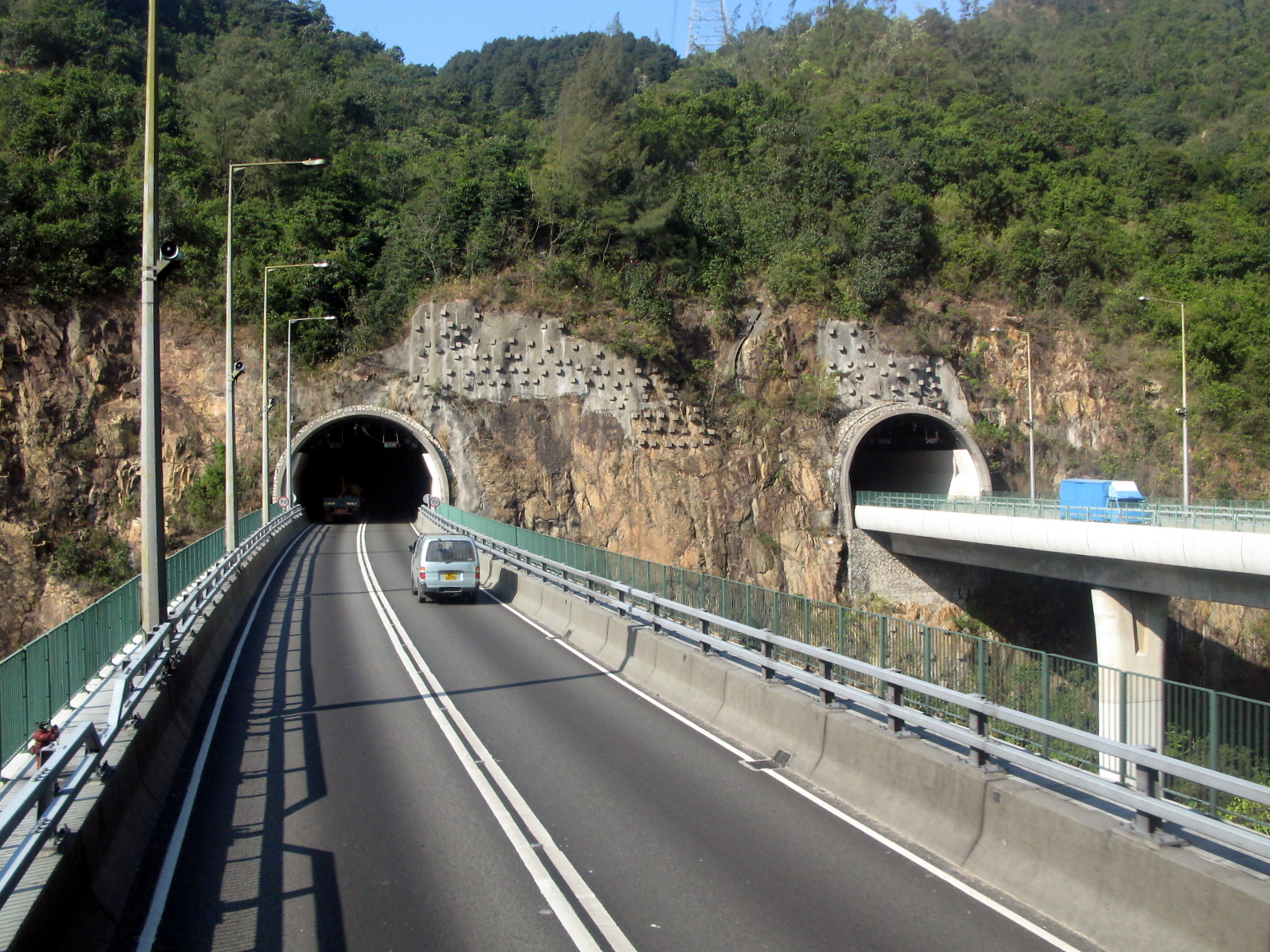
- Bridges over the valley of Lower Shing Mun Reservoir in January 2008
- Interactive map of Shing Mun Tunnels

Overview
- Status: Active
- System: Part of Route 9
- Start: Tsuen Wan
- End: Sha Tin

Operation
- Opened: 20 April 1990; 36 years ago
- Owner: Hong Kong Government
- Operator: Greater Lucky (H.K.) Company Limited
- Traffic: Vehicular

Technical
- Line length: 5.9 km (3.7 mi)
- No. of lanes: 4 lanes (2 lanes per direction)
- Operating speed: 70 km/h (45 mph)

Shing Mun Tunnels
- Traditional Chinese: 城門隧道
- Simplified Chinese: 城门隧道
Transcriptions
Standard Mandarin
- Hanyu Pinyin: Chéngmén Suìdào
Yue: Cantonese
- Yale Romanization: sìhng mùhn seuih douh
- Jyutping: sing4 mun4 seoi6 dou6

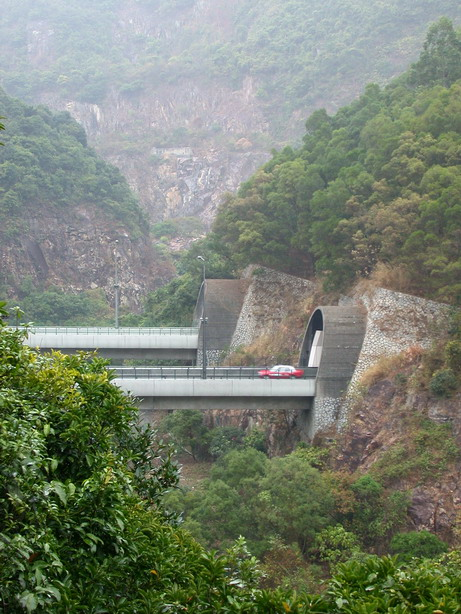
A red taxicab exiting one of the Shing Mun Tunnels in January 2005

The Shing Mun Tunnels are a system of tunnels and viaducts in the New Territories, Hong Kong connecting the new towns of Tsuen Wan to the west and Sha Tin to the east. They are a part of Route 9 and the Tsuen Wan entrance is the reset point (as Route 9 is apparently a loop) of Route 9.

Construction started on 11 February 1987 and the tunnels opened on 20 April 1990. They are made up of three sections, each with twin two-lane tunnels (one each way). The westerly pair passes through Smuggler's Ridge near Shing Mun Reservoir, where it gets its name from; the easterly pair passes through Needle Hill and is linked to the westerly pair by two viaducts over Lower Shing Mun Reservoir. The toll plaza and bus interchange are located outside the Tsuen Wan end of the tunnel.

The tunnels lead to Cheung Pei Shan Road and connect Wo Yi Hop Interchange in Tsuen Wan, and Shing Mun Tunnel Road in the east which links Tai Wai Road and ends at Tai Po Road.

The Shing Mun Tunnels are currently managed by Greater Lucky (H.K.) Company Limited.

== History ==
The Shing Mun Tunnels were formally named as such on 19 May 1987, when the name was approved by the Sha Tin District Board. The tunnels were formally inaugurated by Governor David Wilson on 19 April 1990.

The Hong Kong Government awarded a number of contracts for the construction work, including one awarded to Philips Hong Kong Ltd. Philips' completion of the work was delayed, incurring damages due to the government. The wording of the contract in relation to liquidated damages was addressed in various courts and the interpretation of the wording was ultimately addressed by the Privy Council of the United Kingdom, who ruled in favour of the government. This ruling was one of the last Hong Kong legal cases addressed by the Privy Council before the handover of Hong Kong to China in 1997.

== See also ==
- Route 9
- List of tunnels and bridges in Hong Kong
- Shing Mun Tunnels Bus Interchange

Preceded by Cheung Pei Shan Road	Hong Kong Route 9 Shing Mun Tunnels	Succeeded by Tai Po Road – Sha Tin
