= Kowloon Reservoir =

Reservoir in New Territories, Hong Kong

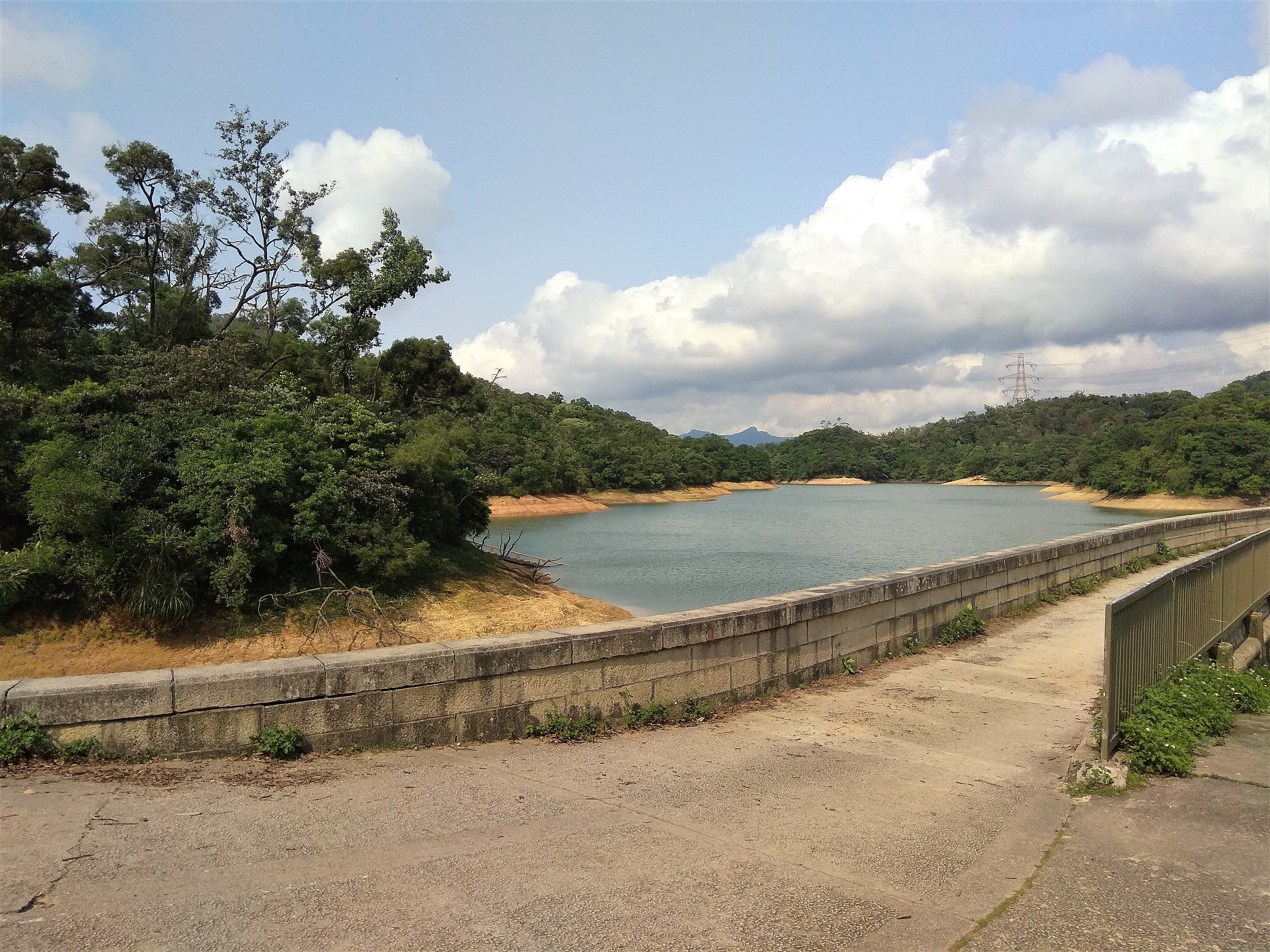
- Kowloon Reservoir viewed from the main dam

- Location within Hong Kong
- Location: Kam Shan Country Park, Sha Tin, New Territories, Hong Kong
- Coordinates: 22°21′14″N 114°09′12″E
- Lake type: reservoir
- Built: 1906; 120 years ago
- Water volume: 1,578,000 cubic metres (55,700,000 cu ft)

Kowloon Reservoir
- Traditional Chinese: 九龍水塘
- Simplified Chinese: 九龙水塘
- Literal meaning: Nine Dragons Reservoir
Transcriptions
Standard Mandarin
- Hanyu Pinyin: Jiǔ lóng shuǐ táng
Hakka
- Romanization: Geo2 Lung4 Sêü2 Tong4
Yue: Cantonese
- Yale Romanization: Gáu lùhng séui tòhng
- Jyutping: Gau2 lung4 seoi2 tong4

Kowloon Reservoir, part of the Kowloon Group of Reservoirs, is a reservoir in Sha Tin District, Hong Kong, located within the Kam Shan Country Park. The total water storage capacity is 353 million gallons and the total cost of construction was $619,000.

== History ==
=== Establishment ===
In 1898, the British took over the New Territories and New Kowloon and the Public Works Department immediately sent engineering teams to explore water sources. However, the team found suitable valleys to build reservoirs in the west of Beacon Hill and south of Needle Hill. Construction for Kowloon Reservoir commenced in 1901 and it was completed in 1910, making it the first reservoir in the New Territories.

=== Further expansion ===
Expansion of the Kowloon Reservoir began in 1922. It aimed to expand the filtration plant in order to have a daily output of 3.58 million gallons of water; enlarge the catchment area; and improve the dams’ walls. After the expansion, the Kowloon Reservoir provided 1.5 million gallons of water to the locals daily.

=== Effect on locals ===
The completion of the Kowloon Reservoir reduced the locals’ dependence on getting water from wells. The locals got water from the reservoir. This led to the decline of the Yau Ma Tei Pumping Station.

== See also ==
- List of reservoirs of Hong Kong
- Kowloon Group of Reservoirs
- Kowloon Reception Reservoir
- Shek Lei Pui Reservoir
