= Water Supplies Department =

Government agency of Hong Kong

- 水務署

Department overview
- Formed: 1982; 44 years ago
- Preceding Department: Waterworks Office
- Jurisdiction: Hong Kong
- Headquarters: Immigration Tower, 7 Gloucester Road, Wan Chai, Hong Kong; 22.280157°N 114.172898°E
- Employees: 4,465 (March 2018)
- Annual budget: HK$8,404.0m (2018-19)
- Minister responsible: Michael Wong Wai-lun, Secretary for Development
- Deputy Minister responsible: Liu Chun-san, Under Secretary for Development
- Department executive: WONG Yan-lok, Roger, J.P., Director of Water Supplies
- Parent department: Development Bureau
- Key document: Waterworks Ordinance (Cap. 102)
- Website: Official website

Water Supplies Department
- Traditional Chinese: 水務署
- Simplified Chinese: 水务署
Transcriptions
Standard Mandarin
- Hanyu Pinyin: Shuǐwùshǔ
Yue: Cantonese
- Jyutping: seoi2 mou6 cyu5

The Water Supplies Department (WSD; Chinese: 水務署) is the department under the Development Bureau of the Government of Hong Kong of the People's Republic of China providing a reliable and adequate supply of wholesome potable water and sea water to customers in Hong Kong. The headquarter office is located at the Immigration Tower on Gloucester Road.

== Organisational structure ==
- Customer service branch
- Development branch
- Finance and information technology branch
- Mechanical and electrical branch
- New works branch
- Operations branch
- Contract advisory unit
- Public relations unit
- Departmental administration division
- General administration section

== See also ==
- Water supply and sanitation in Hong Kong
- Engineer's Office of the Former Pumping Station
- Argyle Street Waterworks Depot
