= Butterfly Valley =

Low point in western Kowloon, Hong Kong

- Location within Hong Kong

Geography
- Location: North of New Kowloon, Hong Kong
- Coordinates: 22°20′39″N 114°08′38″E
- Interactive map of Butterfly Valley

Butterfly Valley
- Chinese: 蝴蝶谷
- Literal meaning: Butterfly Valley
Transcriptions
Standard Mandarin
- Hanyu Pinyin: Hú Dié Gǔ
Hakka
- Romanization: Wu4 Dib2 Gug1
Yue: Cantonese
- Yale Romanization: wùh díp gūk
- Jyutping: Wu4 Dip2 Guk1

Butterfly Valley, or Wu Tip Kuk (Chinese: 蝴蝶谷), is a valley in north of Lai Chi Kok in New Kowloon of Hong Kong, located between O Pui Shan and Piper's Hill.

== Naming ==
On December 10, 1938, in company with some students of the Chung Hwa Middle School, I made another visit to this Valley (Butterfly Valley)…. We reached the Valley at about 10 a.m. and to my surprise thousands of butterflies were seen swarming on the twigs and branches of pine trees and other bushes.

— Konyil Chan, The Hong Kong Naturalist, Vol. 3 No. 3 (1939 April), p. 166.

The valley is named for the butterfly habitat that existed prior to the Japanese occupation of Hong Kong. The butterflies lived in a forest, which was destroyed as part of the Japanese military's efforts to obtain wood. This resulted in the extinction of the butterflies, despite later attempts to bring back the butterfly population.

== Geology ==
On the lower section of the valley, there is a demolished squatter town named Wai Man Tsuen (衛民村). The site is now part of Route 8 and now has an international school called Christian Alliance International School. The upper section of butterfly valley is part of a country park.

The Cheung Sha Wang Roman Catholic Cemetery and Yew Chung International School of Hong Kong are located on the side above Piper's Hill. Above O Pui Shan is the O Pui Shan Boy's Home.

A river used to run through Butterfly Valley. Its upper course was blocked to collect water for the Kowloon Reservoirs, while its lower course has become a covered nullah under Butterfly Valley Road on the border between Lai Chi Kok and Cheung Sha Wan.

Despite its proximity to Lai Chi Kok, a large part of valley belongs to Kwai Tsing District.
