= Kowloon Reception Reservoir =

Reservoir in New Territories, Hong Kong

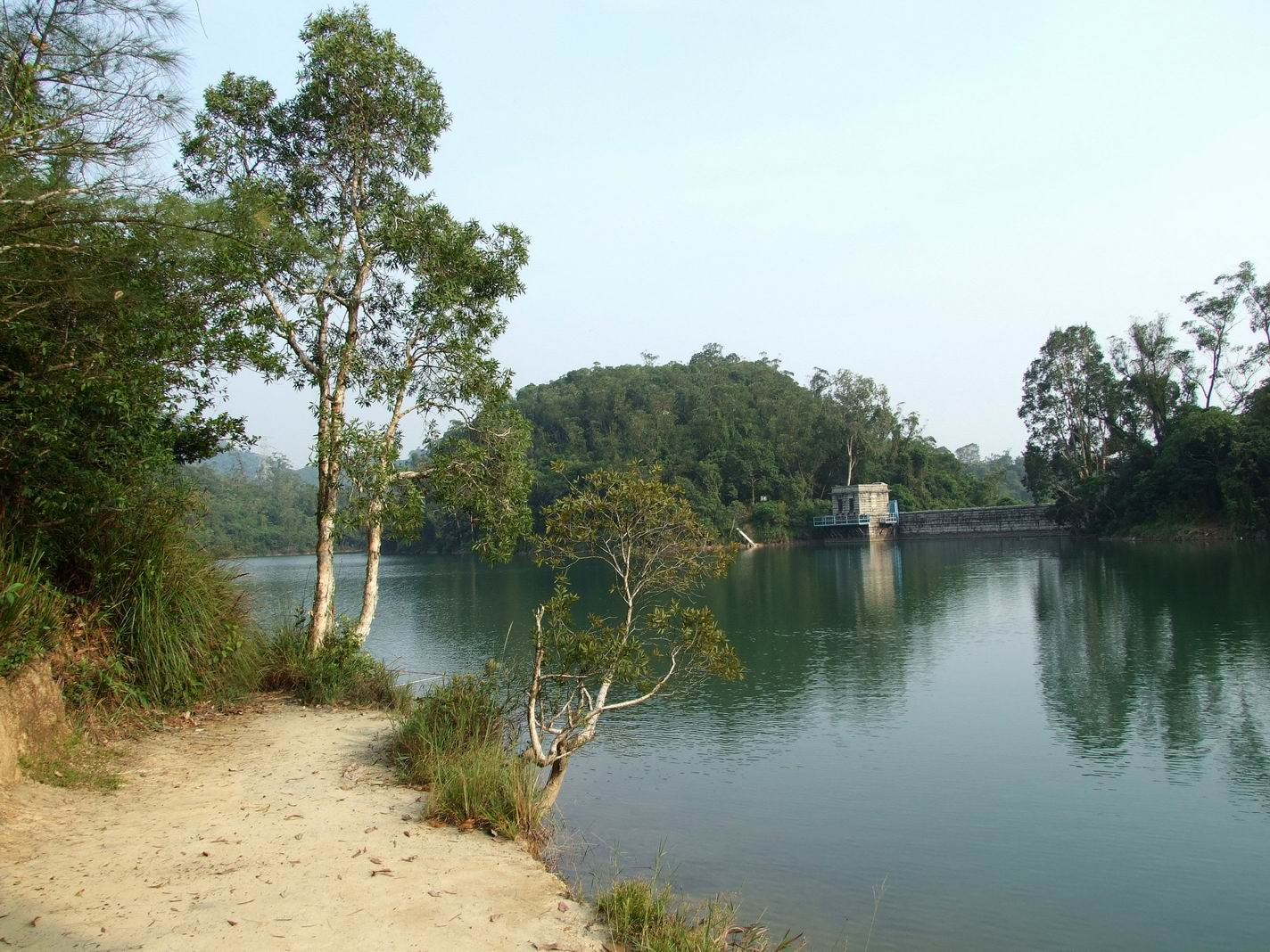
- Kowloon Reception Reservoir

- Location within Hong Kong
- Location: Kam Shan Country Park, Sha Tin, New Territories, Hong Kong
- Coordinates: 22.350886°N 114.145474°E
- Lake type: reservoir
- Built: 1926; 100 years ago
- Water volume: 121,000 cubic metres (4,300,000 cu ft)

Kowloon Reception Reservoir
- Traditional Chinese: 九龍接收水塘
Transcriptions
Standard Mandarin
- Hanyu Pinyin: Jiǔ lóng jiē shōu shuǐ táng
Yue: Cantonese
- Yale Romanization: Gáu lùhng jip sāu séui tòhng
- Jyutping: Gau2 lung4 zip3 sau1 seoi2 tong4

Kowloon Reception Reservoir, part of the Kowloon Group of Reservoirs, is a reservoir in Kam Shan Country Park, Sha Tin, New Territories, Hong Kong.

The Kowloon Reception Reservoir Jogging Trail, a circular route measuring 1.6 km long, surrounds the reservoir.

Its dam and the valve house built at the centre of the dam are listed as Grade I historic buildings.

== History ==
Originally known as Eption Reservoir, it was built in 1926 to receive the fresh water from Shing Mun Reservoir and then sent to the Shek Lei Pui Water Treatment Works for filtration.

== See also ==
- List of reservoirs of Hong Kong
- Kowloon Group of Reservoirs
- Kowloon Reservoir
- Shek Lei Pui Reservoir
