= Shek Lei Pui Reservoir =

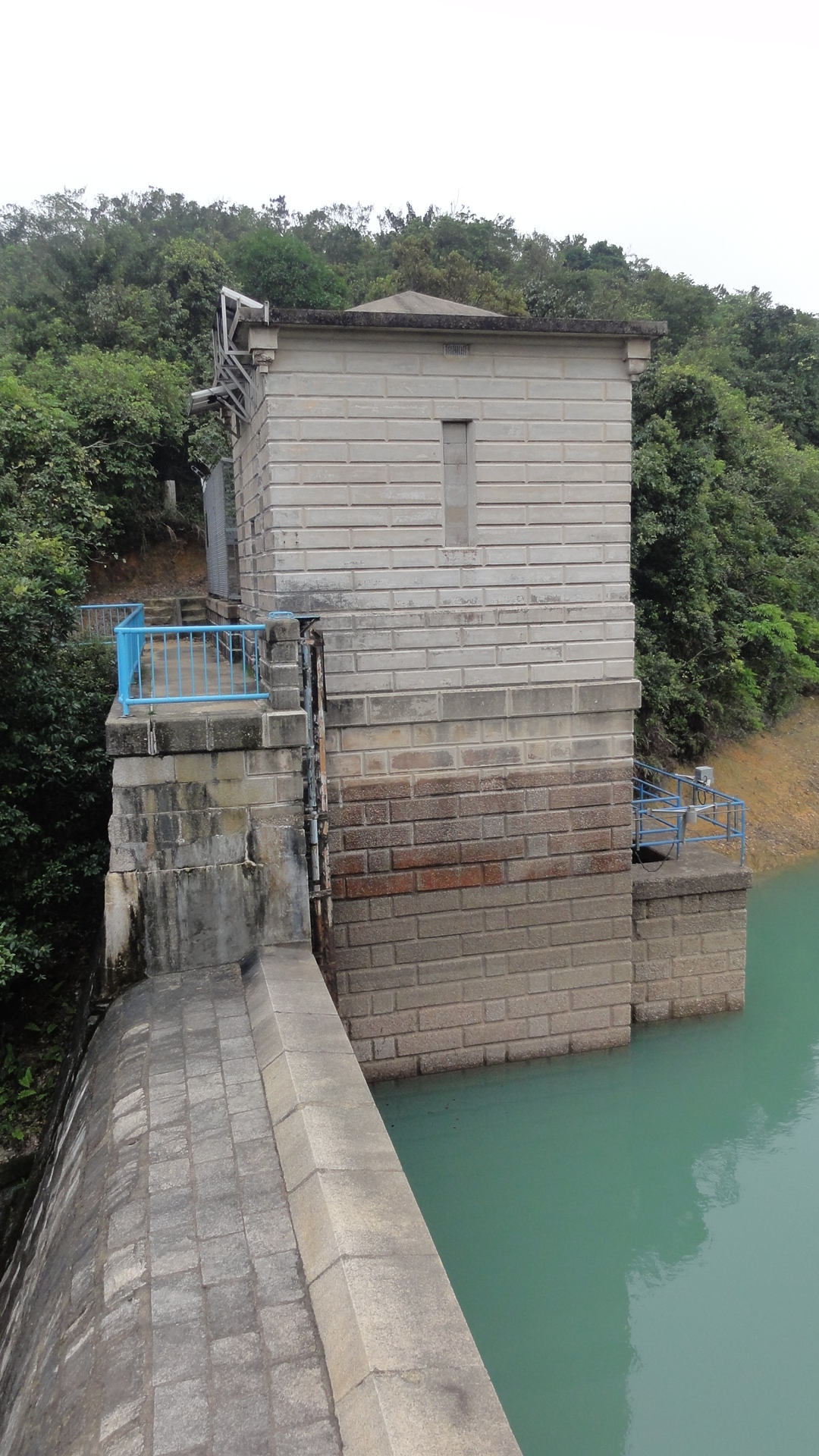
- Dam of Shek Lei Pui Reservoir

- Location within Hong Kong
- Location: Kam Shan Country Park, Sha Tin, New Territories, Hong Kong
- Coordinates: 22.35563°N 114.14816°E
- Lake type: reservoir

Shek Lei Pui Reservoir
- Traditional Chinese: 石梨貝水塘
Transcriptions
Standard Mandarin
- Hanyu Pinyin: Shí lí bèi shuǐ táng
Yue: Cantonese
- Yale Romanization: Sehk lèih bui séui tòhng
- Jyutping: Sek6 lei4 bui3 seoi2 tong4

Shek Lei Pui Reservoir is a reservoir in Kam Shan Country Park, Sha Tin, New Territories, Hong Kong. It is part of the Kowloon Group of Reservoirs. The total water storage capacity is 116 million gallons.

Formerly the site of Shek Lei Pui Village, the construction works of the reservoir began in 1923 and completed in 1925. Most of the villages were resettled in Hin Tin, a new village in Tai Wai, and the others to Kwai Chung.

Its two dams and the valve house built at the centre of the dam are listed as Grade II historic buildings.

The daily exercise routine of Luk Tung Kuen was started by Master Ha Kinh at this reservoir in 1963.

== See also ==
- List of reservoirs of Hong Kong
- Kowloon Group of Reservoirs
- Kowloon Reservoir
- Kowloon Reception Reservoir
