= Shing Mun Country Park =

Country park in Hong Kong

- Traditional Chinese: 城門郊野公園
- Simplified Chinese: 城门郊野公园
Transcriptions
Standard Mandarin
- Hanyu Pinyin: Chéngmén Jiāoyě Gōngyuán
Yue: Cantonese
- Jyutping: Sing4 mun4 gaau1 je5 gung1 jyun4*2

The Shing Mun Country Park (established 24 June 1977) is a country park of Hong Kong, hugging the Shing Mun Reservoir.

== Location ==
Located in the central New Territories, it covers a total of 14 square kilometres (5.4 sq mi). It extends from Lead Mine Pass in the north, to the Shing Mun catchwater road in the south, and from Tai Mo Shan in the west to Grassy Hill and Needle Hill in the east.

== History ==
As early as 1971, a "pilot scheme" was initiated and prototype picnic facilities were provided, using funds from Sir David Trench Fund for Recreation. These were well received by visitors. In 1977, the area was formally designated as a country park.

== Vegetation ==
At the head of the reservoir near the former Tai Wai Village,^{note1} a "fung shui" grove contains a rich variety of more than 70 species of trees. It has been designated as a "special area" that merits special protection. To the west of the reservoir, both sides of the stream known as Tai Shing Shek Kan are covered with a rich variety of shrubs, grasses and trees, including several species of Camellia, Camellia granthamiana, which bears beautiful white flowers more than 12 cm in diameter, is a rare species found only a few decades ago. It is named after a former Hong Kong Governor, Sir Alexander Grantham.

During the Japanese occupation of Hong Kong in World War II, most of the trees in the park were cut down. Extensive reforestation was carried out after the war. The main species was Pinus massoniana, whilst Pinus elliottii, Lophostemon confertus, Melaleuca quinquenervia and Acacia confusa were introduced later. The area has now become one of the major forest plantations in Hong Kong.

== Wildlife ==
As the park is situated close to the densely populated urban area of Tsuen Wan, wildlife is seldom seen. Apart from a few common birds, other animals such as squirrels, barking deer, wild boars and pangolins may occasionally be discovered. Some monkeys, believed to have migrated from nearby Kam Shan Country Park, can sometimes be found along the forest tracks.

== Geology ==
The land in this area is composed of granitic and volcanic rocks. The latter form the highest ground, while the granitic rocks, which weather relatively easily, form the lower areas in the southern parts of the park. To the east of the park is a rich deposit of wolfram which was first mined in 1936. Mining was interrupted during World War II. With the high post-war prices, mining was resumed in 1951 and continued until 1968 when the prices again fell drastically. The highest average monthly output in the latter period was 30 tonnes, and was entirely for export. There are several abandoned lead mine workings around Lead Mine Pass, some of which date back several centuries.

== Features ==
=== Shing Mun Country Park Visitor Centre ===
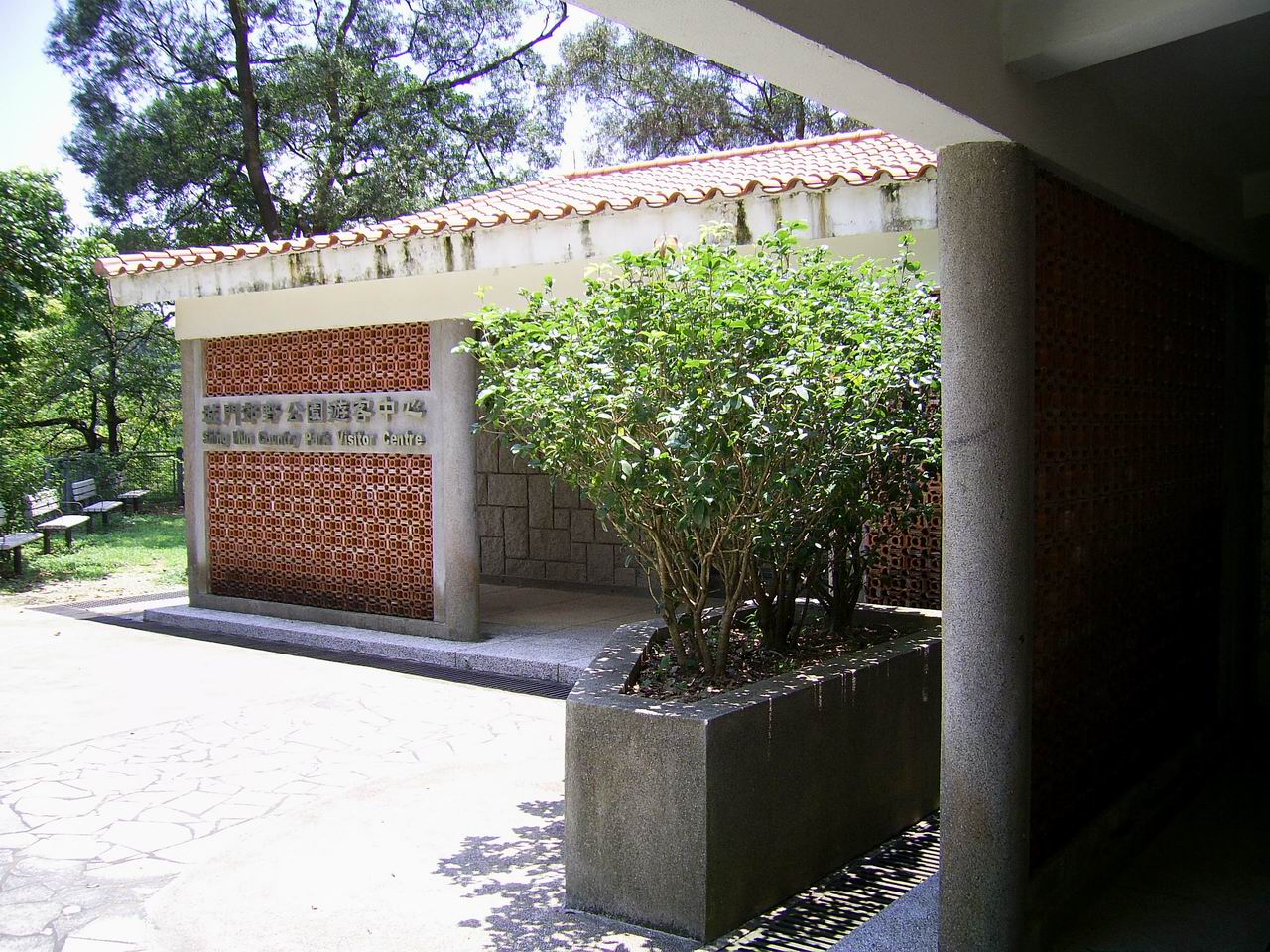
Shing Mun Country Park Visitor Centre.

The Shing Mun Country Park Visitor Centre, is situated near the maxicab terminus. 22°23′05″N 114°08′37″E It provides displays on the origin and history of Shing Mun, the reservoir and the mining industry in the early 20th centuries. Animals and mineral specimens are also on display. Video programmes on Country Parks and Countryside Conservation matters are shown in the visitor centre at regular intervals.

=== Shing Mun Arboretum ===
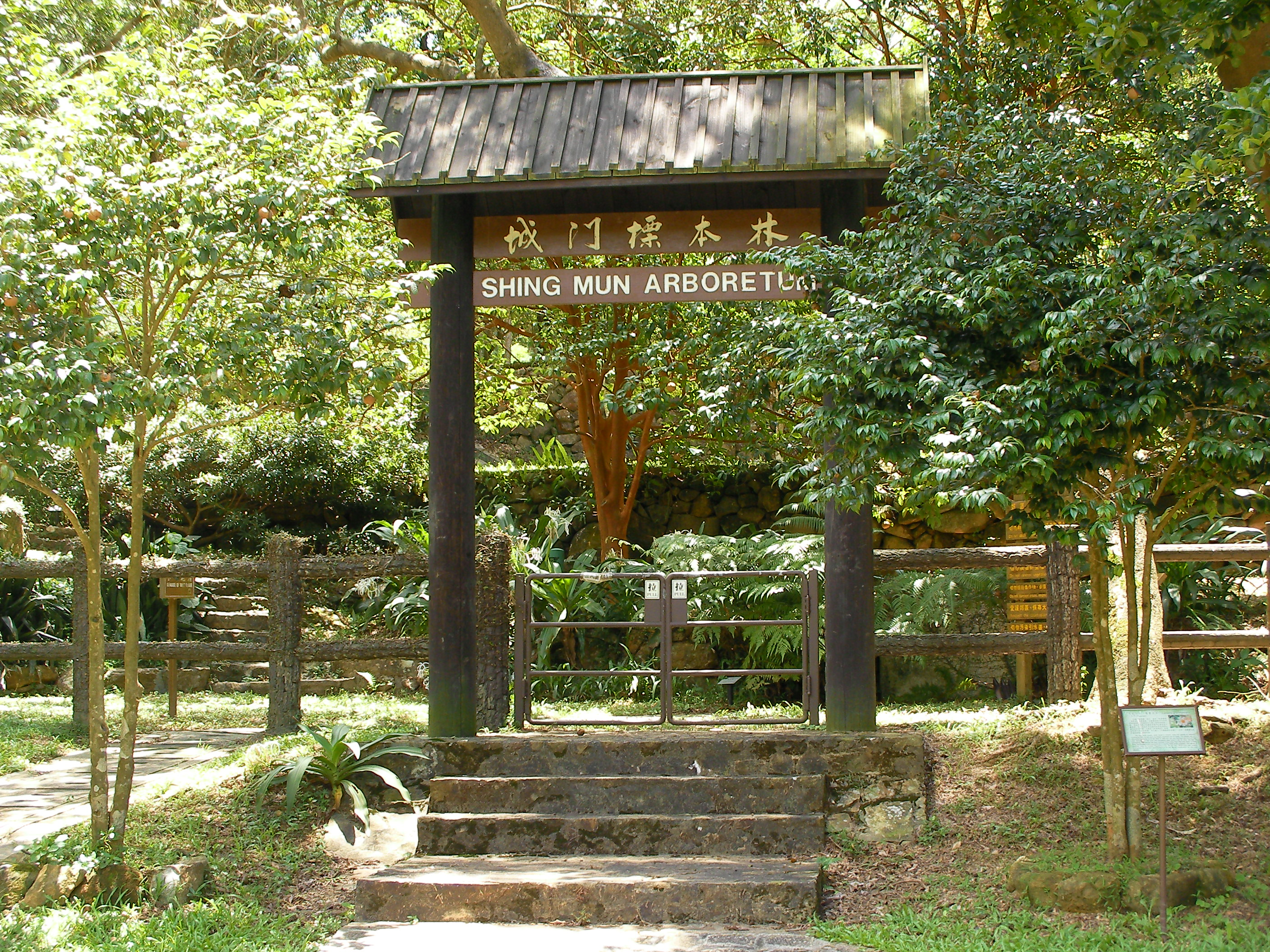
Entrance of Shing Mun Arboretum.

The Shing Mun Arboretum, occupies 4 hectares of land (40,000 square meters), is situated in the Country Park. It extends to Shing Mun Reservoir Road in the south. The western border lies in Tai Mo Shan, while Grassy Hill and Needle Hill mark the eastern margin.

==== History ====
The Shing Mun Arboretum was established in the 1970s. The land it was built upon were old terraced fields. Trees were planted there at around the same time. The Agriculture, Fisheries and Conservation Department has been expanding the Arboretum by planting diverse species of valuable, rare and endangered plants. The arboretum also contains many native plants through the department’s efforts.

==== Specimens ====
There are 7000 plants, belonging to over 300 species (which are native to Hong Kong or Southern China) in the Arboretum. The plants include a collection of bamboos, protected plant species, plants named after Botanists, plants first discovered in Hong Kong and Camellias (example include Grantham’s camellia), etc.

The Shi

=== Other facilities ===
At the park entrance a large information board and a direction post have been erected, providing visitors with information and guidance. Barbecue facilities are provided throughout the areas to the south and south-east of the reservoir, near the dams. Toilets, a refreshment kiosk, rain-shelters, warden posts, jogging trails, a nature trail, viewcompasses and many other facilities are also provided. Sections 7 and 8 of the MacLehose Trail run through the Park from Smugglers' Ridge in the south-east of the park to Route Twisk in the west. A campsite is provided near Lead Mine Pass for trail hikers.

== Transport ==
Visitors are advised to use public transport, as there is no parking space in the park. The Transport Department also prohibits coaches and private buses from using the Shing Mun Road leading to the park because of the narrowness of the road. Minibus 82 runs between Shiu Wo Street (HairTrend), Tsuen Wan and Shing Mun Reservoir.

== See also ==
- Geography of Hong Kong
- Environment of Hong Kong
- Hong Kong Country Parks & Special Areas
- List of buildings, sites and areas in Hong Kong

== Notes ==
- Note1: Not to be confused with the still extant Tai Wai Village. Shing Mun Tai Wai was the largest of the villages removed in 1928-1931 for the Shing Mun Water Supply Scheme.
