= Golden Hill, Hong Kong =

Hill in Hong Kong

Golden Hill
- 金山
- Location within Hong Kong

Highest point
- Elevation: 369 m (1,211 ft)
- Coordinates: 22.365°N 114.147°E

Geography
- Location: Sha Tin, Hong Kong

Golden Hill (Chinese: 金山), also known as Kam Shan, is a 369 metres (1,211 ft) tall mountain located in Hong Kong's New Territories.

== Location ==
Golden Hill is located inside Kam Shan Country Park.

== Wildlife ==
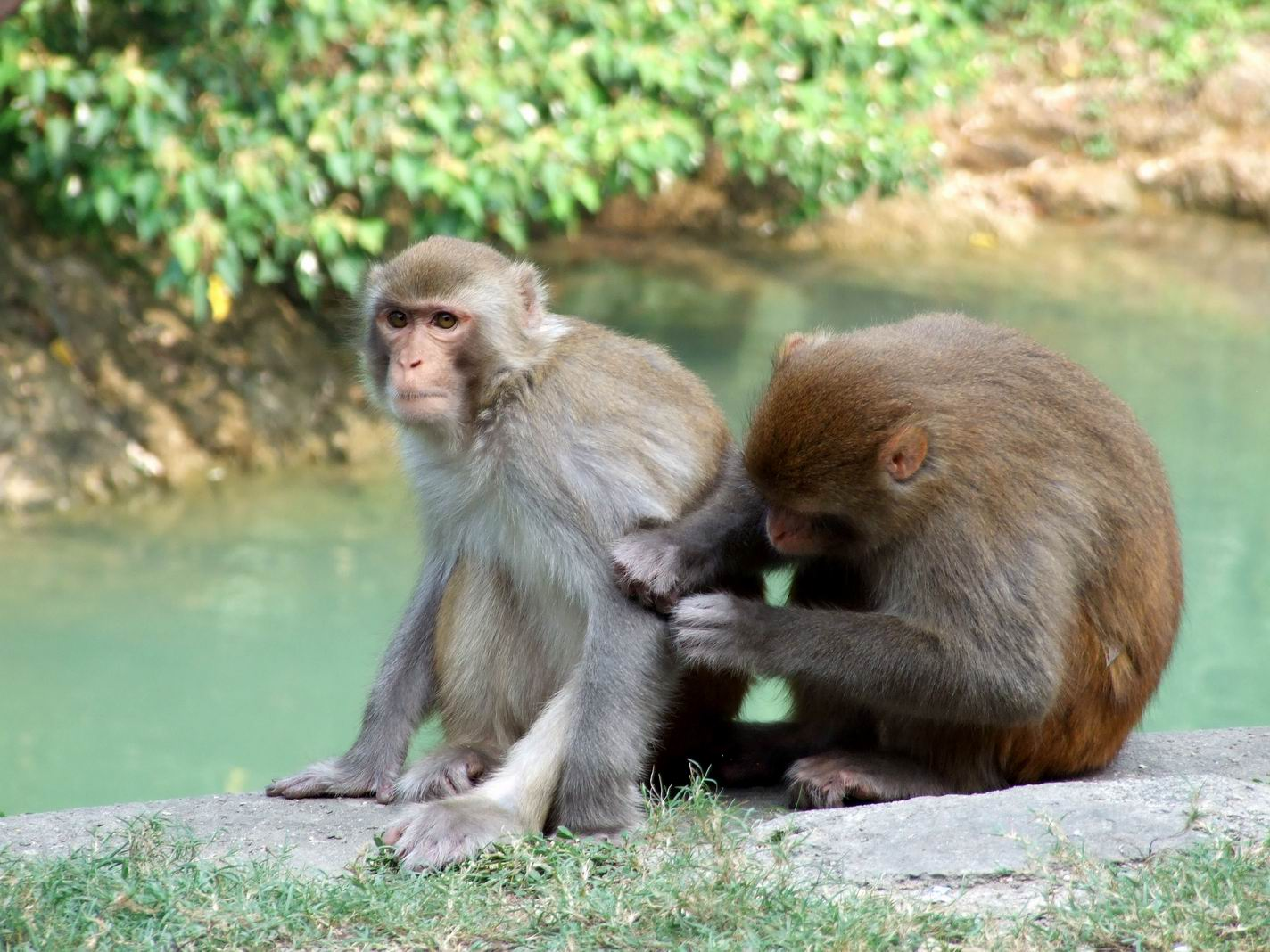
Macaques near Golden Hill

Golden Hill and surrounding areas are home to a large number of macaques. As a result, locals call this mountain "Monkey Hill".

== See also ==
- List of mountains, peaks and hills in Hong Kong
