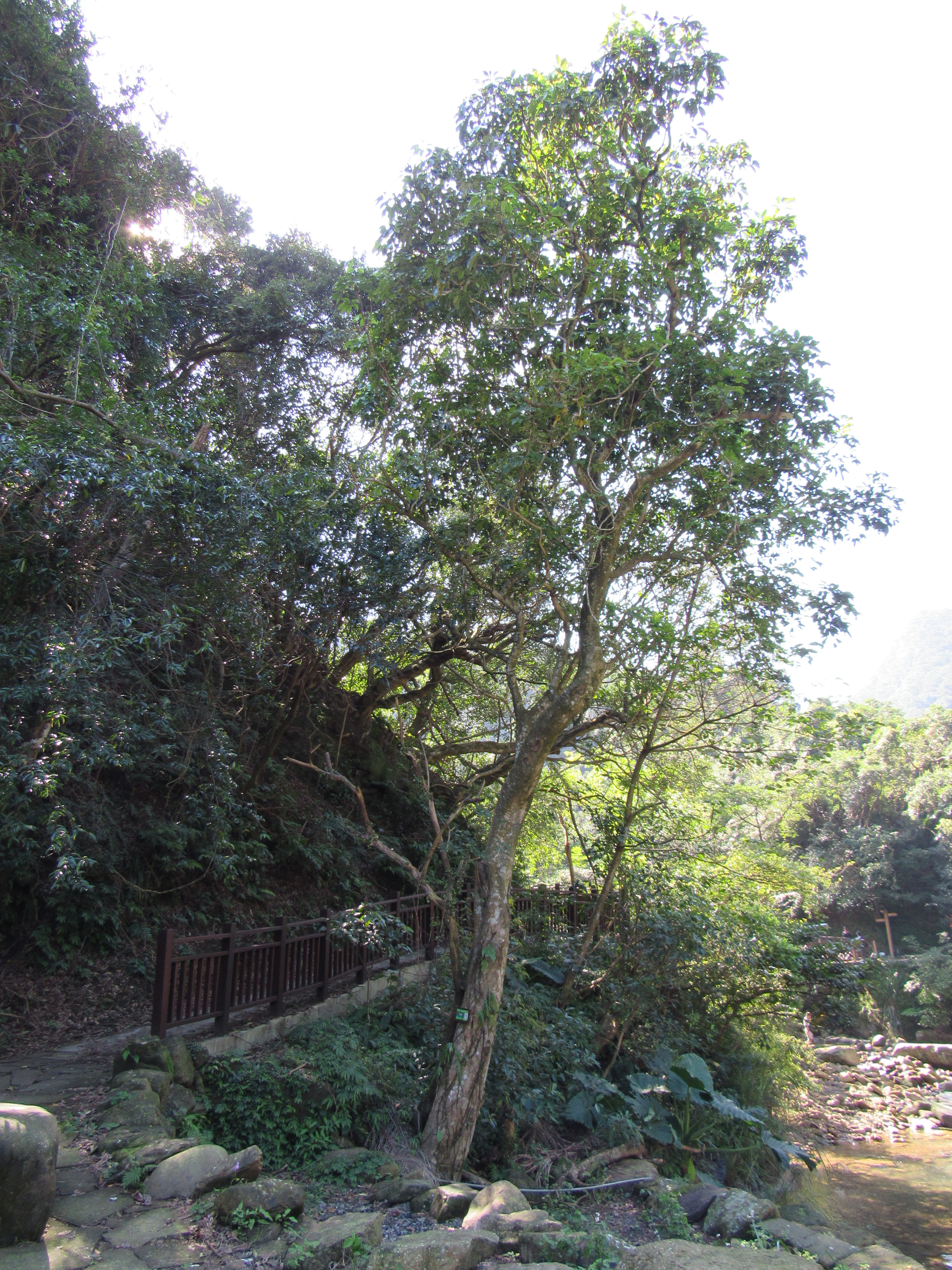

Scientific classification
- Kingdom: Plantae
- Clade: Tracheophytes
- Clade: Angiosperms
- Clade: Eudicots
- Clade: Asterids
- Order: Apiales
- Family: Araliaceae
- Genus: Heptapleurum
- Species: H. heptaphyllum

Binomial name
- Heptapleurum heptaphyllum (L.) Y.F.Deng

Synonyms
- Agalma lutchuense Nakai; Agalma octophyllum (Lour.) Seem.; Ampelopsis heptaphylla (L.) Schult.; Aralia heptaphylla (L.) Willd. ex Spreng.; Aralia octonata Stokes; Aralia octophylla Lour.; Heptapleurum octophyllum (Lour.) Benth. ex Hance; Heptapleurum rubriflorum (C.J.Tseng & G.Hoo) Y.F.Deng; Paratropia cantoniensis Hook. & Arn.; Schefflera atrifoliata R.H.Miao; Schefflera choganhensis Harms; Schefflera heptaphylla (L.) Frodin; Schefflera octophylla (Lour.) Harms; Schefflera rubriflora C.J.Tseng & G.Hoo; Sciodaphyllum heptaphyllum (L.) C.L.Hitchc.; Vitis heptaphylla L.

= Heptapleurum heptaphyllum =

Species of plant

Heptapleurum heptaphyllum is a species of flowering plant in the family Araliaceae, native to southern China, Indo-China and Japan. It was first described by Carl Linnaeus in 1771 as Vitis heptaphylla.

Schefflera rubriflora was assessed as "critically endangered" in the 2004 IUCN Red List, where it was considered endemic to Yunnan in China, but as of January 2023 was treated as part of the much more widely distributed Heptapleurum heptaphyllum.
