= Kam Shan Country Park =

Country park in Kowloon, Hong Kong

Coordinates: 22°21′07″N 114°09′13″E

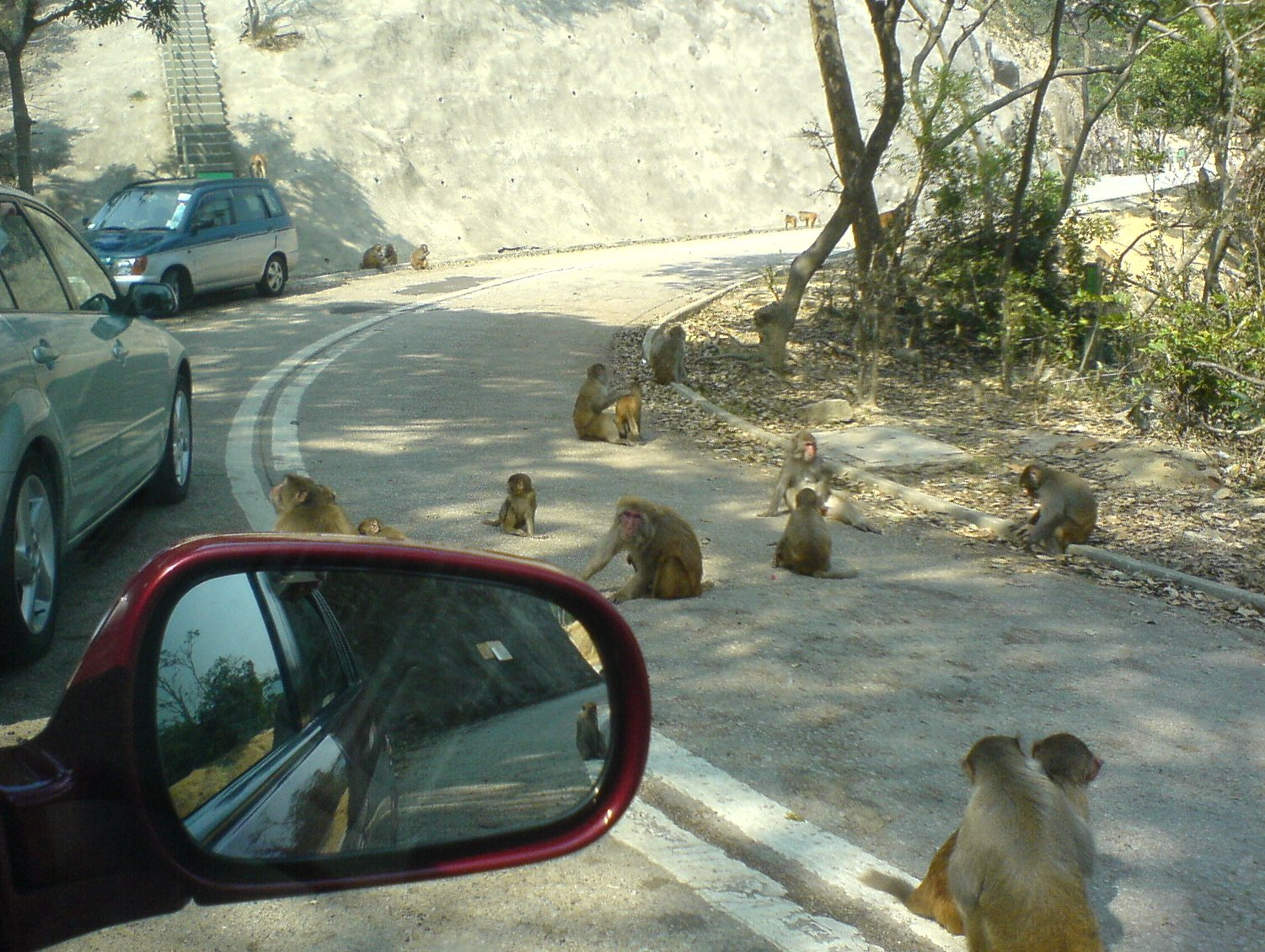
Monkeys in the country park

Golden Hill Country Park or Kam Shan Country Park (Chinese: 金山郊野公園; Jyutping: gam1 saan1 gaau1 je5 gung1 jyun4), also known in Hong Kong as Monkey Hill (Chinese: 馬騮山; Jyutping: maa5 lau1 saan1), established on 24 June 1977, is a country park located in the ranges north of Kowloon, Hong Kong. It covers an area of 3.37 square kilometres (1.30 sq mi). Most of the area is covered by the Kowloon Group of Reservoirs. Inside the park, there are jogging trails, barbecue and picnic areas, which are easily accessible from Tai Po Road (Piper's Hill) via waterworks access roads. The park takes its name from the 369 metres (1,211 ft) peak, Golden Hill or Kam Shan (金山), which is the highest feature in the area.

Panoramic views can be enjoyed from the slopes of Golden Hill and several places along the western ridge at the park. From these vantage points, the whole length of Smuggler's Ridge, Tai Mo Shan (the highest peak in Hong Kong), Needle Hill, Sha Tin New Town, Lion Rock and Beacon Hill can be seen. The northern part of Kowloon, the western anchorage of the harbour, Stonecutters Island, the housing estates of Kwai Chung, the container port, the industrial parts of Tsing Yi Island and the town of Tsuen Wan can also be viewed from here. The park is famous for its conservations of macaque monkeys.

== Attractions ==
=== Geology ===
An area of granite of the Upper Jurassic period (formed between 130 million and 160 million years ago), the rocks are well exposed in road cuttings inside the park.

=== Animals ===
Kam Shan, or Monkey Hill to most locals, is a famous macaques kingdom in Hong Kong. The macaques are the largest group of large mammals in the park. The most significant species occurring here are rhesus macaque (Macaca mulatta) and long-tailed macaque (Macaca fascicularis). These monkeys are probably descendants of monkeys released by pet owners in the 1920s, whereas wild macaque groups native to Hong Kong have almost disappeared due to habitat destruction and over-hunting. Apart from monkeys, this Country Park is also a shelter of squirrels and many bird species. There are about 2,100 wild monkeys in Hong Kong, about 1,800 of them in Kam Shan country park.

The park also provide habitat for forest animals found in few other parts of Hong Kong. Among these are protected species like the crested goshawk (Accipiter trivirgatus). Other birds found in the park include the black-eared kite (Milvus migrans lineatus), house swift (Apus (affinis) nipalensis), greater coucal (Centropus s.sinensis), common kingfisher (Alcedo atthis), rufous-backed shrike (Lanius schach) and common tailorbird (Orthotomus sutorius).

=== Flora ===
Since the 1950s, exotic flora species have been progressively introduced to Kam Shan Country Park. These exotic species includes Brisbane box (Lophostemon confertus) and eucalyptus species from Australia, and the charming paper-bark tree (Melaleuca quinquenervia).

The Country Park is very rich in flora, with a great diversity of native and exotic species. Melastoma species, rose myrtle (Rhodomyrtus tomentosa), acronychia (Acronychia pedunculata), Hong Kong gordonia (Gordonia axillaris), fragrant litsea (Litsea cubeba), red machilus (Machilus thunbergii), pop-gun seed (Bridelia tomentosa) and ivy tree (Heptapleurum heptaphyllum), and the ram-rod bamboo (Pseudosasa hindsii) are the common varieties in the Country Park.

== Monkey killings ==
According to park wardens, since 2006 about 38 animal traps have been found in the park. An animal rights volunteer group was formed in 2007 when people discovered illegal hunting activities in the park. Dead monkeys wounded with sharp objects have been found in the park since 2007. On 3 March 2009 a dead monkey was found with a loop trap around its leg with body stab wounds.

According to rights group, 300 wild monkeys were slaughtered for mainland China in May 2009. A man also used a BB gun to shoot the monkeys and shot one of the volunteers. Police arrived at the scene, Secretary for Food and Health York Chow Yat-ngok said he stepped up patrols to clear traps. Kwan Chi-yee, president of the Hong Kong Chinese Herbalists Association, issued a warning against eating monkey meat, saying "their meat can contain unknown viruses. It's a myth that it's nutritious." Under the Wild Animals Protection Ordinance, anyone hunting or willingly disturbing wild animals is liable to a fine of HK$100,000 and one year in jail.

== See also ==
- Lion Rock Country Park
- Shing Mun Country Park
- Conghua city yueyuan animal breeding farm
