= Needle Hill =

Mountain in Hong Kong

- 針山
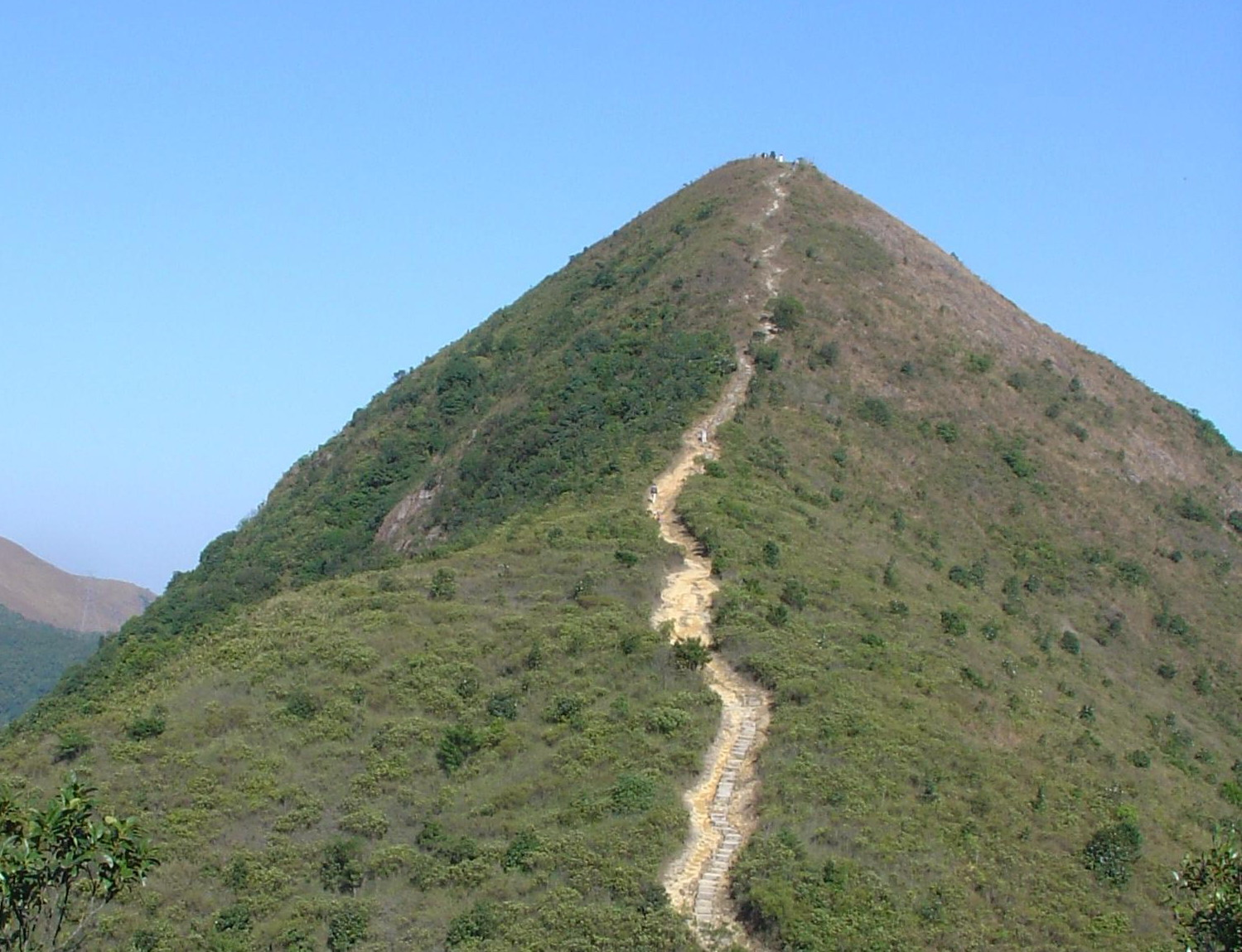
- Stage 7 of the MacLehose Trail near the summit of Needle Hill

Highest point
- Elevation: 532 m (1,745 ft); HKPD
- Coordinates: 22.387089°N 114.160486°E

Geography
- Location within Hong Kong
- Location: Hong Kong

Needle Hill or Cham Shan (Chinese: 針山) is a mountain in New Territories, Hong Kong. It has an altitude of 532 m. This is a part of a popular hiking route including Grassy Hill and Tai Mo Shan. The mountain got its name due to the resemblance of a needle by its peak.

Needle Hill
- Traditional Chinese: 針山
- Simplified Chinese: 针山
- Literal meaning: Needle Mountain
Transcriptions
Standard Mandarin
- Hanyu Pinyin: Zhēn Shān
Hakka
- Romanization: Zem1 San1
Yue: Cantonese
- Yale Romanization: jām sāan
- Jyutping: Zam1 Saan1

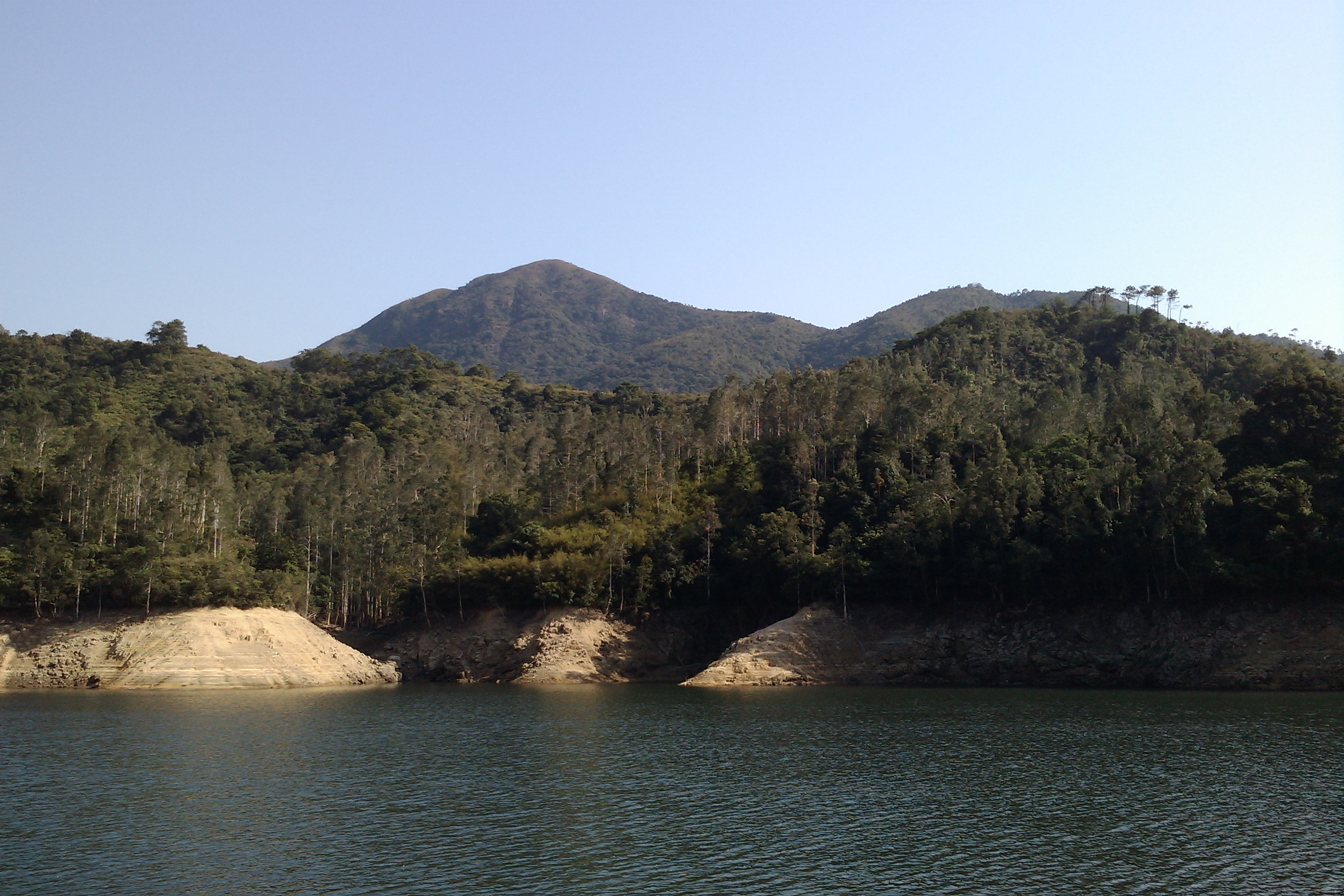
Needle Hill viewed from the Shing Mun Reservoir (image by Vox Solis)

== Geography ==
At around 400 above sea level, it forms a needle-like shape at its peak. The granitic rocks that form this hill is part of a granitic ridge that starts at the Tolo Channel and ends in Kwai Chung.

Needle Hill is located within Shing Mun Country Park. Stage 7 of the MacLehose Trail includes the summit of Needle Hill. The Shing Mun Tunnels pass through the base of Needle Hill. The Lower Shing Mun River can also be found at the base of the hill.

== Geology ==
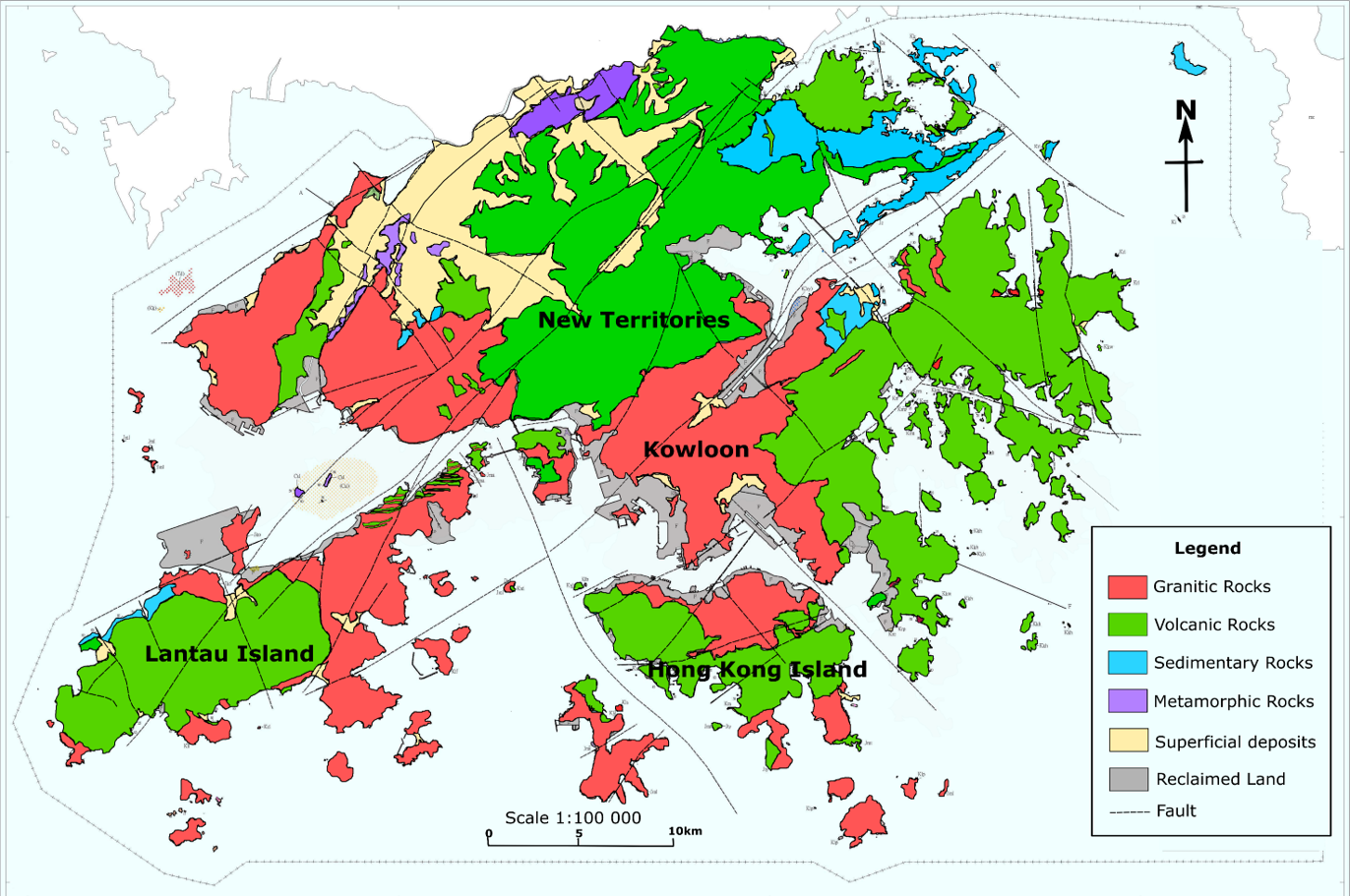
A Hong Kong geological map showing the distribution of the types of rocks there. Needle Hill is in red, which shows it consists of mostly granitic rocks.

Needle Hill is mainly composed of granite. Wolframite, molybdenite and quartz ores can be found at the base of the hill.

== History ==
Wolframite, a tungsten ore, was discovered at Needle Hill in 1935. It was mined there from 1938 to 1967. The mines used to obtain wolframite ores are now abandoned.

== See also ==
- List of mountains, peaks and hills in Hong Kong
- Mining in Hong Kong
