= Shek O Country Park =

Country park in Southern District, Hong Kong

Coordinates: 22°14′16″N 114°14′29″E

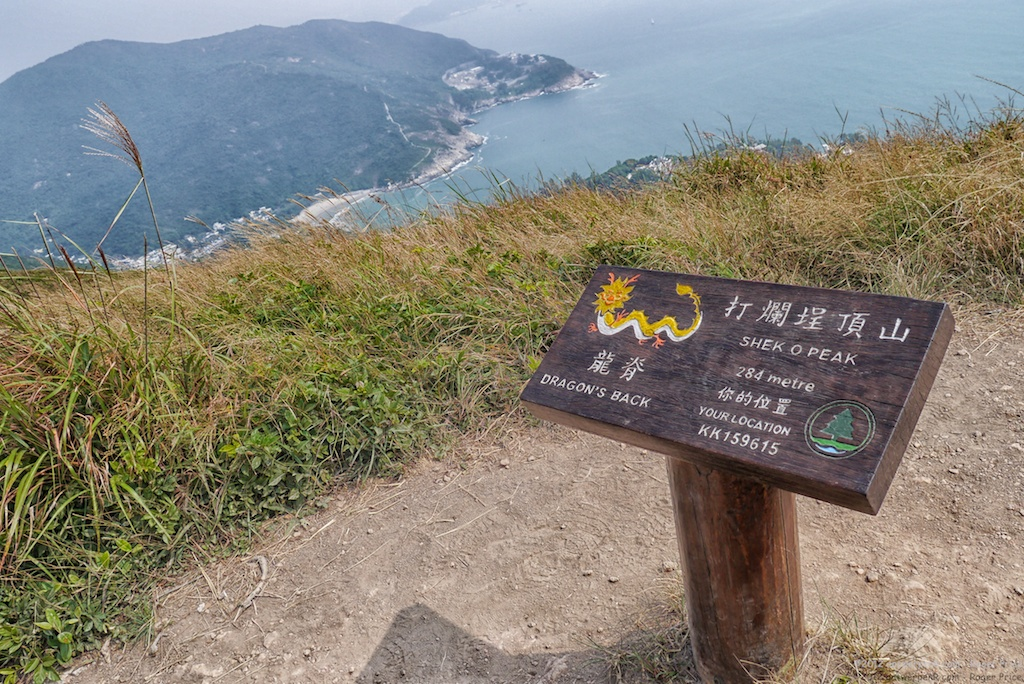
Shek O Peak, part of the Dragon's Back, in Shek O Country Park.

Shek O Country Park is a 701-hectare rural marine park located on Shek O, Southern District, Hong Kong and facing the South China Sea. The park opened on 21 September 1979.

The park is popular for its Hiking trails. In 2004, Time Magazine Asia described one of the trails, the Dragon's Back, as the best urban hiking trail in Asia.

The spider species Uroballus carlei was discovered in Shek O Country park in 2019.

== Features ==
The park's attractions include:

- Pottinger Peak
- Mount Collinson
- Wan Cham Shan
- Dragon's Back, including Shek O Peak
- D'Aguilar Peak
- Hong Kong Trail
- To Tei Wan Village
- Shek O Beach

== See also ==
- D'Aguilar Peninsula
