= Mount Collinson =

Mountain peak

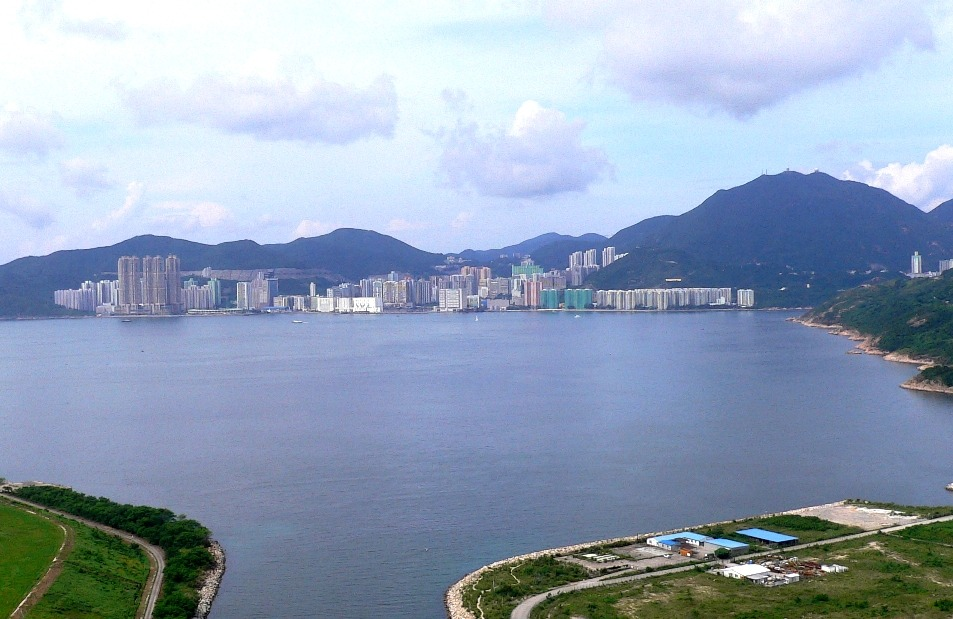
- The view of Mount Collinson (right) from Junk Bay in 2006

Highest point
- Elevation: 348 m (1,142 ft)
- Prominence: 180 m (590 ft)
- Isolation: 2.1 km (1.3 mi)
- Coordinates: 22.251742°N 114.235277°E

Geography
- Location within Hong Kong
- Location: Far East of Hong Kong Island, Hong Kong SAR

Mount Collinson (Chinese: 歌連臣山) is a mountain located in the far east of Hong Kong Island, Hong Kong. The mountain has a sea level elevation of 348 m (1,142 ft).

It is situated within the Shek O Country Park, which has an area of 7.01 square kilometres (2.71 square miles). It is located in the southeastern corner of Hong Kong Island. There are 7 named peaks in the park, and Mount Collinson is the highest among them.

Mount Collinson
- Traditional Chinese: 歌連臣山
- Simplified Chinese: 歌连臣山
- Literal meaning: Collinson Mountain
Transcriptions
Standard Mandarin
- Hanyu Pinyin: Gēliánchénshān / Gēliánchén Shān
Hakka
- Romanization: Go1 Liên2 San4 San1
Yue: Cantonese
- Yale Romanization: gō lìhn sàhn sāan
- Jyutping: Go1 Lin4 San4 Saan1

== Location ==
Hong Kong Trail Section 8 crosses the slope side of the mountain, which connects between Shek O Peak (also known as Dragon Back)'s intersection point, Tai Tam Gap Correctional Institution and Tai Long Wan (Sai Kung District).

== Summit ==
Despite having no properly-paved trails to reach the summit, it is still marked with a summit marking pillar. The Tai Tam Gap is facing northbound from the summit, with Shek O facing southbound.

== See also ==
- Thomas Bernard Collinson
