= Big Wave Bay, Hong Kong Island =

Bay in Hong Kong

Coordinates: 22°14′45″N 114°14′51″E

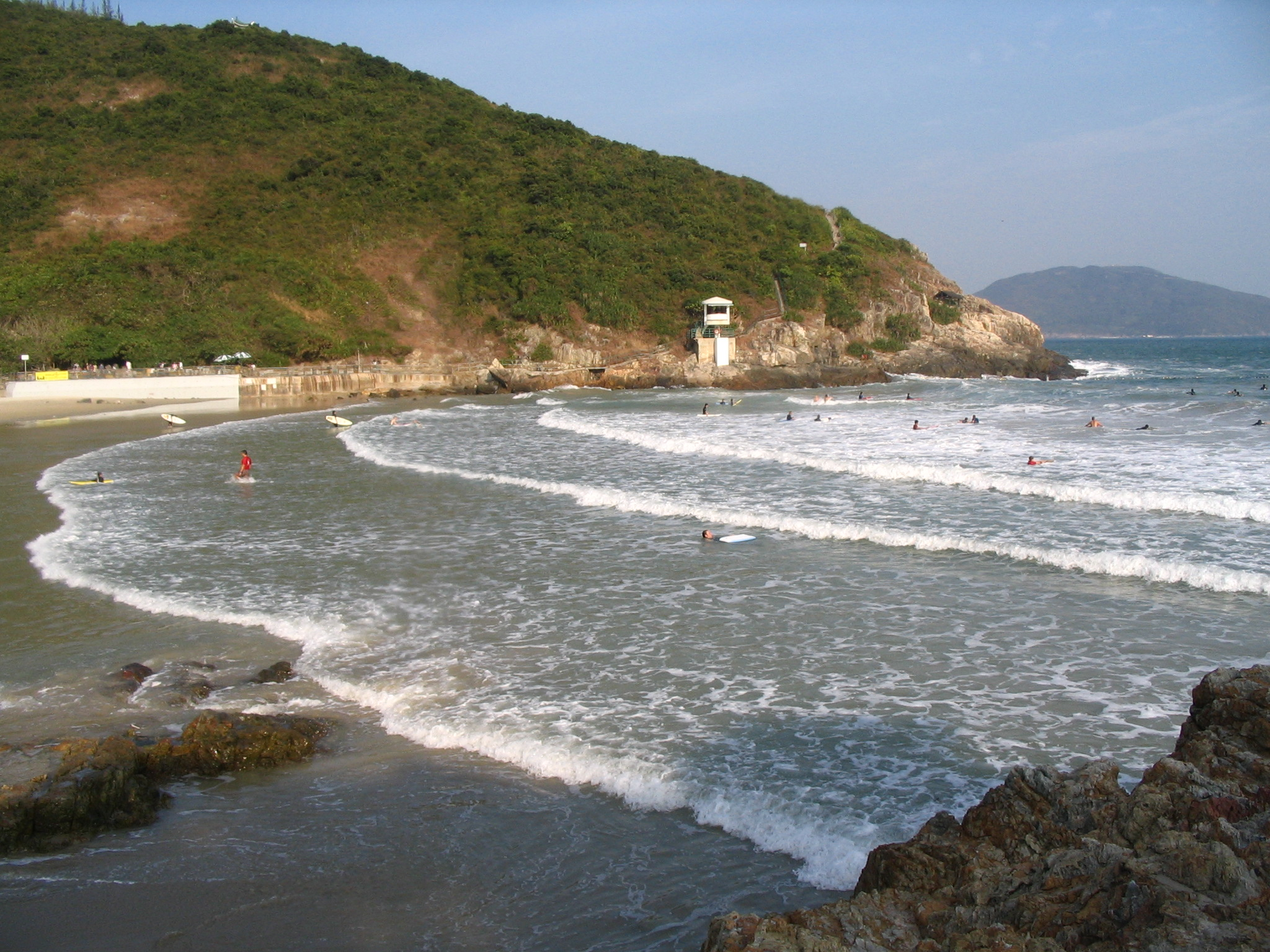
- Big Wave Bay Beach
- Traditional Chinese: 大浪灣
- Simplified Chinese: 大浪湾
Transcriptions
Standard Mandarin
- Hanyu Pinyin: Dàlàngwān
Yue: Cantonese
- Yale Romanization: Daaih lohng wāan
- Jyutping: Daai6 long6 waan1

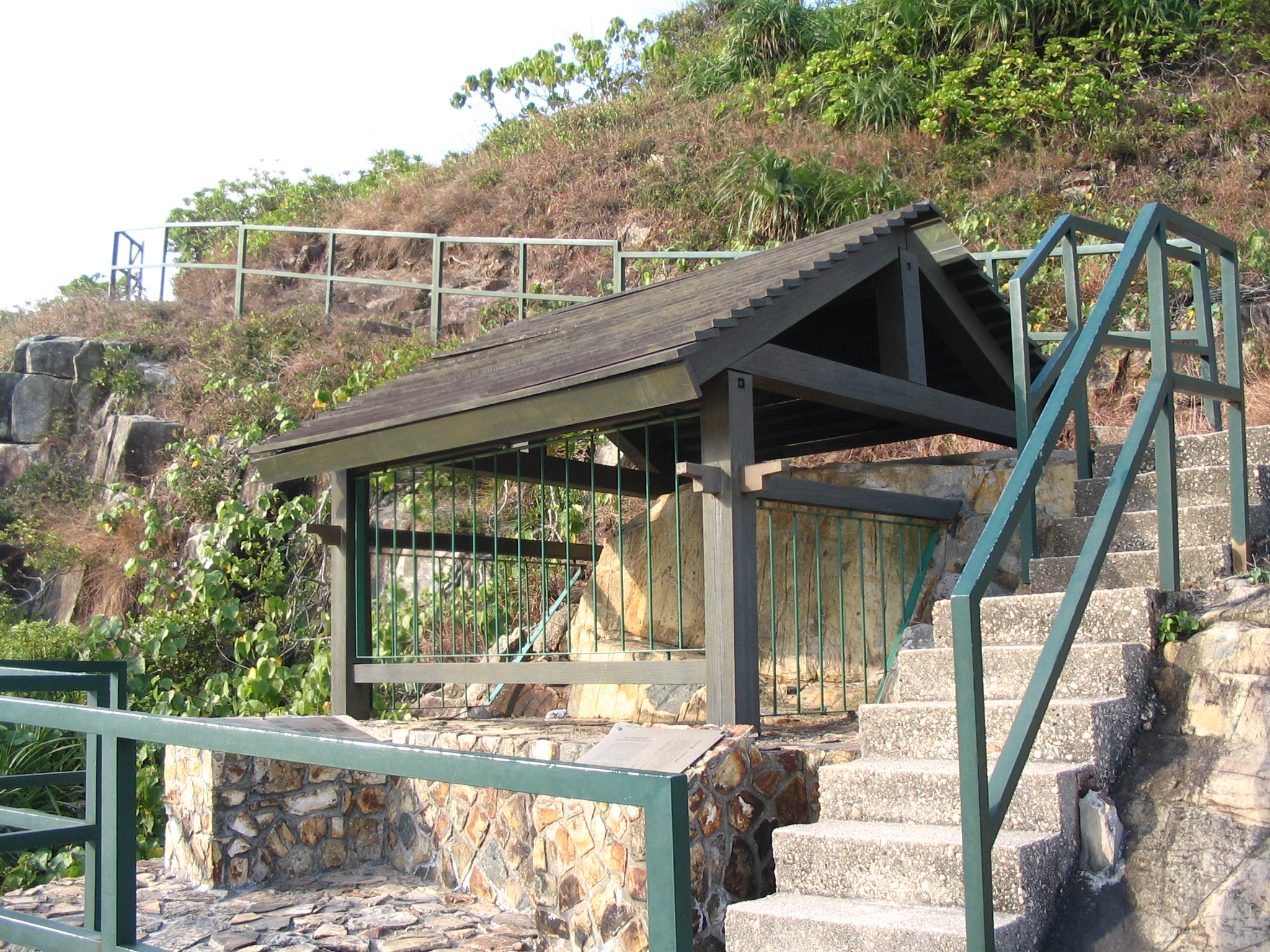
Big Wave Bay Rock Carving

Big Wave Bay or Tai Long Wan (大浪灣) is a bay in the Southern District of Hong Kong. It is located on the eastern coast of Hong Kong Island, south of Cape Collinson and north of Shek O. This bay should not be confused with the bay with the same name in Sai Kung.

== Features ==
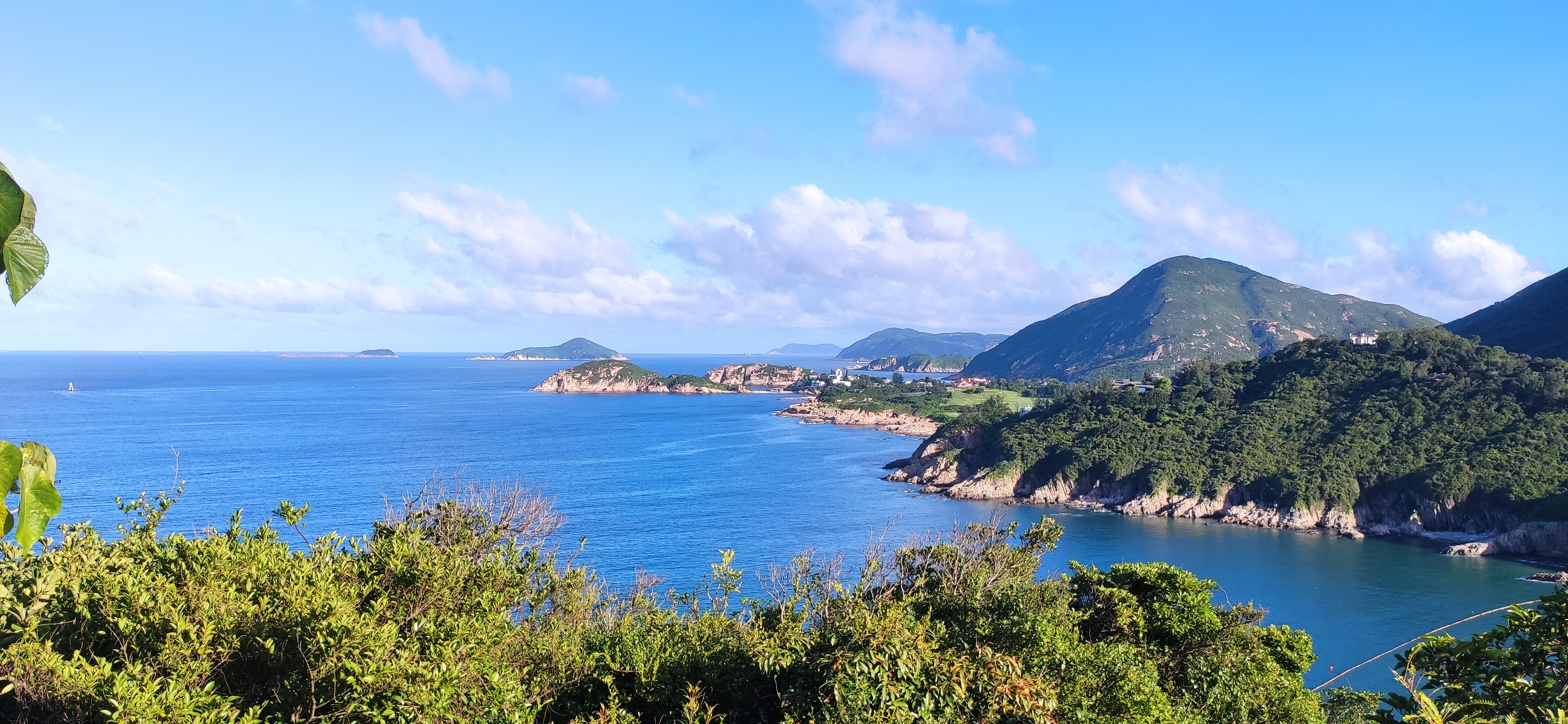
Big Wave Bay

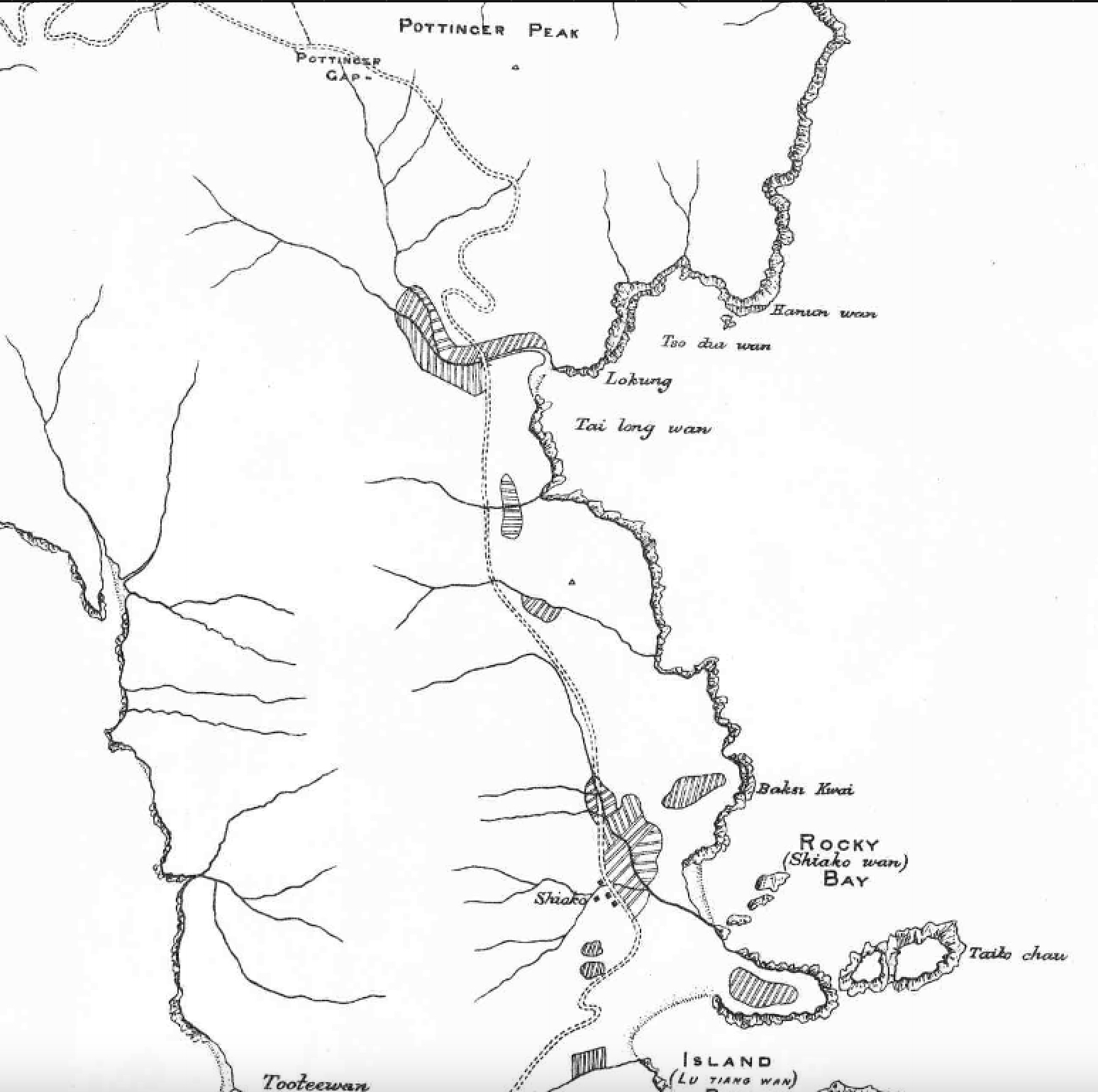
Big Wave Bay (Tai Long Wan) as shown in a map from 1895.

Big Wave Bay has a beach popular among surfers. It is also the site of a prehistoric rock carving, which is a declared monument.

Tai Long Wan Village (大浪灣村) is located nearby.

== Education ==
Tai Long Wan is in Primary One Admission (POA) School Net 16. Within the school net are multiple aided schools (operated independently but funded with government money) and two government schools: Shau Kei Wan Government Primary School and Aldrich Bay Government Primary School.

== Access ==
The only access by road to Big Wave Bay is by Tai Tam Road, Shek O Road and then Big Wave Bay Road. The Hong Kong Government Gazette writes on April 12, 1935:

Road branching off Shek O Road, east of Rural Building Lot 277, terminating near Big Wave Bay to the west of Rural Building Lot 290... Big Wave Bay Road 大 浪 灣 道

— No. 302, Hong Kong Government Gazette, 28 September 1935,

It is also the eastern end of the Hong Kong Trail, at the end of Section 8. This section coincides with the Dragon's Back trail going between Shek O and Big Wave Bay.

== See also ==
- Big Wave Bay Beach
- Hong Kong Trail
- Shek O Country Park
- Dragon's Back
