= Shek O Road =

Road in Hong Kong

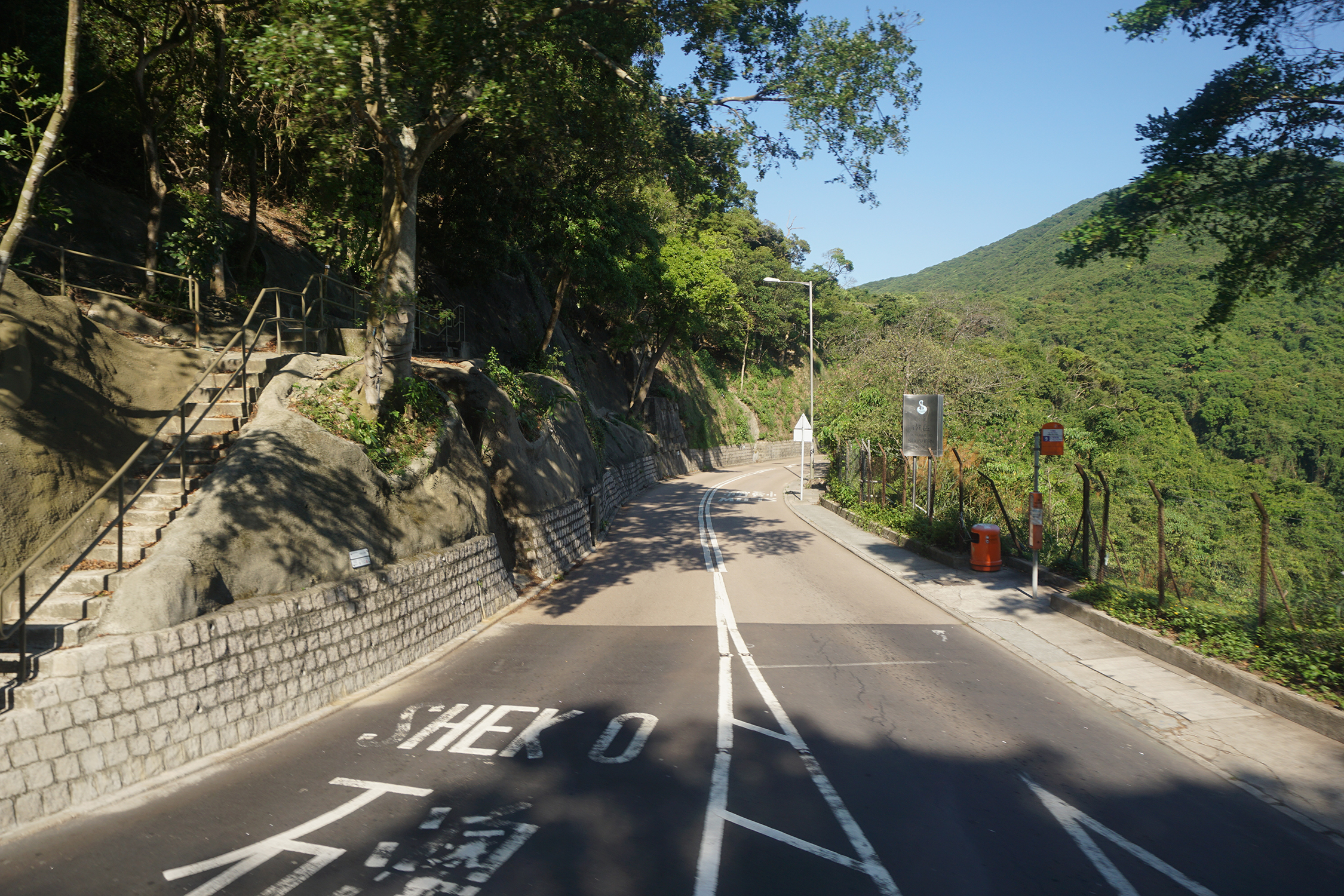
- Shek O Road
- Native name: 石澳道 (Yue Chinese)
- Namesake: Shek O
- Length: 7.2 km (4.5 mi)
- Location: Hong Kong
- Coordinates: 22.24188°N 114.23831°E
- West end: Tai Tam Road
- East end: Shek O Village Road

Construction
- Inauguration: Seen on maps since 1922

Shek O Road
- Traditional Chinese: 石澳道
Transcriptions
Standard Mandarin
- Hanyu Pinyin: Shí'ào Dào
Yue: Cantonese
- Jyutping: sek6 ou3 dou6

Shek O Road (Chinese: 石澳道) is a road in the Southern District of Hong Kong Island, Hong Kong. The road links Tai Tam Road near Tai Tam Gap and Chai Wan to Shek O Village in the southeast. It is widely known as a scenic drive, with views of the South China Sea.

== History ==
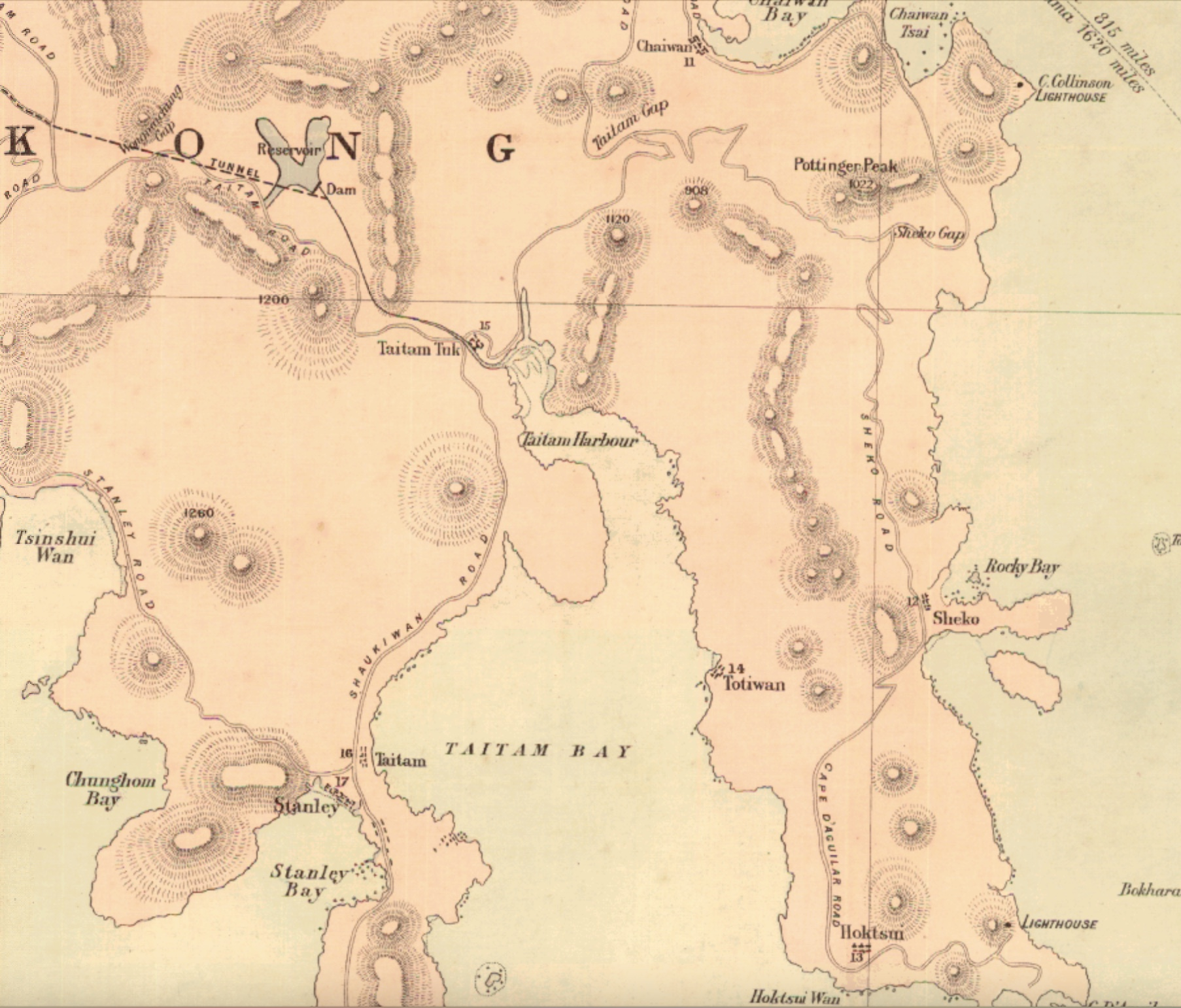
Hong Kong Island as surveyed in 1881 January. Old Shek O Road is on the East side.

The name Shek O Road was found in maps in 1888, which today is part of Big Wave Bay Road and the Hong Kong Trail Section 8. (see inlet). The old Shek O Road was not wide enough for vehicular access, so another road was built to connect Shek O and Cape D'Aguilar to the rest of Hong Kong Island.

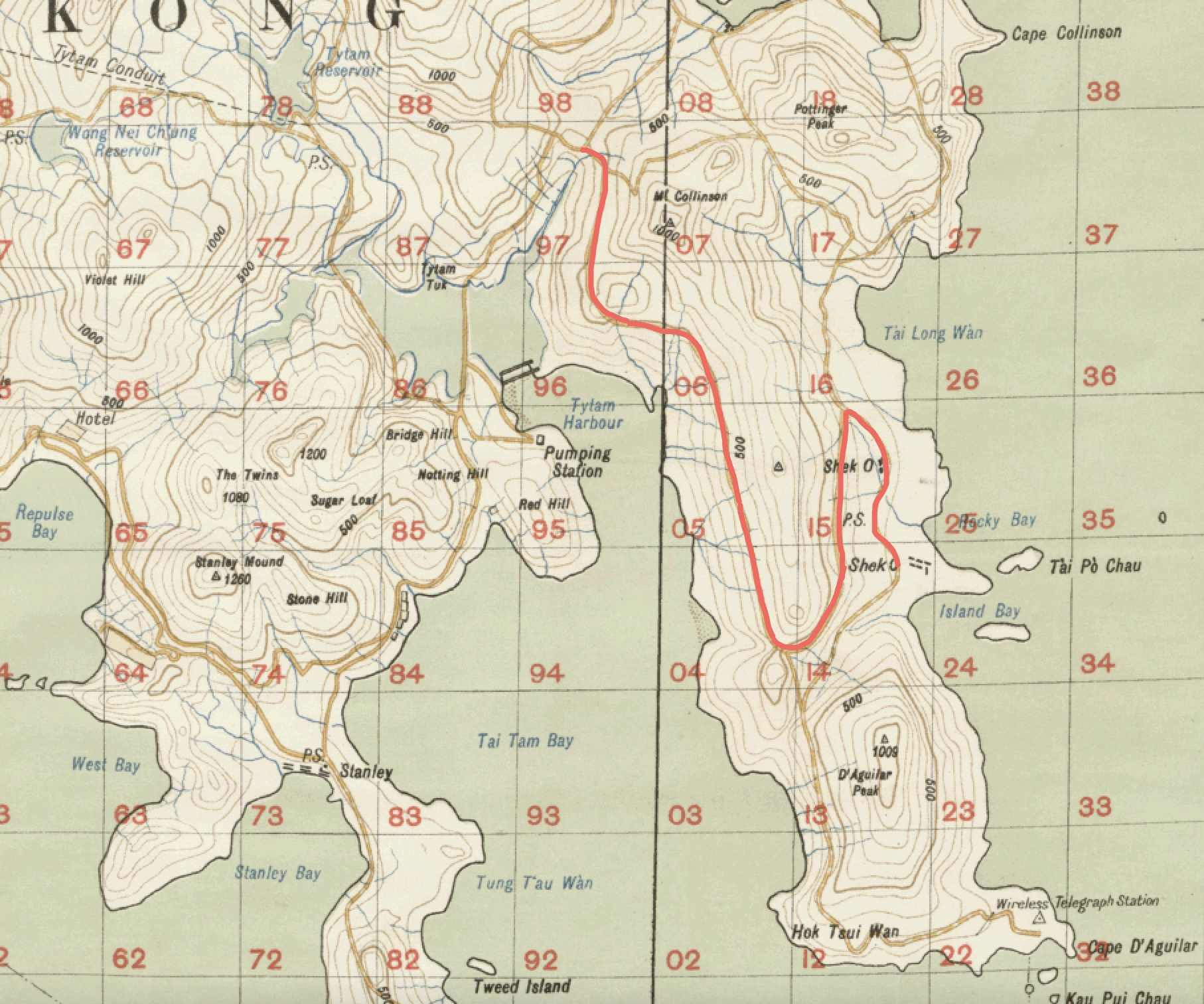
Hong Kong Island as surveyed in 1922. Shek O Road is shown in red.

The current Shek O Road was completed latest by 1922, indicating a start of construction in the 1910s. The name Shek O Road was standardized and named in the Hong Kong Government Gazette on April 12, 1935:

Road commencing at Tytam Gap and running to Shek O Village ... Shek O Road 石 澳 道

— No. 302, Hong Kong Government Gazette, 28 September 1935,

Shek O was home to a large quarry named Shek O Quarry, which occupied 45 hectares on the west side of Cape D'Aguilar. It was one of the eight quarries that operated in Hong Kong. During its rehabilitation contract between 1993 and 2005, whose objective was to repair the surrounding environment for its eventual closure, Shek O Road was diverted and repaired, and shortened by 660 meters. A steep bend near Windy Gap was also removed.

On 8 September 2023, a large rainstorm destroyed large parts of Shek O Road. The restoration and strengthening work was mostly completed by February 2024.

== Intersecting Streets ==
Roads are listed West to East.

- Tai Tam Road
- Cape Collinson Road
- Cape d'Aguilar Road
- Big Wave Bay Road
- Shek O Village Road near Shek O Beach.

== See also ==
- Shek O
- Tai Tam
- Tai Tam Road
- Cape D'Aguilar
- List of streets and roads in Hong Kong
