= Obelisk Hill (Hong Kong) =

Hill in Hong Kong

- 石碑山
- Location within Hong Kong

Highest point
- Elevation: 164 m (538 ft)
- Coordinates: 22°15′N 114°13′E

Geography
- Location: Hong Kong

Obelisk Hill (Chinese: 石碑山) is a hill in southern Hong Kong. Canadian troops took positions there in 1941 in preparation for attacks from the Imperial Japanese military.

== Geography ==
Obelisk Hill is 164m in height and is close to the Dragon's Back Trail. On its summit, there is a plain monument whose purpose and date of construction was once thought a mystery. Research by Stephen Davies in the early 2000s confirmed that the two obelisks (the other is at the base of Red Hill Peninsula) were erected in late 1899 or early 1900. However, subsequent research found that permission was granted for an encroachment by the Naval Authorities on Colonial Government Land for "a pair of obelisks, Tytam Bay, for swinging ships" in 1910. Naval ships were intended to use them to swing their magnetic compasses, that is, calibrate the error on each compass heading created by the ship's metal structure.

== See also ==
- List of mountains, peaks and hills in Hong Kong
- Dragon's Back
