= D'Aguilar Peak =

Hill in Hong Kong

- 鶴咀山
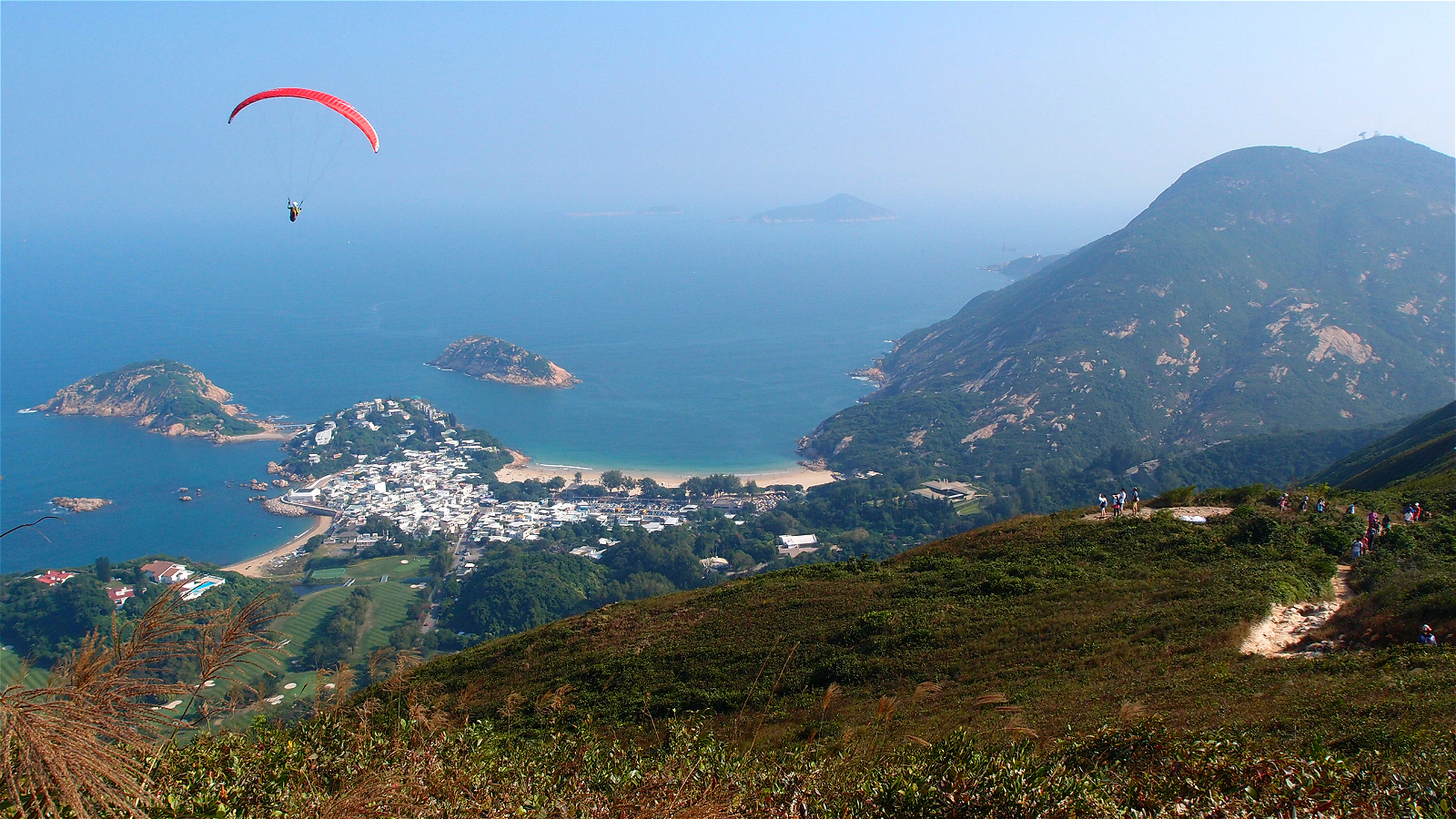
- View of D'Aguilar Peak from Shek O Peak's summit

Highest point
- Elevation: 325 m (1,066 ft)
- Coordinates: 22°12′16″N 114°15′22″E

Geography
- Location within Hong Kong
- Location: Hong Kong

D'Aguilar Peak
- Traditional Chinese: 鶴咀山
- Simplified Chinese: 鹤咀山
Transcriptions
Standard Mandarin
- Hanyu Pinyin: Hè Jǔ Shān
Yue: Cantonese
- Jyutping: hok6 zeoi2 saan1

D'Aguilar Peak or Hok Tsui Shan (Chinese: 鶴咀山) is a hill in southeastern Hong Kong. D'Aguilar Peak is clearly visible from the Dragon's Back trail, although the trail doesn't traverse its summit. It is named after Major-General Sir George Charles d'Aguilar.

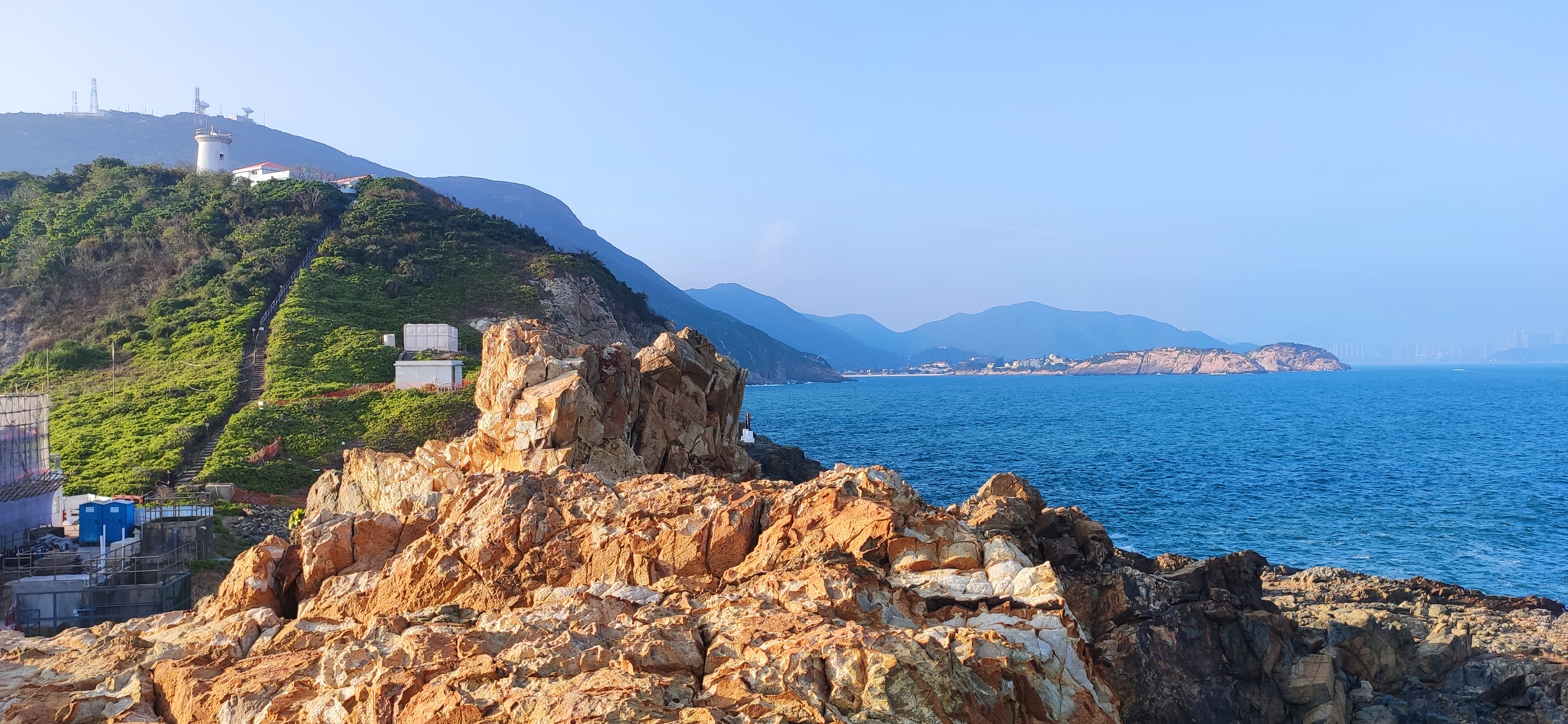
View of D'Aguilar Peak (top left) from Cape D'Aguilar

== Geography ==
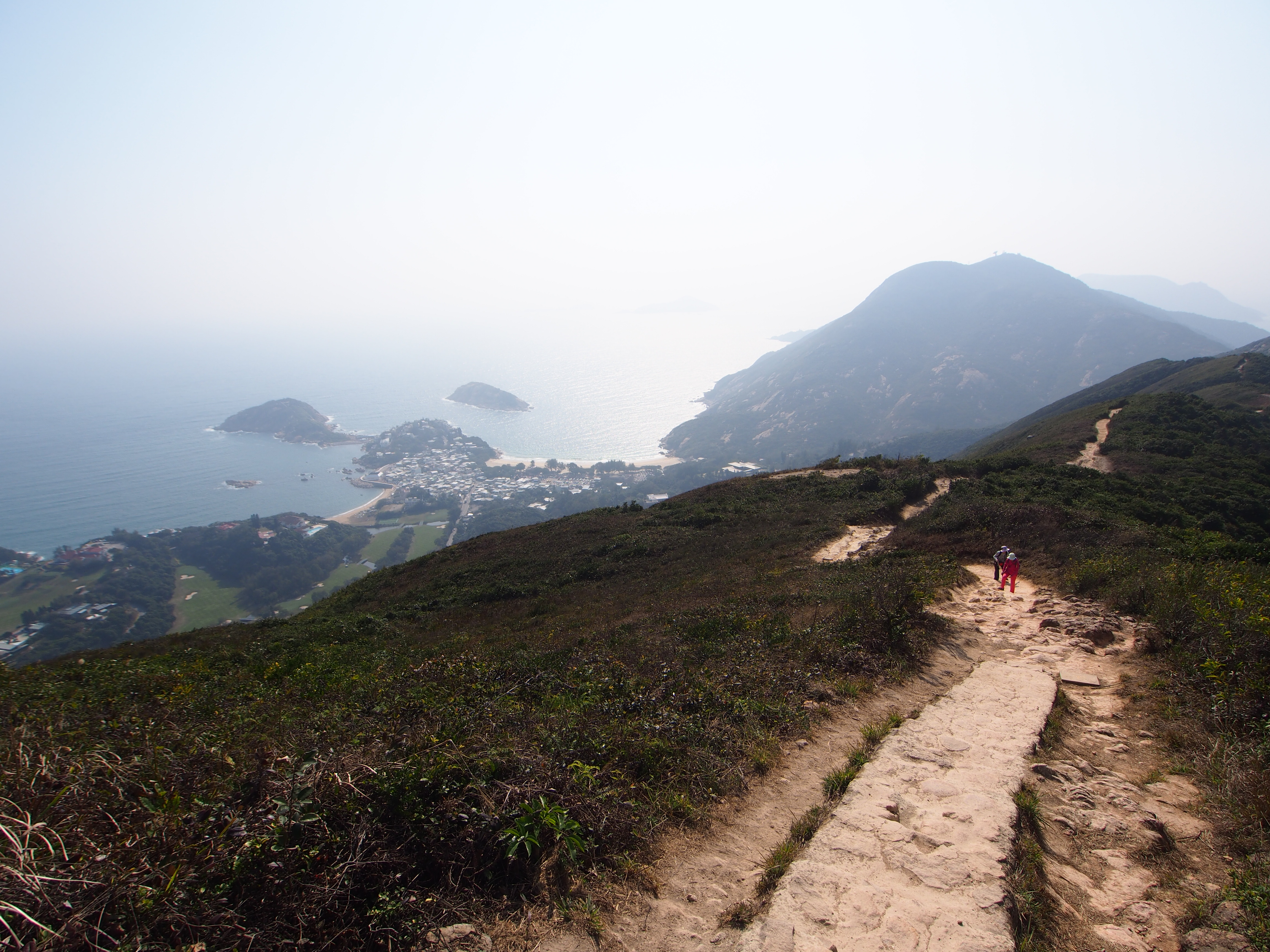
Summit of D'Aguilar Peak to the right

D'Aguilar Peak is 325m in height. To the north lies another hill called Shek O Peak.

== Conservation ==
A site located on the north-western slope of D'Aguilar Peak and south of Windy Gap, covering an area of 5 hectares (12 acres), was designated as a Site of Special Scientific Interest in 1975.

== Access ==
It is possible to access the summit of D'Aguilar Peak after hiking for about 30 minutes from Cape D'Aguilar Road. There is also a steep and rocky trail from Shek O Beach that leads to the summit.

== See also ==
- List of mountains, peaks and hills in Hong Kong
- Dragon's Back
- Cape D'Aguilar
