= Big Wave Bay Beach =

Beach in Hong Kong Island, Hong Kong

- Beach
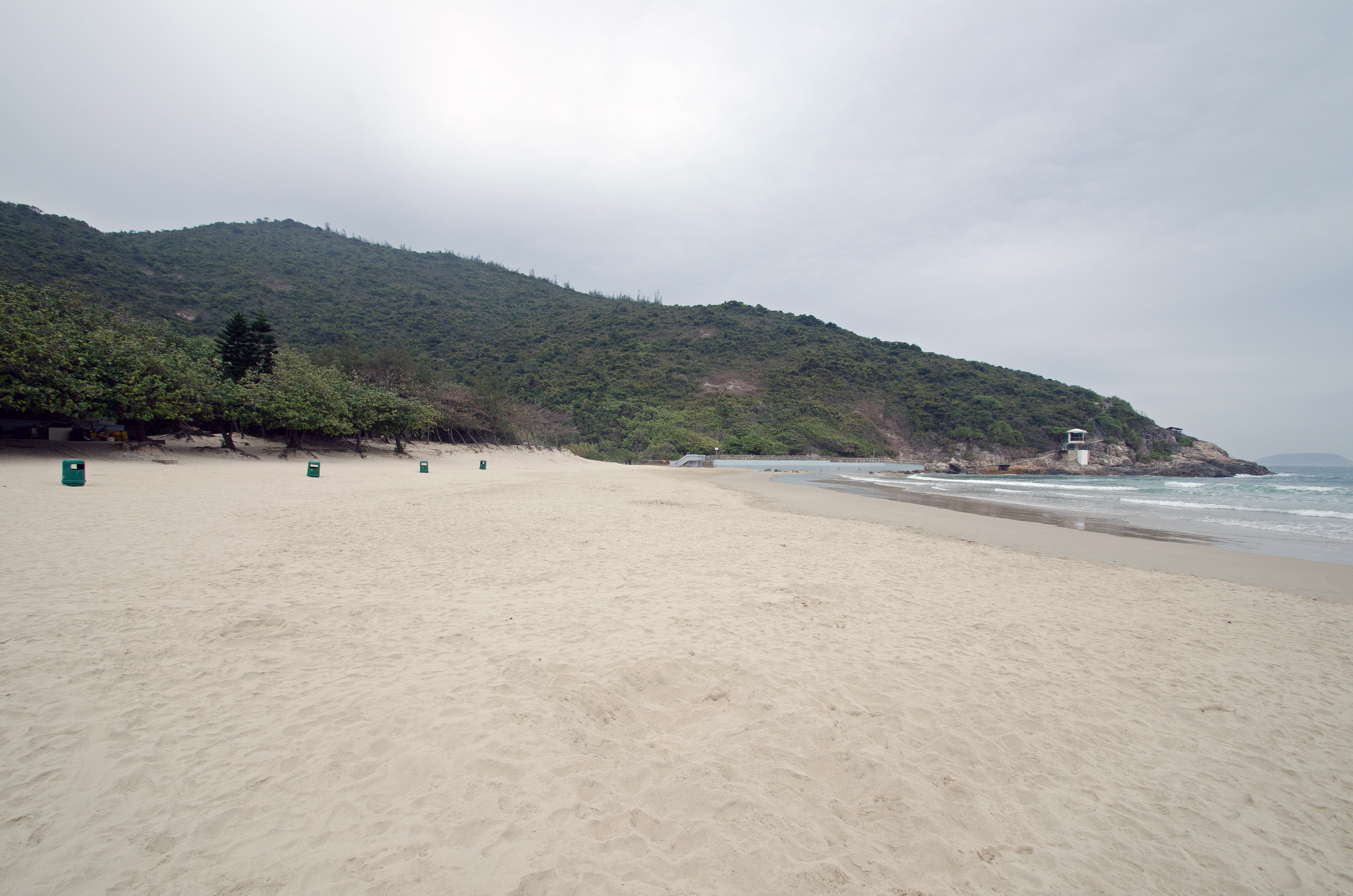
- Big Wave Bay Beach

- Location within Hong Kong
- Coordinates: 22.246532°N 114.24728°E
- Location: Shek O, Hong Kong Island

Dimensions
  - Length: 86 metres (282 ft)
- Patrolled by: Leisure and Cultural Services Department

Big Wave Bay Beach
- Traditional Chinese: 大浪灣泳灘
- Simplified Chinese: 大浪湾泳滩
Transcriptions
Standard Mandarin
- Hanyu Pinyin: Dà Làng Wān Yǒng Tān
Yue: Cantonese
- Jyutping: daai6 long6 waan1 wing6 taan1

Big Wave Bay Beach is a gazetted beach next to Big Wave Bay, Shek O, Southern District, Hong Kong. The beach has barbecue pits and is managed by the Leisure and Cultural Services Department (LCSD) of the Hong Kong Government. The beach is 86 metres long and is rated as Grade 1 by the Environmental Protection Department for its water quality. This beach is popular among surfers.

== Usage ==
The beach is accessed by Stage 8 of the Hong Kong Trail.

== Features ==
The beach has the following features:

- BBQ pits (20 nos.)
- Changing rooms
- Showers
- Toilets
- Fast food kiosk
- Water sports centre

== See also ==
- Beaches of Hong Kong
