= Wan Chai Gap =

Gap in Hong Kong

Coordinates: 22.267559°N 114.169862°E

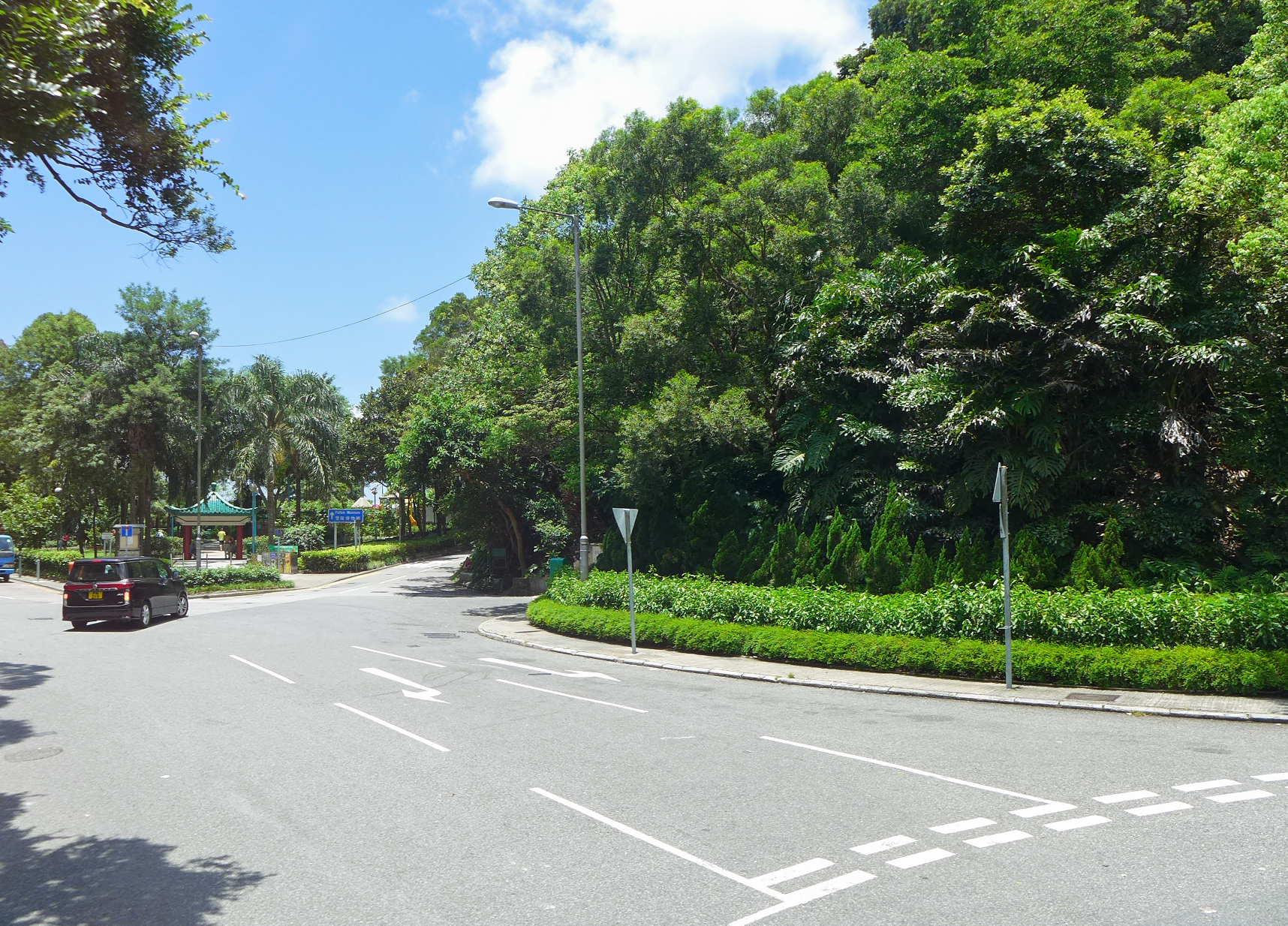
Wan Chai Gap near Wan Chai Gap Park in July 2016.

Wan Chai Gap (Chinese: 灣仔峽) is a gap in Wan Chai District, Hong Kong Island, in Hong Kong.

The Hong Kong Police Museum is located at Wan Chai Gap. It is housed in the former Wan Chai Gap Police Station, located at 27 Coombe Road.

== See also ==
- List of gaps in Hong Kong
- Aberdeen Country Park
- Hong Kong Trail
- Magazine Gap Road
