= Dragon's Back =

Ridge in southeastern Hong Kong Island, Hong Kong

Coordinates: 22.2357°N 114.2437°E

- Traditional Chinese: 龍脊
- Simplified Chinese: 龙脊
Transcriptions
Standard Mandarin
- Hanyu Pinyin: Lóng Jǐ
Yue: Cantonese
- Jyutping: lung4 zek3

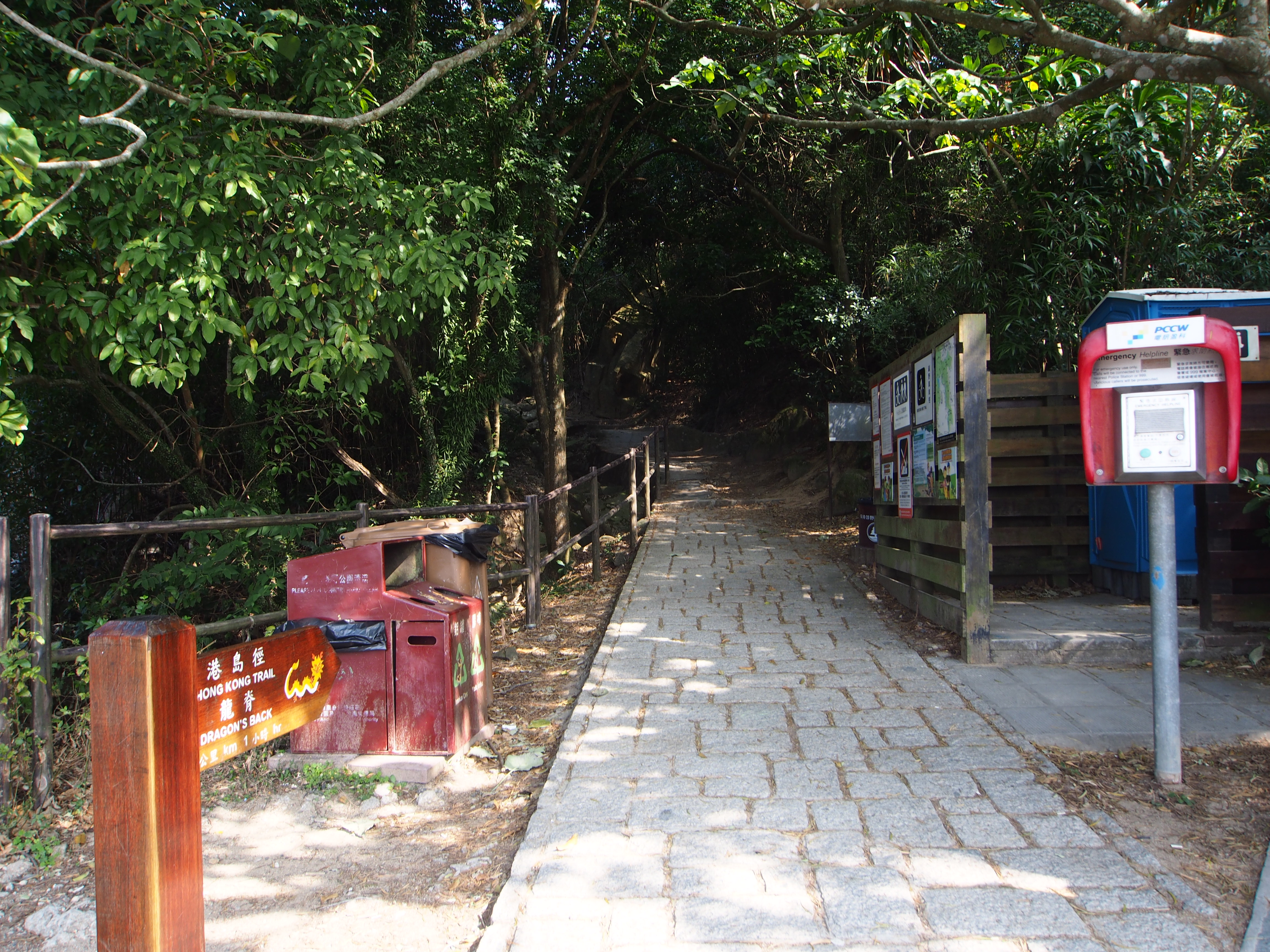
Starting point of the Dragon's Back trail along Shek O Road in 2015.

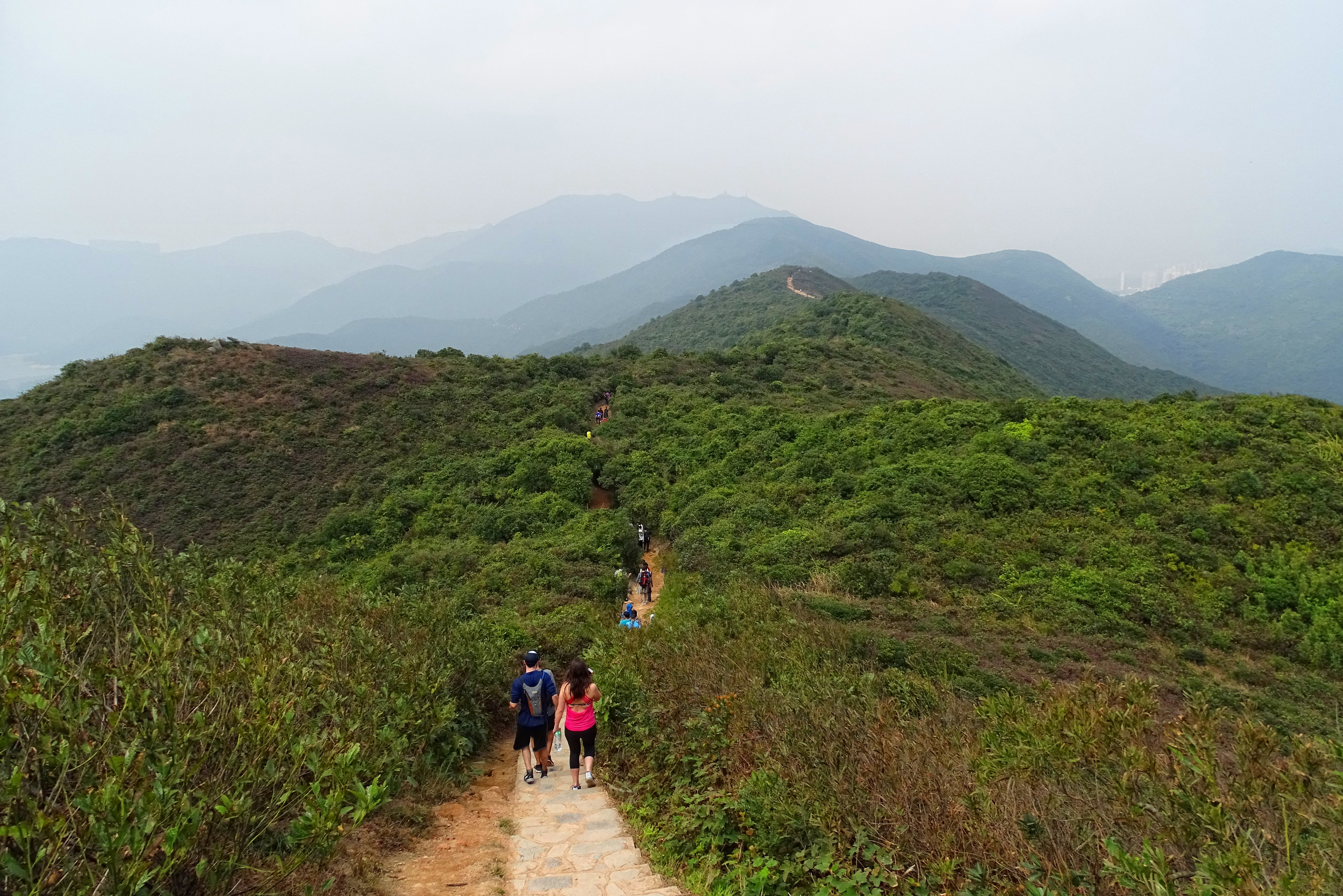
Dragon's Back towards the north.

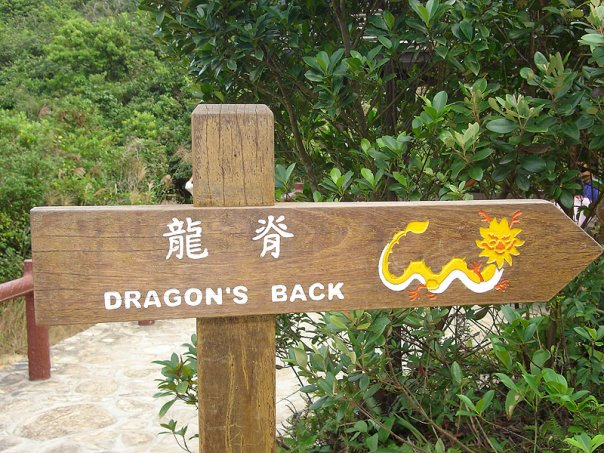
Dragon's Back hiking trail sign.

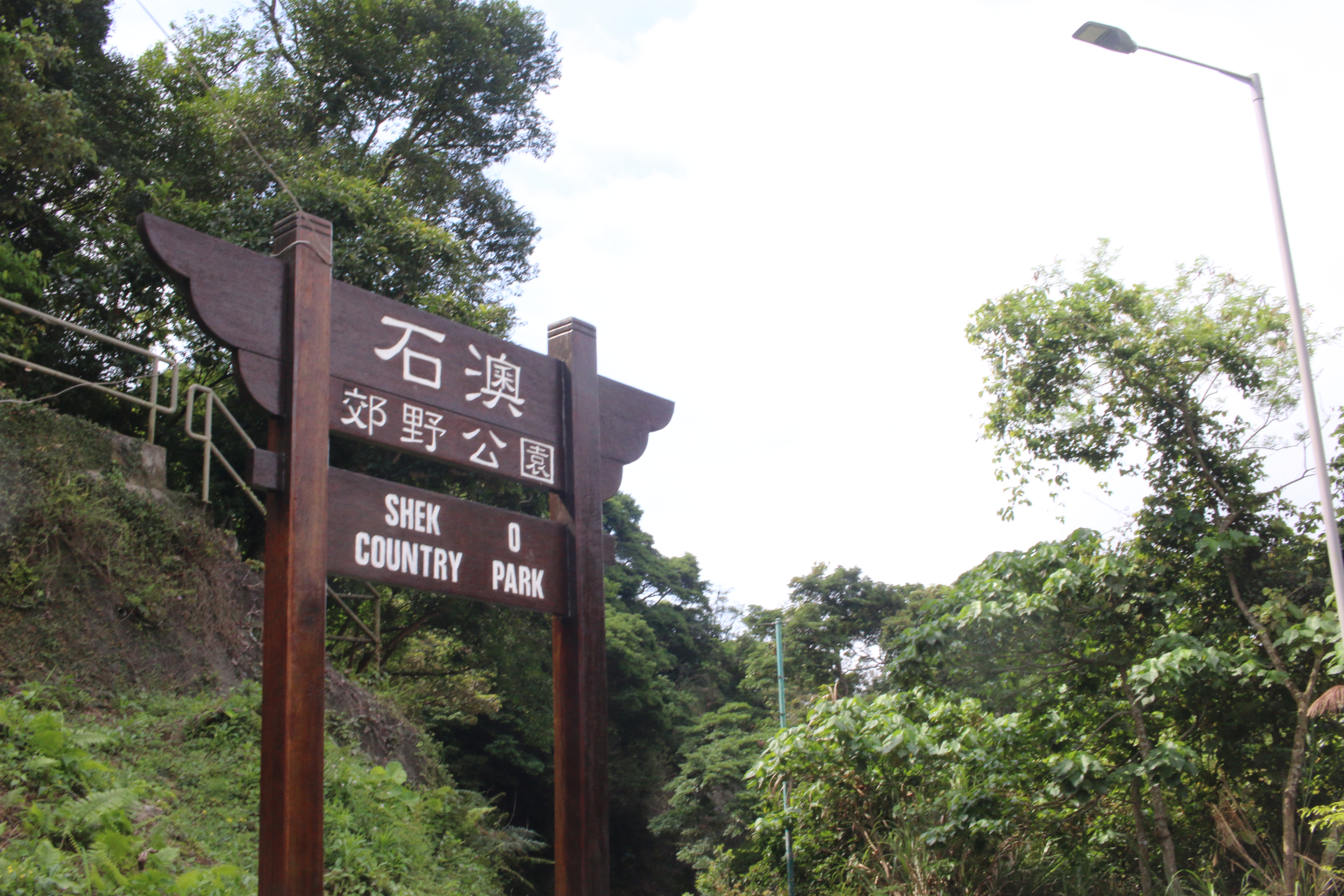
One of Shek O Country Park's entrance point, located near the Tai Tam Gap Correctional Institution.

The Dragon's Back (Chinese: 龍脊) is a mountain ridge in southeastern Hong Kong Island, Hong Kong that passes through Shek O Peak. It lies within the Shek O Country Park. In 2019, the Dragon's Back Trail was selected by CNN as one of the world's 23 best trails. Dragon's Back is part of Stage 8 of the Hong Kong Trail.

== Hiking information ==
Destinations in the vicinity

- Shek O Peak
- Shek O
- Big Wave Bay

Highlights

- Paragliders hanging in the air and eventually drifting down to a beach at Shek O.
- People flying radio-controlled gliders.

Overview

Area:	Southern District
Starting point:	Shek O Road near To Tei Wan Village
End point:	Big Wave Bay or back at the start point of To Tei Wan
Average hiking time:	4 hours
Distance:	About 8.5 km
Refuel:	There are no refueling stops along the trail.
Difficulty:	Moderate Most of the route is on dirt paths. The first half has very little shade, and there is also a steep 200-metre-long uphill stretch. The flight of descending stone steps in the last section is quite steep too.

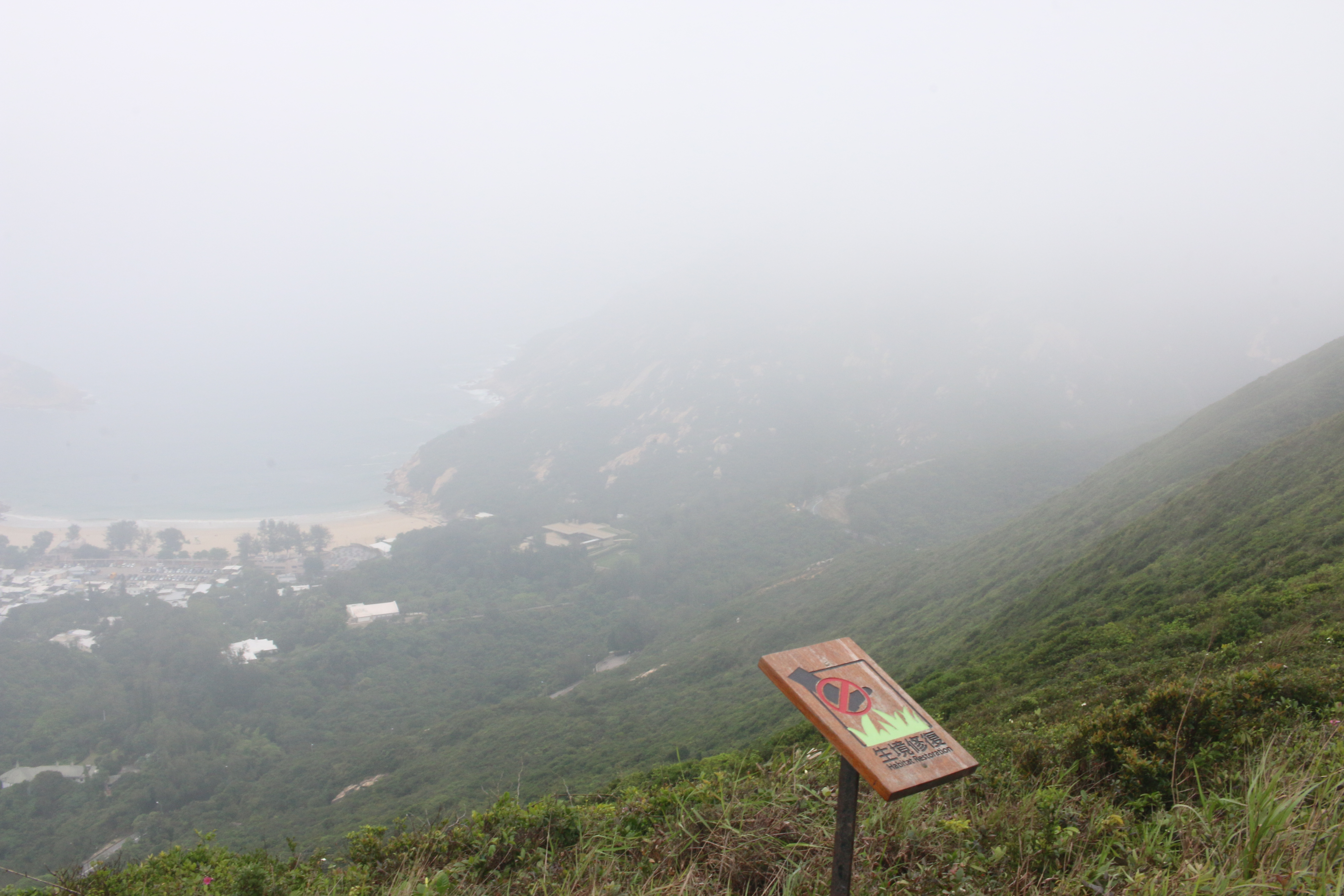
A waypoint located along the Dragon's Back trail, with a view of the Shek O behind.

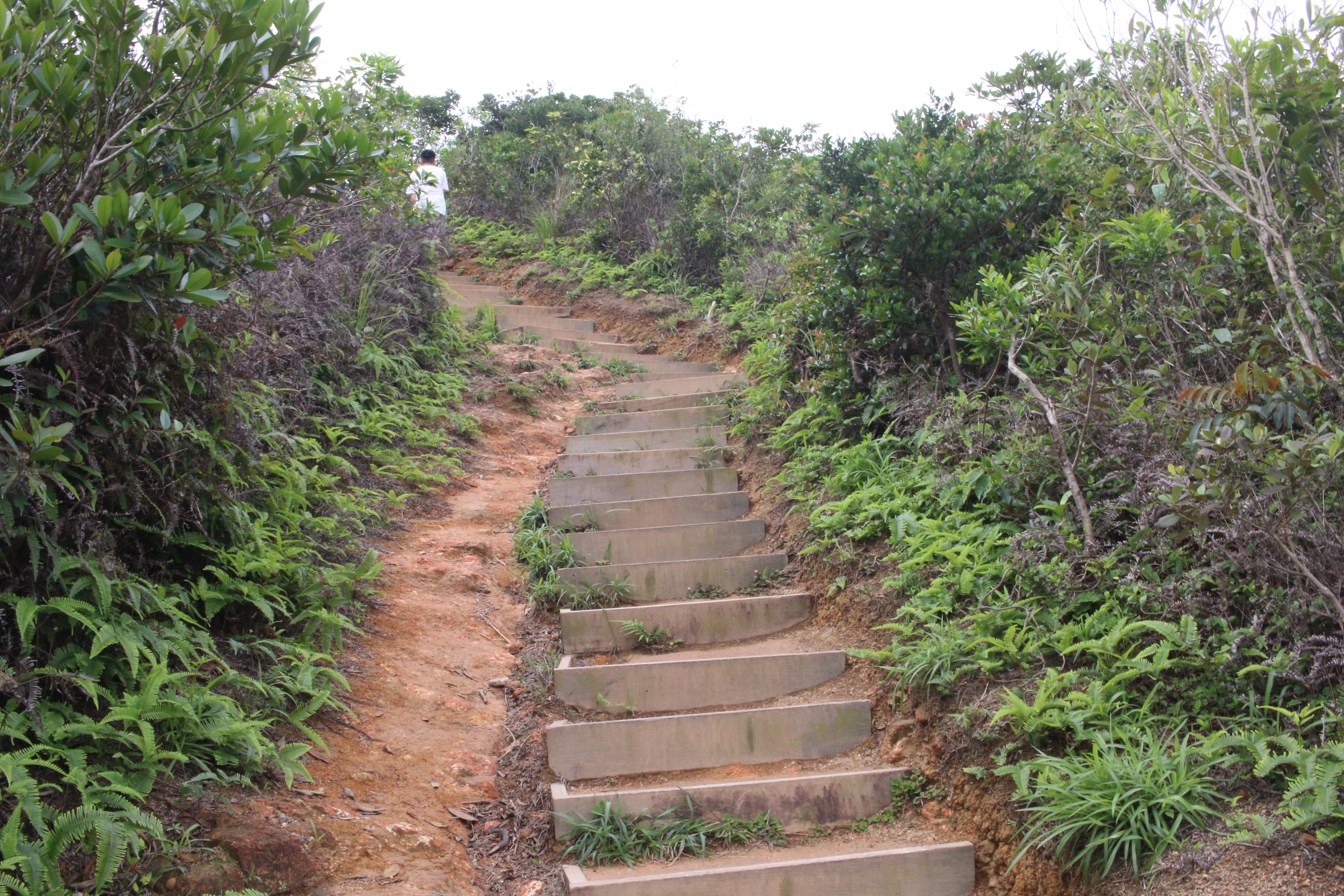
A partial sight of the Dragon's Back trail.

Information and hiking etiquette in Hong Kong

- Hong Kong's Country Parks have no trash bins, so hikers are asked to hang on to their litter until they exit the Country Parks
- Hikers in Hong Kong tend to keep to the right side when walking on trails.
- Try to limit boombox music volume to a minimum in Country Parks to let everyone enjoy the sounds of nature.
- Big Wave Bay Beach (the End point) and nearby Shek O Beach are two different beaches. There is a short bus service that links the two beaches.
- Some parts of this trail are rocky, so travellers should use proper footwear. Slippers and sandals are not advisable.
- At Pottinger Gap yue, hikers can extend the hike by walking along the easy Pottinger Peak Country Trail eastward for about 20 minutes and then make a 90-degree right turn onto a newly made path that descends southward for another 20 minutes to the Big Wave Bay Prehistoric Rock Carvings de, yue.

== See also ==
- Shek O Peak
- Shek O
- Big Wave Bay
