= Shek O =

Area of Hong Kong Island, Hong Kong

Coordinates: 22°13′50″N 114°15′07″E

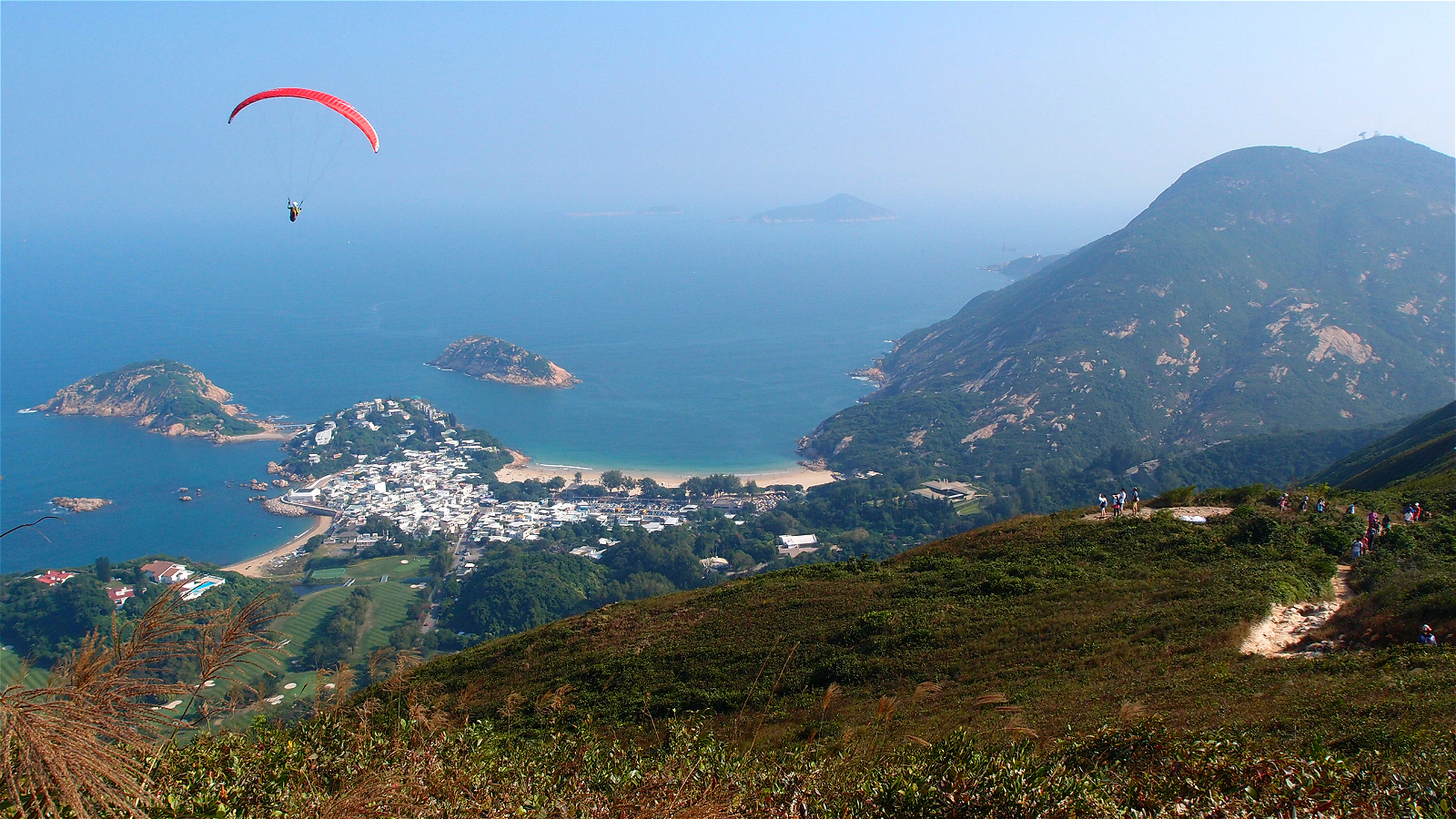
- Shek O as viewed from Dragon's Back
- Traditional Chinese: 石澳
- Simplified Chinese: 石澳
- Cantonese Yale: Sehk'ou
- Literal meaning: "Rocky Bay"
Transcriptions
Standard Mandarin
- Hanyu Pinyin: Shí'ào
- Gwoyeu Romatzyh: Shyr'aw
- IPA: [ʂɻ̩̌.âʊ]
Yue: Cantonese
- Yale Romanization: Sehk'ou
- Jyutping: Sek6ou3
- IPA: [sɛ̀ːk̚.ōu]

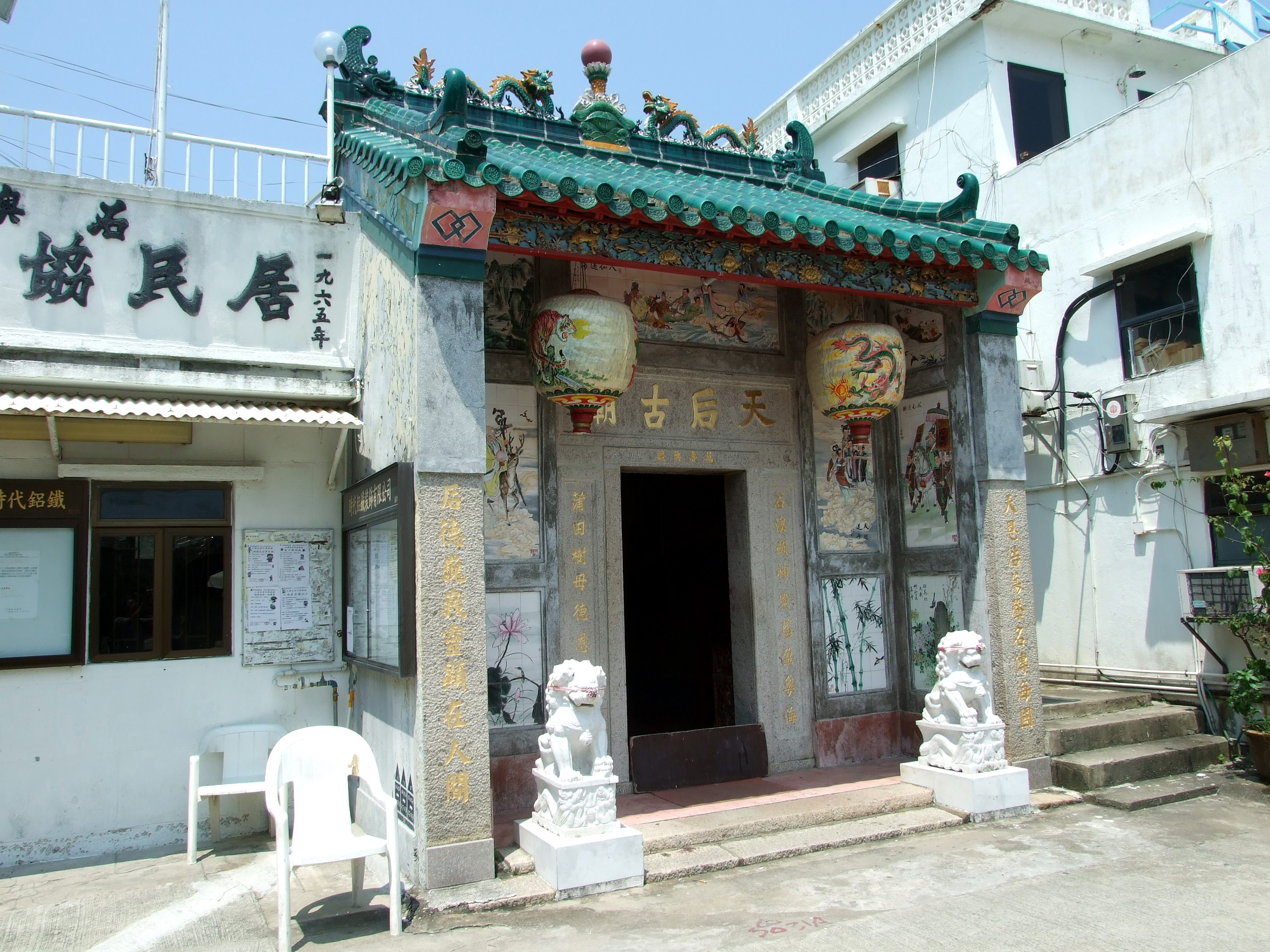
Tin Hau Temple in Shek O Village

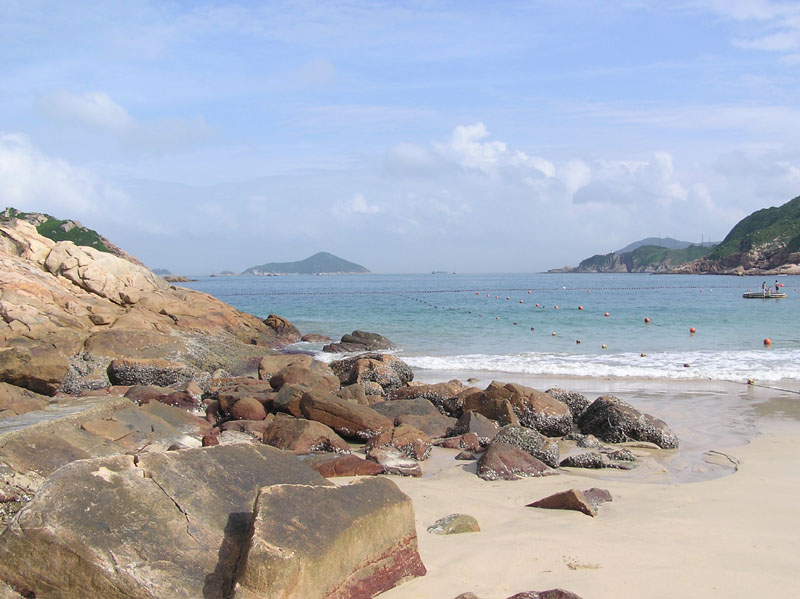
Shek O Beach facing the South China Sea. Sung Kong (宋崗), one of the Po Toi Islands, is visible in the distance.

Shek O is an area of the south-eastern part of Hong Kong Island, in Hong Kong. It can refer to Shek O village, Shek O Peninsula or Shek O Headland. Administratively, they are part of Southern District.

== Geography ==
The name Shek O literally means the "rocky bay". The entire area is a peninsula on the southern coast of the Hong Kong Island, facing the South China Sea. Shek O is surrounded by Shek O Country Park, Big Wave Bay and Cape D'Aguilar.

== Shek O Village ==
Shek O Village (石澳村) has a history of around 200 years. It was established by fishermen of the Chan, Yip, Li and Lau clans and was once famous for its lobster. The majority of the population previously lived on the land presently occupied by the Shek O country Club, from where it was forcibly removed. In 1841, Shek O Village as a whole, together with Hok Tsui Village (鶴咀村) and Tai Long Wan Village (大浪灣村), had a population of around 200.

The Tin Hau Temple in Shek O Village was built in 1891. It is a Grade III historic building, and its management has been delegated by the Chinese Temples Committee to the Shek O Residents Association. The memorial archway near the main entrance road to the town is inscribed with the calligraphy of R.C. Lee (利銘澤) (1905–1983).

The modernist Shek O Bus Terminus building next door was constructed in 1955 and designed by Hsin Yieh Architects, founded by Chinese architect Su Gin Djih (徐敬直). However, the earliest bus service to Shek O dates back to the 1920s, when the Hong Kong and Shanghai Hotels Limited operated a bus route between the Hong Kong Hotel and Big Wave Bay in Shek O.

== Outdoor activities ==
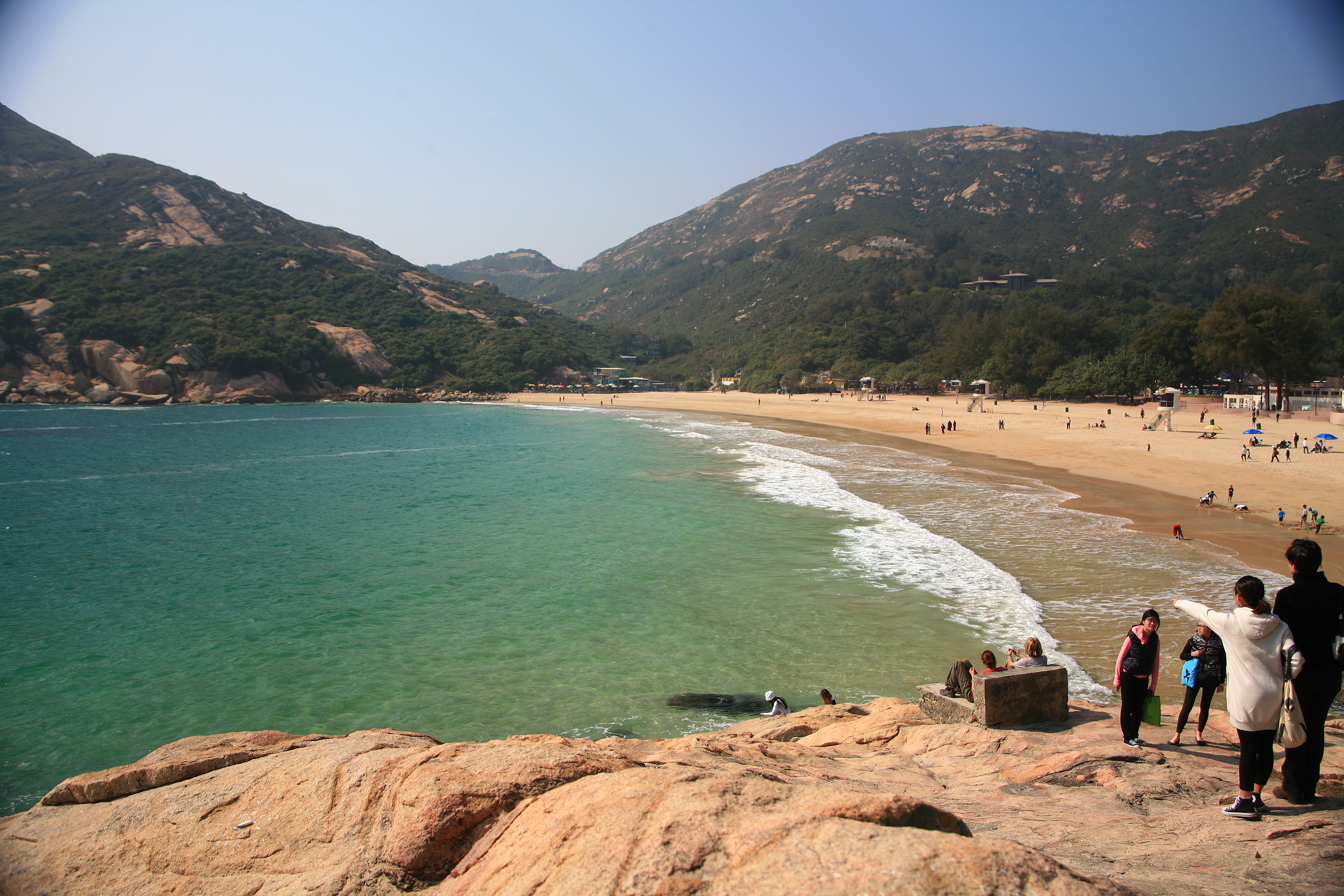
Shek O Beach

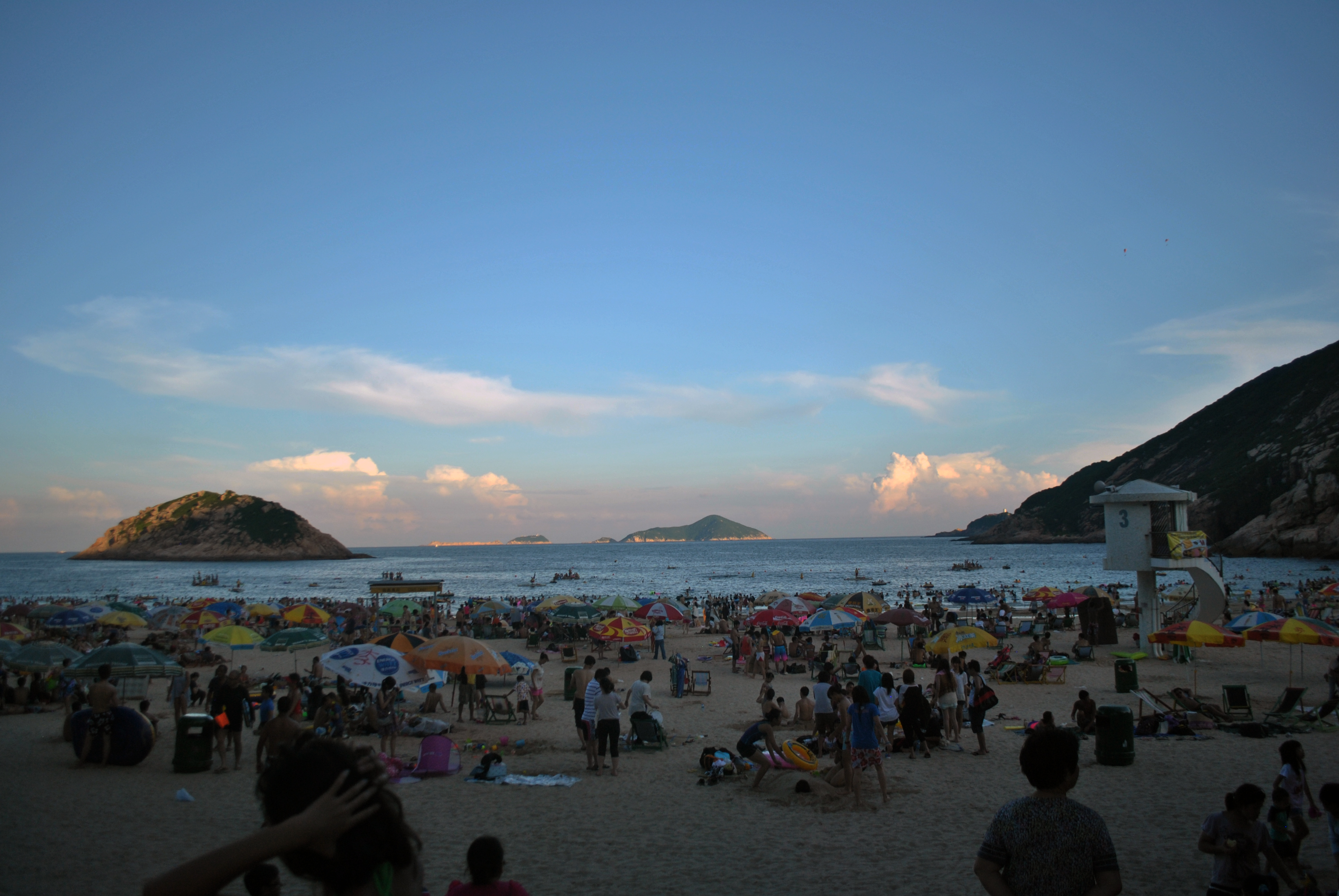
Shek O Beach during a Sunday dawn

Shek O Beach is a sandy public beach at Shek O. The water quality is fair and is gazetted Grade 2. It is a popular weekend and holiday destination, offering a public barbecue area and many restaurants. The rocky cliffs provide an excellent place for sports climbing.

Around one mile north of Shek O beach, after passing the Shek O Country Club, is Big Wave Bay. As its name suggests, big waves roll on to the beach, propelled by the wind, making it a popular destination for surfers. Wind surfers can be found in the sea off Big Wave Bay and Shek O beaches. The Dragon's Back above Shek O is home to Hong Kong Island's only paragliding site. Paragliders can be seen riding the lift and landing at the nearby Rocky Bay. Big Wave Bay Beach is also the site of prehistoric rock carving similar to those found on Cheung Chau Island.

Both beaches have basic bars and restaurants, and equipment hire, such as body boards and lilos. In addition, Shek O Beach has a small golf course.

Due to the isolated location of Shek O, the environment near the beach remains rustic and quiet, which is one of the area's main attractions.

The Shek O Country Club (石澳鄉村俱樂部) is built around a par 65 private golf course. Its history goes back to 1919. The construction of the Clubhouse was completed in 1925.

=== Golf ===
Shek O Country Club is a private golf club sitting on the Shek O peninsula with a history dating back to 1921. The course is short, playing to a par 65, with no par 5s and only two par 4s measuring over 350 yards.

=== Drownings ===
Shek O Beach has been noted as generally suffering from the highest drowning rate among Hong Kong's beaches, although this is not reflected in official statistics as the Leisure and Cultural Services Department (LCSD) only records incidents which occur while lifeguards are on duty. Residents estimated nine drowning deaths at the beach in 2011, and seven in 2012, figures which were not disputed by the LCSD. The high rate of accidents at the beach has been attributed to its high patronage, usually strong waves, the steep underwater slope of the beach, swimmer inexperience and poor public awareness of water safety principles.

== In popular culture ==
The scenery of Shek O is the setting of numerous Cantopop music videos. The Hong Kong director Stephen Chow's 1999 film King of Comedy (喜劇之王) was also shot at Shek O.

== Transportation ==
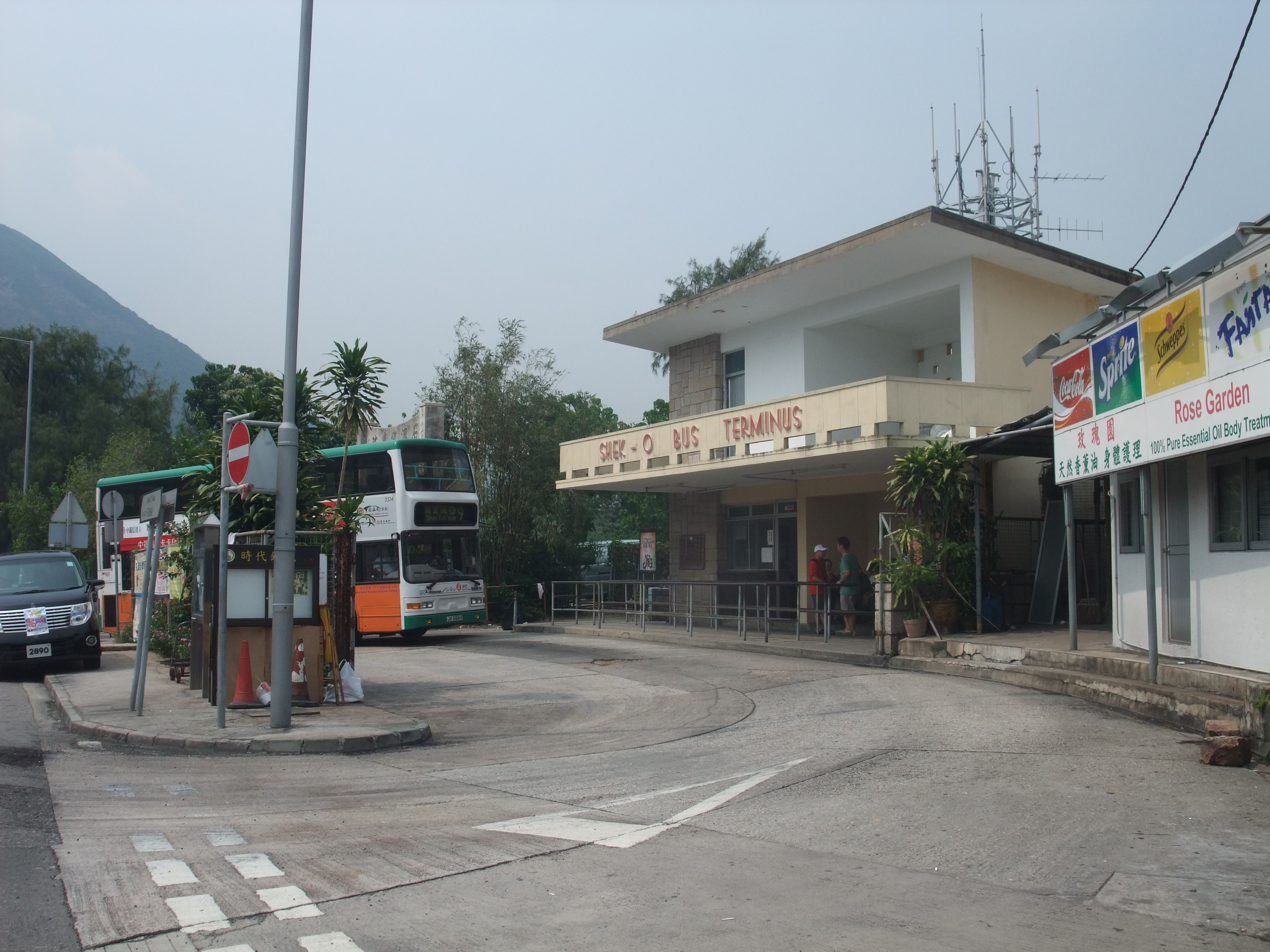
Shek O Bus Terminus

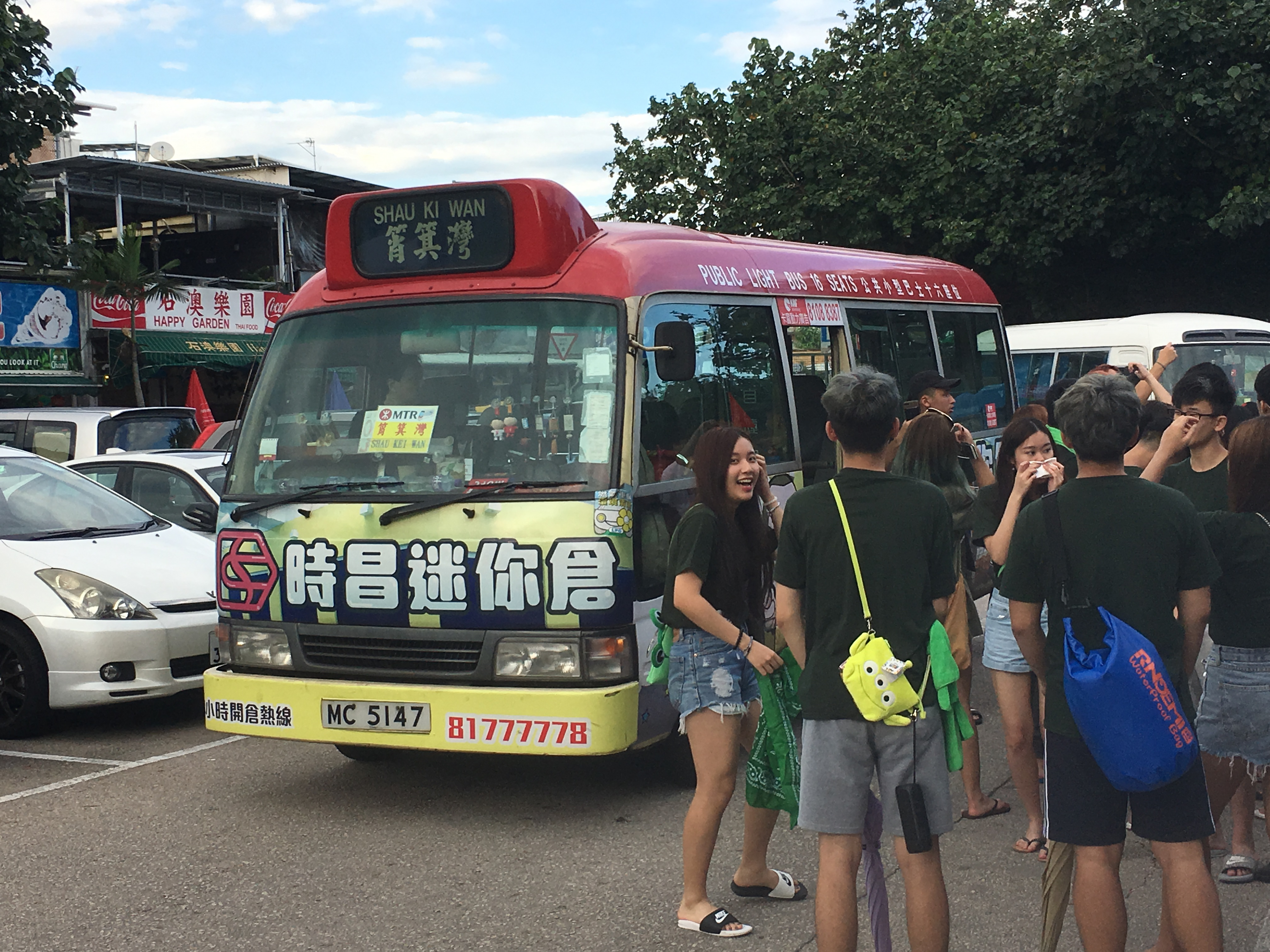
Red minibuses between Shau Kei Wan and Shek O

Shek O is served by Shek O Road, which connects Tai Tam Road to Stanley and Chai Wan. There is public transport link toward Shek O Beach: bus route 9 and red minibuses from Shau Kei Wan. There is limited parking near the beach.

== Education ==
Shek O is in Primary One Admission (POA) School Net 16. Within the school net are multiple aided schools (operated independently but funded with government money) and two government schools: Shau Kei Wan Government Primary School and Aldrich Bay Government Primary School.
