= Shek O Peak =

Hill in Hong Kong

- 打爛埕頂山
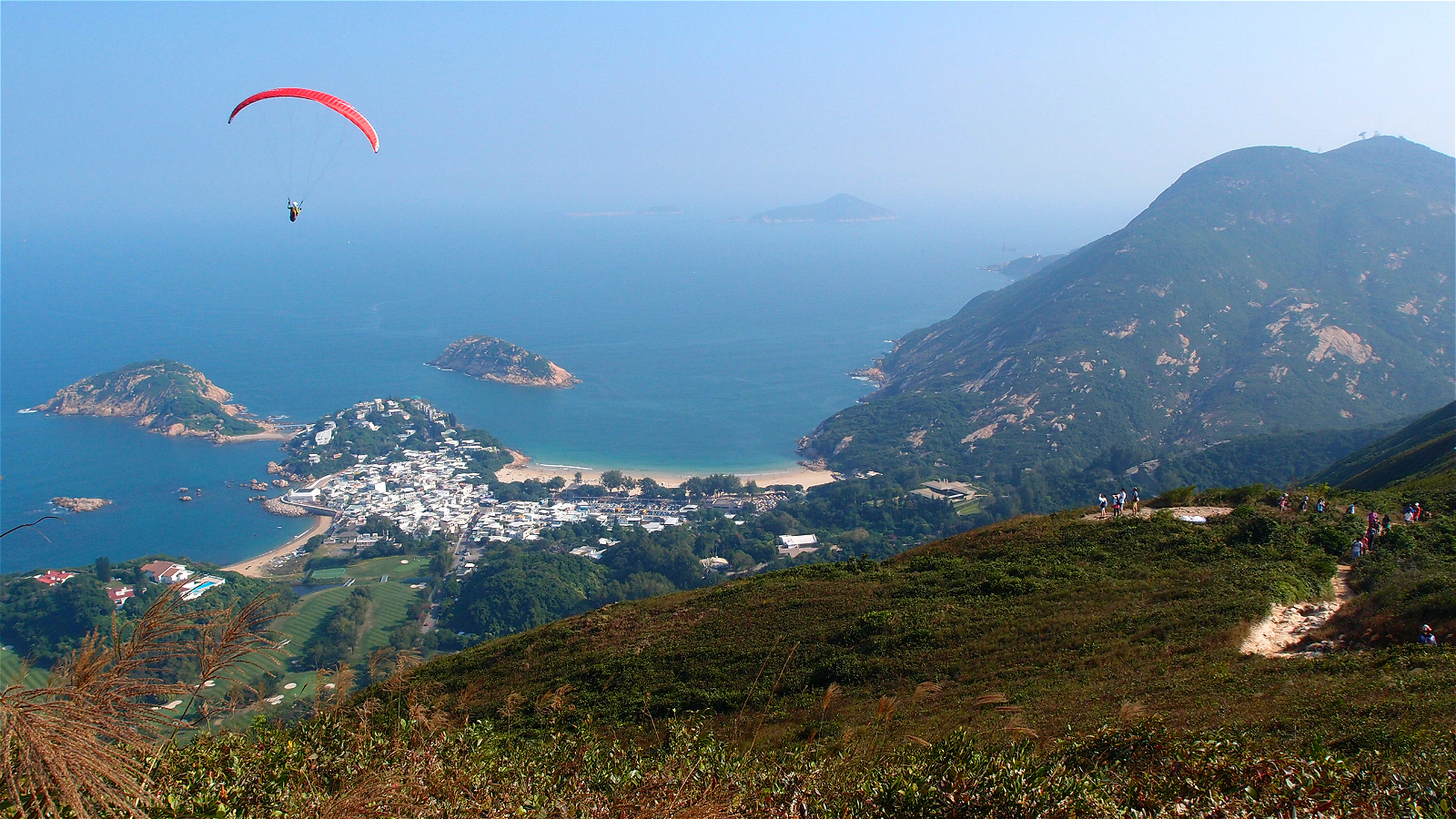
- View of Shek O from Shek O Peak's summit

Highest point
- Elevation: 284 m (932 ft)
- Coordinates: 22°14′8.57″N 114°14′37.33″E

Geography
- Location within Hong Kong
- Location: Hong Kong

Shek O Peak
- Traditional Chinese: 爛埕頂山
- Simplified Chinese: 烂埕顶山
Transcriptions
Standard Mandarin
- Hanyu Pinyin: Làn Chéng Dǐng Shān
Yue: Cantonese
- Jyutping: laan6 cing4 ding2 saan1

Shek O Peak
- Chinese: 石澳山
Transcriptions
Standard Mandarin
- Hanyu Pinyin: Shí Ào Shān
Yue: Cantonese
- Jyutping: sek6 ou3 saan1

Shek O Peak or Ta Lan Tsing Teng Shan (Chinese: 打爛埕頂山) is a hill in southern Hong Kong. It is the tallest hill along the Dragon's Back trail.

== Geography ==
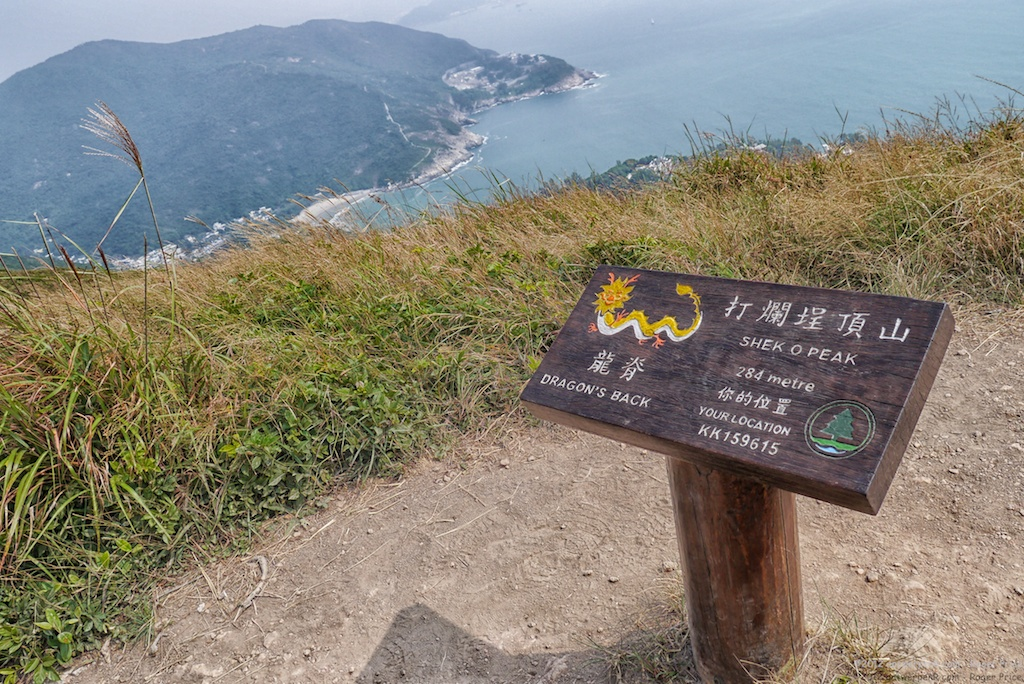
Summit of Shek O Peak

Shek O Peak is 284m in height. To the south lies another hill called D'Aguilar Peak.

== Access ==
Section 8 of the Hong Kong Trail runs through the top ridge of Shek O Peak. It is possible to access the summit of Shek O Peak after hiking for about 30 minutes from the To Tei Wan bus stop on Shek O Road.

== See also ==
- List of mountains, peaks and hills in Hong Kong
- Dragon's Back
