= Tai Tam Road =

Road in Hong Kong Island, Hong Kong

Coordinates: 22.22740°N 114.21733°E

- Chinese: 大潭道
Transcriptions
Standard Mandarin
- Hanyu Pinyin: Dàtán Dào
Yue: Cantonese
- Yale Romanization: Daaih tàahm douh
- Jyutping: Daai6 taam4 dou6

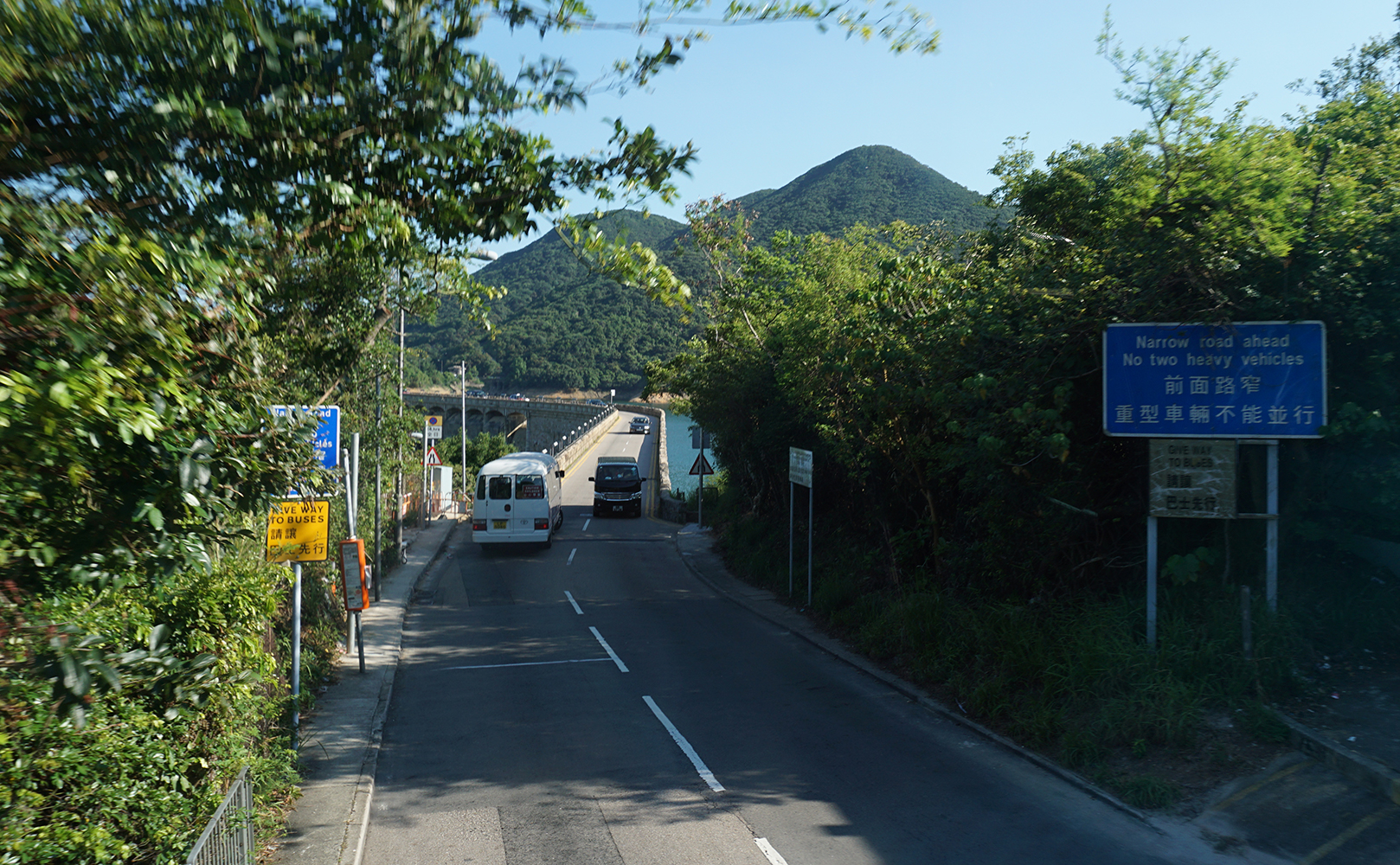
Tai Tam Road near Tai Tam Tuk Reservoir

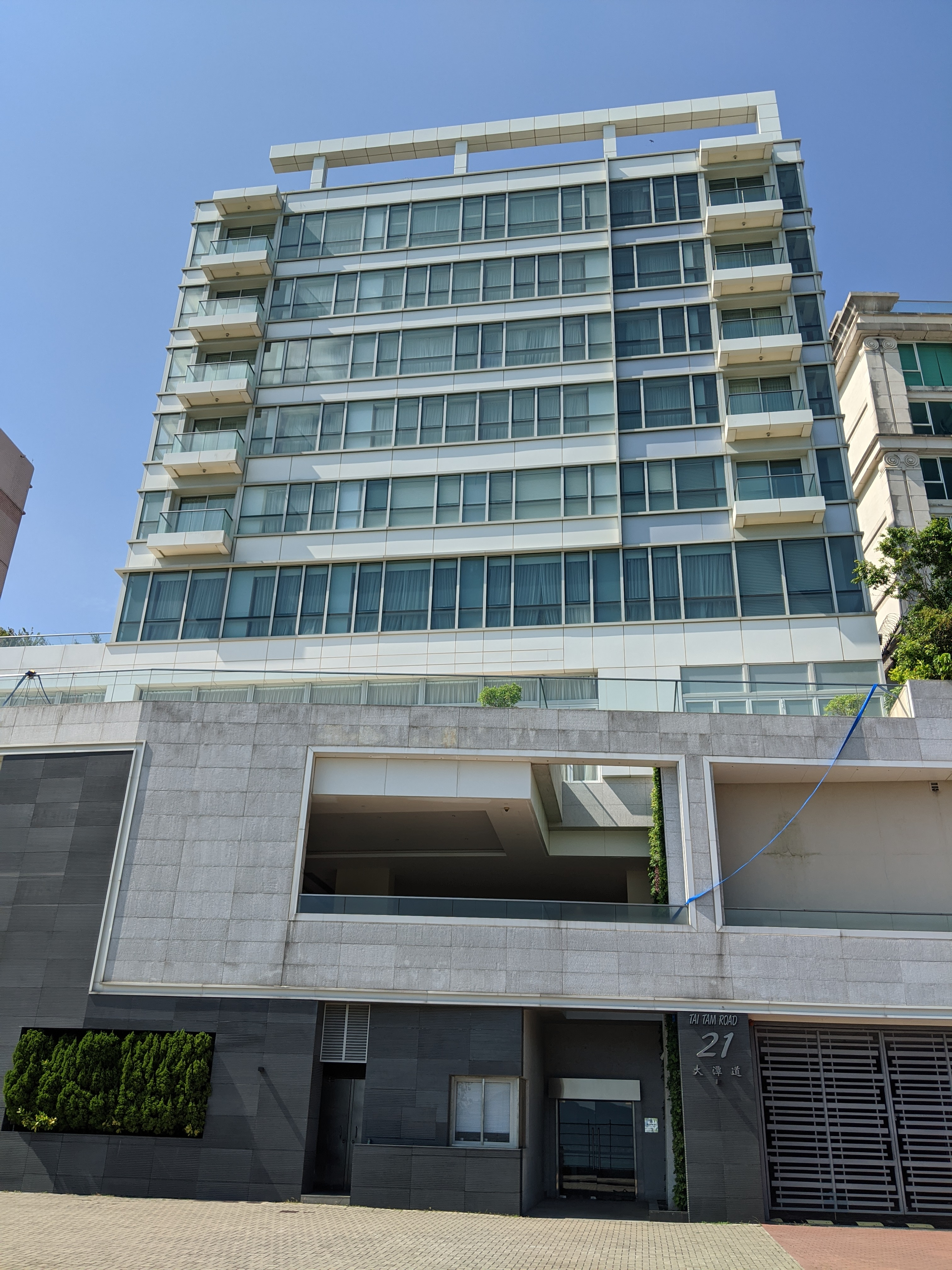
21 Tai Tam Road, Senior staff residences of the Hong Kong Liaison Office

Tai Tam Road in Hong Kong links the districts of Chai Wan and Stanley on Hong Kong Island. This road connects Chai Wan Road, the northern end of Shek O Road, Turtle Cove, Tai Tam and Stanley. The Tai Tam Tuk Reservoir's dam constitutes a section of the road that is particularly narrow.

The dam was used to feature two-way traffic, which was problematic when buses crossed ways with other bigger vehicles, causing heavy congestion. On 25 August 2018, a new traffic light system was installed on the 400m dam, fixing the problem by allowing only one direction of traffic on the dam section at a time. This smart traffic light solution was designed and developed by an Engineering professor from the Chinese University of Hong Kong.

An old bridge, Pak Chai Old Bridge, built in 1845, is also situated near the road, it was the predecessor of the current New Bridge in Tai Tam.

Tai Tam Road is one of the two roads that links Tai Tam and the urban district. The other road is Repulse Bay Road. Most importantly, Tai Tam Road is the sole link for glorious developments like the Redhill Peninsula, to the urban core, or vice versa, as the Redhill zone is high in economic activities and is very rich.

== Notable addresses ==
- 21 Tai Tam Road - Senior staff residences of the Hong Kong Liaison Office
- 28 Tai Tam Road - American Club Hong Kong, Country Club

== Intersecting Roads ==
Roads are listed East to West.

- Chai Wan Road
- Shek O Road
- Tai Tam Reservoir Road
- Pak Pat Shan Road
- Stanley Gap Road and Stanley Village Road

== See also ==
- List of streets and roads in Hong Kong
