= Hong Kong Trail =

Long-distance footpath on Hong Kong Island

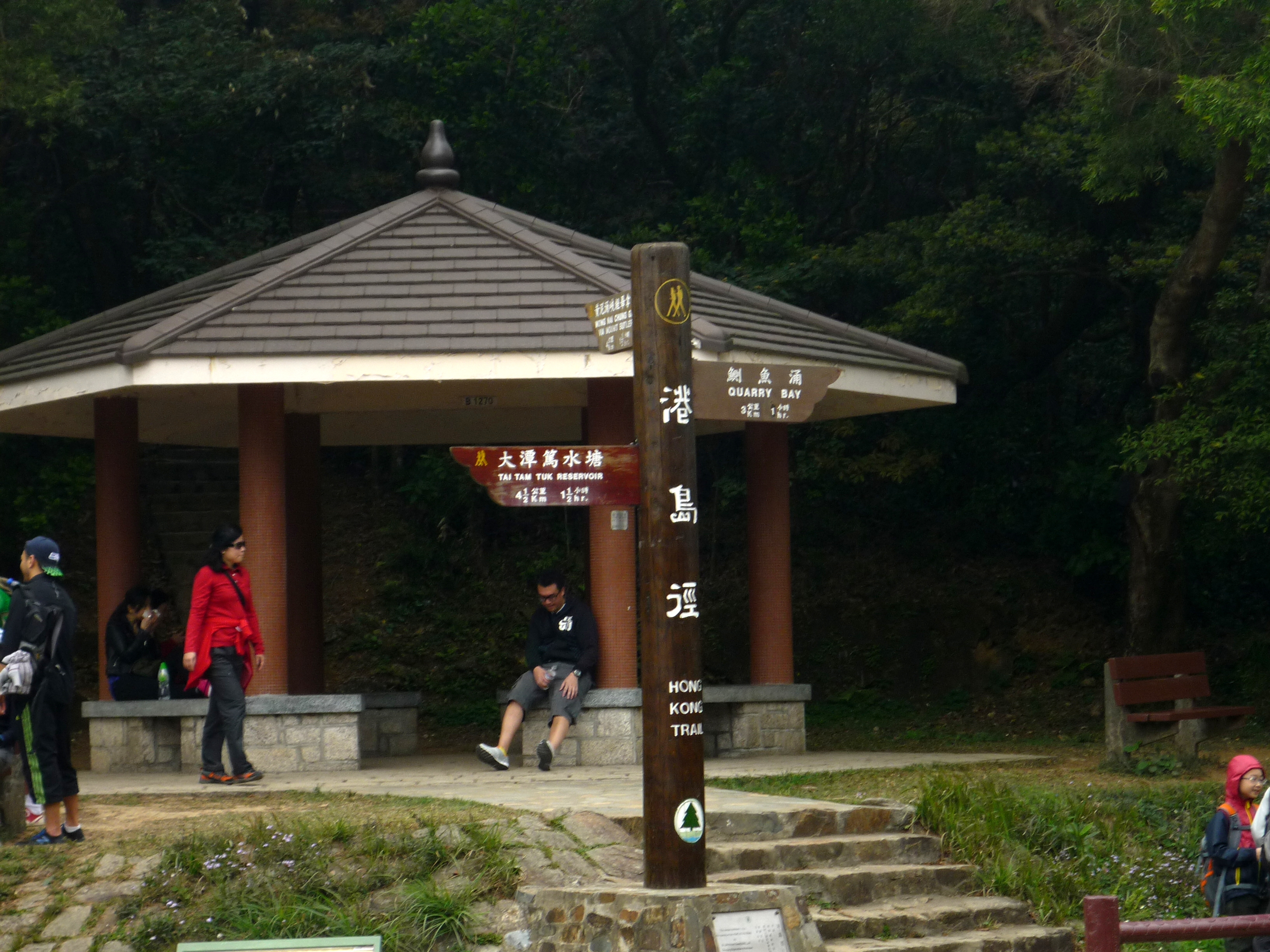
- Hong Kong Trail at Quarry Gap, in 2013
- Length: 50 kilometres (31 miles)
- Location: Hong Kong
- Elevation gain/loss: 3,031 m (9,944 ft)
- Difficulty: Medium

Map overview

Hong Kong Trail
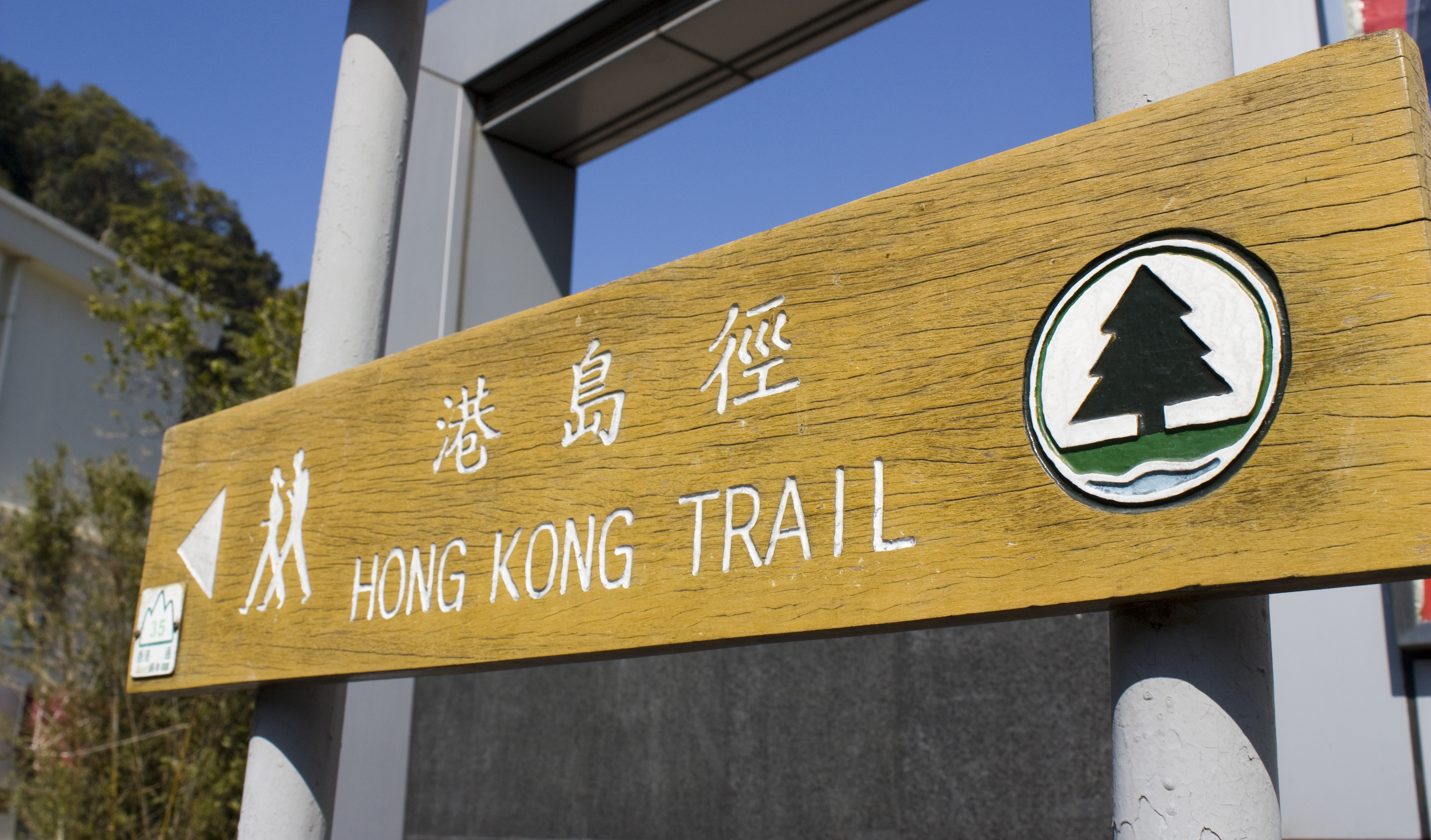
- Starting point of the Hong Kong Trail at The Peak, Hong Kong Island
- Traditional Chinese: 港島徑
- Simplified Chinese: 港岛径
- Cantonese Yale: Góng dóu ging
Transcriptions
Standard Mandarin
- Hanyu Pinyin: Gǎngdǎojìng
Yue: Cantonese
- Yale Romanization: Góng dóu ging
- Jyutping: Gong2 dou2 ging3

The Hong Kong Trail, opened in 1985, is a long-distance footpath from Victoria Peak to Big Wave Bay on Hong Kong Island. It is a 50-kilometre (31 mi) walking route which passes through the five country parks on Hong Kong island. The trail is extremely popular with local residents for its unique combination of well-marked paths (with reassuring trail markers every half-kilometre) through verdant woods that offer relief from the sun on sunny days, and featuring numerous streams and waterfalls. The trail offers a wide variety of terrain — it can be steep at some parts, flat at others, with both gradual ascents and descents. The trail takes a very indirect route; termination points Victoria Peak and Big Wave Bay are less than 11 km apart. Because the trail is composed of eight sections, much shorter runs or hikes are possible. The popular running path on Bowen Road connects to both Sections 3 and 4 via the steep ascent up the Wan Chai Gap Trail. The best detailed guidebook, which breaks down each of the eight sections with detailed notes, maps and photos, is The Serious Hikers Guide to Hong Kong (the book also outlines three other 50 km+ hiking trails in Hong Kong — the Wilson, the Maclehose, and the 70-km long trail that circumnavigates Lantau Island. In 2013, Hong Kong Trail was awarded the 10th best city hiking trail in the world by Lonely Planet.

== Stages ==
The Hong Kong Trail is divided into eight sections:

Section	Route	Length (km)	Time (hr)	Difficulty	Starting Markers	Ending Markers
1	The Peak → Pok Fu Lam Reservoir	7.0	2.0	2/3 stars	H001	H014
2	Pok Fu Lam Reservoir → Peel Rise	4.5	1.5	2/3 stars	H015	H025
3	Peel Rise → Wan Chai Gap	6.5	1.75	2/3 stars	H026	H037
4	Wan Chai Gap → Wong Nai Chung Gap Road	7.5	2.0	1/3 stars	H038	H050
5	Wong Nai Chung Gap Road → Mount Parker Road	4.0	1.5	3/3 stars	H051	H059
6	Mount Parker Road → Tai Tam Road	4.5	1.5	1/3 stars	H060	H068
7	Tai Tam Road → To Tei Wan	7.5	2.0	1/3 stars	H068	H084
8	To Tei Wan → Tai Long Wan (Big Wave Bay)	8.5	2.75	3/3 stars	H084	H100

Easy Walk
Fairly Difficult
Very Difficult

== Green Power Hike ==
The Green Power Hike is a 46-km walk and running race along the 50 km Hong Kong Trail hosted by Green Power Hong Kong during February each year. Income from the Green Power Hike funds local environmental education in schools and the community. Green Power is an independent green organization which receives no Government subvention and is financed by public membership fees, sponsorships and donations.

== Rainbow Trek ==
The Rainbow Trek is a team race run during October or November each year. Teams of four must complete the 50 km trail together, though there is a mandatory 30 minute rest period after the first 25 km. Initiated in 2005, the trek seeks to raise funds for the Rainbow Project, a local based charity trying to improve education facilities for autistic children in the territory.

== Trail Walker @ HKU ==
Trail Walker @ HKU is a challenge tailored for over 300 HKU students in teams of 4. Organized annually by General Education Unit of HKU with support of Mr Panda Lee from 2002, it holds the record of only trail walk activity with no garbage left behind. The trail walk aims to challenge students to rediscover qualities like resilience, endurance, courage and team spirit. A briefing session is held one month prior to on-day to provide practical information for students' better preparation. The Trail Walk will span a full day starting at 8 am on a weekend in November, starts from Big Wave Bay and finishes at HKU.

== See also ==
- List of long-distance footpaths in Hong Kong
- Dragon's Back, part of Stage 8 of Hong Kong Trail.
- Wilson Trail
