= Shek O Beach =

Beach in Hong Kong Island, Hong Kong

- Beach
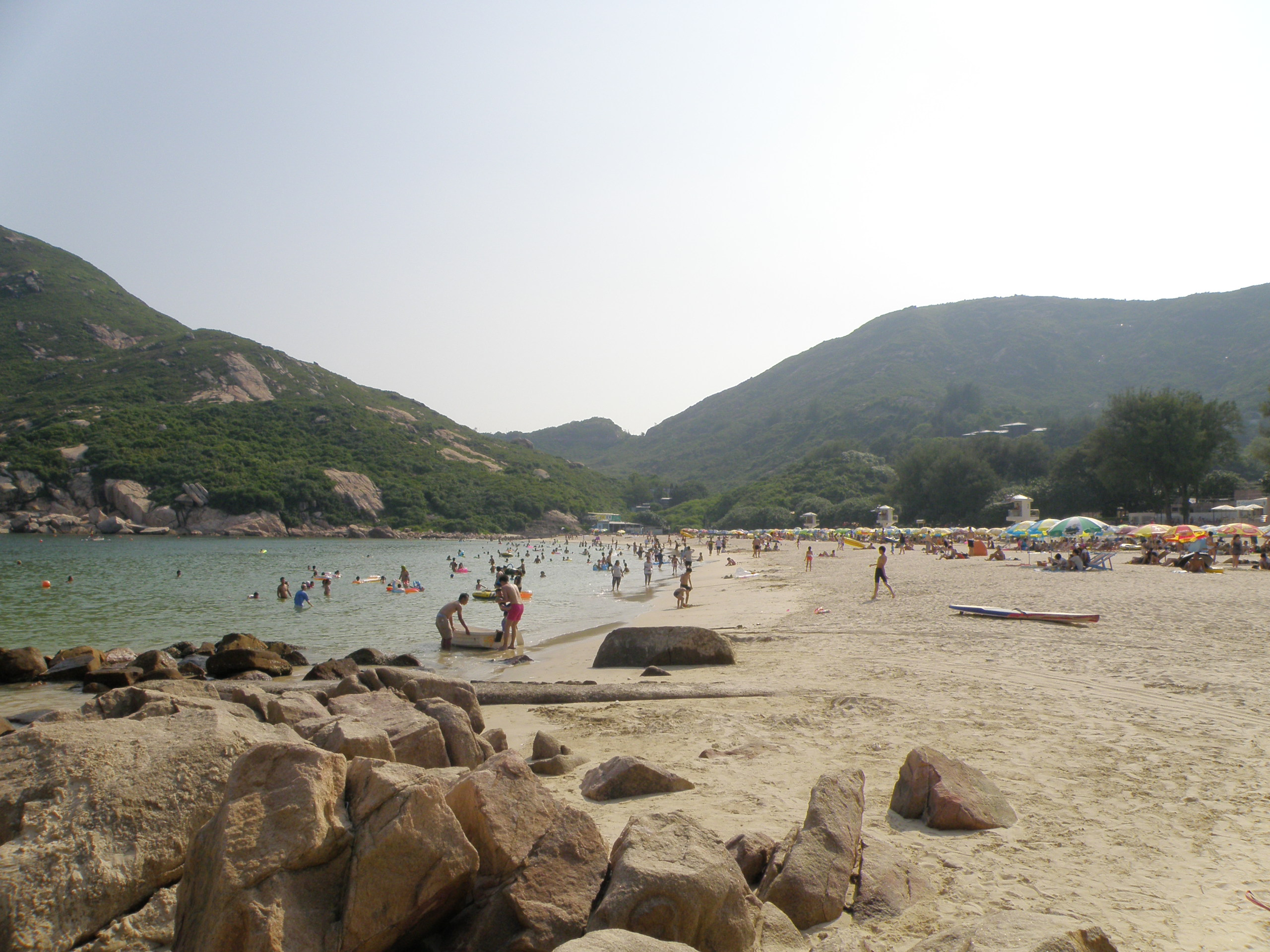
- Shek O Beach

- Location within Hong Kong
- Coordinates: 22.228796°N 114.250859°E
- Location: Shek O, Hong Kong Island

Dimensions
  - Length: 230 m (750 ft)
- Patrolled by: Leisure and Cultural Services Department

Shek O Beach
- Traditional Chinese: 石澳泳灘
- Simplified Chinese: 石澳泳滩
Transcriptions
Standard Mandarin
- Hanyu Pinyin: Shí Ào Yǒng Tān
Yue: Cantonese
- Jyutping: sek6 ou3 wing6 taan1

Shek O Beach is a gazetted beach located facing Island Bay in Shek O, Southern District, Hong Kong. The beach has barbecue pits and is managed by the Leisure and Cultural Services Department of the Hong Kong Government. The beach is about 230 metres long and is rated as Grade 1 by the Environmental Protection Department for its water quality.

== History ==
On 25 October 2014, a 60-year-old man was found lying on the shore after being drowned while swimming near the beach. The police and the ambulance had arrived at the scene and confirmed that the man had died.

On 18 November 2018, a 12-year-old girl drowned while swimming near the beach. She was rescued by a swimmer and was accompanied by her male relative and her friend to Pamela Youde Nethersole Eastern Hospital for treatment.

On 19 May 2019, a 69-year-old woman drowned while swimming near the beach. She was unconscious when she was rescued by lifeguards and was taken an ambulance to the hospital, where she was certified dead.

On 25 November 2020, Li, a 14-year-old Form Two boy of Shau Kei Wan East Government Secondary School, died after being drowned while playing in the water with seven other classmates on the beach.

== Usage ==
The rocky cliffs on the beach provide an excellent place for sports climbing, and the beach offers views of Ng Fan Chau in Island Bay.

== Features ==
The beach has the following features:

- BBQ pits (39 nos.)
- Changing rooms
- Showers
- Toilets
- Car park
- Light refreshment restaurant
- Water sports centre
- Playground
- Obstacle golf course

== See also ==
- Beaches of Hong Kong
