= Bowen Road =

Road in Hong Kong

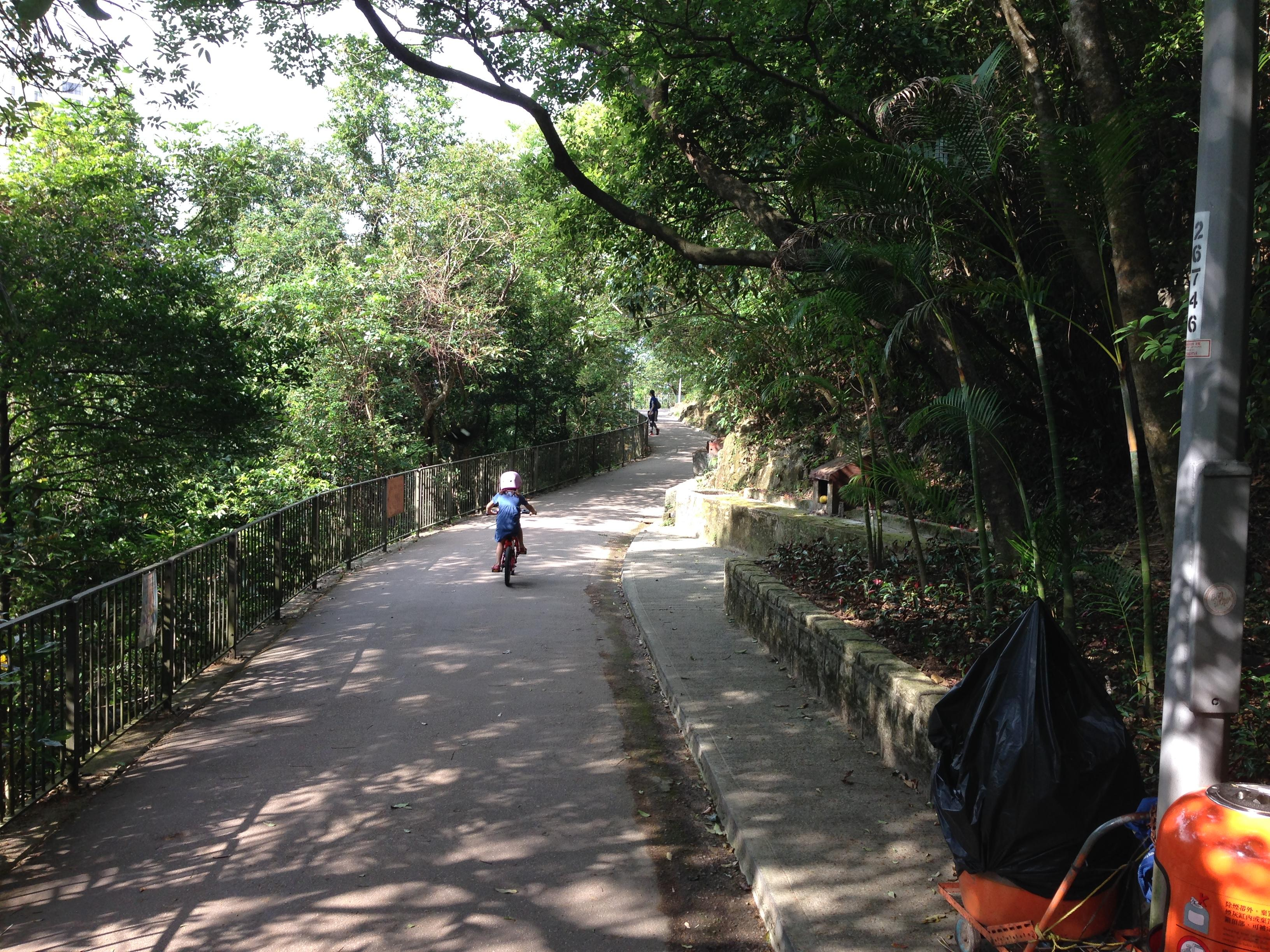
- Bowen Road
- Interactive map of Bowen Road
- Native name: 寶雲道 (Yue Chinese)
- Location: Mid-Levels, Hong Kong
- Coordinates: 22.27103°N 114.17383°E
- From: Magazine Gap Road
- To: Junction of Stubbs Road, Tai Hang Road and Wong Nai Chung Gap Road

Bowen Road
- Traditional Chinese: 寶雲道
- Yale Romanization: Bóu wàhn douh
- Jyutping: Bow^{2} wan^{4} dou^{6}

Bowen Road (Chinese: 寶雲道; Jyutping: bou2 wan4 dou6) is a road from the Mid-Levels to Wong Nai Chung Gap of Hong Kong Island, on the slope above Central, Wan Chai and Happy Valley in Hong Kong. Bowen Road starts from Magazine Gap Road near the rail of Peak Tram and ends at the junction with Stubbs Road, Tai Hang Road and Wong Nai Chung Gap Road.

Today the road is a popular route for joggers and dog walkers.

== History ==
The road was named after Sir George Bowen, an Ulsterman who served as the 9th Governor of Hong Kong from 1883 to 1885. It was colloquially called "Third Road" by residents in Hong Kong for being the third east–west road from the shore at that time. "First Road" and "Second Road" were Queen's Road and Kennedy Road respectively.

As Hong Kong lacked fresh water at that time, Tai Tam Reservoir was built in Tai Tam Valley. An aqueduct was built to transfer from Tai Tam to Central via Wong Nai Chung Gap and Happy Valley. Later, Bowen Road was built on top of the aqueducts. The road makes the south boundary of Victoria City. A boundary stone was at the junction with Stubbs Road. The road also passes by many schools.

== Lover's Stone ==
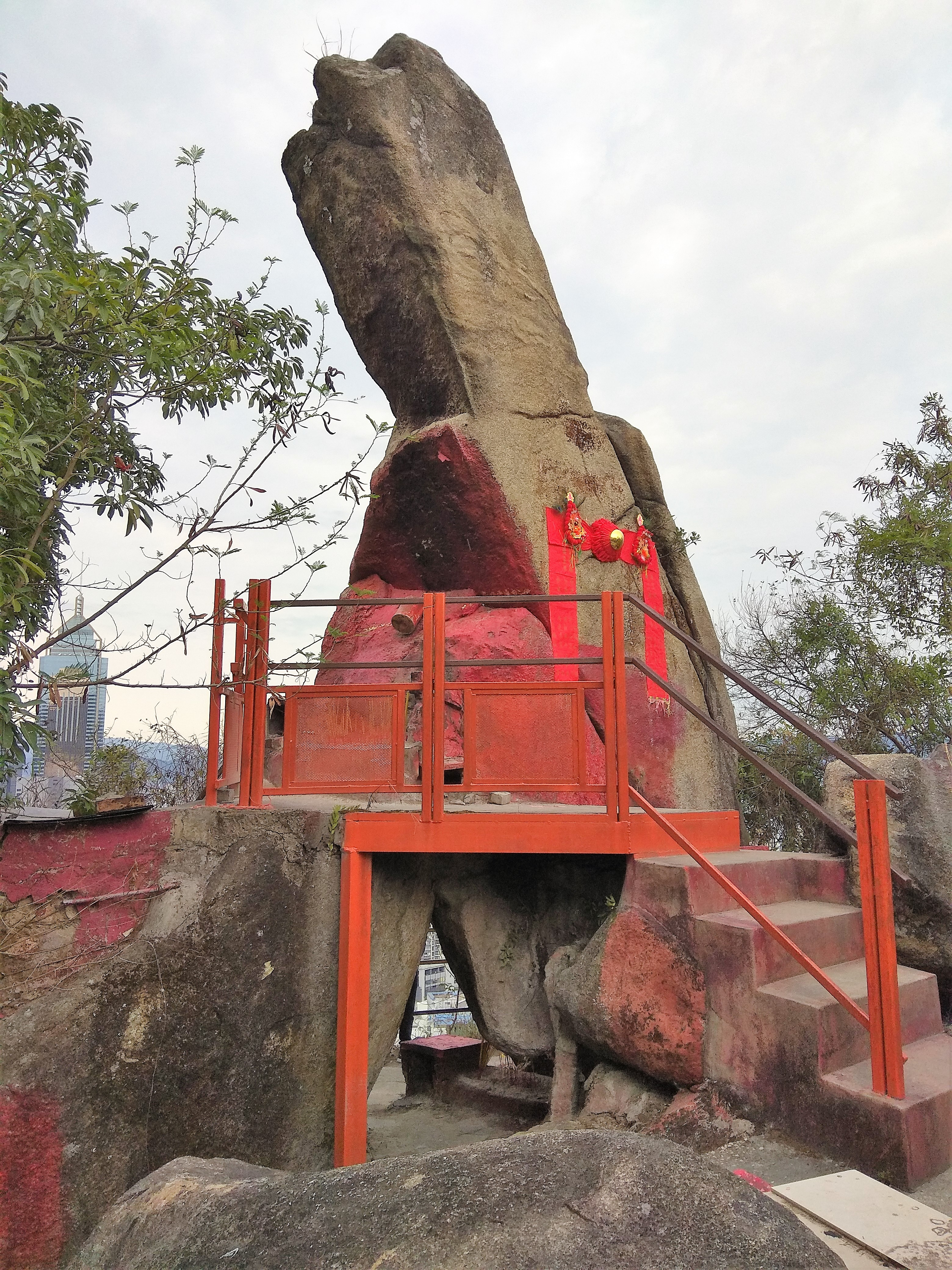
Lover's Stone

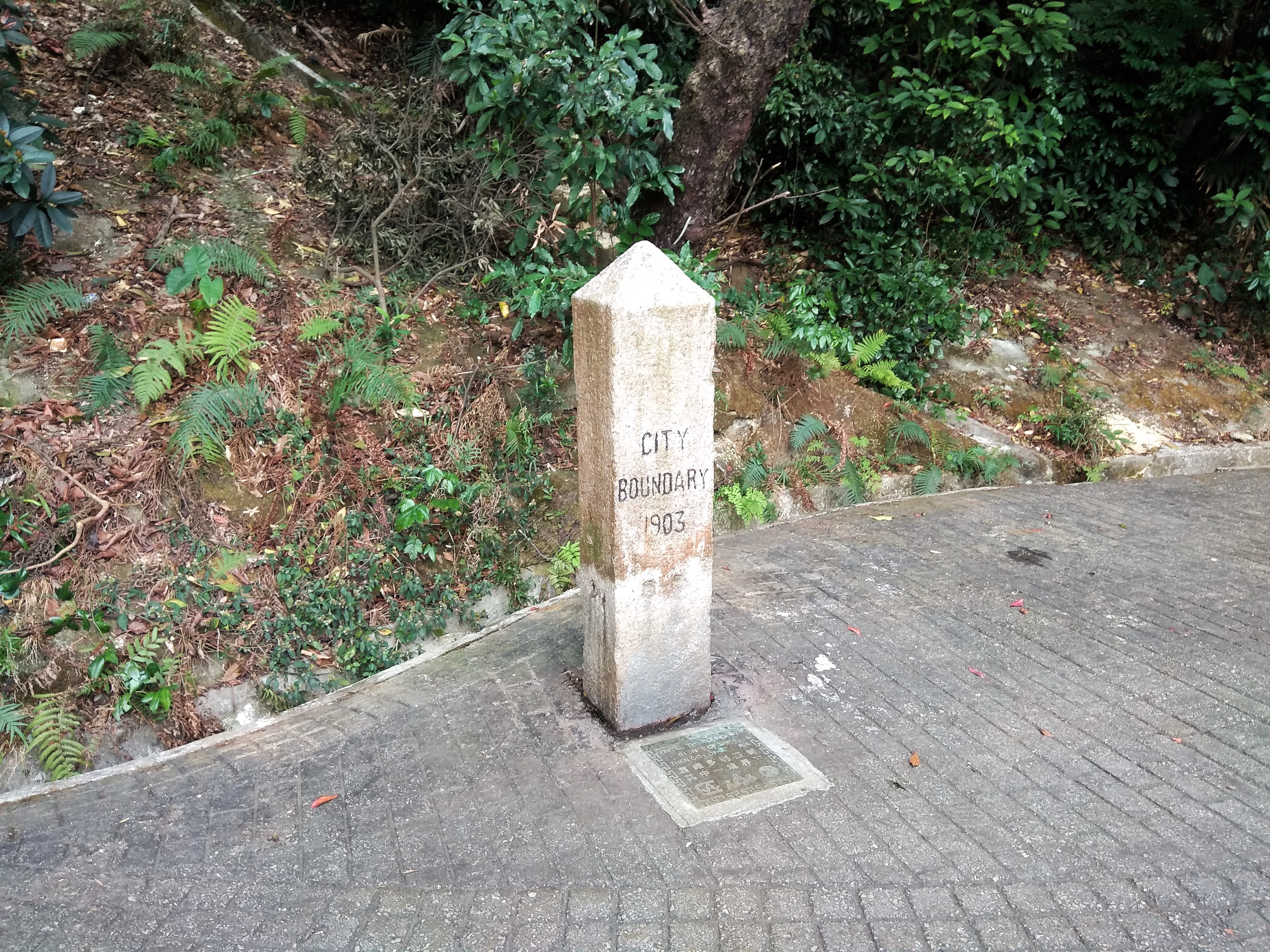
Victoria City boundary stone along Bowen Road.

Lover's Stone is located just off the road, around 20 minutes walking time from Stubbs Road. The 9-metre-high granite monolith is said to have the power of giving happy marriages for those who worshipped it. It is also a nice place to view Victoria Harbour's scenery.

== Dog poisonings ==
Bowen Road is also infamous as the site of a serial animal killer. The scenic views and rambles make Bowen Road extremely popular with dog walkers, particularly among Hong Kong's expatriate community. Since 1989 (to end of October 2009), there have been 72 cases of dog poisoning in the area, and 22 dogs have been killed by eating poisoned chicken. The last British governor of Hong Kong, Chris Patten, also nearly fell victim, with his Norfolk terrier Whisky made seriously ill from consumption of poisoned chicken.

Some have speculated that previous dog owners may have left their charges off leads and allowed them to defecate on the many Chinese graves that are accessible from Bowen Road, offending someone. Whatever the true motive, the killings have followed patterns with the killer (or possibly killers) leaving cooked chicken, covered in a commonly available – but very powerful – insecticide.

Local SPCA officials have advised Hong Kong residents to never allow their pets off a lead at any time in the area, and to always be cautious about letting their dogs sniff or eat in the area.

Hong Kong police believe the elusive killer is at work again. On the 12 October 2008, the SPCA sent specialists to the Peak where a dog was poisoned. The reward has been upped from HK$30,000 to HK$150,000.

Another dog died in one of two poisonings in a week in December 2010.

A copycat killer may have appeared on nearby Lamma Island. At least 6 dogs have been poisoned by contaminated roadside meat in the fall of 2011.

== See also ==
- List of streets and roads in Hong Kong
