= Dutch Lane =

Hiking trail in Hong Kong

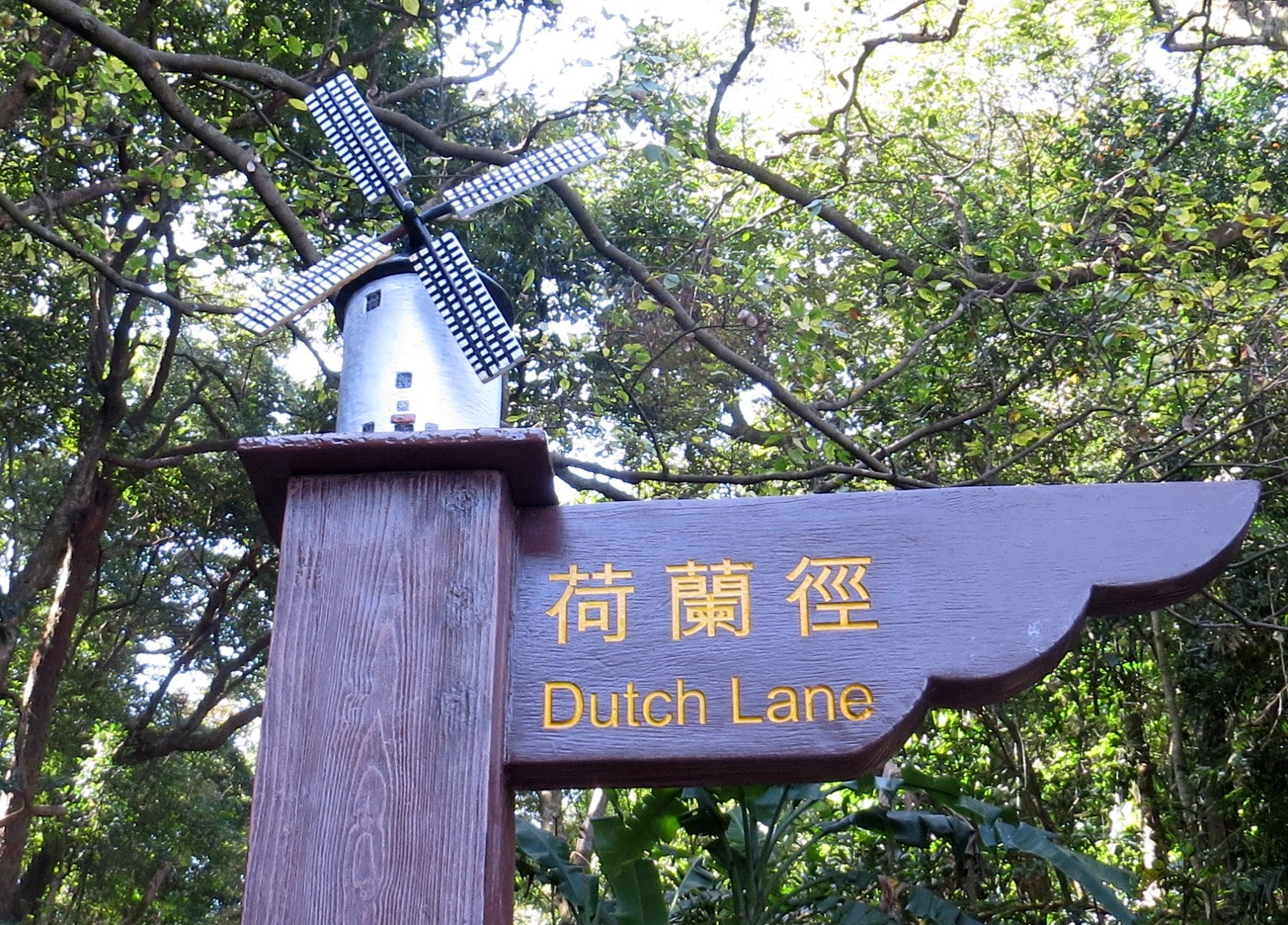
Dutch Lane sign near Wan Chai Gap Road

Dutch Lane (Chinese: 荷蘭徑), also known as Hollandse Laan, is a quiet and lesser-known 1.5km long hiking trail located above Bowen Road (寶雲道) and below Peak Road (山頂道). It connects Wan Chai Gap (near Stubbs Road, 司徒拔道) and Magazine Gap Road (馬己仙峽道), near Magazine Gap Service Reservoir Playground (馬己仙峽配水庫遊樂場). Dutch Lane is very quiet and only used by very few hikers as most people in Hong Kong are not aware of it. It is an easy hike for experienced adults, but can be slightly difficult for children and the elderly, especially during the rainy season. Even for experienced hikers, it becomes challenging and adventurous during and after the typhoon.

Most of the trail is unmarked, with the exception of a small sign at the entrance to Wan Chai Gap, and the trail is not marked on early maps. This trail has many names. In addition to Dutch Lane and Hollandse Laan, it is also called Hor Lan Geng (荷蘭徑, lit. Holland Trail), Hor Lan Wan Geng (荷蘭灣徑, lit. Holland Bay Trail) and Dutch Seaman's Trail (荷蘭海員徑) because in the old days the Dutch used to walk from their living quarters provided by Java-China-Japan Lijn (JCJL, a Dutch shipping line) on Peak Road, along this trail to Wan Chai Gap and then went to the office. Legend has it that the area between Central and Ha Wan (now Wan Chai) was once called Hor Lan Wan (荷蘭灣, lit. Holland Bay or Dutch Bay); another legend claims that the bay was named after Dutch sailors who landed there. The trail was named after the scenery of Dutch Bay.
