= List of streets and roads in Hong Kong =

Streets and Roads in Hong Kong
- A map of all Routes in Hong Kong

System information
- Maintained by Transport Department

Highway names
- Routes: Route X

System links
- Transport in Hong Kong; Routes; Roads and Streets

The following are incomplete lists of expressways, tunnels, bridges, roads, avenues, streets, crescents, squares and bazaars in Hong Kong. Many roads on Hong Kong Island follow the contours of its hilly terrain. Some of the roads on the north side of Hong Kong Island and southern Kowloon have a grid-like pattern. The roads are generally designed to British standards, whilst expressways generally conform to British motorway standards.

Speed limits on all roads are 50 km/h (31 mph), unless indicated otherwise by road signs. Usually, higher speed limits, such as 70 and 80 km/h (43 and 50 mph), are applied to facilitate traffic flow along main roads and trunk roads. The speed limit on most expressways is between to 80 km/h and 100 km/h (62 mph) – and as high as 110 km/h (68 mph) on North Lantau Highway – due to the smooth contours of the roads, whilst other expressways, such as Island Eastern Corridor and Tuen Mun Road are restricted to 70 km/h due to their age and geometrical constraints. Typically, the highest speed limit in all tunnels and suspension bridges is 80 km/h, whilst the recommended speed limit on approaches to toll gates and slip roads which do not lead to other expressways is 50 km/h

== Routes ==
Hong Kong's Transport Department is responsible for management of road traffic, regulation of public transport services, and operation of major transport infrastructure, whilst the Highways Department is responsible for the planning, design, construction, and maintenance of the public road system.

In 2004, a new strategic route marking system was introduced, with most existing routes renumbered, and exits to key locations or other routes also numbered. For example, a journey from Yau Ma Tei to the airport uses Route 3, taking Exit 5 to join Route 8. It is therefore identified as "3-5-8".

Routes 1 to 3 are cross-harbour north–south routes following the order in which the harbour tunnels were opened. Routes 4, 5, 7, and 8 run east–west, and are numbered from south to north. Route 9 circumscribes the New Territories. Route 10 runs from the western New Territories from Route 9, and heads northwest across the Shenzhen Bay Bridge to the border with Shenzhen. However, the new system has caused some confusion to motorists who have become accustomed to relying on traditional destination signs.

The routes are designated as follows:

- Route 1: Aberdeen – Wong Chuk Hang – Aberdeen Tunnel – Causeway Bay – Cross-Harbour Tunnel – Kowloon Tong – Lion Rock Tunnel – Sha Tin (to join Route 9)
- Route 2: Taikoo Shing – Eastern Cross-Harbour Tunnel – Kwun Tong Bypass – Tate's Cairn Tunnel – Ma Liu Shui (to join Route 9)
- Route 3: Sai Ying Pun – Western Cross-Harbour Tunnel – West Kowloon Highway – Kwai Chung – Tsing Yi – Cheung Tsing Tunnel – Ting Kau Bridge – Tai Lam Tunnel – Yuen Long (to join Route 9)
- Route 4: Chai Wan – Island Eastern Corridor – Quarry Bay – Central-Wan Chai Bypass – Sheung Wan – Sai Ying Pun – Kennedy Town
- Route 5: Ngau Tau Kok – Kowloon Bay – Airport Tunnel – Hung Hom – Yau Ma Tei – Lai Chi Kok – Kwai Chung – Tsuen Wan (to join Route 9)
- Route 6: Reserved for future route. Proposed Central Kowloon Route – Proposed Southeast Kowloon T2 Route - Tseung Kwan O – Lam Tin Tunnel
- Route 7: Tseung Kwan O – Tseung Kwan O Tunnel – Kwun Tong – Wong Tai Sin – Sham Shui Po – Lai Chi Kok – Kwai Chung (to join Route 5)
- Route 8: Chek Lap Kok (Airport) – Tsing Ma Bridge – Tsing Yi – Stonecutters Island – Lai Chi Kok – Sha Tin (to join Route 9)
- Route 9: Shing Mun Tunnel – Tai Wai – Sha Tin – Ma Liu Shui – Tai Po – Fanling – Sheung Shui – San Tin – Yuen Long – Tuen Mun – Sham Tseng – Tsuen Wan
- Route 10: Shekou, Shenzhen — Lam Tei (to join Route 9)

== Expressways ==
There are approximately 158.7 kilometres (98.6 mi) of expressways in Hong Kong. The following list is sorted by length:

Number and Name	Length (km)	Speed limit (km/h)
Tuen Mun Road	16.2 kilometres (10.1 mi)	70/80
Hong Kong Link Road	13.2 kilometres (8.2 mi)	100
North Lantau Highway	12.8 kilometres (8.0 mi)	110
Tsing Long Highway	12.5 kilometres (7.8 mi)	80/100
Tolo Highway	11.3 kilometres (7.0 mi)	100
Fanling Highway	10.0 kilometres (6.2 mi)	80/100
Yuen Long Highway	10.0 kilometres (6.2 mi)	80
Island Eastern Corridor	8.6 kilometres (5.3 mi)	70
San Tin Highway	7.9 kilometres (4.9 mi)	100
Hong Kong–Shenzhen Western Corridor	5.5 kilometres (3.4 mi)	100
Kong Sham Western Highway	5.4 kilometres (3.4 mi)	80
West Kowloon Highway	5.1 kilometres (3.2 mi)	100
Tate's Cairn Highway	4.2 kilometres (2.6 mi)	80
Sha Lek Highway	4.2 kilometres (2.6 mi)	80
Tsuen Wan Road	4.1 kilometres (2.5 mi)	70
Lantau Link	4.0 kilometres (2.5 mi)	80
Tsing Kwai Highway	3.5 kilometres (2.2 mi)	80
Sha Tin Road	3.4 kilometres (2.1 mi)	80
Kwun Tong Bypass	3.0 kilometres (1.9 mi)	70/80
Tai Po Road – Sha Tin Section	1.8 kilometres (1.1 mi)	80
Penny's Bay Highway	1.5 kilometres (0.93 mi)	80
Cheung Tsing Highway	1.2 kilometres (0.75 mi)	80

== Roads, streets, avenues, lanes, paths, highways, crescents and squares ==
=== Hong Kong Island ===
Eastern District

- A Kung Ngam Road
- A Kung Ngam Village Road
- Aldrich Bay Road
- Aldrich Street
- Big Wave Bay Road
- Braemar Hill Road
- Chai Wan Road
- Cheung Man Road
- Ching Wah Street
- Cloud View Road
- Electric Road
- Fort Street
- Fortress Hill Road
- Harbour Parade
- Hong Man Street
- Hong On Street
- Hong Shing Street
- Hong Yue Street
- Java Road
- Ka Yip Street
- Kai Yuen Street
- King's Road
- King Wah Road
- Kornhill Road
- Lok Man Road
- North Point Road
- North View Street
- Oi Lai Street
- Oi Yin Street
- Oil Street
- Shau Kei Wan Road
- Sheung On Street
- Shing Tai Road
- Shun Tai Road
- Stanley Beach Road
- Stanley Gap Road
- Stanley Link Road
- Stanley New Street
- Stanley Main Street
- Stanley Market Street
- Stanley Mound Road
- Stanley Village Road
- Sun Yip Street
- Tai Koo Shing Road
- Tai Koo Wan Road
- Tai Man Road
- Tai Mou Avenue
- Tai Fung Avenue
- Tai Wing Avenue
- Tai Yue Avenue
- Tin Chiu Street
- Tin Hau Temple Road
- Tsat Tsz Mui Road
- Tung Hei Road
- Wharf Road
- Westland Road
- Wing Tai Road

The Mid-Levels

- Albany Road
- Albert Path
- Arbuthnot Road
- Babington Path
- Black's Link
- Conduit Road
- Mount Butler Drive
- Mount Davis Road
- Borrett Road
- Bowen Drive
- Bowen Road
- Breezy Path
- Brewin Path
- Boyce Road
- Briar Avenue
- Caine Road
- Caine Lane
- Chancery Lane
- Castle Road
- Elliot Crescent
- Glenealy
- Hornsey Road
- Lyttleton Road
- MacDonnell Road
- Magazine Gap Road
- Mosque Junction
- Mosque Street
- Ning Yeung Terrace
- Oaklands Road
- Old Peak Road
- Park Road
- Peak Road
- Rednaxela Terrace
- Robinson Road
- Seymour Road
- Seymour Terrace
- Stubbs Road
- Upper Albert Road
- Wong Nai Chung Gap Road

The Peak

- Barker Road
- Bluff Path
- Findlay Road
- Gough Hill Road
- Guildford Road
- Hatton Road
- Harlech Road
- Lugard Road
- Lloyd Path
- May Road
- Mount Austin Road
- Mount Kellett Road
- Pollock's Path

Southern District

- Aberdeen Main Road
- Aberdeen Praya Road
- Aberdeen Reservoir Road
- Ap Lei Chau Bridge Road
- Ap Lei Chau Drive
- Ap Lei Chau Praya Road
- Beach Road
- Bel-air Avenue
- Bel-air Rise
- Bisney Road
- Chi Fu Road
- Cyberport Road
- Deep Water Bay Road
- Heung Yip Road
- Information Crescent
- Island Road
- Nam Fung Road
- Nam Long Shan Road
- Northcote Close
- Ocean Park Road
- Pok Fu Lam Road
- Police School Road
- Repulse Bay Road
- Sandy Bay Road
- Sassoon Road
- Sha Wan Drive
- Shek O Road
- South Bay Road
- Tin Wan Praya Road
- Wah Fu Road
- Wong Chuk Hang Road

Causeway Bay, Central, Happy Valley, Wan Chai, Western District

- Aberdeen Street
- Amoy Street
- Anton Street
- Arsenal Street
- Bank Street
- Battery Path
- Belcher's Street
- Blue Pool Road
- Boat Street
- Bonham Road
- Bonham Strand
- Bonham Strand West
- Bridges Street
- Broadwood Road
- Broom Road
- Brown Street
- Bullock Lane
- Burd Street
- Burrows Street
- Cadogan Street
- Canal Road East
- Canal Road West
- Catchick Street
- Centre Street
- Chater Road
- Cleveland Street
- Cochrane Street
- Connaught Road Central
- Connaught Road West
- Connaught Place
- Cotton Tree Drive
- Cross Street
- D'Aguilar Street
- Davis Street
- Des Voeux Road Central
- Des Voeux Road West
- Drake Street
- Duddell Street
- Eastern Street
- Elgin Street
- Fenwick Street
- First Street
- Fleming Road
- Gage Street
- Garden Road
- Gilman Street
- Gilman's Bazaar
- Glenealy
- Gloucester Road
- Gordon Road
- Great George Street
- Gresson Street
- Gutzlaff Street
- Harbour Road
- Harcourt Road
- Haven Street
- Hennessy Road
- High Street
- Hill Road
- Hillier Street
- Hing Hon Road
- Hollywood Road
- Hospital Road
- Ice House Street
- Jardine's Bazaar
- Johnston Road
- Jubilee Street
- Ka Wai Man Road
- Kennedy Road
- Kennedy Town Praya
- New Praya, Kennedy Town
- King's Road
- Ko Shing Street
- Kotewall Road
- Ladder Street
- Lambeth Walk
- Lan Kwai Fong
- Lee Tung Street
- Leighton Road
- Li Yuen Street East
- Lockhart Road
- Lower Albert Road
- Luard Road
- Lung Wo Road
- Lung Wui Road
- Lyndhurst Terrace
- Mallory Street
- Man Cheung Street
- Man Kwong Street
- Man Po Road
- Man Wa Lane
- Man Yiu Street
- Marsh Road
- McGregor Street
- Monmouth Path
- Morrison Hill Road
- Murray Road
- Oi Kwan Road
- Old Bailey Street
- On Lan Street
- Pak Tsz Lane
- Paterson Street
- Pedder Street
- Peel Street
- Percival Street
- Po Hing Fong
- Pokfield Road
- Possession Street
- Pottinger Street
- Pound Lane
- Queen Victoria Street
- Queen's Road East
- Queen's Road Central
- Queen's Road West
- Queensway
- Rodney Street
- Russell Street
- Saint Joseph Path
- Sands Street
- Second Street
- Sharp Street East
- Sharp Street West
- Shing Tai Road
- Ship Street
- Siu Fai Terrace
- Siu Sai Wan Road
- Smithfield
- Spring Garden Lane
- Stanley Street
- Staunton Street
- Staveley Street
- St. Francis Street
- Stone Nullah Lane
- Sugar Street
- Swatow Street
- Tai Hang Road
- Tai Ping Shan Street
- Tai Tam Road
- Tai Yuen Street
- Thomson Road
- Tim Wa Avenue
- Tim Mei Avenue
- Tin Lok Lane
- Third Street
- Theatre Lane
- Tonnochy Road
- Tung Street
- Victoria Road
- Wan Chai Road
- Water Street
- Wellington Street
- West End Path
- Western Street
- Whitty Street
- Wing Fung Street
- Wing Kut Street
- Wing On Street
- Wing Sing Street
- Wong Nai Chung Road
- Wood Road
- Wun Sha Street
- Wyndham Street
- Yee Wo Street
- Yuen Yuen Street

=== Kowloon and New Kowloon ===
South of Boundary Street

- Argyle Street
- Arran Street
- Ashley Road
- Austin Road
- Austin Road West
- Blenheim Avenue
- Boundary Street
- Bowring Street
- Bristol Avenue
- Bulkeley Street
- Bute Street
- Canton Road
- Cameron Road
- Carnarvon Road
- Chatham Road North
- Chatham Road South
- Chatham Court
- Cheong Tung Road
- Cherry Street
- Chung Hau Street
- Cox's Road
- Dundas Street
- Duke Street
- Dunbar Road
- Earl Street
- Fa Yuen Street
- Fat Kwong Street
- Ferry Street
- Fife Street
- Forfar Road
- Gascoigne Road
- Gateway Boulevard
- Gillies Avenue South
- Gillies Avenue North
- Gullane Road
- Haiphong Road
- Hankow Road
- Hanoi Road
- Hart Avenue
- Hillwood Road
- Humphreys Avenue
- Hung Hom Bypass
- Hung Hom Road
- Ichang Street
- Jordan Road
- Kansu Street
- Kee Lung Street
- Kimberley Street
- Kimberley Road
- Knight Street
- Knutsford Terrace
- Kowloon City Road
- Kowloon Park Drive
- Kwong Wa Street
- Kwun Chung Street
- Lai Chi Kok Road
- Lomond Road
- La Salle Road
- Luen Wan Street
- Ma Tau Chung Road
- Ma Tau Kok Road
- Ma Tau Wai Road
- Maidstone Road
- Market Street
- Middle Road
- Minden Avenue
- Minden Row
- Mody Road
- Mong Kok Road
- Nanking Street
- Nathan Road
- Nelson Street
- Observatory Road
- Peking Road
- Pentland Street
- Pitt Street
- Portland Street
- Prat Avenue
- Prince Edward Road West
- Princess Margaret Road
- Public Square Street
- Reclamation Street
- Sai Yee Street
- Sai Yeung Choi Street North
- Sai Yeung Choi Street South
- Saigon Street
- Salisbury Road
- Scout Path
- Shanghai Street
- Shantung Street
- Short Street
- Soy Street
- Stirling Road
- Temple Street
- Tai Wan Road
- To Kwa Wan Road
- Tung Choi Street
- Tweed Road
- Victory Avenue
- Waterloo Road
- Woosung Street
- Wuhu Street
- Wylie Road
- Yen Chow Street West
- Yim Po Fong Street

North of Boundary Street

- Apliu Street
- Alnwick Road
- Baptist University Road
- Beacon Hill Road
- Boundary Street
- Broadcast Drive
- Broadway
- Castle Peak Road
- Chester Road
- Cheung Sha Wan Road
- Ching Cheung Road
- Choi Wan Road
- Choi Ha Road
- Chun Wah Road
- Clear Water Bay Road
- College Road
- Cornwall Street
- Cumberland Road
- Derby Road
- Dorset Crescent
- Ede Road
- Essex Crescent
- Flint Road
- Fuk Lo Tsun Road
- Fuk Wa Street
- Fung Tak Road
- Fung Shing Street
- Glee Path
- Grampian Road
- Hammer Hill Road
- Hau Wong Road
- Hereford Road
- Hing Wah Street
- Hip Wo Street
- Hiu Kwong Street
- Hong Ning Road
- Ho Tung Road
- Humbert Street
- Inverness Road
- Kai Cheung Road
- Kai Fuk Road
- Kai Tak Road
- Kei Lung Street
- Kent Road
- Lai Chi Kok Road
- Lai Wan Road
- Lancashire Road
- La Salle Road
- Lincoln Road
- Lion Rock Road
- Lok Sin Road
- Lung Cheung Road
- Lung Kong Road
- Mei Lai Road
- Nam Cheong Street
- Nam Kok Road
- Nassau Street
- New Clear Water Bay Road
- Nga Tsin Wai Road
- Nga Tsin Long Road
- Ngau Tau Kok Road
- Oxford Road
- Pei Ho Street
- Pilgrim's Way
- Ping Ting Road
- Po Kong Village Road
- Po Lun Street
- Prince Edward Road East
- Prince Edward Road West
- Renfrew Road
- Rhondda Road
- Rutland Road
- Sa Po Road
- Sau Chuk Yuen Road
- Sham Shing Road
- South Wall Road
- Shek Ku Lung Road
- Ta Ku Ling Road
- Tai Po Road
- Tai Hang Tung Road
- Tai Hang Sai Street
- Tonkin Street
- Wai Yip Street
- Wang Chiu Road
- Wang Kwong Road
- Warwick Road
- Waterloo Road
- Woh Chai Street
- Yen Chow Street
- Ying Wa Street
- York Road
- Yue Man Square
- Yuet Lun Street
- Yu Chau Street

=== New Territories ===
- Castle Peak Road
- Fei Ngo Shan Road
- Lam Kam Road
- Route Twisk
- Sha Tau Kok Road
- Tai Po Road
- Tuen Mun Road

==== Fanling ====
- Fan Leng Lau Road
- Jockey Club Road
- Lok Yip Street
- Ma Sik Road
- Pik Fung Road
- Po Kak Tsai Road
- San Wan Road

==== Kam Tin, Pat Heung and Shek Kong ====
- Kam Ho Road
- Kam Po Road
- Kam Sheung Road
- Kam Shui Road
- Kam Shui North Road
- Kam Shui South Road
- Kam Tin Bypass
- Kam Tin Road
- Kam Wui Road
- Pat Heung Road
- Shek Kong Airfield Road
- Tung Wui Road

==== Kwai Chung ====
- Castle Peak Road - Kwai Chung
- Container Port Road and Container Port Road South
- Hing Fong Road
- Joint Street
- Hing Wah Street West
- King Cho Road
- Kwai Chung Road
- Kwai Fuk Road
- Kwai Shing Circuit
- Kwai Tsing Road
- Lai Chi Ling Road
- Lai Cho Road
- Lai King Hill Road
- Lei Muk Road
- Lim Cho Street
- Princess Margaret Hospital Road
- Shek Pai Street
- Tai Lin Pai Road
- Tai Wo Hau Road
- Texaco Road
- Wo Yi Hop Road

==== Sai Kung ====
- Chan Man Street
- Che Keng Tuk Road
- Chui Tong Road
- Chuk Yeung Road
- Fui Yiu Lane
- Fuk Man Road
- Fung Sau Road
- Hiram's Highway
- Hong Fu Road
- Hong Kin Road
- Hong Nin Path
- Hong Ting Road
- Hong Tsuen Road
- Kak Hang Tun Road
- King Man Street
- Keng Pang Ha Road
- Lung Mei Tsuen Road
- Man Nin Street
- Mei Yu Street
- Mei Yuen Street
- Muk Min Shan Road
- Nam Shan San Tsuen Road
- Nin Chun Street
- Pak Kong Road
- See Cheung Street
- Sha Kok Mei Road
- Tai Mong Tsai Road
- Tso Wo Road
- Wan King Path
- Yan Yee Road
- Yi Chun Street

==== San Tin ====
- Mai Po Road
- Mai Po Lung Road
- San Sham Road
- San Tam Road
- San Tin Tsuen Road
- Shek Wu Wai Road
- Tun Yu Road

==== Sha Tau Kok ====
- Che Ping Street
- Chung Ying Street
- Market Street (Sha Tau Kok)
- San Lau Street
- Sha Ho Road
- Shan Tsui Village Road
- Shun Cheong Street
- Shun Hing Street
- Shun Lung Street
- Shun Ping Street

==== Sha Tin ====
- A Kung Kok Street
- Au Pui Wan Street
- Chap Wai Kon Street
- Che Kung Miu Road
- Fo Tan Road
- Fung Shek Street
- Fung Shun Street
- Ho Lek Pui Street
- Hung Mui Kuk Road
- Jat Min Chuen Street
- Kam Ying Road
- Kong Pui Street
- Lek Yuen Street
- Lok King Street
- Lok Lam Street
- Ma On Shan Road
- Mei Tin Road
- Ngan Shing Street
- Ngau Pei Shan Street
- On Chun Street
- On Yuen Street
- On Luk Street
- Pai Tau Street
- Pak Tak Street
- Pok Chuen Street
- Sai Sha Road
- Siu Lek Yuen Road
- Sha Kok Street
- Sha On Street
- Sha Tin Road
- Sha Tin Centre Street
- Sha Tin Rural Committee Road
- Sha Tin Wai Road
- Sha Tin Tau Road
- Shan Mei Street
- Shui Chuen Au Street
- Sui Wo Road
- Tai Chung Kiu Road
- Tak Kei Street
- Tak Lee Street
- Tak Yi Street
- Tam Kon Po Street
- Tin Sam Street
- To Fung Shan Road
- Tsung Tau Ha Road
- Wang Pok Street
- Wo Che Street
- Wo Heung Street
- Wo Liu Hang Street
- Wo Shing Street
- Wo Shui Street
- Yat Tai Street
- Yuen Chau Kok Road
- Yuen Wo Road

==== Sheung Shui ====
- Fan Kam Road
- Lung Sum Avenue
- Po Shek Wu Road
- Po Wan Road
- San Fung Avenue

==== Tai Po ====
- Choi Tip Street
- Fung Yuen Road
- Kwong Fuk Road
- Ma Wo Road
- Ma Chung Road
- Nam Wan Road
- On Fu Road
- On Po Road
- Plover Cove Road
- Po Heung Road
- Tai Po (Tai Wo) Road
- Tai Po (Yuen Chau Tsai) Road
- Tat Wan Road
- Ting Kok Road
- Wai Yi Street
- Yuen Shin Road

==== Tseung Kwan O ====
- Chi Shin Street
- Chiu Shun Road
- Choi Ming Street
- Chui Ling Road
- Chun Cheong Street
- Chun Choi Street
- Chun Kwong Street
- Chun Sing Street
- Chun Wang Street
- Chun Yat Street
- Chun Ying Street
- Chung Wa Road
- Hang Hau Road
- King Ling Road
- Lohas Park Road
- Man Kuk Lane
- Ming Shing Street
- Ngan O Road
- O King Road
- Pak Shing Kok Road
- Po Hong Road
- Po Lam Lane
- Po Lam North Road
- Po Lam Road
- Po Lam South Road
- Po Ning Road
- Po Shun Road
- Po Yap Road
- Pui Shing Lane
- Pui Shing Road
- Pung Loi Avenue
- Pung Loi Road
- Shek Kok Road
- Sheung Ning Road
- Tong Chun Street
- Tong Ming Street
- Tong Tak Street
- Tong Yin Street
- Tseung Kwan O Road
- Tseung Kwan O Tunnel Road
- Wan O Road
- Wan Po Road
- Wan Poon Path
- Ying Yip Road

==== Tsing Yi ====
- Ching Hong Road
- Chung Mei Road
- Cheung Wan Road
- Fung Shue Wo Road
- Tam Kon Shan Road
- Tsing Hong Road
- Tsing Yi Heung Sze Wui Road
- Tsing Yi Road
- Tsing Yi Road West
- Tsing Yi Main Street
- Tsing Yi North Coastal Road

==== Tsuen Wan ====
- Castle Peak Road - Tsuen Wan
- Chuen Lung Street
- Chung On Street
- Ma Tau Pa Road
- Route Twisk
- Sha Tsui Road
- Shing Mun Road
- Tai Chung Road
- Tai Ho Road and Tai Ho Road North
- Texaco Road and Texaco Road North
- Tsing Tsuen Road
- Tsuen King Circuit
- Tsuen Wan Road
- Yeung Uk Road

==== Tuen Mun ====
- Lung Mun Road
- Ming Kum Road
- Sam Shing Street
- Shek Pai Tau Road
- Tsing Tin Road
- Tsing Wun Road
- Tuen Mun Heung Sze Wui Road
- Wong Chu Road
- Wu King Road
- Wu Shan Road
- Pui To Road

==== Yau Kom Tau ====
- Po Fung Road
- Yau Lai Road

==== Yuen Long ====
- Castle Peak Road
- Fuk Hi Street
- Fung Cheung Road
- Ma Tin Road
- Ma Tong Road
- On Lok Road
- Long Lok Road
- Long Yip Street
- Wang Lee Street
- Wang Lok Street

==== Outlying Islands ====
===== Chek Lap Kok Airport =====
- Airport Road
- Airport Expo Boulevard
- Catering Road West
- Catering Road Central
- Catering Road East
- Chek Lap Kok South Road
- Cheong Hing Road
- Cheong Hong Road
- Cheong King Road
- Cheong Lin Path
- Cheong Lin Road
- Cheong Shun Road
- Cheong Tat Road
- Cheong Wing Road
- Cheong Wong Road
- Cheong Yip Road
- Chung Cheung Road
- East Coast Road
- Kwo Lo Wan Road
- North Perimeter Road
- Runway Road South
- Sky City Road
- Sky Plaza Drive
- Sky Plaza Road
- South Perimeter Road

===== Cheung Chau =====
Note: Cheung Chau is not accessible by vehicle, roads are only used by pedestrians, cyclists and some licensed vehicles.

- Cheung Chau Church Road
- Cheung Chau Peak Road
- Chung Hing Street
- Pak Sha Praya Road
- Pak She Street
- Sun Hing Street
- Tai San Street
- Tung Wan Road

===== Lamma Island =====
- Administration Road
- Chimney Road
- Main Street, Yung Shue Wan
- Precipitor Road
- Reservoir Road
- Sok Kwu Wan First Street
- Sok Kwu Wan Second Street
- Sok Kwu Wan Third Street
- Stacker Road
- Waterfront Road
- Yung Shue Wan Back Street
- Yung Shue Wan Plaza Road

===== Peng Chau =====
- Chi Yan Street
- Fu Peng Street
- Ho King Street
- Kwai Peng Street
- Lo Peng Street
- Lok Peng Street
- Peng Chau Wing Hing Street
- Peng Chau Wing On Street
- Peng Chau Wing On Street
- Po Peng Street

== Bus priority ==
The Transport Department has designated about 22 km (14 mi) of road length as exclusive "bus lanes" out of approximately 2,000 km (1,200 mi) of accessible roads.

== Monitoring major roads ==
Online CCTV cameras provide near real-time road conditions for all major road users, as well as facilitating monitoring of traffic. As of April 2025, 987 closed-circuit cameras have been installed in Hong Kong to provide traffic snapshot images, and real-time road traffic information to the public. Congestion is heaviest in Kowloon, Hung Shui Kiu, Shatin, and along the northern shore of Hong Kong Island.

== See also ==
- Roads in Hong Kong (category)
- Hong Kong Guide – Offering list of streets and roads.
- Suffixes of Hong Kong streets
