= Deep Water Bay Road =

Road in Southern District, Hong Kong

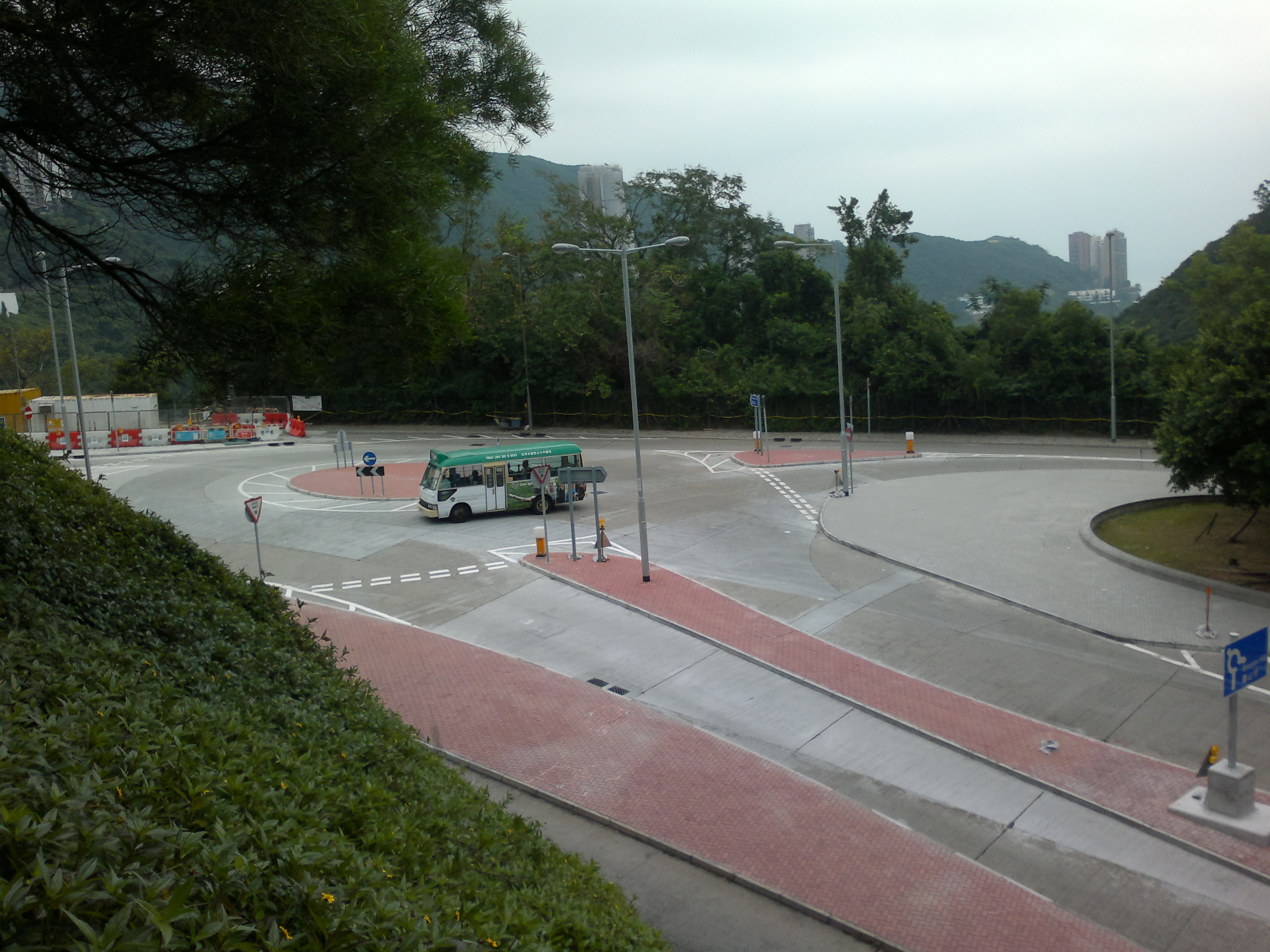
- Nam Fung Road near Deep Water Bay Road
- Interactive map of Deep Water Bay Road
- Native name: 深水灣道 (Yue Chinese)
- Namesake: Deep Water Bay
- Length: 2.7 km (1.7 mi)
- Location: Hong Kong
- Coordinates: 22.253582°N 114.186335°E
- Northeast end: Wong Nai Chung Gap Road and Repulse Bay Road near Wong Nai Chung Reservoir
- Southwest end: Island Road near Hong Kong Golf Club

Construction
- Inauguration: 24 September 1937; 88 years ago

Deep Water Bay Road
- Traditional Chinese: 深水灣道
Transcriptions
Standard Mandarin
- Hanyu Pinyin: Shēnshuǐwān dào
Yue: Cantonese
- Jyutping: sham1 shui2 waan1 dou6

Deep Water Bay Road (Chinese: 深水灣道) is a road in the Southern District in Hong Kong. It constitutes part of the road south from Happy Valley towards Wong Chuk Hang. It is renowned as one of the wealthiest streets in Hong Kong and the world, with over a dozen billionaires living in mansions on this road.

== Mansions ==
Many billionaires and famous people reside on this road, including Li Ka-Shing, Joseph Lau Luen-hung, the Kwok brothers and the Kadoorie family.

== Other structures ==
- Hong Kong Golf Club
- Deep Water Bay Beach
- Wong Nai Chung Reservoir

== Intersecting roads ==
Roads are listed north to south.

- Wong Nai Chung Gap Road and Repulse Bay Road
- Nam Fung Road
- Deep Water Bay Drive
- Shouson Hill Road East
- Island Road

== See also ==
- Deep Water Bay
- List of streets and roads in Hong Kong
