= 2008 June Hong Kong rainstorm =

Weather event in Hong Kong

The June 2008 Hong Kong Rainstorm was a rainstorm in Hong Kong on 7 June 2008 that caused flooding and landslides. It resulted in 2 deaths and 16 injuries. The Hong Kong Observatory recorded 145.5mm of precipitation at its headquarters between 08:00 to 09:00, setting the 2nd highest one-hour precipitation record. A total of 307.1mm of precipitation was recorded during that day.

The volcanic cloud arising from the eruption of the Chaiten volcano in Chile on May 2, 2008, at about 08:00 coordinated universal time was found by an analysis of Moderate Resolution Imaging Spectroradiometer Data (MODIS) to have impacted Hong Kong on June 6, 2008, after 35 days which is agreement with the e-folding time of sulphur dioxide.

== Precipitation ==
An active trough had been affecting the South China coast since May 29, 2008. Around dawn on June 7, rainfall arrived in Hong Kong. The rainfall focused on Lantau Island, Kowloon and Hong Kong Island.Precipitation peaked between 08:00 and 09:00 with the Hong Kong Observatory headquarters recording 145.5mm of precipitation, an all-time high. At Tung Chung, the total precipitation for the day surpassed 400mm and the Former Chief Executive, Donald Tsang, described it as a "once in a century" event. The Civil Engineering and Development Department of Hong Kong estimated it as a "once in 1100 years" occurrence.

== Rainstorm Signals ==
An Amber rainstorm signal was issued at 05:15, and it escalated to Red at 05:55. 112mm, 101mm, and 86mm of rain were recorded at the Eastern, Southern, and Sai Kung Districts respectively. The Hong Kong Observatory eventually issued a Black rainstorm signal at 06:40 and it was sustained for 4 hours and 20 minutes. Red replaced Black at 11:00 and was then replaced by Amber at 11:30. All signals were cancelled at 13:30. A Landslide Warning was maintained from 01:00 June 7th till 12:00 June 8th.

== New Territories ==
A retaining wall at Old Coffee Bay, Castle Peak Road, Tuen Mun fell and collapsed on a store, killing two shoppers who were cousins on a visit from mainland China. Despite the best efforts of firefighters and nearby residents, their bodies were not unearthed until 18:30. The North Lantau Highway experienced severe flooding. Major landslip occurred in Tung Chung, blocking all lanes of the highway. Ground commute between Tung Chung, airport and downtown was completely halted, except for train service.

== Kowloon ==
A section of Hung Hom Road collapsed at 13:00 on June 8 due to the previous day's heavy rainfall, causing detours.

== Hong Kong Island ==
A 1.5m flood was observed at Sheung Wan, as well as seawater back-flow. Village houses in Pokfulam were flooded, as were many roads, including Tai Hang Road, Pokfulam Road, Water Street and Hill Road, Wong Nai Chung Road, Tin Lok Lane and Wong Chuk Hang Road. A landslide was seen at Kennedy Town with 13 slopes pronounced high risk after the rainstorm.

== Effects ==
- 326 landslips and 539 floods were reported
- 410 flights were delayed, 14 were canceled on June 7
- Hong Kong Wetland Park and Disneyland Resort were temporarily closed in the morning
- Ngong Ping 360 service was halted
- All banks and judiciary organizations closed for the day
- The central allocation of primary school was delayed
- Many hiking trails were closed, detoured or permanently blocked, especially on Lantau Island
