= Black's Link, Hong Kong =

Road in Hong Kong

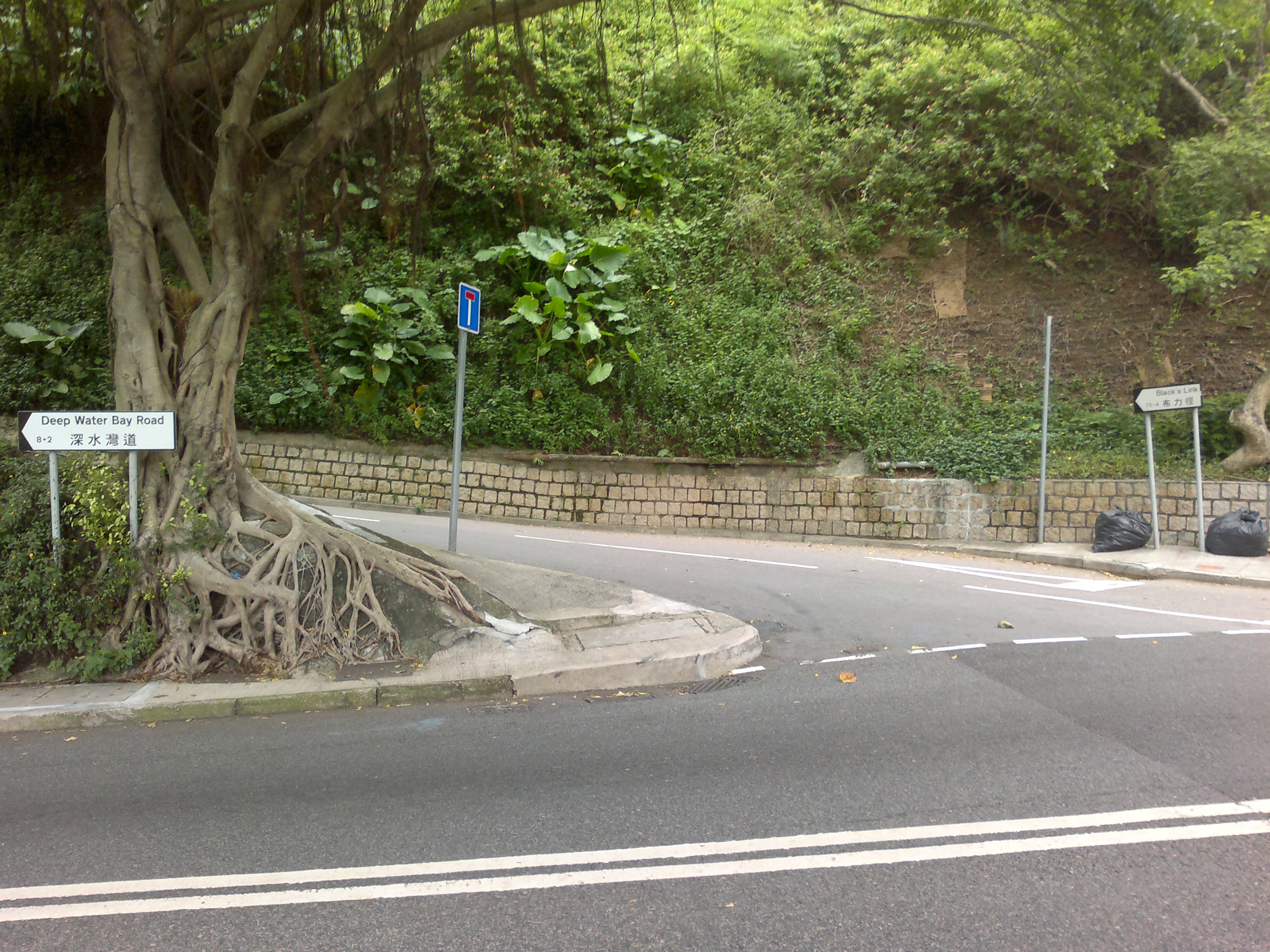
Black's Link

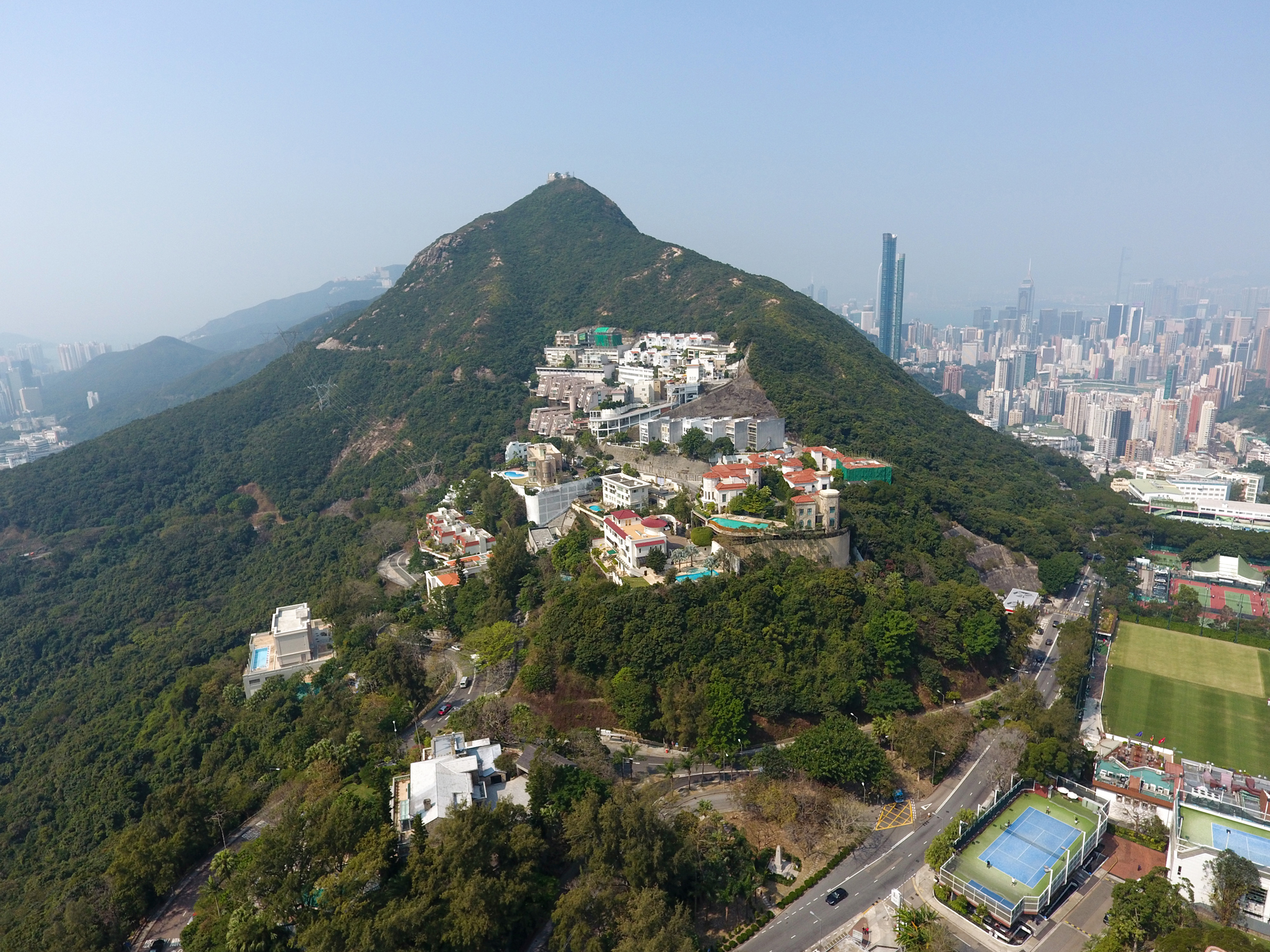
Black's Link near Deep Water Bay Road

Black's Link (Chinese: 布力徑) is a road in Hong Kong, located on the hillside south of Mount Nicholson on Hong Kong Island, connecting Wan Chai Gap and Wong Nai Chung Gap. Part of the road is a luxury residential area, while part of the road is part of Section 4 of the Hong Kong Trail. It was named after Major-General Sir Wilsone Black, the commander-in-chief of the British Army in Hong Kong in the late 19th century and former Acting Governor of Hong Kong.

There are residential areas at the eastern end of Black's Link, which is accessible by vehicles. But the after the residential area is Aberdeen Country Park. According to the Country Parks and Special Areas Regulations (郊野公園及特別地區規例), vehicles and bicycles are prohibited from entering the roads within country parks. There are signs at both ends of the Black's Link warning motorists and cyclists not to enter the country park. Therefore, cars or bicycles cannot travel between Wan Chai Gap and Wong Nai Chung Gap via the Black's Link.

It is worth noting that financial news, real estate developers and real estate agents often promote Black's Link as the Peak District. According to outline zoning plan, Stubbs Road and many streets on Mid-levels are also considered to be The Peak. Geographically, Black's Link is closest to Deep Water Bay. This led to Victoria Peak or The Peak being Hong Kong's most expensive area, which in fact, is no longer one of the top three most expensive after 2020.

== History ==
When Black was the Acting Governor of Hong Kong in 1898, he proposed to build a road connecting Wan Chai Gap, Central Gap and Wong Nai Chung Gap to enhance the army's mobility and combat capabilities between the gorges, as the lack of a horizontal road between Victoria Gap (爐峰峽), Wan Chai Gap and Wong Nai Chung Gap weakened the defense capability of the south bank. The road was originally named "General Black's Link", but in his farewell speech, Black suggested that it be shortened to "The Black Link". This section of the trail was originally built by the military, but was handed over to the government after its completion in 1904 and was eventually named "Black's Link".

Because Black's Link is close to Wong Nai Chung Gap, a major battlefield in the Battle of Hong Kong, artillery shells left over from the war have been discovered many times.
