= Repulse Bay Road =

Road in Hong Kong

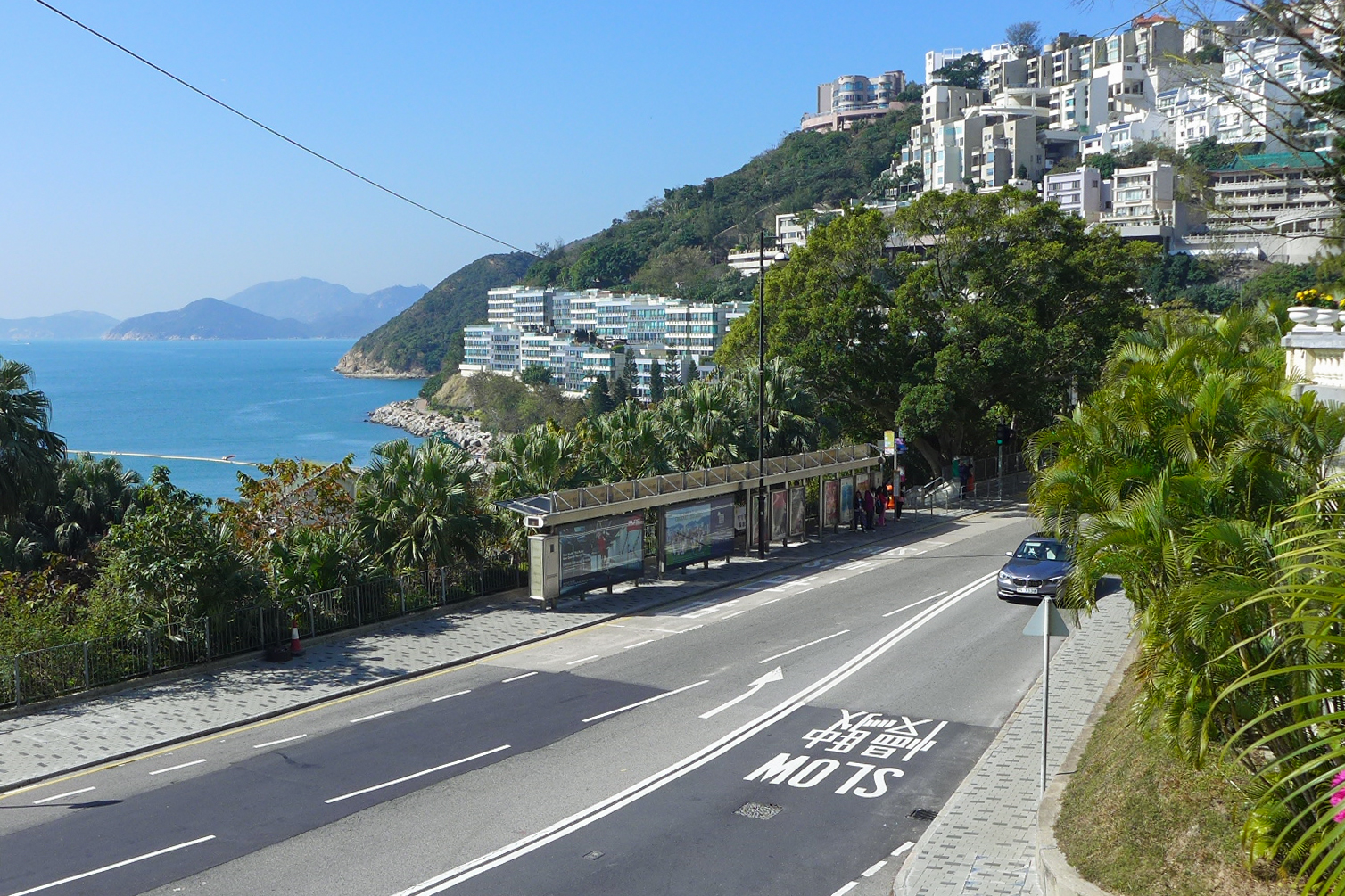
- Repulse Bay Road
- Interactive map of Repulse Bay Road
- Native name: 淺水灣道 (Yue Chinese)
- Namesake: Repulse Bay
- Length: 5.3 km (3.3 mi)
- Location: Hong Kong
- Coordinates: 22.23843°N 114.19584°E
- North end: Wong Nai Chung Gap Road and Deep Water Bay Road near Wong Nai Chung Reservoir
- South end: Chung Hom Kok Road and Stanley Gap Road

Construction
- Inauguration: Section south of Island Road: Before Colonial Era; Section north of Island Road: 1924; 102 years ago

Repulse Bay Road
- Traditional Chinese: 淺水灣道
Transcriptions
Standard Mandarin
- Hanyu Pinyin: Qiǎnshuǐwān dào
Yue: Cantonese
- Jyutping: cin2 shui2 waan1 dou6

Repulse Bay Road (Chinese: 淺水灣道) is a road linking Wong Nai Chung Gap as it comes up from Happy Valley to Deep Water Bay then on to Repulse Bay and finally Stanley in Hong Kong. It is one of the richest and most exclusive roads in Hong Kong, with its geography and its views, and has regularly been cited as the most expensive road to rent a house on. It also regularly sets records for its high-value mansions.

The most expensive luxury addresses addresses are those facing Deep Water Bay, before the Island Road roundabout (numbers 1 through 67, and numbers 2 through 44). These include low rise townhomes, such as at 36 Repulse Bay Road, detached larger homes, such as at 20 Repulse Bay Road, and luxury apartments with duplex or triplex layout, such as at 63 Repulse Bay Road. These addresses overlook Deep Water Bay, the South China Sea, and the slopes of the Peak, Hong Kong Golf Club and Deep Water Bay beach. They are known for being the preferred destination for Hong Kong's old-moneyed elite, and also benefit from having the most convenient access and least traffic, and are part of what Forbes has referred to as "the wealthiest neighborhood on earth".

The section "after the roundabout" at the junction of Island Road overlooks Repulse Bay, and "after the second roundabout" onto Middle and South Bay. This includes the section where the Repulse Bay Hotel is located and often jammed with traffic at the weekends. These are more popular with foreign and mainland Chinese expatriates, as well as visiting beachgoers.

== History ==
The section south of Island Road was part of the bigger and former Island Road, which was separated and split into eight parts, between Stanley Gap Road and Island Road. It has existed before the Colonial Era.

The section north of Island Road was built to facilitate connections between Wong Nai Chung Gap and Repulse Bay. Construction work started in 1922, and was completed in 1924.

The building at Repulse Bay No.1 was the site of the fierce battle of Wong Nai Chung Gap, a pivotal battle for the fate of Hong Kong during World War II.

== Road situation ==
As it is the only way to arrive at Repulse Bay Beach and Stanley, two very popular tourist destinations during the holidays, there is usually a lot of traffic on this road, particularly "after the roundabout" (exiting exclusive Deep Water Bay and entering into Repulse Bay) and "after the second roundabout (exiting Repulse Bay toward Middle and South Bay). It is a two-lane road.

== Buildings and mansions ==
Many wealthy people own mansions on this road, including Cheng Yu Tung, Li Ka-Shing, Stanley Ho, Robert Kuok, Canning Fok, Jacky Chan, Kwok Siu-Ming (chairman of Sa Sa) and Charlie Lee (chairman of Lee Kam Kee), Thomas Kwok, Raymond Kwok, Jim Thompson, Michael Kadoorie, Lawrence Ho, and others.

The Repulse Bay Hotel is on this road. The training headquarters of the Hong Kong Lifesaving Society is on this road.

== See also ==
- Repulse Bay
- Repulse Bay Beach
- The Repulse Bay
- List of streets and roads in Hong Kong
- Beaches in Hong Kong
- Deep Water Bay Road
- Wong Nai Chung Gap
