= Stubbs Road =

Road in Hong Kong

Coordinates: 22.2695°N 114.1774°E

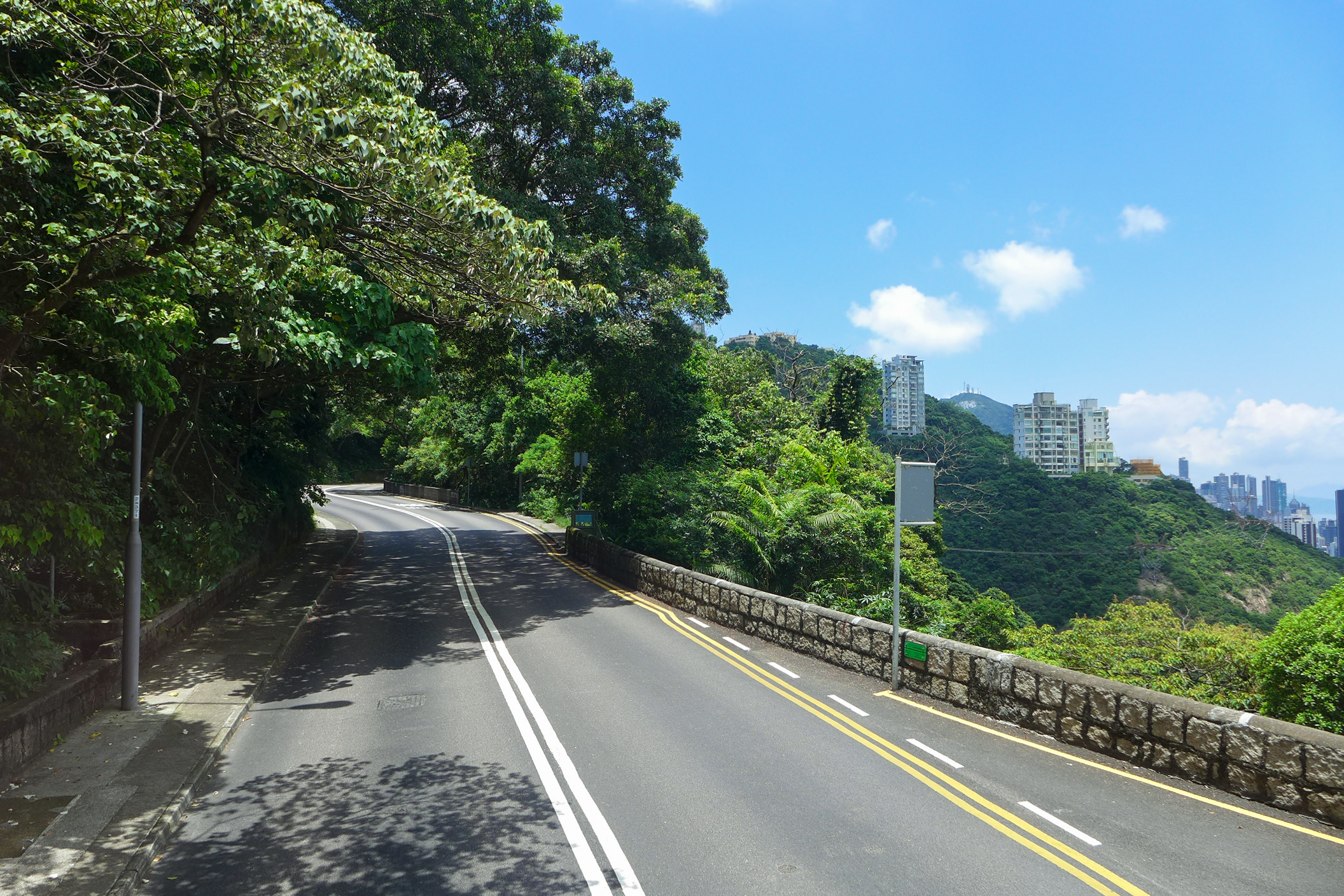
- Stubbs Road, looking due west from the Stubbs Road Lookout

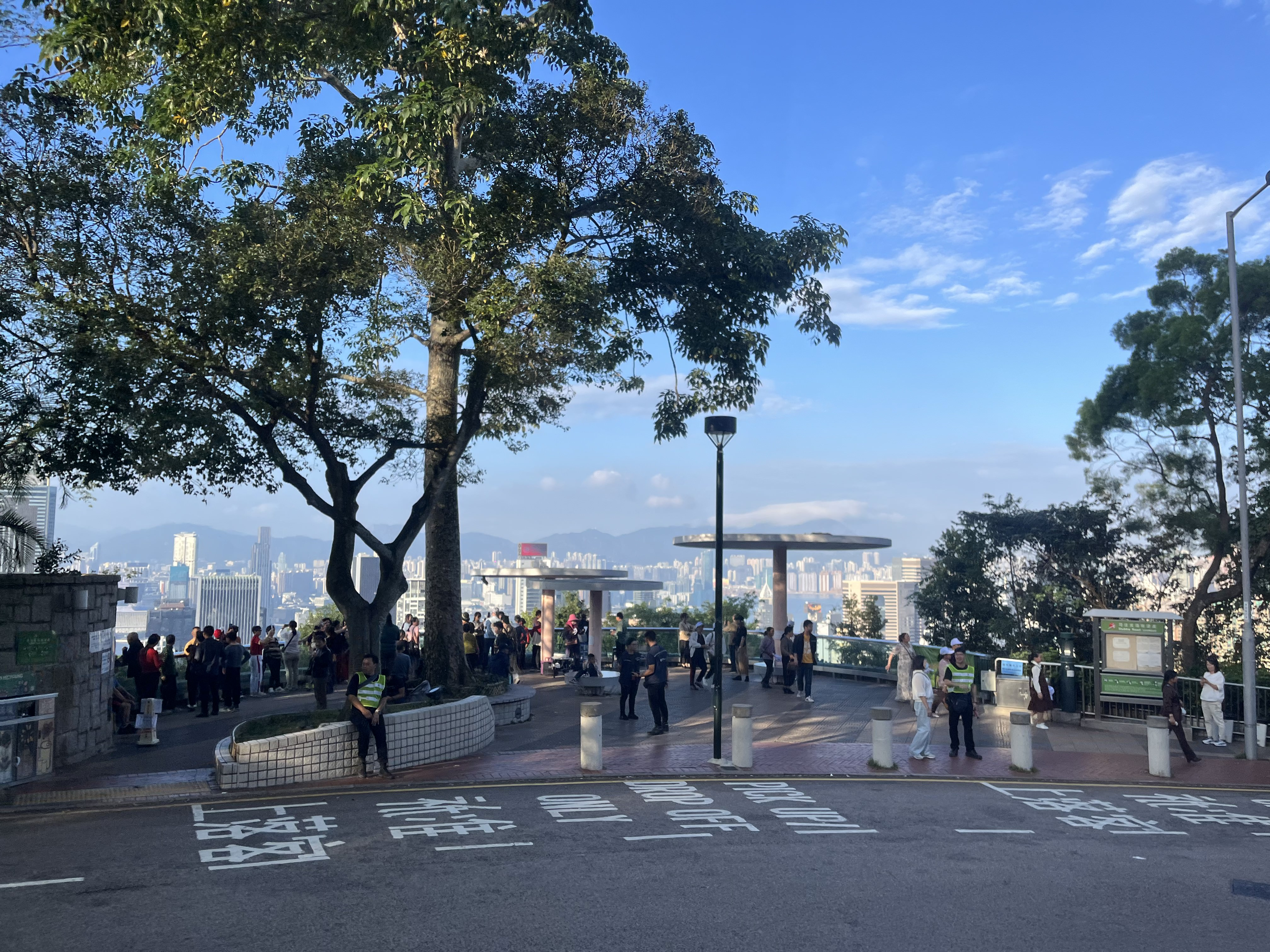
- Stubbs Road Lookout
- Chinese: 司徒拔道
Transcriptions
Standard Mandarin
- Hanyu Pinyin: Sītúbá Dào

Stubbs Road (Chinese: 司徒拔道; Jyutping: si1 tou4 bat6 dou6) is a road located in Mid-Levels East, Hong Kong, which connects Happy Valley to The Peak area on Hong Kong Island, via the Wong Nai Chung Gap. The road is named after the 16th Governor of Hong Kong, Sir Reginald Edward Stubbs.

The road is formed of two sections: upper and lower. The lower section begins at the junction with Queen's Road East where the Khalsa Diwan Sikh Temple is located, and winds its way upwards before terminating at the roundabout with Tai Hang Road and Wong Nai Chung Gap Road. The roundabout provides access to the second (upper) section of Stubbs Road, where the Stubbs Road Lookout – offering spectacular views of Tsim Sha Tsui – is located. Stubbs Road continues snaking its way uphill before merging with Peak Road at the junction with Coombe Road.

== Features ==
The following notable buildings are located along the length of both sections of Stubbs Road, and are listed in order of appearance:

- Khalsa Diwan Sikh Temple
- Hong Kong Adventist Hospital
- Rosaryhill School
- Highcliff
- King Yin Lei
- Opus Hong Kong

== See also ==
- List of streets and roads in Hong Kong
- Stone wall trees in Hong Kong
