= Wong Nai Chung Gap Road =

Road in Hong Kong

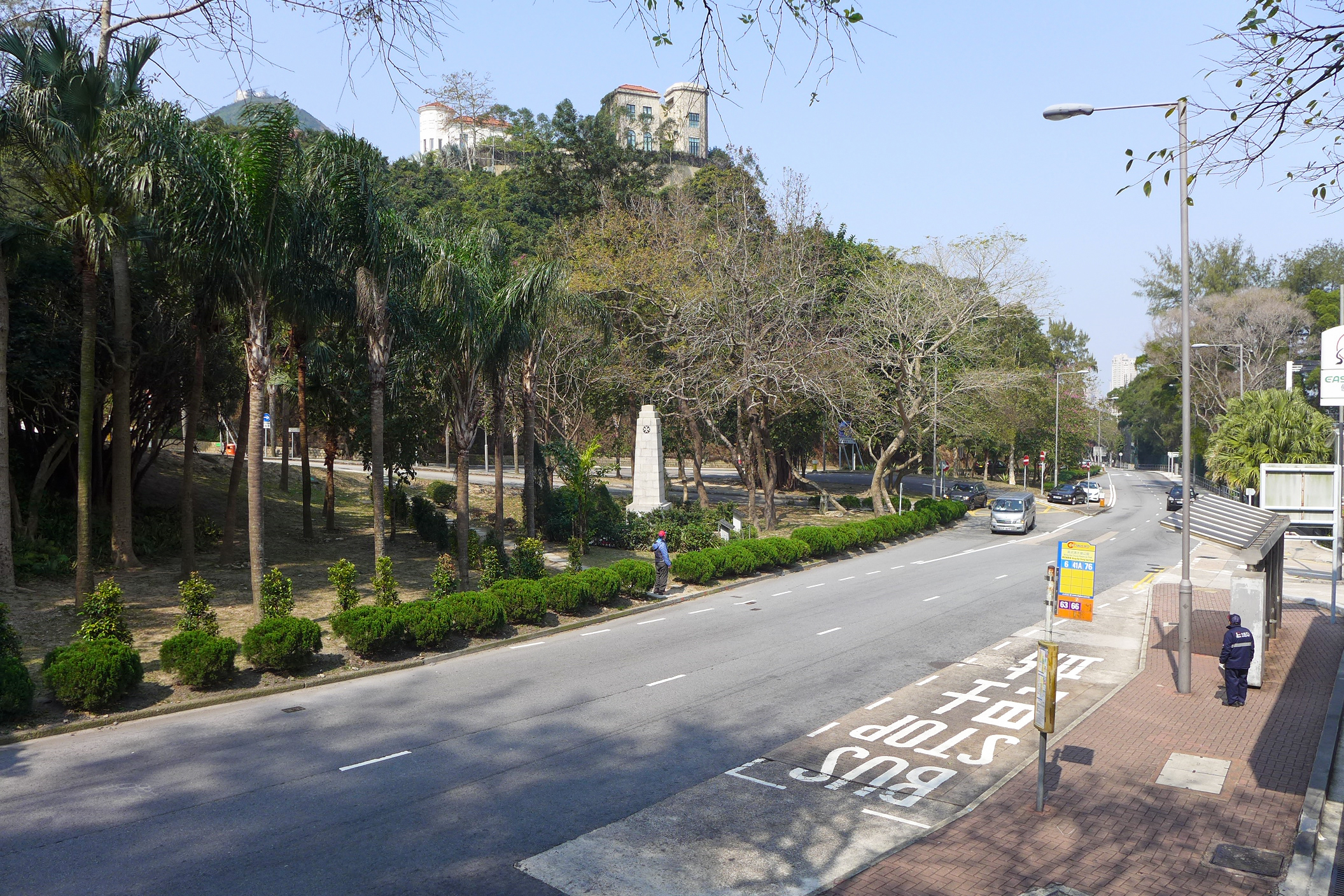
- Near the south end of Wong Nai Chung Gap Road opposite the St. John War Memorial
- Interactive map of Wong Nai Chung Gap Road
- Native name: 黃泥涌峽道 (Yue Chinese)
- Namesake: Wong Nai Chung Gap
- Length: 1.2 km (0.75 mi)
- Location: Hong Kong
- Coordinates: 22.261054°N 114.190731°E
- Southeast end: Deep Water Bay Road and Repulse Bay Road near Wong Nai Chung Reservoir
- Northwest end: Tai Hang Road and Stubbs Road

Construction
- Inauguration: 7 October 1932

Wong Nai Chung Gap Road
- Traditional Chinese: 黃泥涌峽道
Transcriptions
Standard Mandarin
- Hanyu Pinyin: Huángníchōngxiá dào
Yue: Cantonese
- Jyutping: Wong4 nai4 chung1 hap6 dou6

Wong Nai Chung Gap Road (Chinese: 黃泥涌峽道) is a road in Wan Chai District and Southern District, located within Wong Nai Chung Gap within Hong Kong.

== History ==
The road was built at the strategic pass on Hong Kong Island, named Wong Nai Chung Gap. It was a key road leading from Victoria Harbour towards Stanley and Wong Chuk Hang through this Gap before continuing along Repulse Bay Road down towards the south. It was the site of a major engagement during the Battle of Hong Kong during World War II.

The usage of the road decreased following the opening of the Aberdeen Tunnel, but is now a popular starting point for hikers hiking on the Wong Nai Chung Trail, Wilson Trail or towards Tai Tam.

== Structures ==
- The French International School of Hong Kong
- Hong Kong Cricket Club
- St. John War Memorial
- Wong Nai Chung Reservoir

== Intersecting roads ==
Roads are listed north to south.

- Tai Hang Road and Stubbs Road
- Deep Water Bay Road, Repulse Bay Road and Tai Tam Reservoir Road

== See also ==
- Wong Nai Chung Gap
- Battle of Hong Kong
- List of streets and roads in Hong Kong
