= Island Road =

Road in Hong Kong

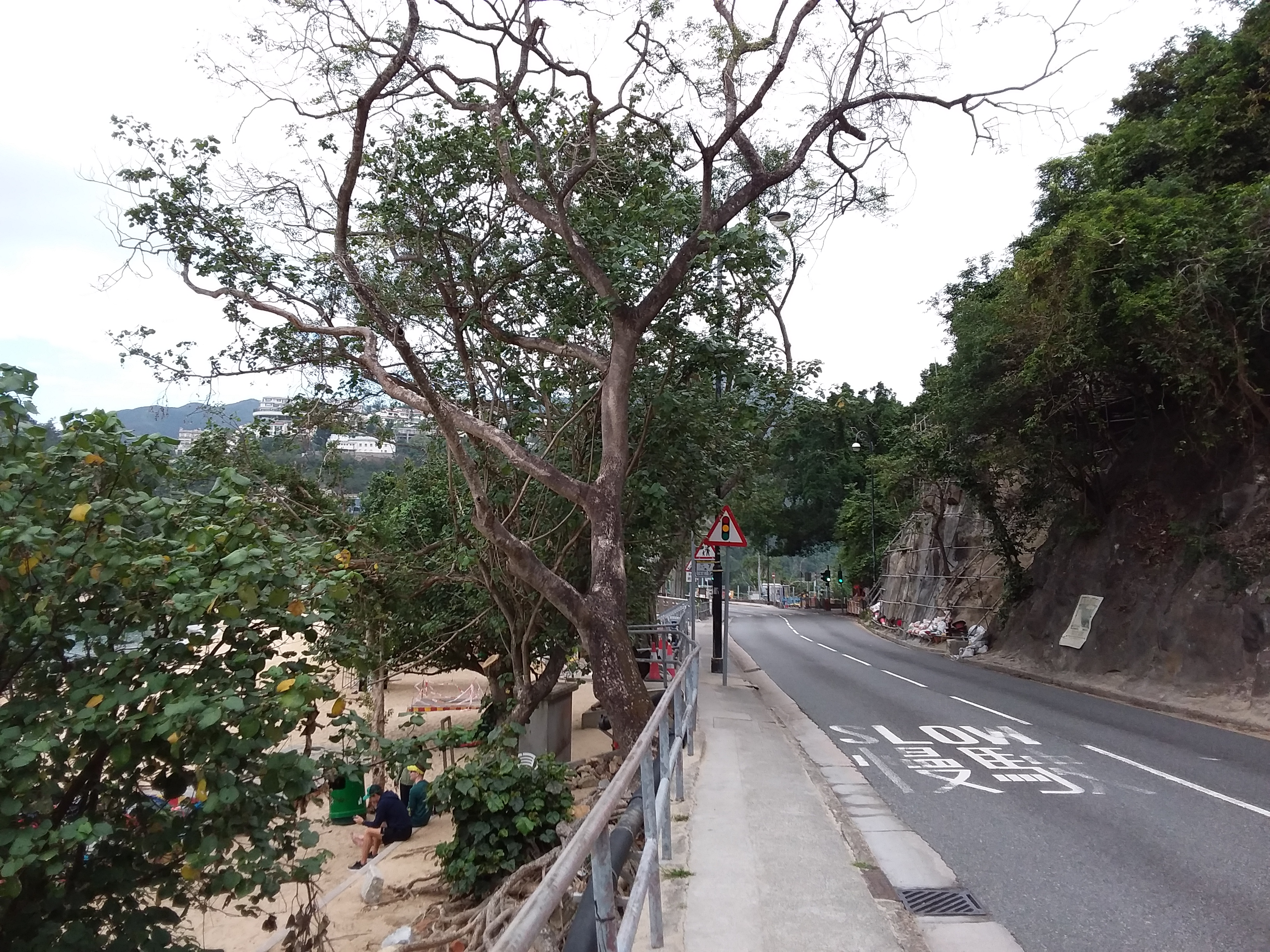
- Island Road near Deep Water Bay Beach
- Interactive map of Island Road
- Native name: 香島道 (Yue Chinese)
- Namesake: Ancient name of trail dating from 1840s
- Length: 2 km (1.2 mi)
- Location: Hong Kong
- Coordinates: 22.245167°N 114.187237°E
- West end: Wong Chuk Hang Road and Shouson Hill Road
- East end: Repulse Bay Road

Construction
- Inauguration: Existed before Colonial era (before 1840)

Island Road
- Traditional Chinese: 香島道
Transcriptions
Standard Mandarin
- Hanyu Pinyin: Xiāngdǎo dào
Yue: Cantonese
- Jyutping: heung1 dou2 dou6

Island Road (Chinese: 香島道) is a road in the Southern District of Hong Kong, facing Deep Water Bay and the South China Sea. It links Wong Chuk Hang with Repulse Bay and Stanley. It is regarded as one of the wealthier roads in Hong Kong.

== History ==
Island Road has existed before the Colonial era, existing before the year 1840 as a major trail towards the south of the island, extending from Shau Kei Wan to Stanley to Aberdeen. The British government later standardized this road during the 1840s.

The road later caused problems for mailing due to its great length, and in 1961 was split into eight sections which still exist today. These are:
1. Chai Wan Road
2. Tai Tam Road
3. Stanley Gap Road
4. Repulse Bay Road
5. Island Road, originally "Island Road, Deep Water Bay" but was abbreviated to Island Road
6. Wong Chuk Hang Road
7. Aberdeen Main Road
8. Shek Pai Wan Road

== Mansions ==
This road is part of the Deep Water Bay area, where many of the wealthy and famous take up their residences in. They include the ex-Chief Executive Tung Chee-hwa, the Kwok brothers, and the Consul-General of Australia.

== Intersecting streets ==
Roads are listed from West to East.

- Wong Chuk Hang Road and Shouson Hill Road
- Deep Water Bay Road
- Repulse Bay Road

== See also ==
- Deep Water Bay
- List of streets and roads in Hong Kong
