= Bank Street, Hong Kong =

Street in Central, Hong Kong

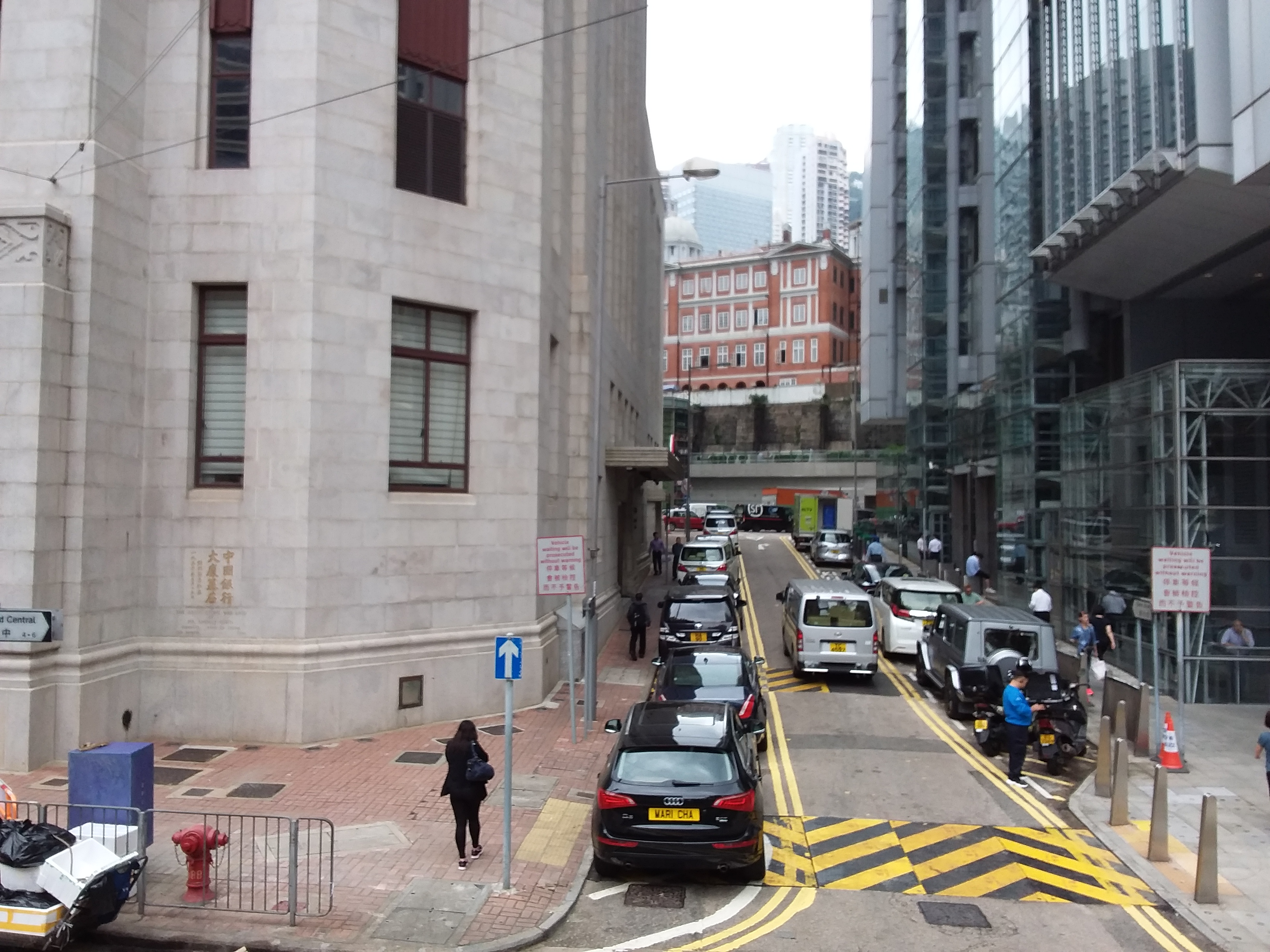
Bank Street, with Bank of China Building on the left, HSBC Building on the right and Former French Mission Building in front

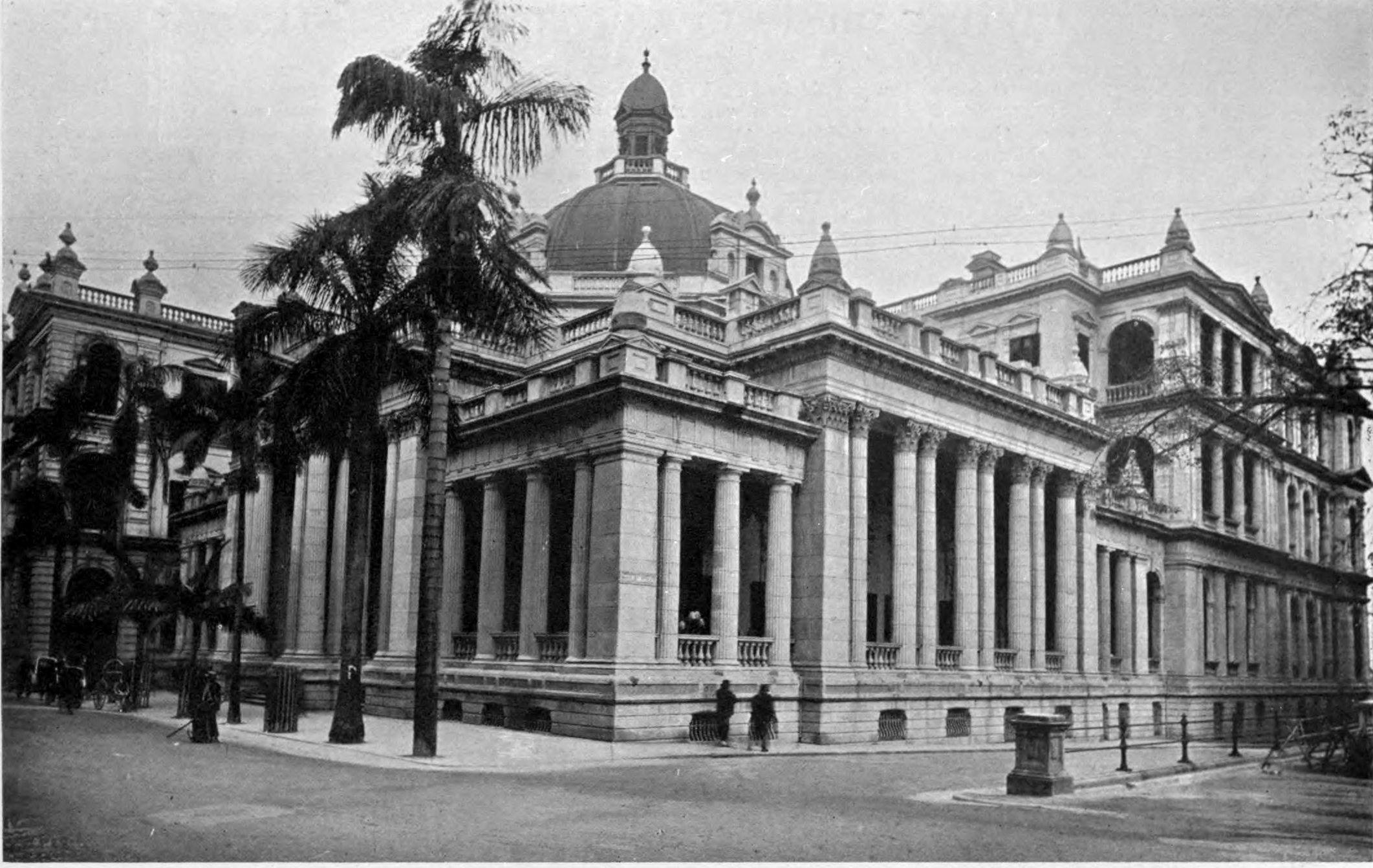
HSBC Building (second generation) at the corner of Queen's Road Central and Wardley Street, c. 1908.

Bank Street (Chinese: 銀行街) is a short street in Central, Hong Kong. It links Des Voeux Road Central to Queen's Road Central. It is named after its location between HSBC Building and the Bank of China Building, the headquarters of HSBC in Hong Kong and the Asia-Pacific and the former headquarters of the Bank of China Group in Hong Kong respectively.

== History ==
The street was constructed shortly after the demolition of and in replacement of the nearby Wardley Street.

== See also ==
- List of streets and roads in Hong Kong
