= Tai Hang Road =

Street in Hong Kong

Coordinates: 22.26956°N 114.19108°E

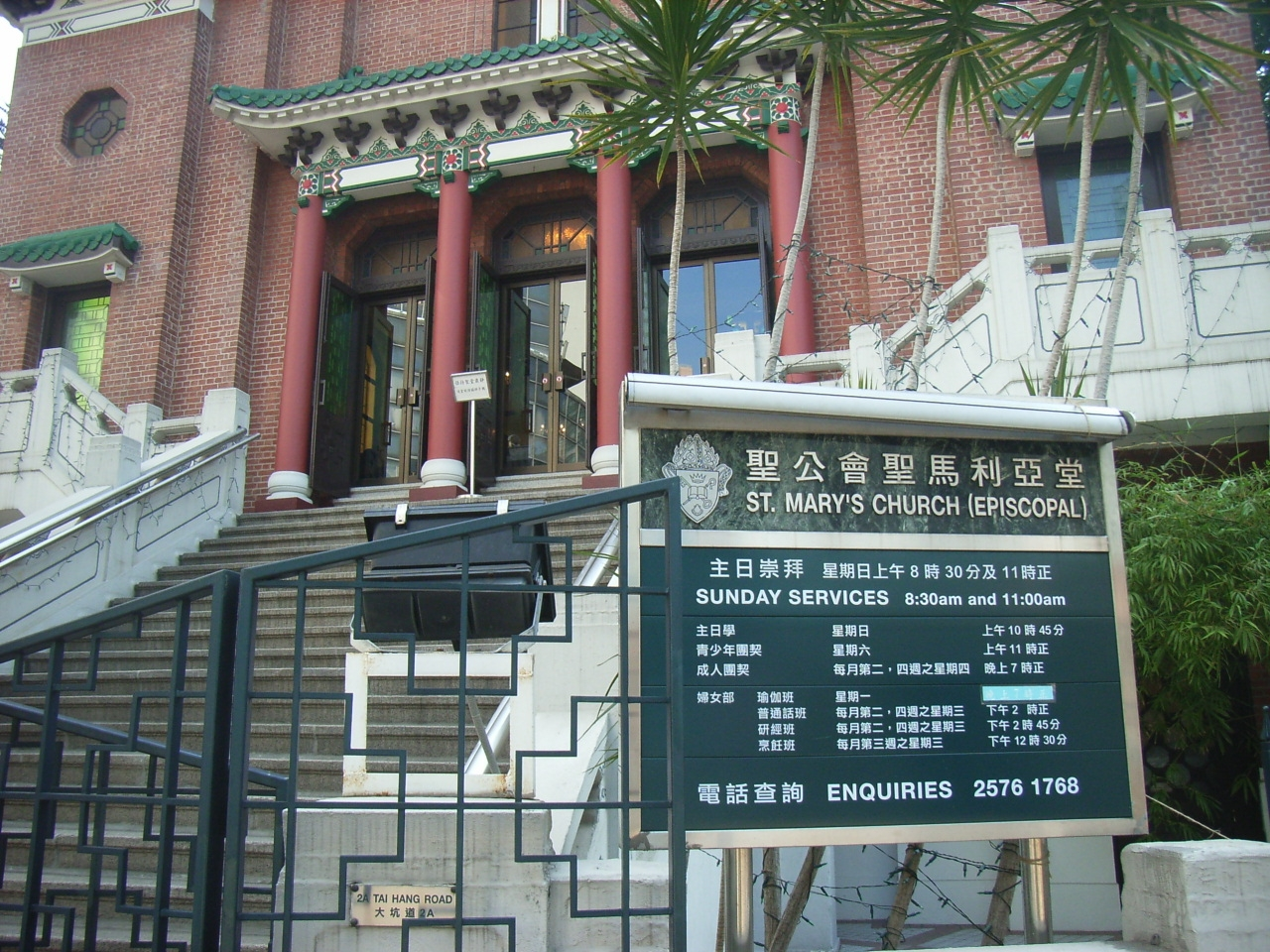
- Entrance of St. Mary's Church, at 2A Tai Hang Road, Causeway Bay, HK in October 2006
- Interactive map of Tai Hang Road
- Native name: 大坑道 (Yue Chinese)
- Length: 3.7 kilometres (2.3 mi)
- Location: Hong Kong Island, Hong Kong
- South end: Wong Nai Chung Gap Road
- North end: Tung Lo Wan Road

Tai Hang Road (Chinese: 大坑道) is a major road on the north side of Hong Kong Island in Hong Kong. Starting low from Tai Hang at Tung Lo Wan Road, Causeway Bay, it winds up to So Kon Po and further up to the mid-levels of Jardine's Lookout and Mount Nicholson, passing through Wong Nai Chung Gap. There are a number of luxurious residential apartments along this road such as Illumination Terrace, Grand Deco Tower and The Legend.

The road meets Lai Tak Tsuen and Haw Par Mansion in Tai Hang.

== See also ==
- List of streets and roads in Hong Kong
