= Wan King Path =

Road in Hong Kong

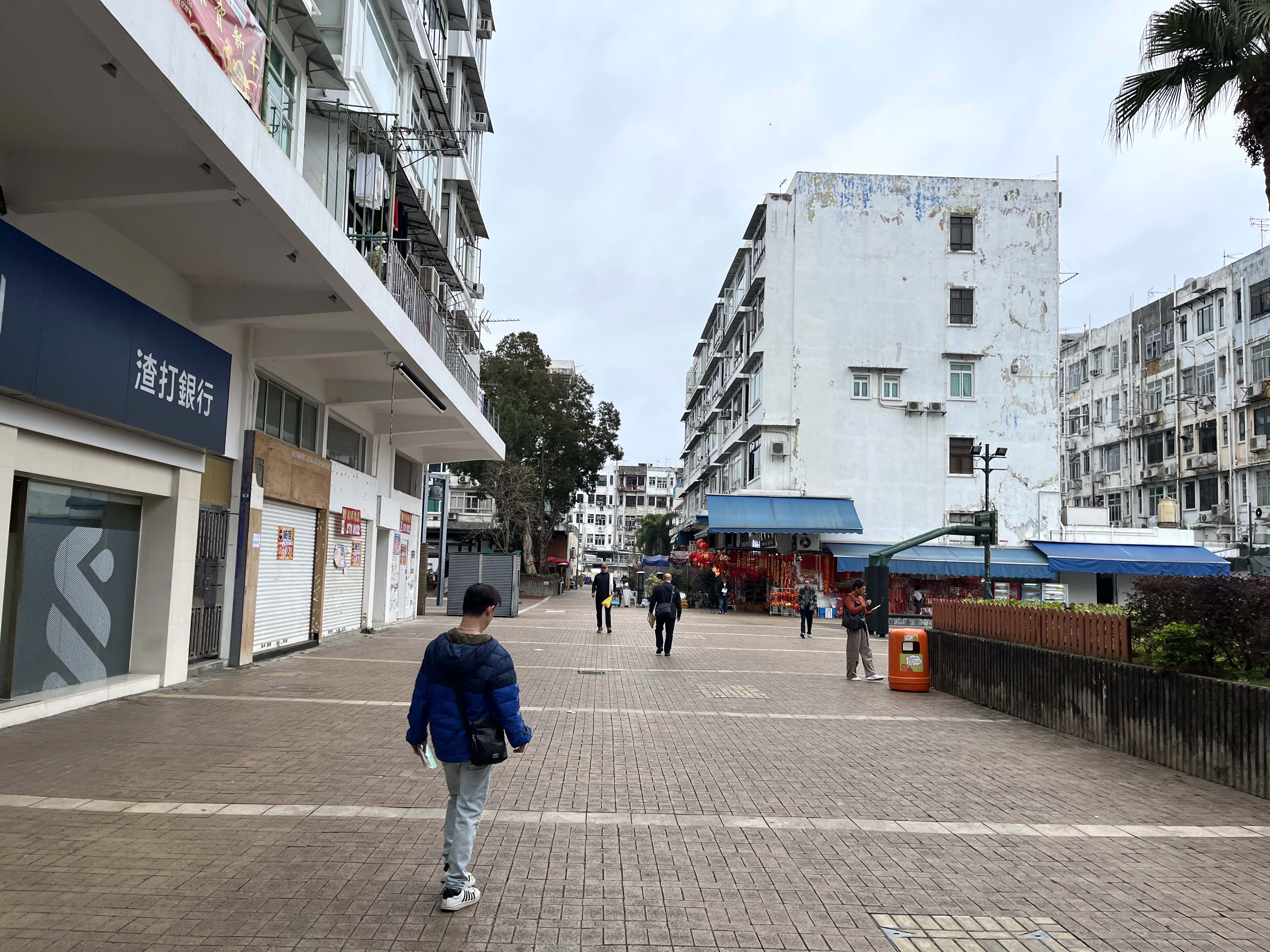
- Wan King Path in 2026
- Interactive map of Wan King Path
- Native name: 灣景街 (Chinese)
- Namesake: lit. 'Bayview Path'
- Type: Pedestrian street
- Location: Sai Kung Town, New Territories, Hong Kong
- Coordinates: 22.381097°N 114.271798°E

Other
- Known for: Unusually named street

Wan King Path (Chinese: 灣景街; lit. 'Bayview Path') is a road in Sai Kung Town, New Territories, Hong Kong. It is located next to the main public square in Sai Kung Town.

== Name ==
The English name of Wan King Path is the phonetic spelling of Chinese words for "bay view", probably a reference to the fact that one can view the nearby bay, the Inner Port Shelter, not too far from this street. Outside of Hong Kong and China, Wan King Path has gained international media attention due to the name appearing similar to an English-language vulgar slang word for masturbation, wanking. In 2006, it was included in the Rude World: The 100 Rudest Place Names in the World book.

The name of the path may have come about when members of the Royal Navy asked members of the local population the local name of locations to make a translation for signs. The residents reportedly would often reply by using names that were intentionally offensive Chinese names or by using puns and incorrect translations. The British government in Hong Kong used these names for places in Hong Kong up until the 1990s when the Geographical Place Names Board was established to correct the erroneous translations. The name of Wan King Path was not changed during this time. After the transfer of sovereignty over Hong Kong in 1997, there were concerns that the Special Administrative Region government would change names such as Wan King Path for being viewed as colonial, however Wan King Path's name was not changed.

== Buildings ==
Wan King Path has some banks belonging to the Hong Kong Bank of China and Standard Chartered Hong Kong located along it. Wan King Path also has a number of cafes and restaurants located along it.
