= Mount Nicholson =

Mountain in Hong Kong

- 聶高信山
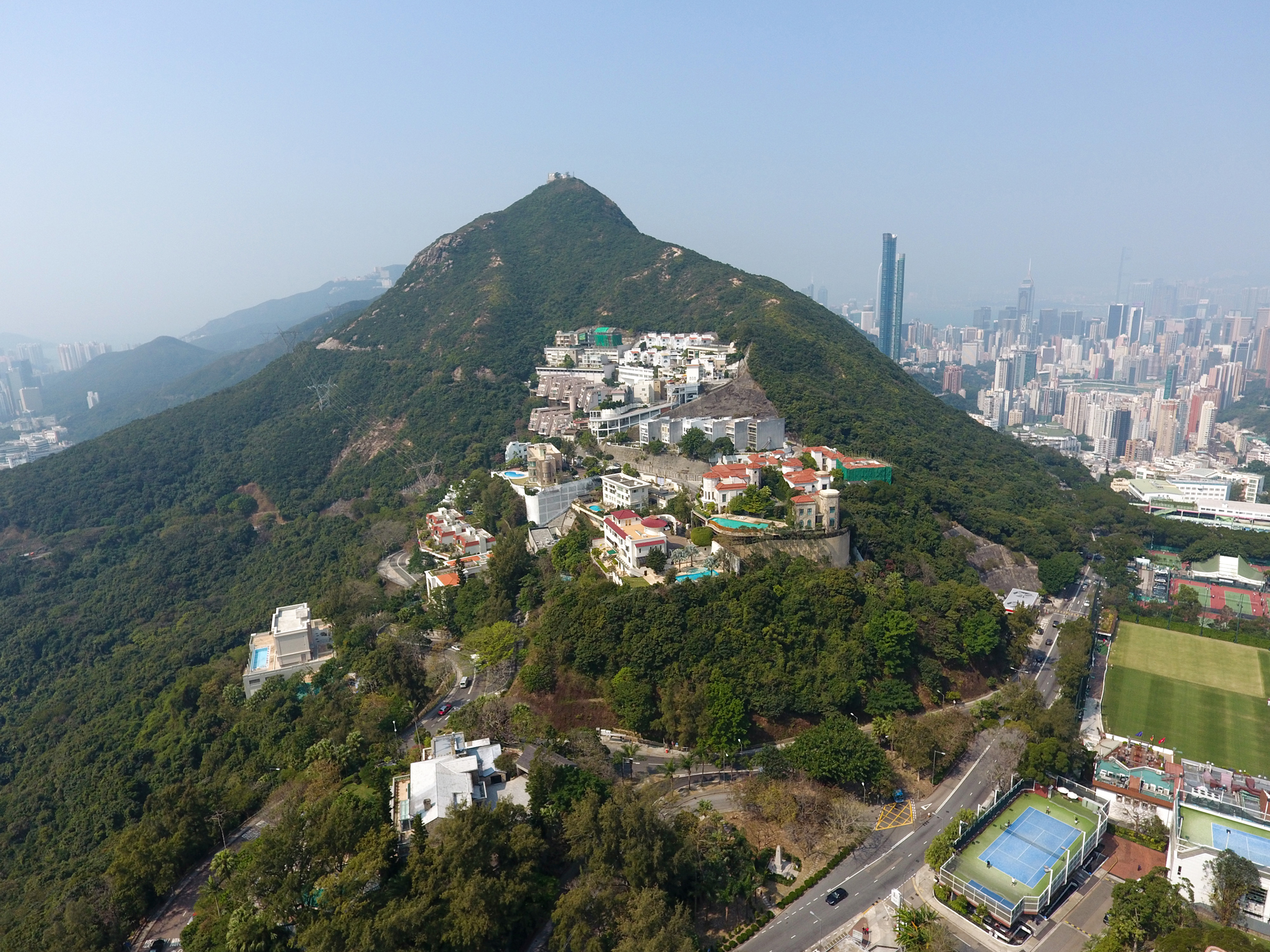
- Mount Nicholson, viewed from Wong Nai Chung Reservoir Park

Highest point
- Elevation: 430 m (1,410 ft)
- Coordinates: 22°15′34″N 114°11′09″E

Geography
- Location within Hong Kong
- Location: Hong Kong

Mount Nicholson (Chinese: 聶高信山) is a 430 m (1,411 ft) tall mountain located in Wan Chai District, on Hong Kong Island, Hong Kong. The hill is believed to be named for Hong Kong Volunteer Corps Adjutant Lieutenant W.C.A. Nicholson.

Mount Nicholson, a development by Nan Fung Group, is located within the Peak Area of Outline Zoning Plan. It is geographically located on Mid-Levels East and near Jardin'es Lookout according to property agencies' areas. Black's Link, although it is also within The Peak Area of Outline Zoning Plan, is geographically near Deep Water Bay. This leads to Victoria Peak or The Peak often wrongly regarded as the most expensive area in Hong Kong, which after 2023 has not been one of the top three most expensive areas in Hong Kong .

== History ==
The 1st Rover Moot in Hong Kong was held by The Scout Association of Hong Kong in August 1940 at Mount Nicholson.

== Features ==
The southern side of the mountain is flanked by the Hong Kong Trail Section 4 - Black's Link. On the eastern side are a few residential blocks close to Wong Nai Chung Gap Road. Mount Cameron is found to the west and separated by the Aberdeen Tunnel. Microwave equipment for television broadcasting (one concrete structure) are found at the mountain's peak and closed from public access by fencing and topped with barbed wire.

A climbing wall is found on the northside of the mountain with access via Wong Nai Chung Gap Road.

== Flora and fauna ==
Part of the mountain is covered with trees and other plants. Camellia hongkongensis and Rhododendron hongkongensis, two plant species native to Hong Kong, that were first discovered on the mountain.

The Nam Fung Road fung shui wood spreads along the south face of Mount Nicholson. The 4-hectare (or 8-hectare, depending on the source) fung shui wood was designated a Site of Special Scientific Interests in 1993.

Commonly found animals are wild boars, porcupines, and stray cats.

== See also ==
- List of mountains, peaks and hills in Hong Kong
- Hong Kong Trail
