= Nam Fung Road =

Road in the Southern District, Hong Kong

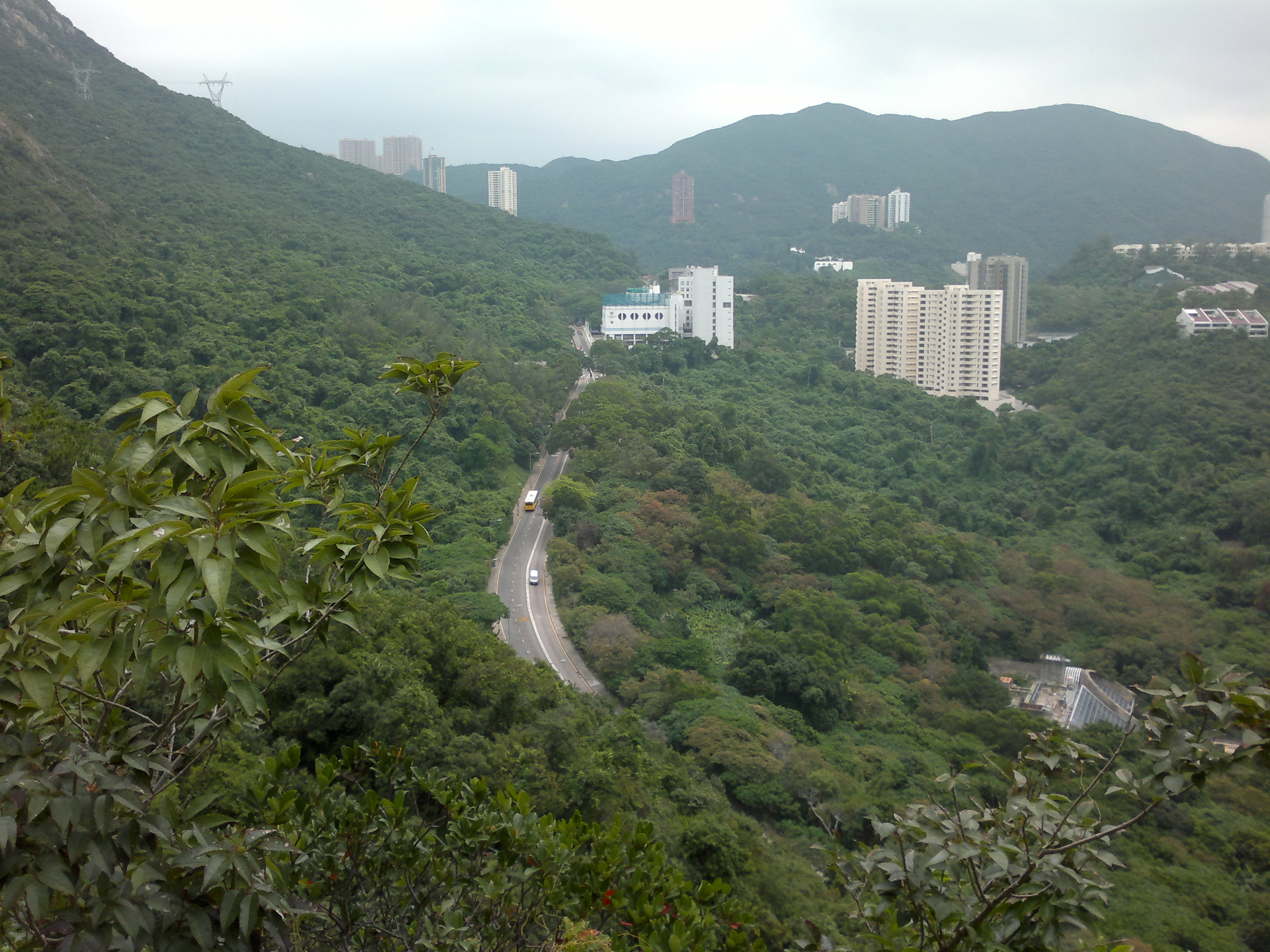
Nam Fung Road near Aberdeen Tunnel southern entrances. South Island School is visible in the centre. The Nam Fung Road Woodland SSSI is located on the left side of the road, on the slope of Mount Nicholson.

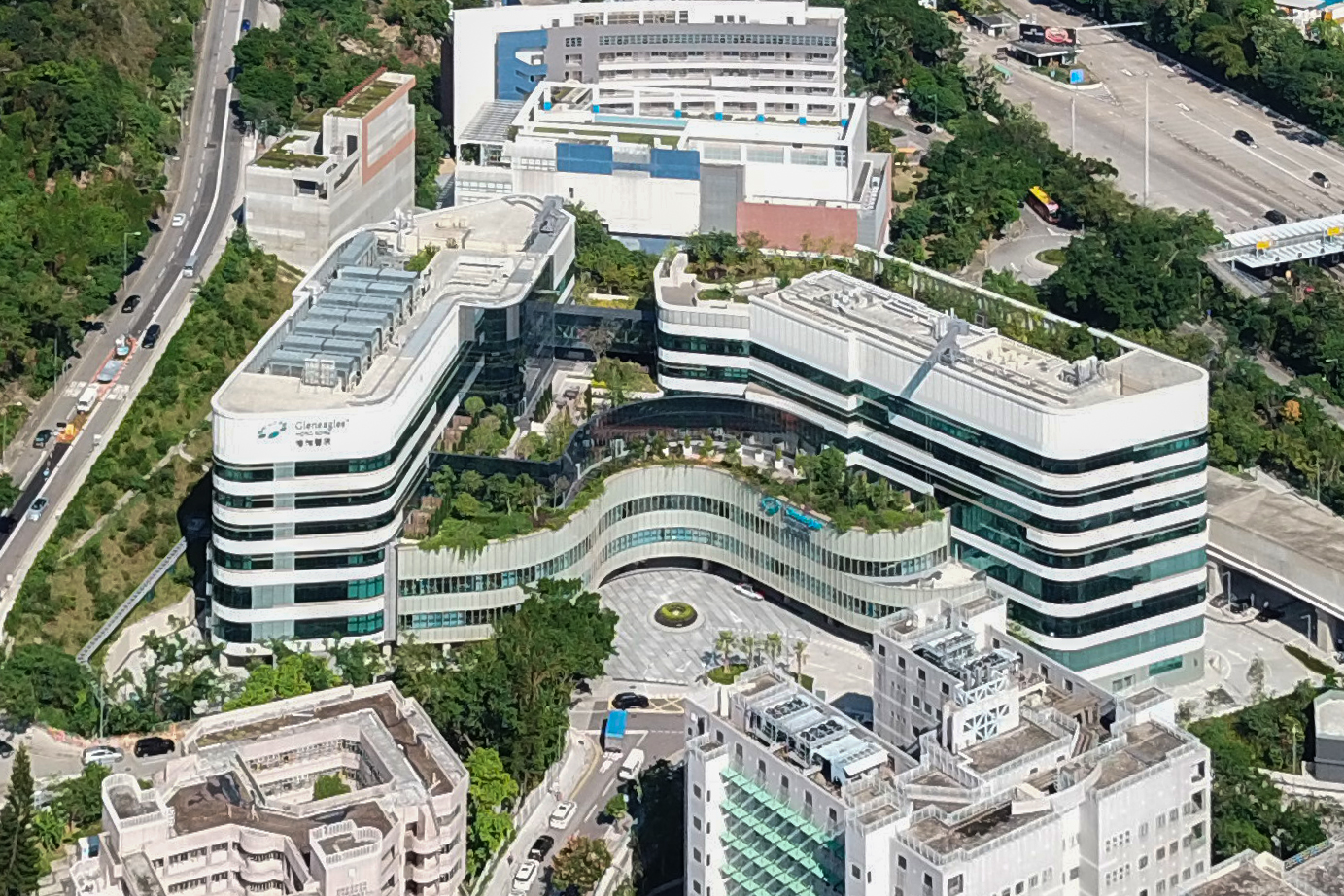
Nam Fung Road (left) along the Gleneagles Hong Kong Hospital. The Aberdeen Tunnel toll plaza is on the right.

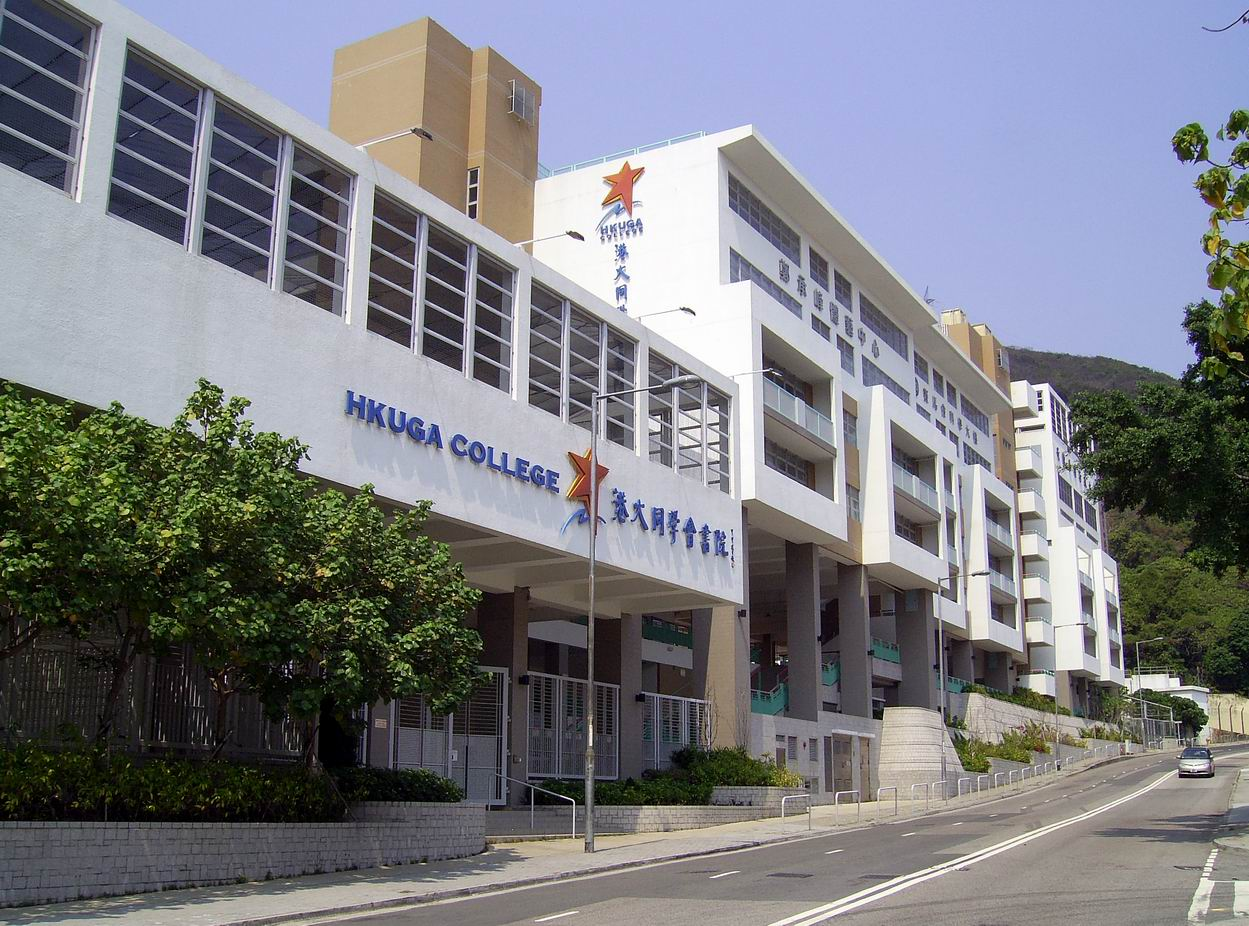
Hong Kong University Graduate Association College along Nam Fung Road.

Nam Fung Road (Chinese: 南風道) is a road in the Southern District of Hong Kong. It connects Wong Chuk Hang Road near Ocean Park station in the west to Deep Water Bay Road in the east.

== History ==
Nam Fung Road was opened in July 1973. The opening of the road provided a direct link for buses between Eastern District and the areas of Aberdeen and Wong Chuk Hang in Southern District. It drastically cut travel distance and time and improved the convenience of commuting between the northern and the southern parts of Hong Kong Island.

== Features ==
Features along the road include (from west to east):

- Aberdeen Fire Station cum Ambulance Depot (No. 1)
- Hong Kong University Graduate Association College (No. 9)
- Gleneagles Hong Kong Hospital
- South Island School (No. 50)

== Conservation ==
The Nam Fung Road fung shui wood spreads along the south face of Mount Nicholson, while Nam Fung Road marks its southern border. The wood is traversed by Lady Clementi's Ride (金夫人馳馬徑). The 4-hectare (or 8-hectare, depending on the source) fung shui is at an elevation of about 80m to 120m above sea level. The dominating trees include Endospermum chinense, Schima superba, Artocarpus hypargyreus, Bridelia insulana, and Mallotus paniculatus. The woodland was designated a Site of Special Scientific Interests in 1993.
