= Wong Nai Chung Gap =

Mountain pass in Hong Kong

Coordinates: 22°15′26″N 114°11′33″E

- Traditional Chinese: 黃泥涌峽
- Literal meaning: The gorge that yellow mud is gushing out of
- Yale Romanization: Wòhng nàih chūng haahp
- Jyutping: Wong^{4} nai^{4} cung^{1} haap^{6}

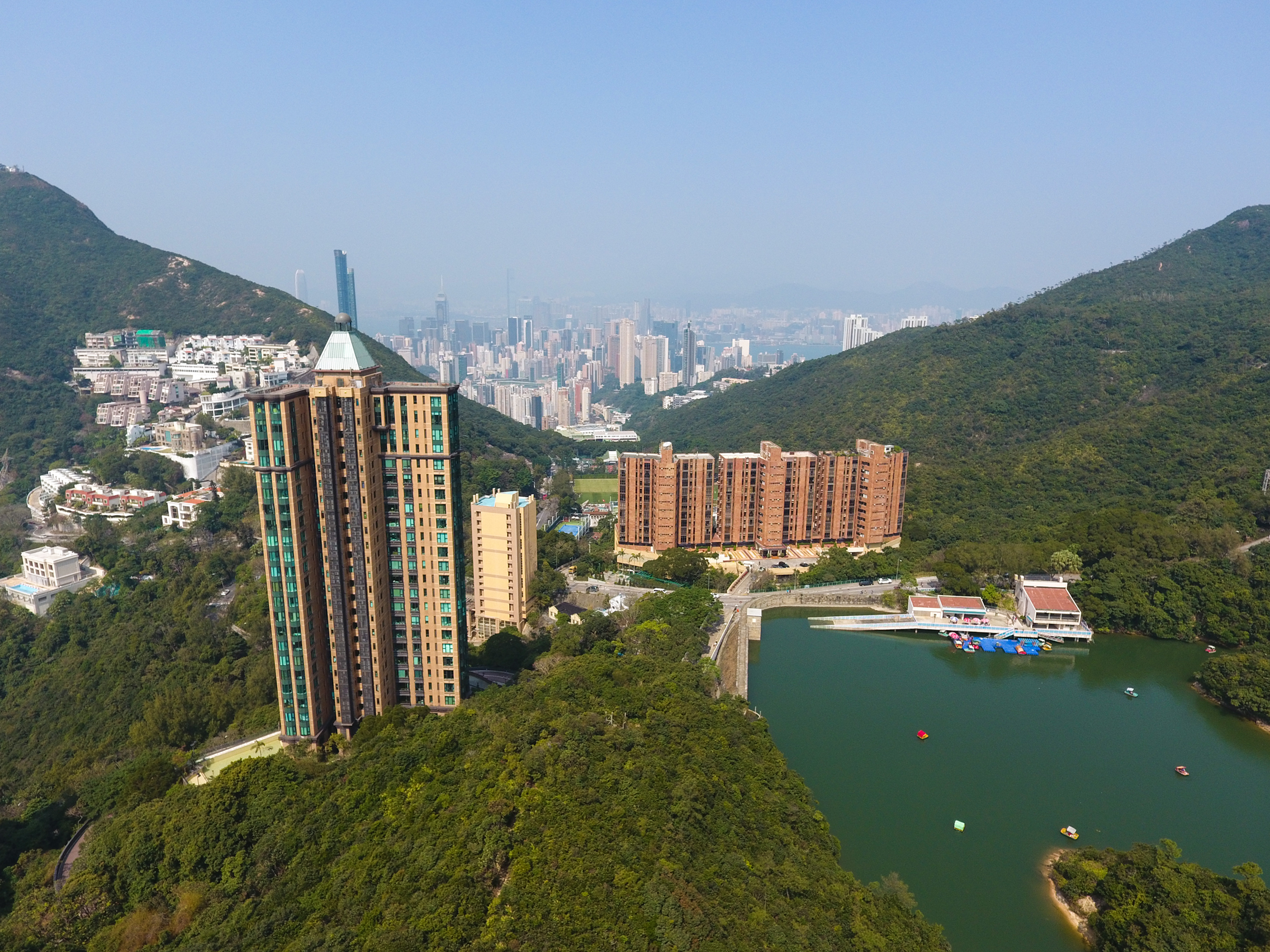
Aerial view of Wong Nai Chung Gap

Wong Nai Chung Gap (Chinese: 黃泥涌峽; lit. 'The gorge that yellow mud is gushing out of') is a geographic gap in the middle of Hong Kong Island in Hong Kong. The gap is between Mount Nicholson and Jardine's Lookout behind Wong Nai Chung (Happy Valley). Five roads meet at the gap: Wong Nai Chung Gap Road, Tai Tam Reservoir Road, Repulse Bay Road, Deep Water Bay Road and Black's Link. It is a strategic passage between the north and south of the island, though less so today since the opening of the Aberdeen Tunnel.

== History ==
In the 1930s, the British army began installing defence structures at the gap as a strategically important location, being the primary passage between the North and South of Hong Kong Island. Defensive structures included bunkers along Wong Nai Chung Gap Road, along with fortifications on Jardine's Lookout, near the end of Sir Cecil's Ride.

=== Battle of Hong Kong ===
The Battle of Wong Nai Chung Gap was the largest sustainment of casualties in a single day, on both sides, in the whole conflict. Its subsequent capture by the Japanese effectively led to the downfall of Hong Kong Island, splitting the forces there in two (Separating East/West Brigades). At the time of this Battle, the Wong Nai Chung Gap area included defenders of the Middlesex Regiment, The Winnipeg Grenadiers and the HKVDC. Canadian Army Brigadier John K. Lawson was present at the HQ and involved in the Battle.

On 18 December, the Japanese had landed around present-day Taikoo Shing (then Taikoo Dockyard) and had made advances into the North Point area. They moved up towards Wong Nai Chung Gap from Braemar Hill through the primary use of Sir Cecil's Ride, but also through Wan Chai and Happy Valley. Primary engagements occurred around the area of Jardine's Catch-water, where there were two pillboxes manned mainly by Middlesex Machine Gunners (JLO1/2). Royal Scots on Mount Nicholson also became engaged in fighting the Japanese advance units on the adjacent Jardine's Lookout, but also those coming up Happy Valley/Wan Chai area.

The superior Japanese force soon closed in on the West Brigade HQ, before the staff and other units could be evacuated. The conflict ensued for a long period, with defenders holding out and inflicting heavy casualties through the use of heavy machine gun fire. The defenders were surrounded and pinned down, with few units able to get through to relieve them. The defense finally deteriorated after nearly every defender was either killed or wounded. Even Brigadier Lawson made a call to Fortress HQ, saying he was going outside to ‘fight it out’ and was killed in action. Few stragglers managed to escape and the remainder of the soldiers (almost all wounded) were taken prisoner.

The Japanese held the position against a number of counterattacks, and were able to effectively split the Commonwealth forces in Hong Kong Island. This was key factor that led to the downfall of the colony on 25 December Surrender.
