= Wong Nai Chung Reservoir Park =

Park and artificial lake in Hong Kong

Coordinates: 22.2568°N 114.1945°E

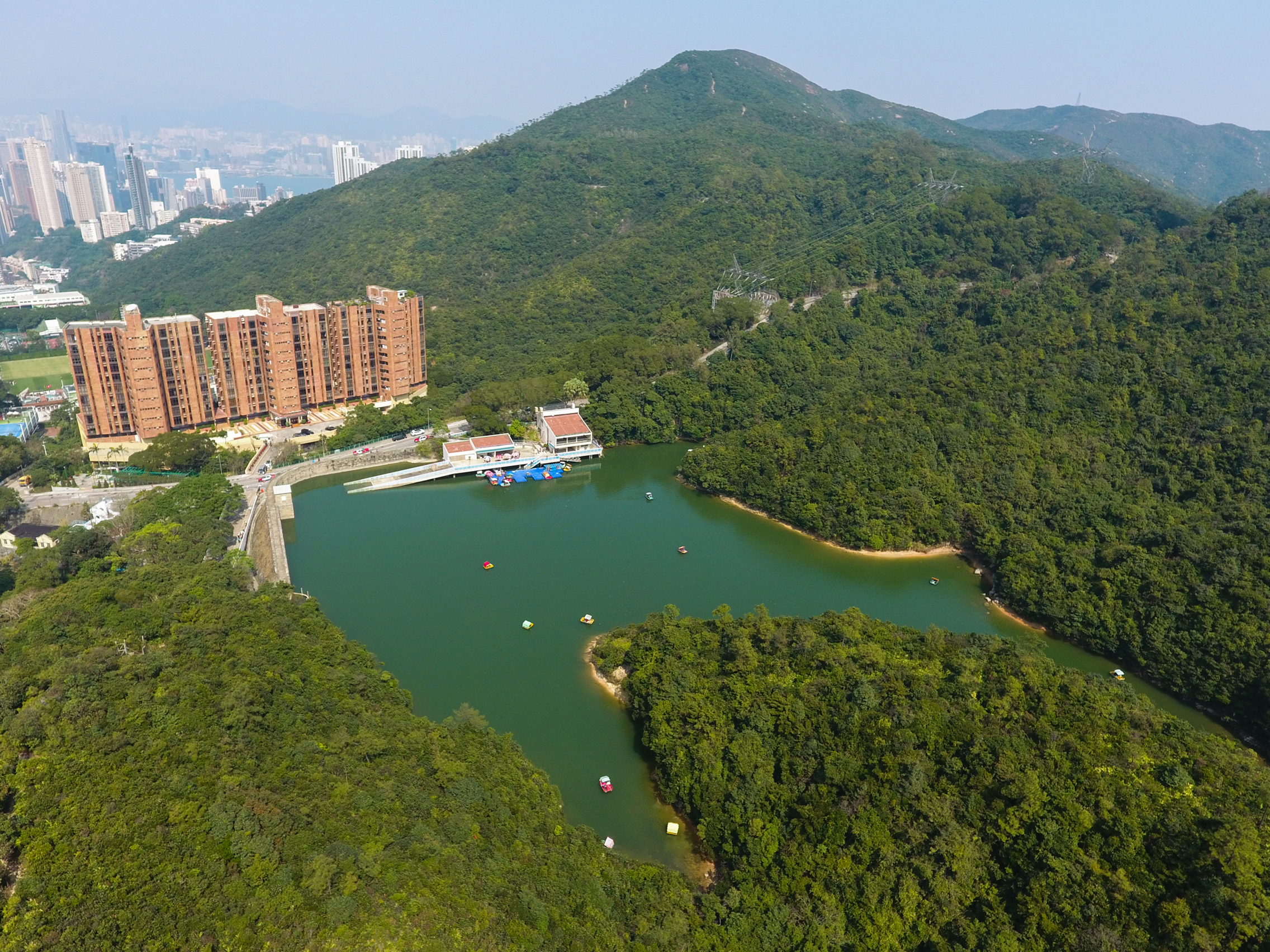
- Wong Nai Chung Reservoir

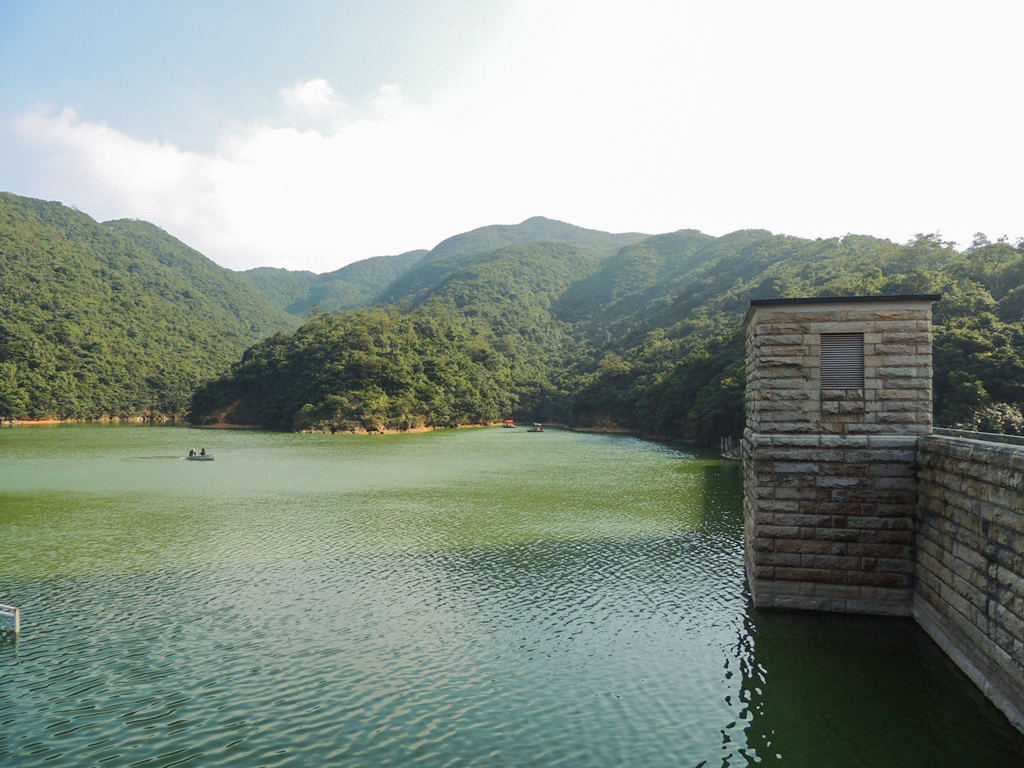
- Artificial lake in Wong Nai Chung Reservoir Park
- Traditional Chinese: 黃泥涌水塘公園
Transcriptions
Standard Mandarin
- Hanyu Pinyin: Huáng ní yǒng shuǐtáng gōngyuán
- Wade–Giles: Huang ni yung shuit'ang kungyüan
- Yale Romanization: Huáng ni yǒng shuǐtáng gōngyuán
- IPA: [xwâŋ nǐ jʊ̀ŋ ʂwèɪtʰâŋ kʊ́ŋɥɛ̌n]
Yue: Cantonese
- Yale Romanization: Wòhng naìh chūng seuítòhng gūngyùhn
- Jyutping: Wong4 nai4 cung1 seoi2tong4 gung1jyun4
- IPA: [wɔ̏ːŋ nɐ̏i tsʰʊ́ŋ sɵ̌ytʰɔ̏ːŋ kʊ́ŋjy̏ːn]

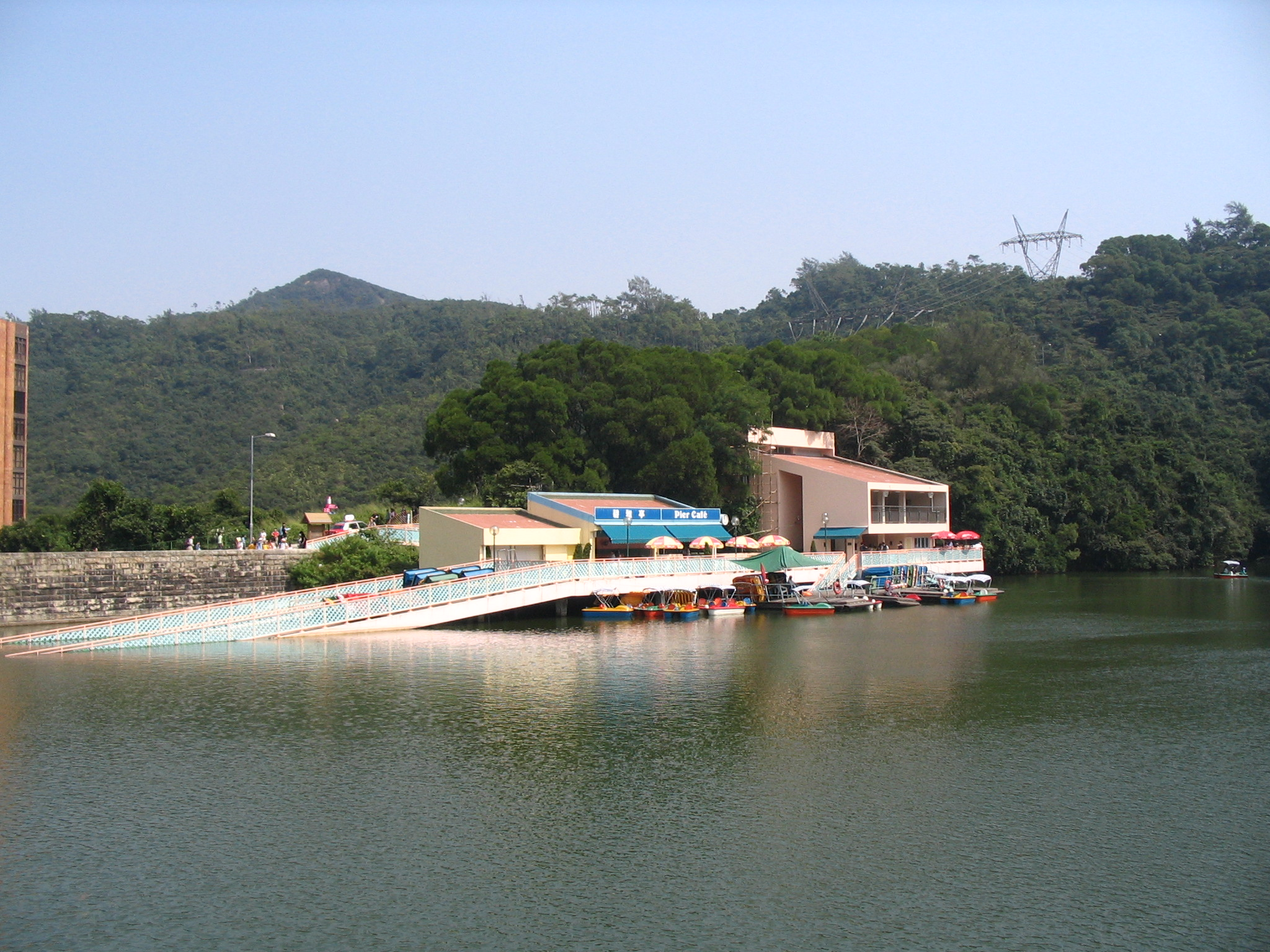
Artificial lake in Wong Nai Chung Reservoir Park

Wong Nai Chung Reservoir Park is a park and artificial lake in the Wong Nai Chung Gap, Wong Nai Chung, Hong Kong, located near Hong Kong Parkview. It was formerly Wong Nai Chung Reservoir (黃泥涌水塘), a closed reservoir in Hong Kong.

== Background ==
Wong Nai Chung Reservoir was the third reservoir in Hong Kong, built in 1889 in Tai Tam Reservoir Road, Wong Nai Chung. Before closure, it had only water storage capacity of just 27 million imperial gallons (120,000 m^{3}), only 38% of the size of its Pok Fu Lam counterpart. Because of its small water storage capacity, the British Hong Kong Government decided to cease operations at the reservoir. The reservoir was then converted to Wong Nai Chung Reservoir Park and opened to the public in 1986. It provided water sports facilities like sampans and boats till 14 February 2017.

Some of the components of the reservoir, including the weir, the dam and the valve house, were classified as Grade III historic buildings.

A total of 41 pre-World War II waterworks structures located in six reservoir areas, namely Pok Fu Lam Reservoir, Tai Tam Group of Reservoirs, Wong Nai Chung Reservoir, Kowloon Reservoir, Shing Mun (Jubilee) Reservoir and Aberdeen Reservoir, were declared as monuments in September 2009. The weir, the dam and value house of Wong Nai Chung Reservoir are now declared monuments.
