= Hong Kong Monopoly =

Board game

Hong Kong Monopoly is an edition of the popular board game Monopoly. It features properties, railroads and utilities located in Hong Kong, in place of those from the original game.

The Hong Kong edition was originally released in 1965 by John Waddingtons. Ltd. and manufactured in Hong Kong by A.F Tompson & Son LTD. The Chinese game name called "財源廣進", and an updated version from Parker Brothers/Kenner Parker Toys LTD. was released in 1973. The name called "大富翁". In 1997 a Commemorative Edition was released to mark the Transfer of Sovereignty of Hong Kong. Another version was released in 2001 also by Parker Brothers/Hasbro Hong Kong Ltd. The most recent version, released in 2007, is a limited edition commemorating the 10th Anniversary of the Handover. Each copy of the 10th anniversary edition game has a unique number and includes a certificate of authenticity.

Properties are well-known locations all over the territory of Hong Kong. The four railways are MTR stations, while in the latest versions, those being the initial four stations of the Airport Express.

The 1997 Commemorative Edition brought further changes from the Monopoly standard. Player pieces include Hong Kong symbols.

A more widespread version of Monopoly also exists in Hong Kong. These unofficial versions were published by local companies and cost much less. All the words are in Chinese. Some well-known locations, like Shaw's Studio are considered outdated nowadays.

A "special BAUHINIA Token only for HK" edition dated 2000 by Hasbro uses Chinese and English side-by-side.

== Board layout ==
Hong Kong Monopoly game board layout (1991 and 1993 version)

Free Parking	Chatham Road $220	Chance	Mody Road $220	Nathan Road $240	Central station $200	Connaught Road Central $260	Queen's Road Central $260	Hong Kong Telecom $150	Des Voeux Road Central $280	Go To Stanley Jail
Village Road $200	MONOPOLY									Hong Kong Convention and Exhibition Centre $300
Wong Nai Chung Road $180	MONOPOLY									Pacific Place $300
Community Chest	MONOPOLY									Community Chest
Blue Pool Road $180	MONOPOLY									Exchange Square $320
Causeway Bay station $200	MONOPOLY									Tsim Sha Tsui station $200
Discovery Bay $160	MONOPOLY									Chance
Lamma Island $140	MONOPOLY									Repulse Bay $350
Hongkong Electric $150	MONOPOLY									Salary Tax (pay $100)
Sai Kung $140	MONOPOLY									The Peak $400
Stanley Jail	Sha Tin $120	Tsuen Wan $100	Chance	Yuen Long $100	Kowloon Tong station $200	Income Tax (pay 10% or $200)	Wan Chai $60	Community Chest	Mong Kok $60	Go (collect $200)

Hong Kong Monopoly game board layout (1995 version)

Free Parking	Village Road $2200	Provincial	Wong Nai Chung Road $2200	Blue Pool Road $2400	Central station $2000	Connaught Road Central $2600	Queen's Road Central $2600	Water Works $1500	Des Voeux Road Central $2800	Go To Stanley Jail
Sai Kung $2000	MONOPOLY									Robinson Road $3000
Discovery Bay $1800	MONOPOLY									Magazine Gap Road $3000
Community Chest	MONOPOLY									Community Chest
Wan Chai $1800	MONOPOLY									Repulse Bay $3200
Causeway Bay station $2000	MONOPOLY									Tsim Sha Tsui station $2000
Sha Tin $1600	MONOPOLY									Chance
Ma On Shan $1400	MONOPOLY									South Bay $3500
Hongkong Electric $1500	MONOPOLY									Salary Tax (pay $1000)
Nathan Road $1400	MONOPOLY									The Peak $4000
Stanley Jail	Granville Road $1200	Mong Kok $1000	Chance	Tsuen Wan $1000	Kowloon Tong station $2000	Income Tax (pay 10% or $2000)	Tuen Mun $600	Community Chest	Cheung Chau $600	Go (collect $2000)

Hong Kong Monopoly game board layout (2000 version)

Free Parking	Lei Yue Mun $2200	Provincial	Wong Tai Sin $2200	Kowloon Tong $2400	Kowloon station $2000	Sham Shui Po $2600	Mong Kok $2600	Water Works $1500	Tsim Sha Tsui $2800	Go To Stanley Jail
Sai Kung $2000	MONOPOLY									Causeway Bay $3000
Sha Tin $1800	MONOPOLY									Happy Valley $3000
Community Chest	MONOPOLY									Community Chest
Kwai Chung $1800	MONOPOLY									Central $3200
Tsing Yi station $2000	MONOPOLY									Hong Kong station $2000
Sham Tseng $1600	MONOPOLY									Chance
Yuen Long $1400	MONOPOLY									Repulse Bay $3500
Hongkong Electric $1500	MONOPOLY									Salary Tax (pay $750)
Lo Wu $1400	MONOPOLY									The Peak $4000
Stanley Jail	Lamma Island $1200	Cheung Chau $1000	Chance	Peng Chau $1000	Airport station $2000	Income Tax (pay 10% or $2000)	Mui Wo $600	Community Chest	Chek Lap Kok $600	Go (collect $2000)

Hong Kong Monopoly game board layout (2000 BAUHINIA dual language edition)

Free Parking	Lei Yue Mun $2200	Chance	Wong Tai Sin $2200	Kowloon Tong $2400	Kowloon station $2000	Sham Shui Po $2600	Mong Kok $2600	Water Works $1500	Tsim Sha Tsui $2800	Go To Jail
Sai Kung $2000	MONOPOLY									Causeway Bay $3000
Sha Tin $1800	MONOPOLY									Happy Valley $3000
Community Chest	MONOPOLY									Community Chest
Kwai Chung $1800	MONOPOLY									Central $3200
Tsing Yi station $2000	MONOPOLY									Hong Kong station $2000
Sham Tseng $1600	MONOPOLY									Chance
Yuen Long $1400	MONOPOLY									Repulse Bay $3500
Hong Kong Electric $1500	MONOPOLY									Salary Tax (pay $750)
Lo Wu $1400	MONOPOLY									Victoria Peak $4000
Jail	Lamma Island $1200	Cheung Chau $1000	Chance	Peng Chau $1000	Airport station $2000	Income Tax (pay 10% or $2000)	Mui Wo $600	Community Chest	Chek Lap Kok $600	Go (collect $2000)

== See also ==
- Licensed and localized editions of Monopoly
