= St. Jude's Church, Hong Kong =

Coordinates: 22.2893°N 114.1979°E

St. Jude's Church
- 聖猶達堂
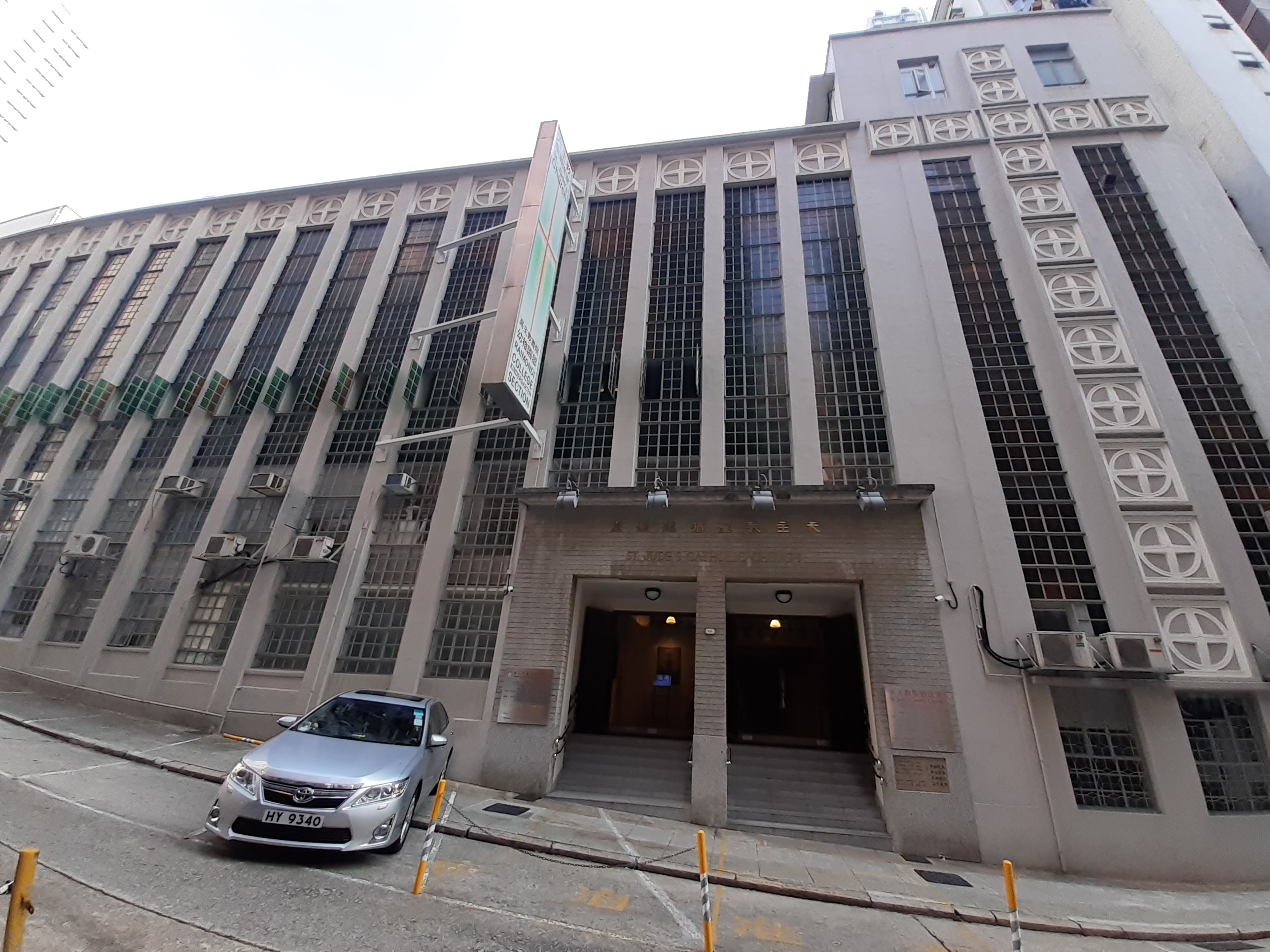
- St Jude's Catholic Church, 2021
- St. Jude's Church
- Location: No. 30 Kin Wah Street, North Point, Hong Kong
- Website: www.stjudechurch.org.hk

History
- Status: Parish Church
- Founded: 6 November 1955; 70 years ago
- Consecrated: 15 December 1957; 68 years ago

Administration
- Diocese: Hong Kong

Clergy
- Bishop: Stephen Chow
- Priest: Timothy Wan

St. Jude's Church (Chinese: 聖猶達堂) is a Roman Catholic church located in North Point, Hong Kong.

== History ==
In 1953, the Bishop of Hong Kong, Lorenzo Bianchi, had assigned Fr. Giorgio Caruso PIME to set up a temporary chapel and the chapel is named St. Jude's Chapel, which is affiliated to St. Margaret's Church at Happy Valley.

The original chapel was not sufficient to cope with the increasing number of laity; Bishop Bianchi applied from the government for a piece of land in North Point for constructing a new church and school to replace St. Jude’s Chapel.

On 6 November 1955, Bishop Bianchi celebrated a Holy Mass for the commencement of the construction of St. Jude’s Church at No. 30 Kin Wah Street.

The church's foundation stone was laid by Bishop Bianchi on 17 June 1957, and the church was officially consecrated on 15 December at the same year.

== See also ==
- List of Catholic churches in Hong Kong
