= Marymount Primary School =

Primary school on Hong Kong Island, Hong Kong

Coordinates: 22.2630°N 114.1905°E

Marymount Primary School (Chinese: 瑪利曼小學) is a Catholic primary school located on Tai Hang Road, Happy Valley, Hong Kong Island, Hong Kong. The secondary school arm is Marymount Secondary School.

== History ==
The school, originally known as Holy Spirit School, was founded by the Maryknoll Sisters, an American religious order, on 10 January 1927 in Hong Kong. Back then, the school was on Robinson Road in Central Mid-levels. There were only eight classes of students sharing four small classrooms. In the 1930s, the school moved to a slightly larger building in Caine Road. There were seven classrooms, but conditions were still cramped by today’s standards. By 1941, the school was offering a complete course leading to matriculation, and so was one of only a small handful of schools at that time which prepared girls for university.

In 1941, Japanese forces invaded and occupied Hong Kong. The school was closed until 1948. When the school reopened, it was renamed Maryknoll School.

As the school continued to expand, a new building with better facilities became necessary. In October 1957, the school moved to its present location on the wooded slopes at the top of Blue Pool Road, overlooking Happy Valley. At the same time, it was renamed Maryknoll Sisters’ School. Initially, the building housed both Secondary and Primary Sections, but in 1961 the Primary School was relocated to the premises at Tai Hang Road, directly above the secondary school. During the school year 1978–79, the Maryknoll Sisters handed over the sponsorship of the school to the Columban Sisters.

In September 1983, the name of the school changed to Marymount Primary School, and discontinued accepting male students. The sponsorship of the school was transferred by the Columban Sisters to the Christian Life Community in 1998.

In 2002, the school moved to 22 Cloud View Road, North Point and started operation of whole-day schooling. The old Tai Hang Road primary school was torn down and rebuilt. Marymount Primary School moved back to Tai Hang Road in September 2006.

From 1921–1953 (excluding closure during WWII) From the original Holy Spirit school through the Maryknoll Sisters School; The Primary and secondary arms of these schools were mainly girls admissions. Certain few exceptions were made for a small number of boys at grades Kindergarten through form 2 only in Maryknoll Sisters Primary School. Form 3 and higher levels were only girl admissions. Presently as Marymount both MPS and its secondary arm, Marymount Secondary School(MSS), are schools for girls only. Biography Maryknoll Principal Sr. Miriam Xavier Mug

== Notable alumni ==
- Stephen Fung - Actor/Director
- Agnes Chan - Singer
- Angela Au - Pianist
- Emily Lau - Politician/Journalist
