= Marymount Secondary School =

Roman catholic secondary school in Hong Kong

Coordinates: 22.263482°N 114.190221°E

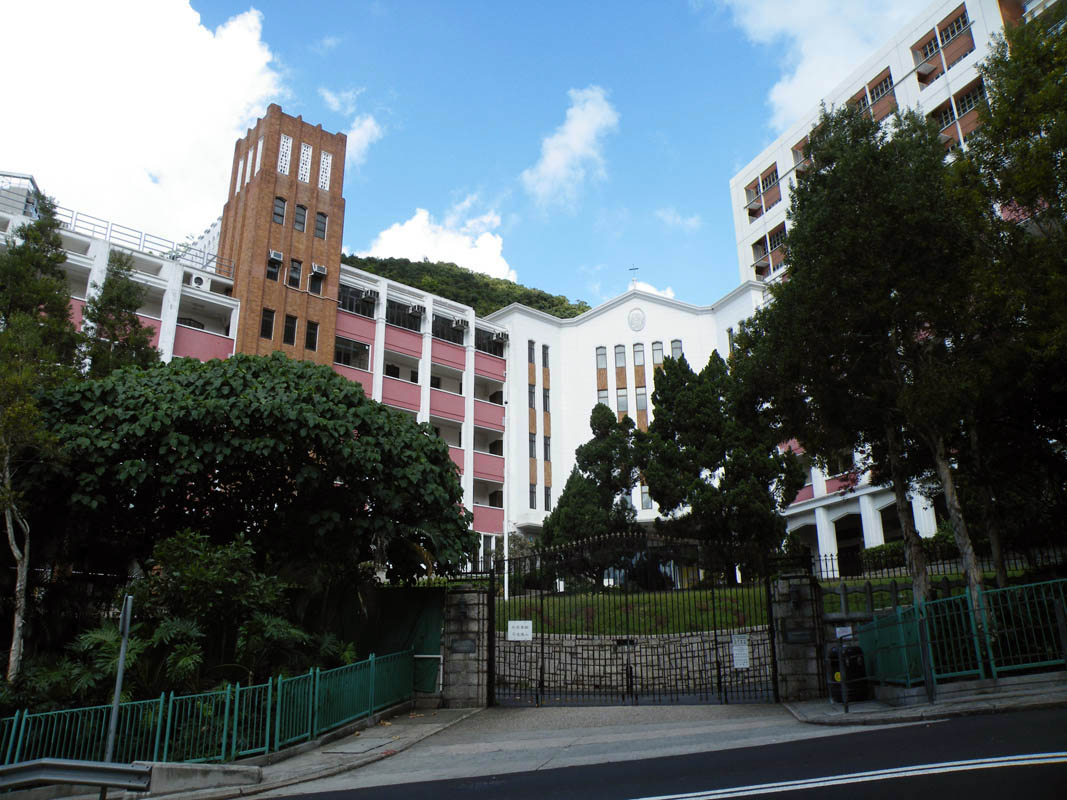
- Entrance of Marymount Secondary School at No. 123 Blue Pool Road
- Happy Valley, Hong Kong

Information
- School type: Grant School
- Motto: The Lord is My Light
- Established: 1927
- Principal: Mr Kyle Chan
- Houses: Jupiter, Mercury, Uranus, Venus
- Colours: Blue and yellow
- Affiliation: Roman Catholic
- Website: www.mss.edu.hk

Marymount Secondary School
- Traditional Chinese: 瑪利曼中學
- Simplified Chinese: 玛利曼中学
Transcriptions
Standard Mandarin
- Hanyu Pinyin: Mǎlìmàn zhōngxué
Yue: Cantonese
- Jyutping: maa5 lei6 maan6 zung1 hok6

Marymount Secondary School (Abbreviation: MSS; Chinese: 瑪利曼中學; Demonym: Marymountian) is a Roman Catholic secondary school located on Blue Pool Road in Happy Valley, Hong Kong Island, Hong Kong. The medium of instruction is English. It is associated with a primary school, Marymount Primary School.

== History ==
The school, originally known as Holy Spirit School, was founded by the Maryknoll Sisters, an American religious order, on 10 January 1927 in Hong Kong. Back then, the school was on Robinson Road in Central Mid-levels. There were only 8 classes of students sharing four tiny classrooms. In the 1930s, the school moved to a slightly larger building in Caine Road. There were seven classrooms, but conditions were still cramped by today's standards. By 1941, the school was offering a complete course leading to matriculation, and so was one of only a small handful of schools at that time which prepared girls for university.

In 1941, Japanese forces invaded and occupied Hong Kong. The school was closed until 1948. When the school reopened, Hong Kong was facing a new challenge as many thousands of immigrants were pouring across the border to escape the civil war in China. In response, Marymount offered places to as many girls as it could.

As the school continued to expand, a new building with better facilities became necessary. In October 1957, the school moved to its present location on the wooded slopes near the top of Blue Pool Road, overlooking Happy Valley. At the same time, it was renamed Maryknoll Sisters' School. Initially, the building housed both Secondary and Primary Sections, but in 1961 the Primary School was relocated to the premises at Tai Hang Road, directly above the secondary school. During the school year 1978–79, the Maryknoll Sisters handed over the sponsorship of the school to the Columban Sisters.

In September 1983, the name of the school was changed to Marymount Secondary School. Throughout its history the school campus had also been home to a convent, with the nun's dormitories housed on the fourth floor and the site of the library originally being a chapel. It was only in 1993 that the nuns vacated their premises in order to make more room for the ever-growing student population.

In 1991, Mrs. Nancy Wong became the school's first ethnic Chinese principal, and the first principal who was not a member of a religious order.

In 1996, the Columban Sisters initiated the transfer of the sponsorship of the school to the Christian Life Community(CLC) in Hong Kong, the process of which was completed by July 1997. The CLC is an international Catholic lay Ignatius community with their spirituality based on the Spiritual Exercises of St. Ignatius of Loyola, the Founder of the Society of Jesus.

Mrs. Wong oversaw the school's transition from being managed by the Columban Sisters to being managed by the CLC and retired in 2003. The post of principal was taken up by Ms. Veronica MA, M.H. till her retirement in 2014, then after Mrs. Julia Ma who left in 2017. In 2017–2020, Mrs. Catherine A. Thirlwell LI, alumna of both Marymount Primary School and Marymount Secondary School, was the principal. Subsequently, Dr. Daphne Ho served in the post during 2020-2023. Currently, Mr. Kyle Chan is the principal of the school.

Over the years, many generations of girls have received an education at Marymount, and the primary and secondary School together now accommodate nearly 2000 students.

== Curriculum ==
English and Chinese are the mediums of instruction. In forms one and two, a Common Test is administered twice a year in place of conventional exams. Grades are given according to continuous assessment throughout the school year instead of just basing on exam results. A modular system is adopted in order to facilitate project-based learning and critical thinking. Notably, S1 students take part in the JUMP program, S2 students in LEAD+ project. S4 students dedicate themselves to a year-long endeavor in the GROW! Project working non-profit organisations to promote a social cause. In senior forms, students prepare for the HKDSE and select subjects from option blocks. In the past MSS offered French in place of Chinese Language for students whose first language is not Chinese, but this option was discontinued in 2012 and replaced by an alternative Chinese curriculum.

== School motto ==
The school's motto is "The Lord is My Light".

== Houses ==
There are four houses to which students and teachers are randomly assigned.

- Jupiter – Red
- Mercury – Yellow
- Uranus – Orange
- Venus – Blue

Each house is headed by a House Committee and 2 Teacher Advisors, the House Committee includes a House Captain, two Vice-Captains, a Cheering Leader and 7 form representatives (2 for S.1 and 1 for S. 2–6) who are elected by students. Every year, students compete in inter-House events, such as the annual Sports Day and Swimming Gala. Scores are counted at the end of the Academic Year, and the house with the highest score is named Overall Champion.

== Student council ==
Marymount has an elected student council which promotes student welfare and acts as a channel of communication between the school and the student body as well as organising a range of activities throughout the year, including the Talent Quest, Good Samaritan Lunch, Student and Teacher Appreciation Weeks, and the Fun Fair. Students can take part in the student council (colloquially known as the "SC") as elected class representatives in the role of spokesman or councillor, or as the executive board's chairlady, vice-chairlady, ECA coordinator, service coordinator, sports coordinator, secretary, treasurer or public relations officer. The executive board members are nominated by students, and elected by the students. The spokesman and the councillor of each class are elected by its own class members.

== Talent quest ==
The Student Council's largest-scale project each year is the Talent Quest, colloquially known as "TQ". The event takes the form of a multi-stage talent show divided into different categories:

- Chinese Solo (Singing)
- Chinese Group (Singing)
- English Solo (Singing)
- English Group (Singing)
- Dance
- Foreign
- Open
- Class
- Fashion

Subsequent to heats and semi-final rounds held throughout the first term of the school year, finalists perform for the title of Champion in each category, as well as Overall Champion. The adjudicating panel is normally made up of three industry professionals in the fields of music, dance, and fashion design respectively. Tickets are on sale to the public and the audience is generally made up of members of the general public as well as the MSS community. The Talent Quest is highly valued by the student body as the performing arts, particularly music, are integral to Marymount culture. Many competitors have gone on to have professional careers in music and dance. The Student Council organises the event around a distinct theme each year.

The themes of recent Talent Quests are:

- Agent 1314 (2013)
- Tetrachromacy (2014)
- Atlantis (2015)
- Deja Vu (2016)
- Trouvaille (2017)
- Nefelibata (2018)
- Arcadia (2019)
- Apophenia (2020)
- Kairos (2021)
- Aionia (2022)
- Ataraxia (2023)
- Meraki (2024)
- Alchemy (2025)
- Luminara (2026)

== Religious activity convenor ==
As a Catholic school, Marymount has also an elected committee in which members are responsible for all religious activities in the school. Catholic students can participate in Religious Activity Convenor (colloquially known RAC) as an elected representative known as Class RAC in each class, or in the Executive Board's Chairlady, two Vice Chairladies, Secretary, Treasurer and Public Relations Officer. Every year, the RAC organises Catholic functions and masses such as monthly Friday Morning Mass, Annual Christmas Play, Easter Mass, Chinese Year Mass, Graduation Mass for the S6 graduates, Good Samaritan Lunch (cooperating with Student Council), Catholic Family Mass (cooperating with Marymount Primary School) etc. The class RAC of each class are elected by its own class members during RE lesson in early September. Class RAC also operates the daily morning prayer of each class.

The RAC also monitors different religious groups in the school to spread God's faith and the catholic society.

Religious Groups

- Legion of Mary (The Praesidium was named Mother Most Admirable Praesidium, and was founded in 1959. It is under Curia Mater Dei, the English junior Curia in St. Margaret's Parish, along with other Catholic secondary schools in Wan Chai District)
- MSS CLC (S4-6 only)
- Voveo
- GIFTS (Growing in Faith Through Sharing)
- Shalom
- Curae

== Graduation mass ==
Being a Catholic institution, the school marks most significant occasions with a Mass. In March of each year, a Graduation Mass celebrates S. 6 students completing their education at MSS before they prepare for public exams is heralded by a Graduation Mass. The event gathers the school community and is characterised by the treasured tradition of the school supervisor, principal, and vice principals in lighting a white candle for each graduating girl in a darkened auditorium, symbolising pass it on. Students then protect the flame until the end of the school day and their final departure from school grounds.

Since 1999, the Primary and Secondary Schools have celebrated the Catholic Family Mass in May. Parents and grandparents of students, teachers, students, alumnae, school managers and members of the CLC of Hong Kong gather together to give thanks for the graces and love of God. Marymount Schools are not just institutions where students are educated. Young women grow to become part of the Marymount Community and Marymount Family.

== Notable alumnae ==
=== Government and legal sector ===
- Alpha Lau - Director-General of Invest Hong Kong
- Ms Bernadette Linn - the Secretary for Development of the HKSAR
- Emily Lau – Former Hong Kong Legislative Council Member, former Chairperson of the Democratic Party of Hong Kong
- Anna Wu – Chairperson of the Competition Commission, former President of the Hong Kong Equal Opportunities Commission, non-official member of the Executive Council of Hong Kong, former Chairperson of the Mandatory Provident Fund Schemes Authority, Former Council Member of the Hong Kong International Arbitration Centre
- Catherine Bragg – United Nations Assistant Secretary-General for Humanitarian Affairs
- Carrie Yau, former Director of Administration, former Permanent Secretary for Health, Welfare and Food, former Permanent Secretary for Home Affairs, former executive director of the Vocational Training Council

=== Sports ===
- Venise Chan-Hong Kong former number 1 tennis player

=== Arts and Culture ===
- Agnes Chan – Cantopop singer and educator
- Priscilla Chan – Cantopop singer
- Sandy Lam – Cantopop singer
- Astrid Chan – famous actress and host
- Valerie Chow – former actress, fashion publicist and entrepreneur
- Charlene Choi – actress and singer, member of Cantopop group Twins
- Celina Jade – singer, actress and model
- Joey Wong (JW) – singer and actress
- Tania Chan - Member of Cantopop group LollyTalk

=== Science and Engineering ===
- Flossie Wong-Staal, virologist and molecular biologist, first scientist to clone HIV
