= Broom Road =

Road in Happy Valley, Wan Chai, Hong Kong

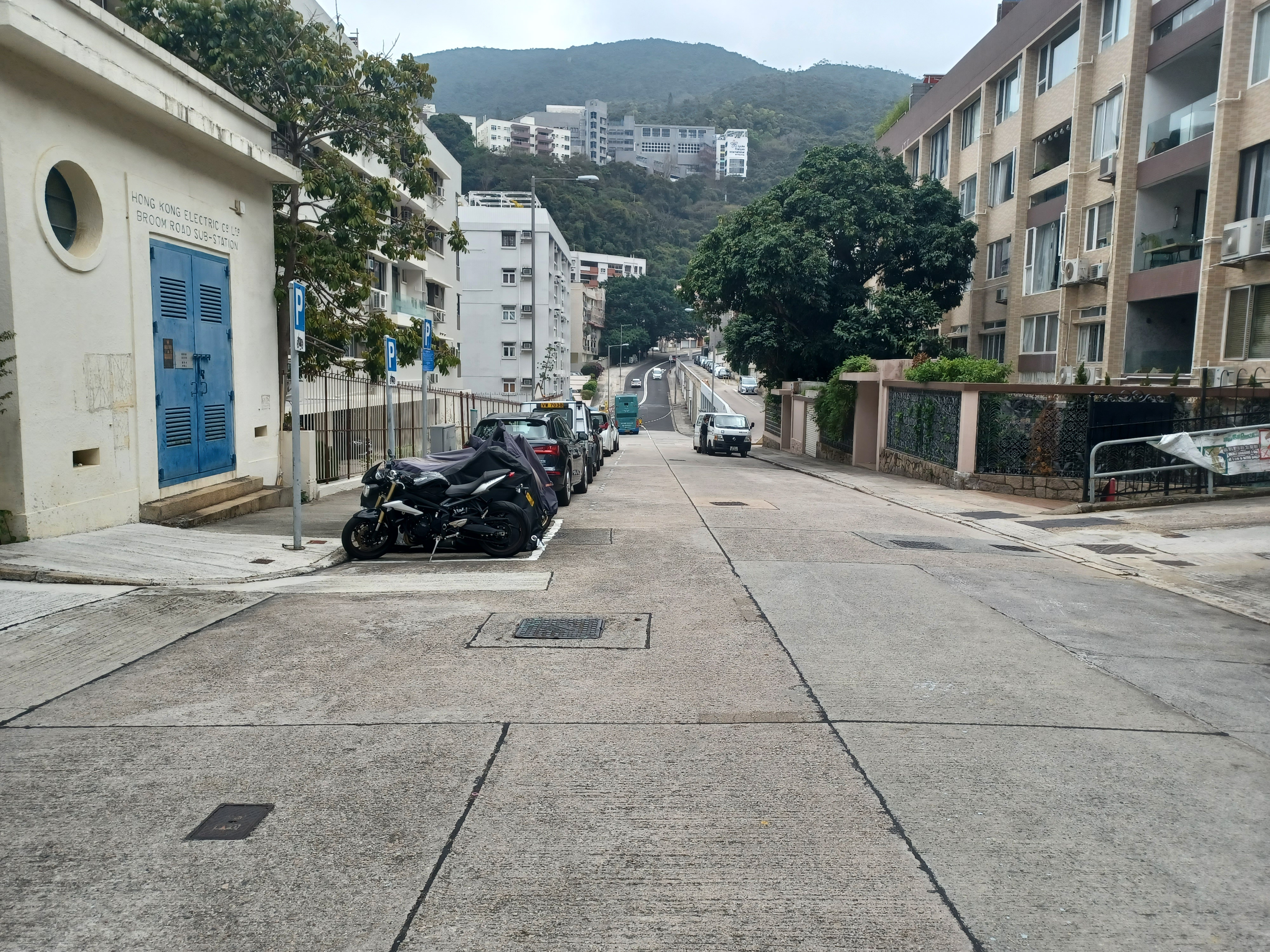
The art deco Hong Kong Electric Co. substation on the western tip of Broom Road

Broom Road (Chinese: 蟠龍道) is a cul-de-sac in Happy Valley on Hong Kong Island. It is named for the common broom, rather than the cleaning implement. Other streets in the immediate area are named according to the same convention, viz. Briar Avenue; Holly Road; Hawthorn Road.

The road runs east-west in a straight line from the junction with Blue Pool Road, and is intersected by a T-junction with Green Lane halfway through.

== History ==
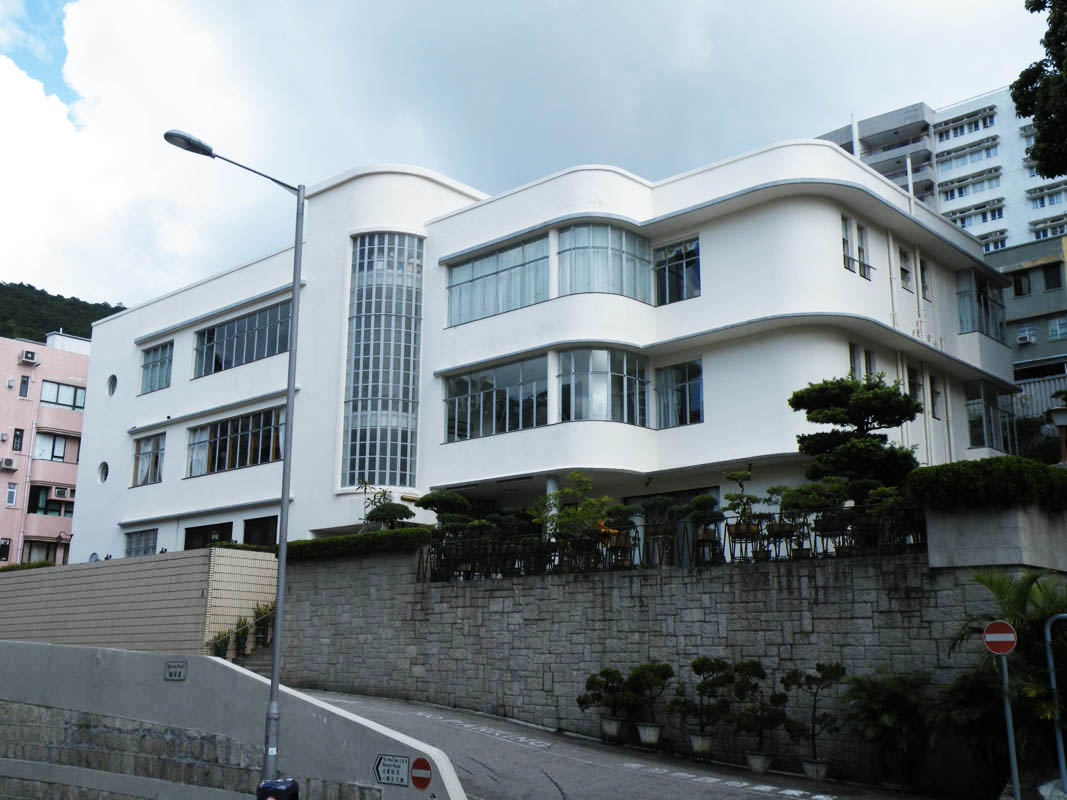
Nos. 5 & 7 Broom Road

Prior to the arrival of the British, the site was occupied by Wong Nai Chong Village (黃泥涌村) which had been founded during the Qianlong period (1736-1795). In 1923, the colonial government began urbanising Happy Valley, and subsequently demolished the village.

Because Hong Kong was under British rule – and therefore relatively safe – it became a major destination for refugees (both Chinese and foreigners) fleeing China in the first half of the 20th century. This was particularly notable during World War II and the Chinese Civil War, resulting in the population of Hong Kong Island increasing substantially. Wan Chai, Happy Valley, Sheung Wan, and Sai Wan subsequently became one of the first residential districts on Hong Kong Island.

After World War II, Happy Valley continued to develop into an upper-class residential area. As more and more wealthy people who originally lived in Caine Road and the Mid-Levels migrated to Happy Valley, rows of three-storey houses began to appear on both sides of Broom Road.

== Features ==
=== Bus services ===
China Motor Bus (CMB) Route 1 was diverted to call at Broom Road via Green Lane on September 16, 1954. In early 1962, CMB relocated the terminus of Route 1 to Broom Road, naming it "Happy Valley (Broom Road) Bus Terminus"; the original bus terminus at the junction of Blue Pool Road next to Happy Valley Racecourse was renamed to "Happy Valley Bus Terminus".

Following Citybus taking over more franchised routes in September 1993 (branded as "Network 26"), the Happy Valley (Broom Road) Bus Terminus was renamed "Happy Valley (Upper) Bus Terminus", whilst the Happy Valley Bus Terminus became "Happy Valley (Lower) Bus Terminus".

Routes 1 and X8 currently call at the Happy Valley (Upper) Terminus on Broom Road.

=== Historic buildings ===
In March 2009, the Antiquities Advisory Board proposed to certify No. 5 and No. 7 Broom Road as Grade III historic buildings. The two art deco semi-detached houses were built between 1939 and 1941.

== See also ==
- List of streets and roads in Hong Kong
