= Amigo (restaurant) =

Coordinates: 22.27185°N 114.18473°E

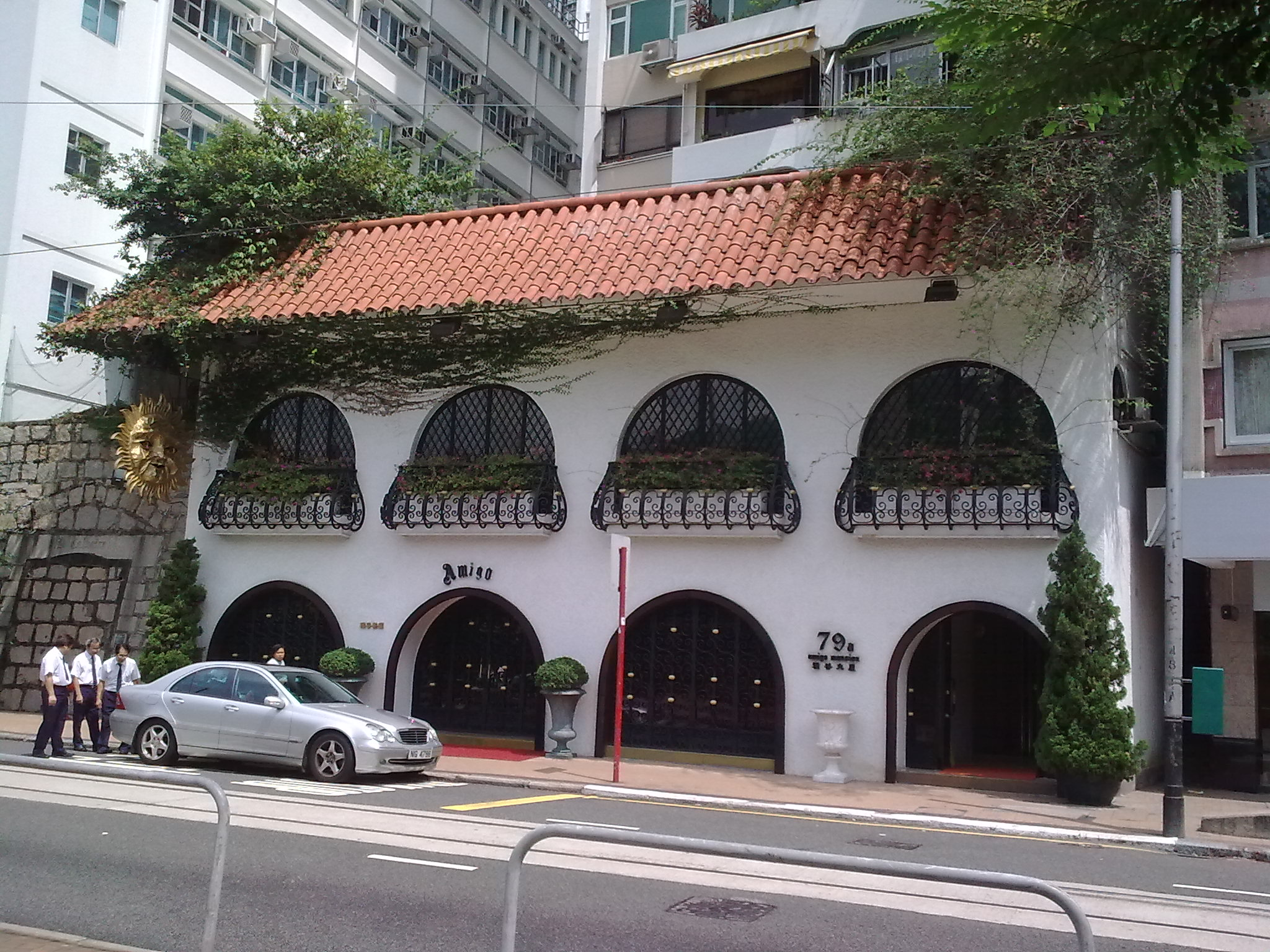
- Amigo Restaurant
- Interactive map of Amigo

Restaurant information
- Owner: Yeung Wing Chung (楊永忠)
- Dress code: Smart Business / formal
- Location: Amigo Mansion, 79A Wong Nai Chung Road, Happy Valley, Hong Kong
- Website: http://www.amigo.com.hk/en/

Amigo (Chinese: 雅谷餐廳) is a French and Western cuisine restaurant in Hong Kong. It was created by owner Yeung Wing Chung (楊永忠) and his staff. Yeung's wife came up with the Spanish name Amigo, meaning "friend". It is located on Wong Nai Chung Road, Happy Valley. Some of their signature dishes include: whole fresh Tasmanian lobster, braised oxtail stew, foie gras, lobster bisque, scallop chowder, fish chowder, bisque d'escargot, roasted rack of lamb, Mongolian raw beef appetiser and warmed salted ox-tongue with mesclun salad, and Napoleon celebration cake and soufflé

== History ==
The first Amigo Restaurant opened in Causeway Bay in the middle of the 1967 riots. It survived that traumatic time and continued to grow within its first year of operation, later purchasing its own premises at Amigo Mansion in Happy Valley on 22-May-1976. The building and the restaurant were designed and built together.

== Decorations ==
There are watercolours by Sir William Russell Flint on the walls. There are also antique sideboards holding Christofle silver and trolleys for carving or making crepes suzettes at the table.

== Owner ==
The restaurant owner Yeung Wing-chung comes from a family whose main business was selling rice. He later branched out into the toy business and hit the jackpot in the 1980s manufacturing Cabbage Patch Kids.
