= St. Margaret's Church, Hong Kong =

Coordinates: 22.2741°N 114.1844°E

St. Margaret's Church
- 聖瑪加利大堂
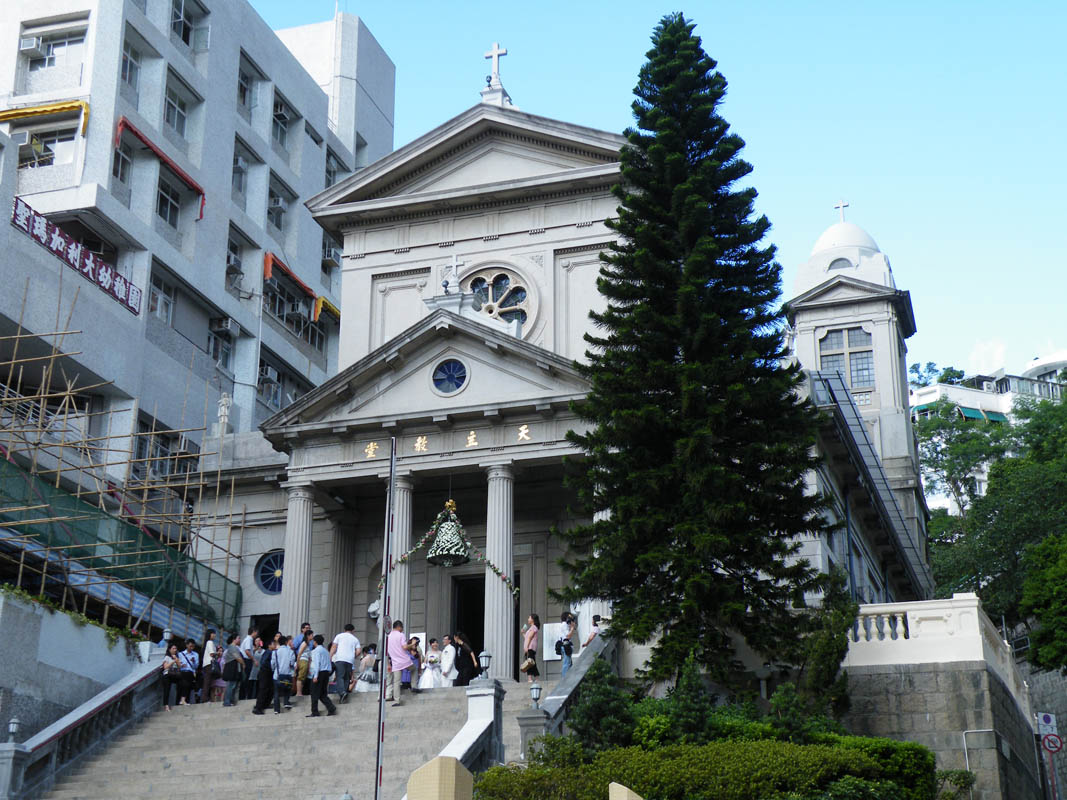
- St. Margaret's Church
- Location: 2A Broadwood Road, Happy Valley, Hong Kong Island, Hong Kong
- Denomination: Roman Catholic
- Website: https://smc.catholic.org.hk/en/

History
- Founded: 3 February 1923: Foundation stone laid 25 January 1925: Consecration and opening 25 January 1949: Elevated to a parish

Architecture
- Functional status: Grade I historic building
- Architectural type: Classical Revival

Administration
- Diocese: Roman Catholic Diocese of Hong Kong

Clergy
- Bishop: Stephen Chow
- Priest: Kim Yong Jae

St. Margaret's Church (Chinese: 聖瑪加利大堂) is a Catholic church in Hong Kong. It is the first church in the Orient to be named after St Margaret Mary Alacoque. It is located at 2A Broadwood Road, Happy Valley, Wan Chai District, Hong Kong Island. It was established by the Pontifical Institute for Foreign Missions. The foundation stone was laid by Rev. De Maria Pietro on February 3, 1923, and was consecrated and opened on January 25, 1925. The church was later upgraded to a parish on January 25, 1949. The church is now listed as a Grade I historic building.

== Architecture ==
The St Margaret's Church was built in 1923. It was designed by Italian architect Gannis in the classical revivalist style. There is a long staircase in front of the door for believers to walk up to the church while looking up at the church. There is a rose window on the facade of the church. The porch is supported by four Doric columns. On both sides of the door are two statues of St Peter and St Paul. The interior adopts the French 18th century structure that combines classical and Gothic styles with columns supporting a round arched ceiling. The barrel vaulted ceiling is filled with relief squares, and the floor plan adopts the style of a Basilica. There is a semicircular sanctuary at the end, with a spiral stone staircase next to it leading directly to the clock tower. There are a large number of stained glass windows on the walls on both sides, with 14 wooden sculptures depicting the process of Jesus' crucifixion to resurrection placed on the two walls. The building was listed as a Grade II historic building in Hong Kong in 1990 and was later upgraded to be a Grade I historic building on December 21, 2010.

== Gallery ==
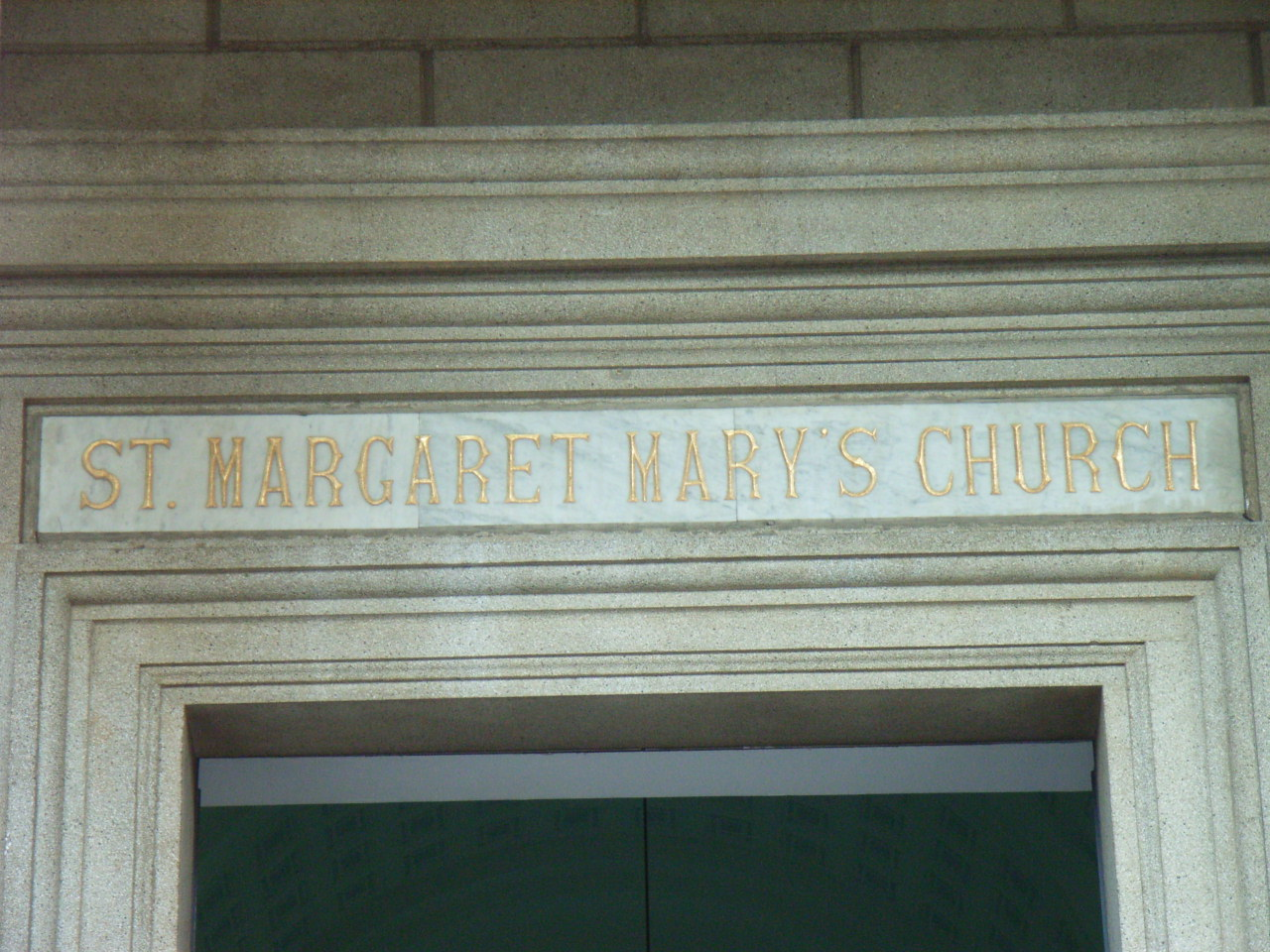
Name of the church on the door arch

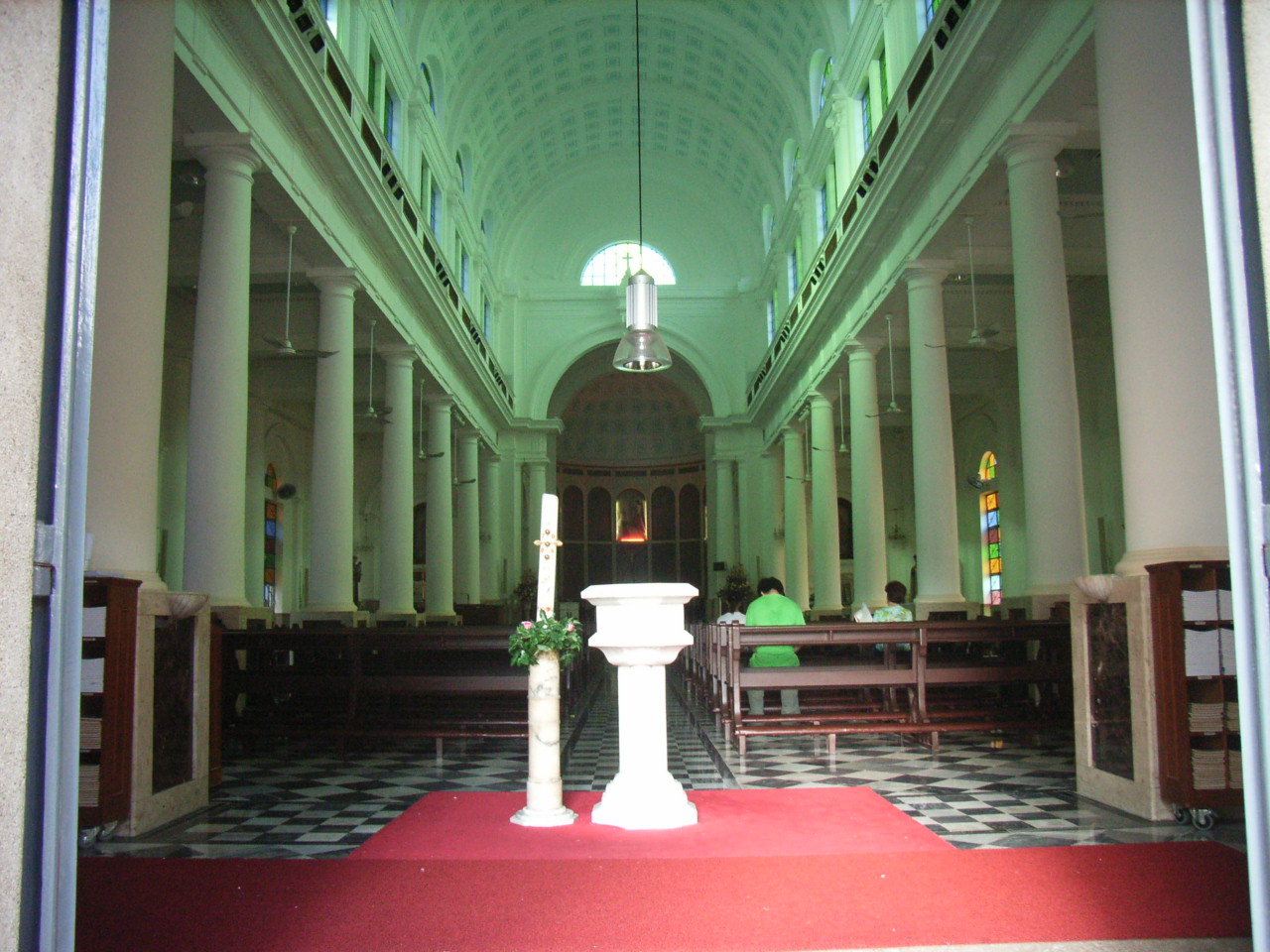
Main hall of the church

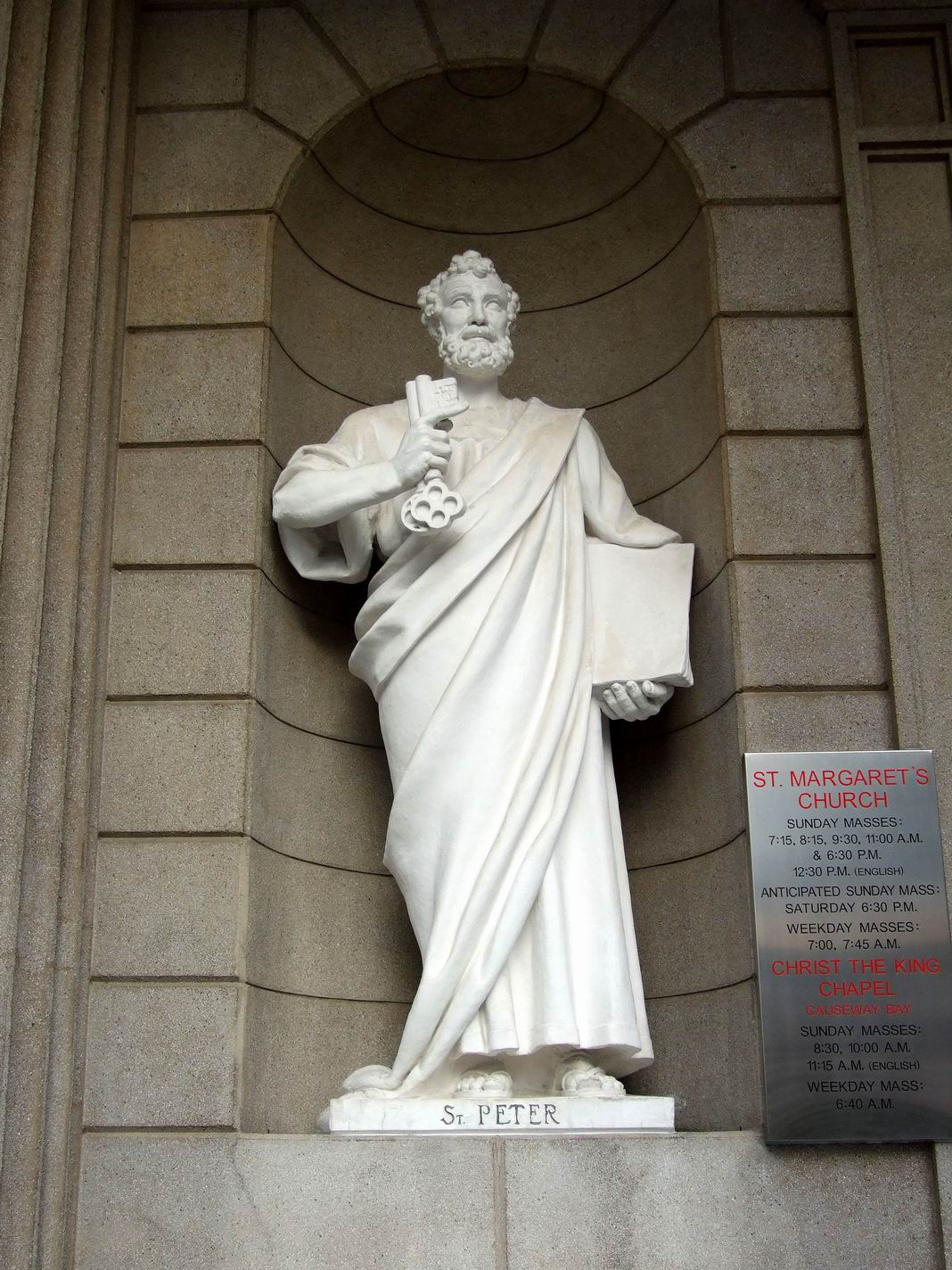
Statue of Saint Peter

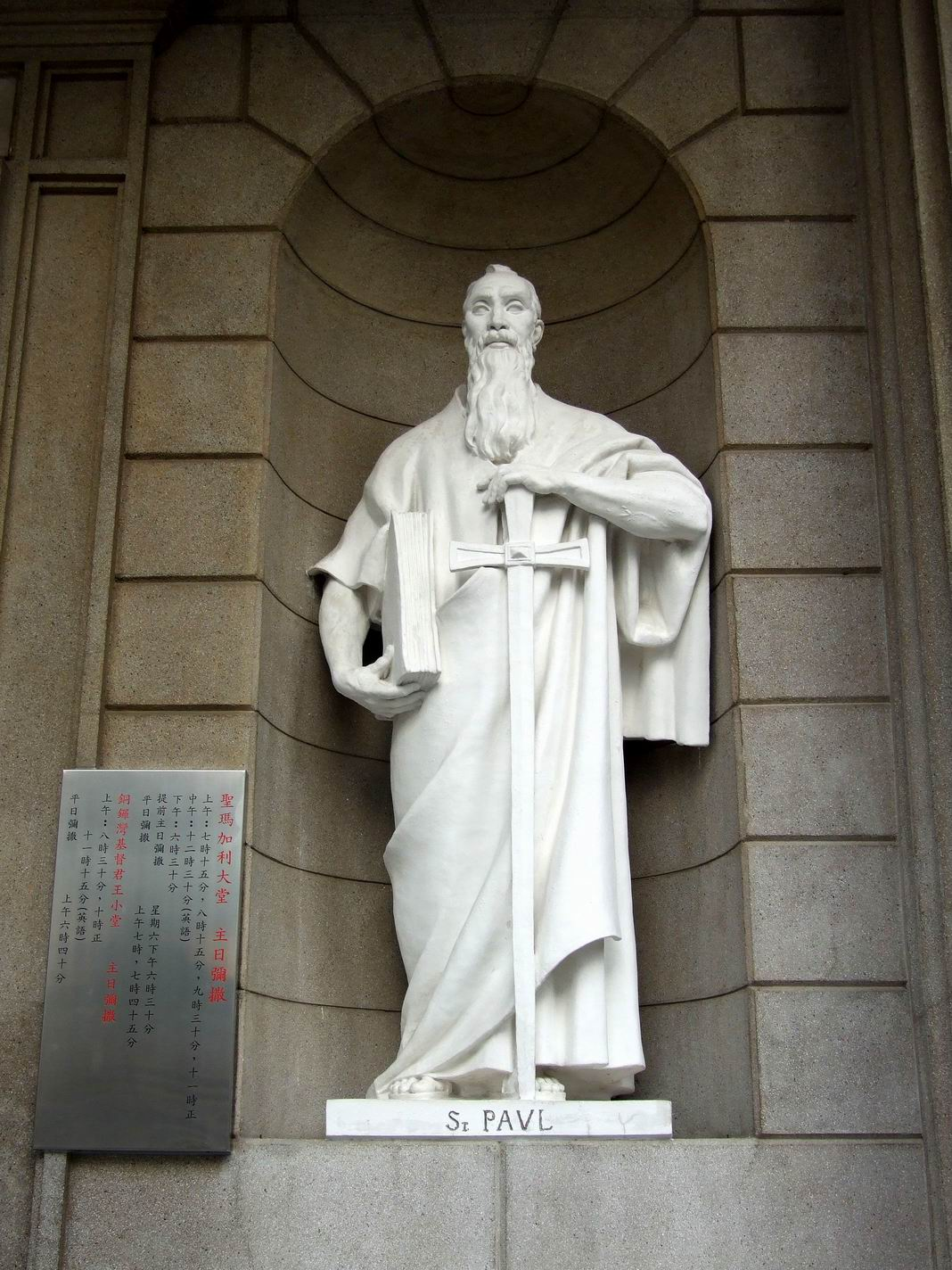
Statue of Saint Paul

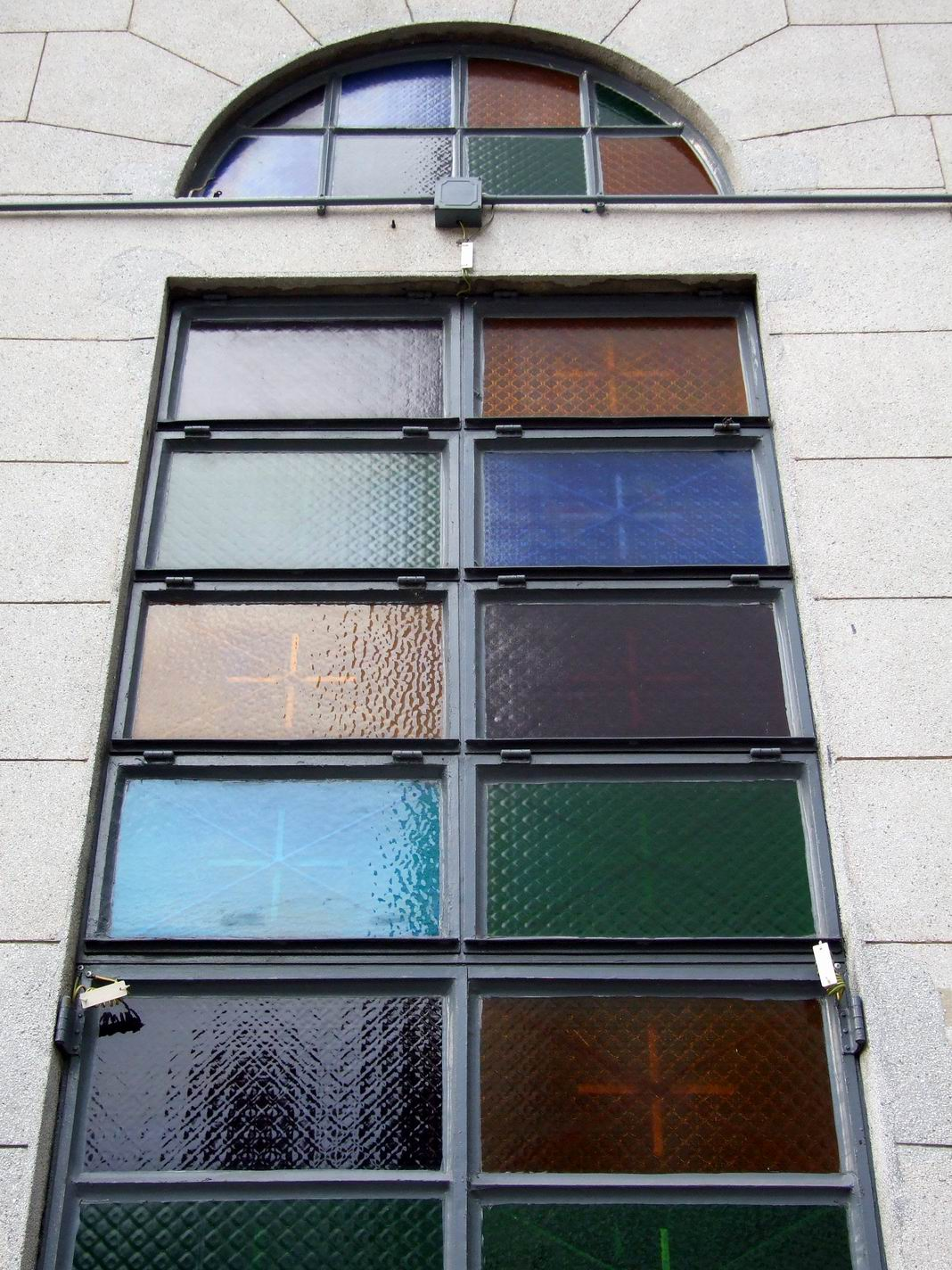
Colourful glass windows

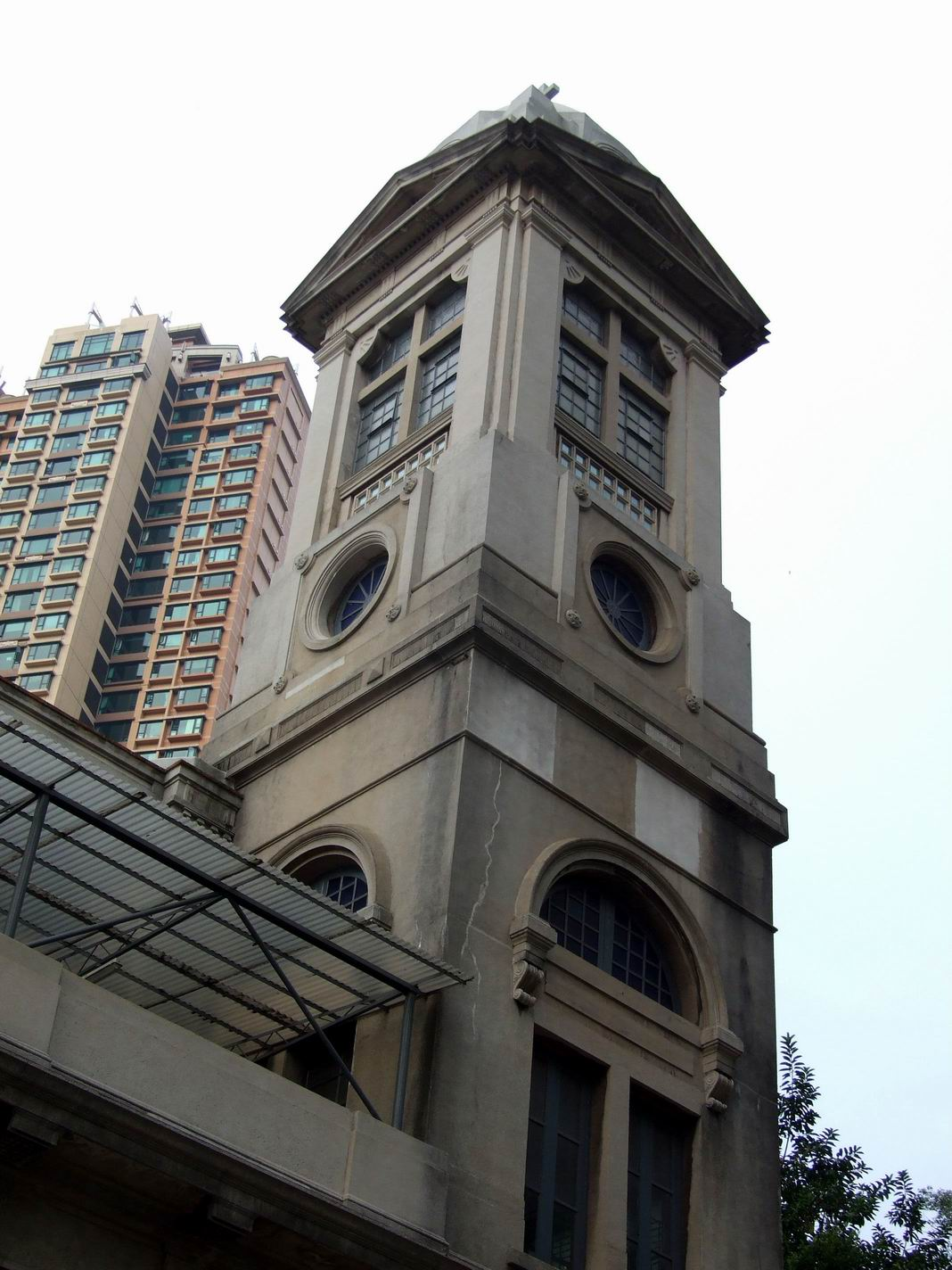
Clock tower

== Pastoral team ==
Post	Name	Appointment date
Parish priest	Rev. Kim Yong Jae Andrew, KMS	15 November 2021
Assistant parish priest	Rev. Joseph M. Everson III, MM	2 November 2022
Assistant parish priest	Rev. Ignatius Lo King Ip	15 August 2025
Assistant parish priest	Rev. Benedict Shum Hin Ho	14 June 2026
Resident priest	Rev. Francis Li Yu Ming	1 October 1995
Deacon	Rev. Deacon Nestor Kwan Chung Wah	1 May 2018
Headmistress of Sunday school	Sr. Maria Celine Phan	1 Aug 2022
