= Wong Nai Chung Road =

Road in Hong Kong

Coordinates: 22.27327°N 114.18391°E

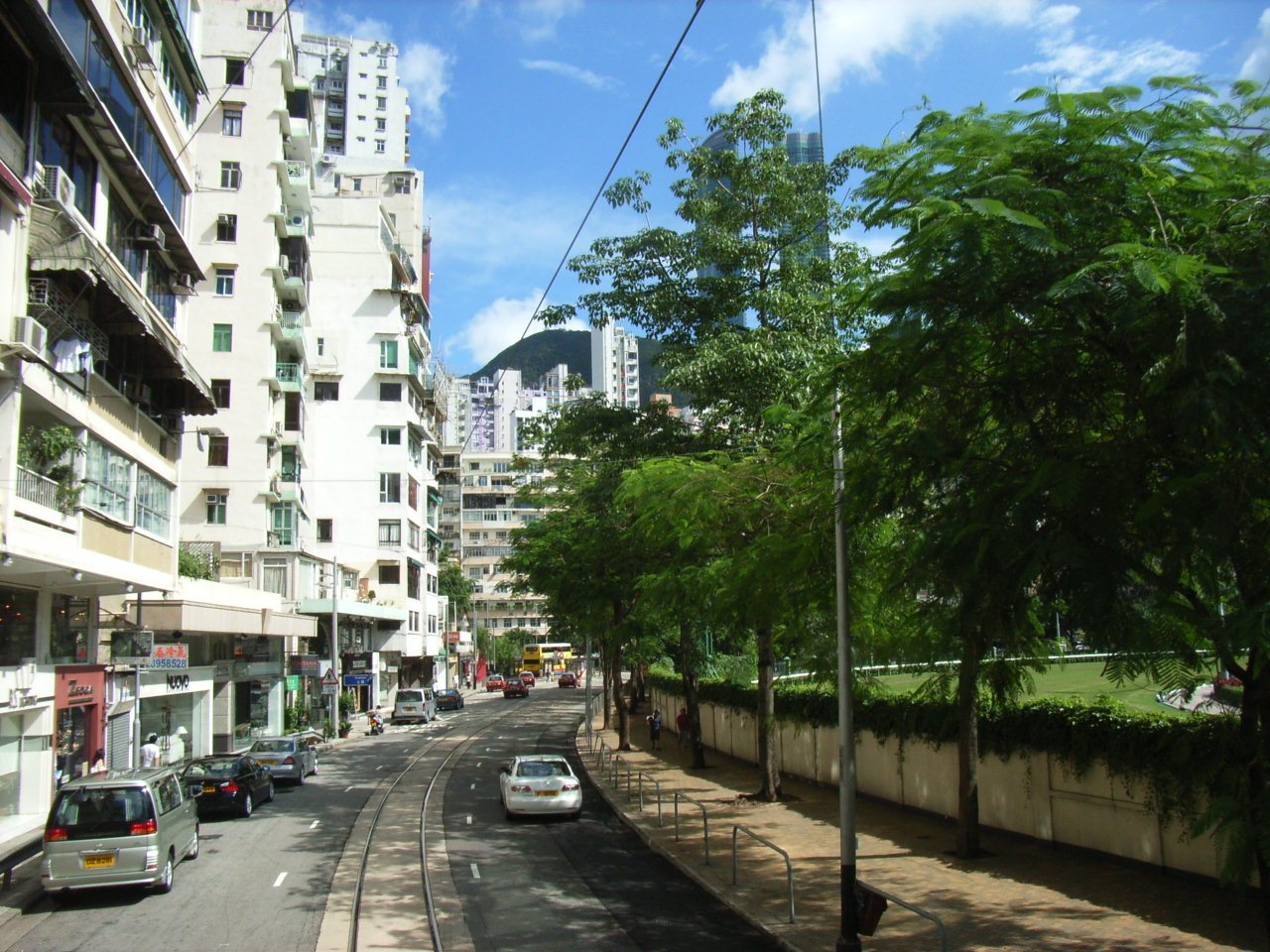
- Wong Nai Chung Road, the next station is HK Tram Happy Valley Station. A portion of Happy Valley Racecourse is visible on the right
- Interactive map of Wong Nai Chung Road
- Native name: 黃泥涌道 (Yue Chinese)
- Length: 1.5 kilometres (0.93 mi)
- Location: Wan Chai, Hong Kong
- East end: Leighton Road / Matherson Street
- West end: Queen's Road East / Morrison Hill Road

Wong Nai Chung Road
- Chinese: 黃泥涌道
- Literal meaning: yellow mud gush road
Transcriptions
Standard Mandarin
- Hanyu Pinyin: Huáng ní yǒng dào
Yue: Cantonese
- Jyutping: wong4 nai4 cung1 dou6

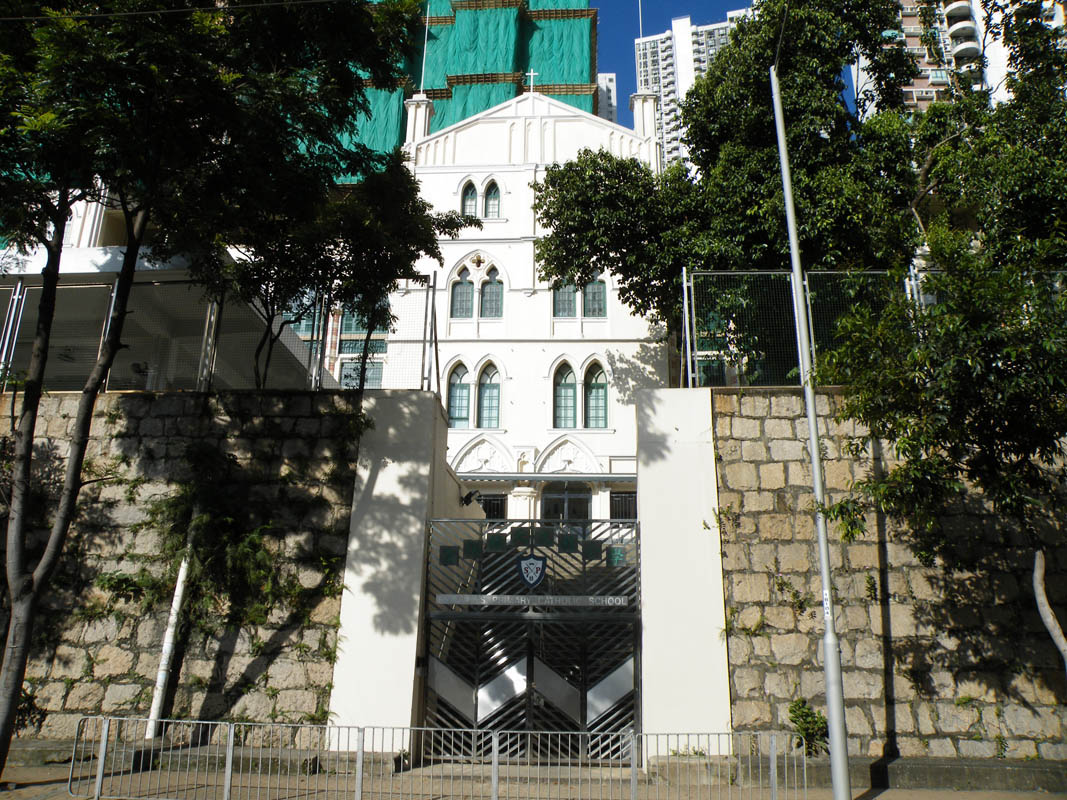
St Paul's Primary Catholic School

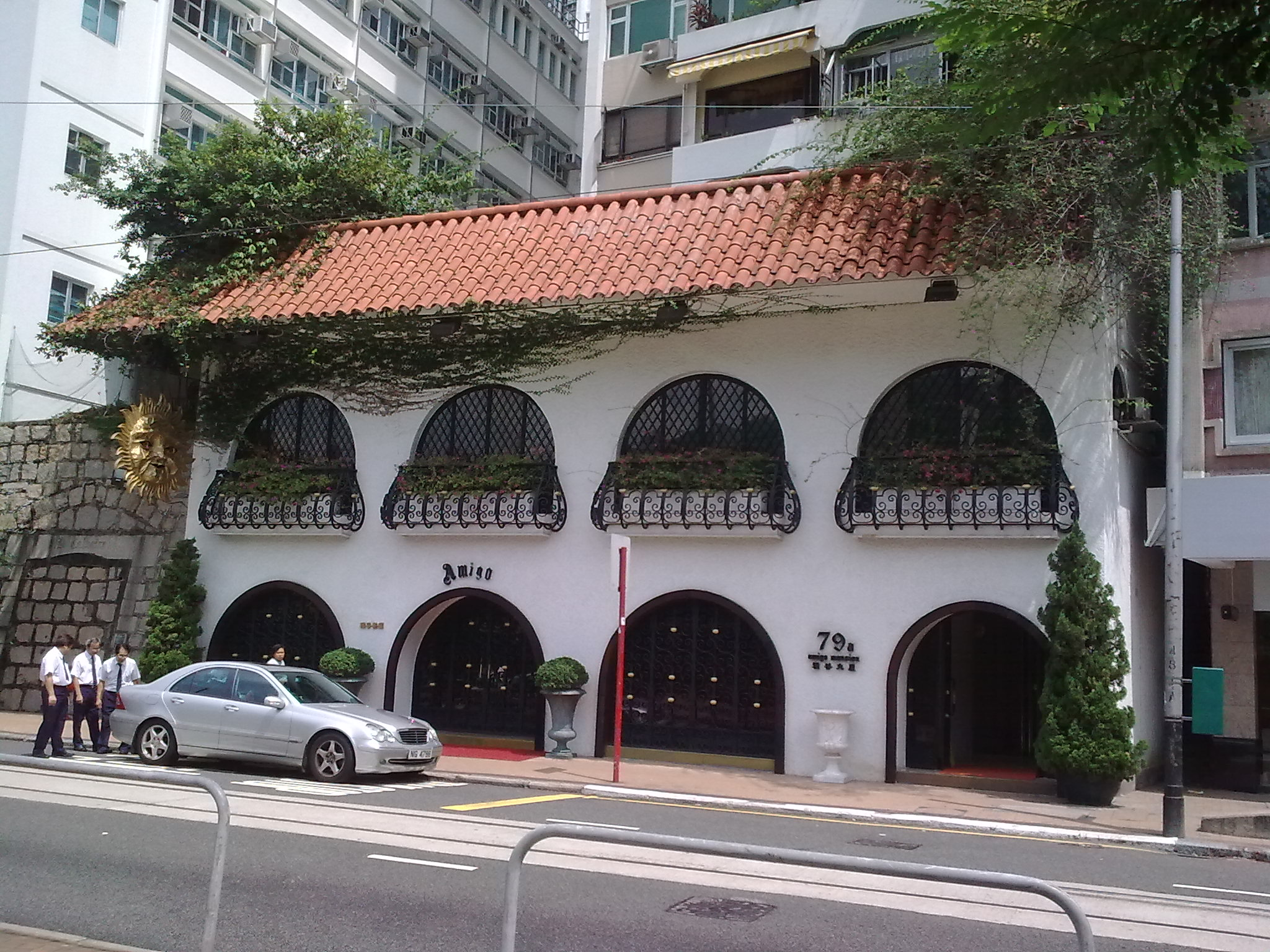
Amigo restaurant

Wong Nai Chung Road is a major road in Happy Valley, Hong Kong. It is a U-shaped road that encircles the southern, western and eastern sides of the Happy Valley Racecourse.

== Location ==
Wong Nai Chung Road starts northeast at the junction with Leighton Road, then turns southward and meets Blue Pool Road at the southern residential area of the valley. It turns westward to Hong Kong Sanatorium & Hospital and then northwest to meet Morrison Hill Road and Queen's Road East and under the Wong Nai Chung Gap Flyover.

The western side of the road on the west of the valley forms part of the eastern limits of the City of Victoria.

== Features ==
- Hong Kong Sanatorium & Hospital
- Amigo restaurant (No. 79A)
- St Paul's Primary Catholic School (聖保祿天主教小學) (No. 81A). The school building was designed by Leigh & Orange and constructed in 1907 for the Roman Catholic Order of the Sisters of St Paul de Chartres. It is listed as a Grade II historic building since 1992.
- Two of the three infield entrances to the Happy Valley Race course, with one just past Sports Road near the Hong Kong Football Club and the other opposite the Happy Valley Tram Stop.

== Transport ==
A circular branch line of Hong Kong Tramways runs along Wong Nai Chung Road, serving Happy Valley and the Happy Valley Racecourse. The Happy Valley Terminus is at the southernmost point of the road. The Tram runs on Wong Tai Chung Road in the section between Leighton Road station and Morrison Hill Road station.

== Intersecting streets ==
Roads are listed from the East end to the West end.

- Leighton Road and Matheson Street
- Sports Road
- Broadwood Road
- Blue Pool Road
- Sing Woo Road
- Shan Kwong Road
- Aberdeen Tunnel -- connected by Roadbridge above
- Hau Tak Lane
- Queen's Road East
- Morrison Hill Road
- Sports Road
- Leighton Road and Canal Road

An elevated Roadbridge, confusingly named Wong Nai Chung Gap Flyover, exists to link the Northern end of the Aberdeen Tunnel to the Canal Road Flyover.

== See also ==
- List of streets and roads in Hong Kong
