= Blue Pool Road =

Road in Hong Kong

Coordinates: 22.268109°N 114.187689°E

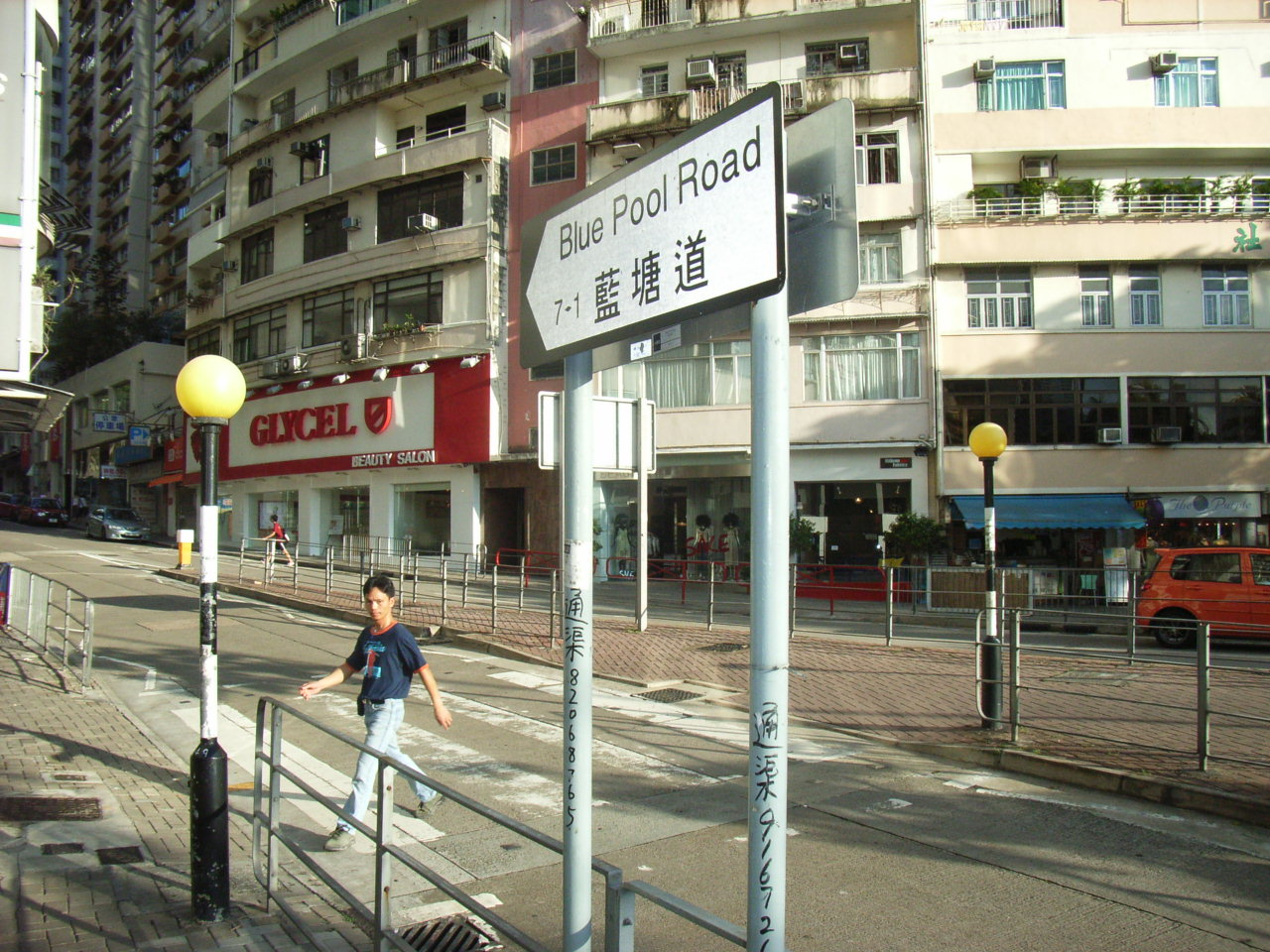
- Lower section of Blue Pool Road, near its intersection with Wong Nai Chung Road in July 2006.
- Interactive map of Blue Pool Road
- Native name: 藍塘道 (Yue Chinese)
- Length: 1.5 km (0.93 mi)

Blue Pool Road
- Traditional Chinese: 藍塘道
- Simplified Chinese: 蓝塘道
Transcriptions
Standard Mandarin
- Hanyu Pinyin: Lántáng Dào
Yue: Cantonese
- Yale Romanization: laam4 tong4 dou6

Antique cast iron street nameplate

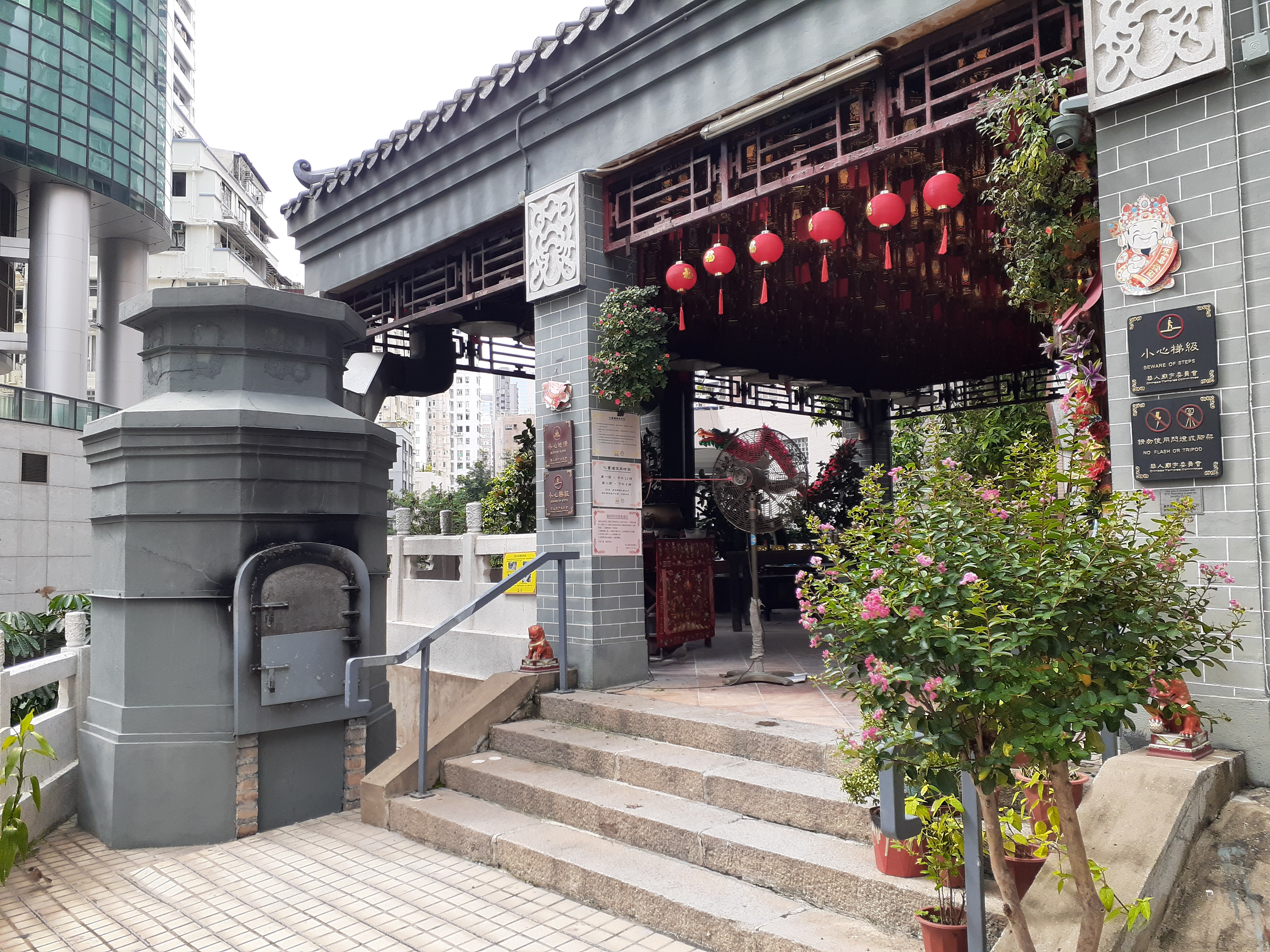
Tam Kung Temple at No.9 Blue Pool Road in July 2020.

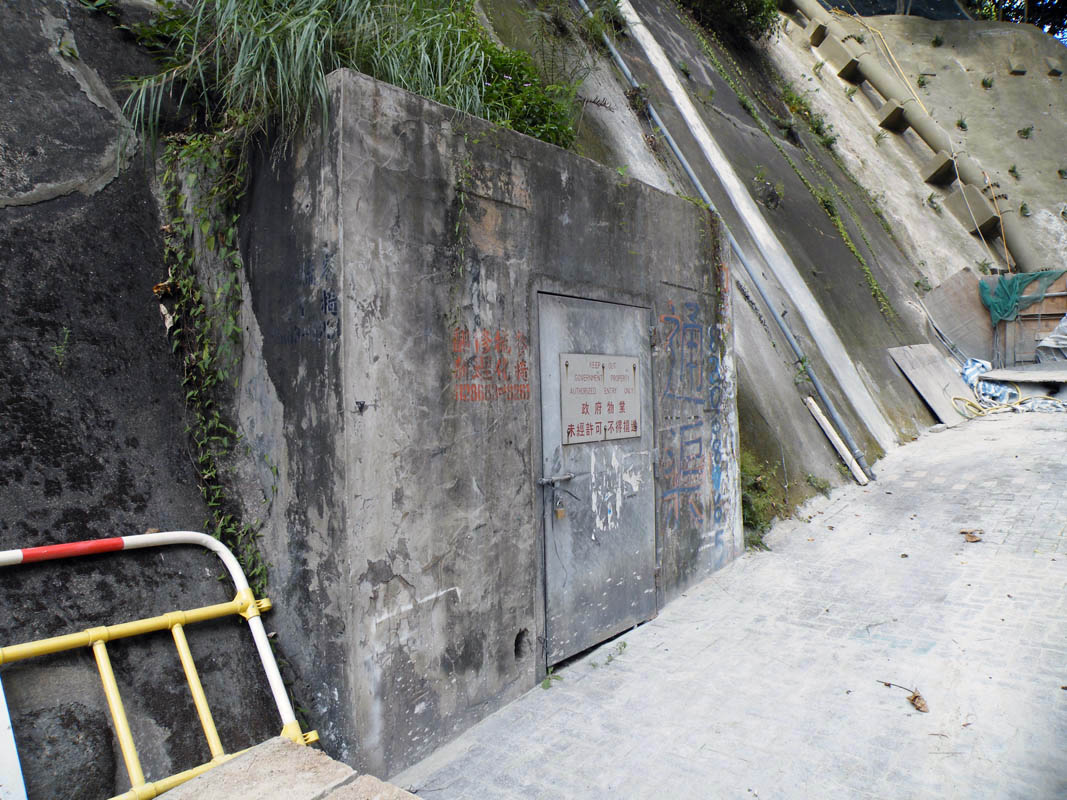
Former entrance of an air-raid shelter, opposite No. 42 Blue Pool Road in August 2010.

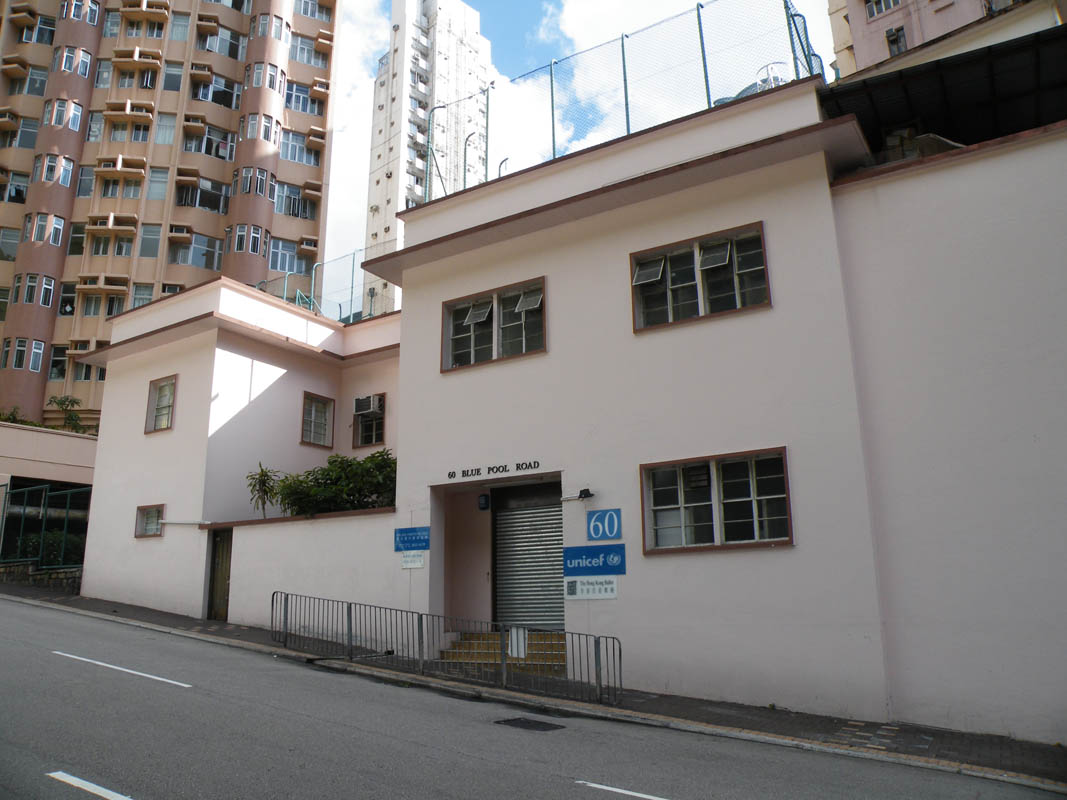
Building at No.60 Blue Pool Road, housing the UNICEF Hong Kong head office in August 2010.

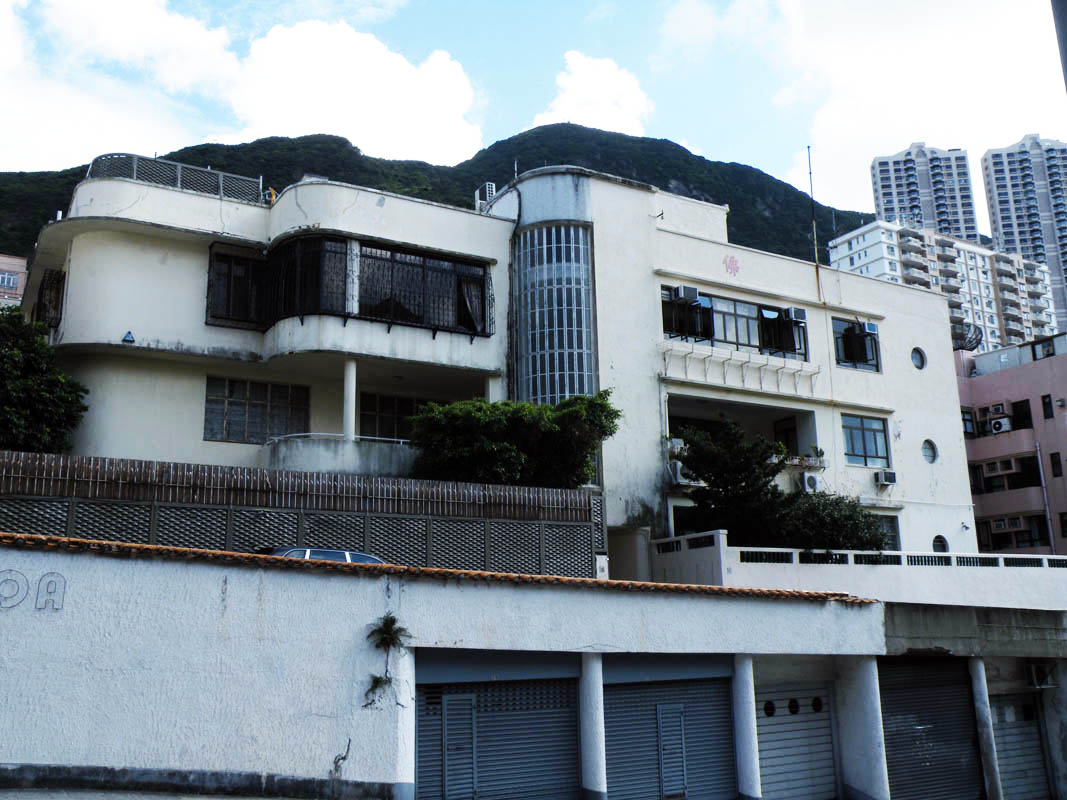
No. 118 and 120 Blue Pool Road in August 2010

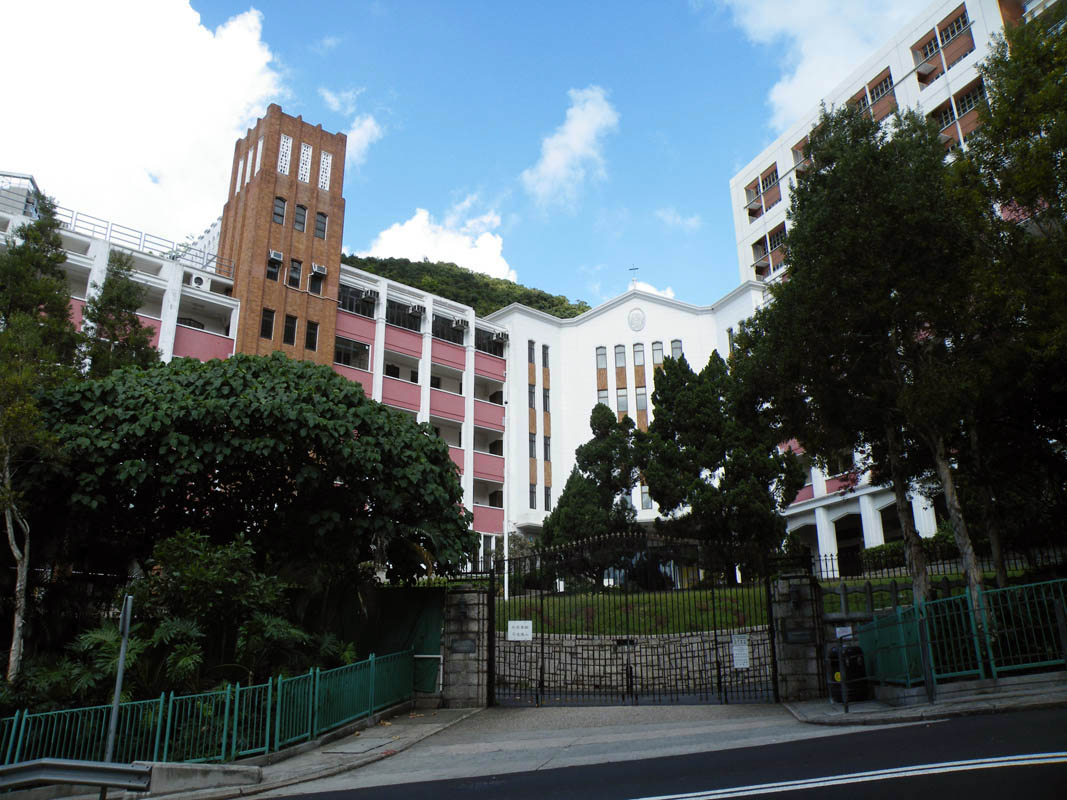
Entrance of Marymount Secondary School at No. 123 Blue Pool Road in August 2010.

Blue Pool Road (Chinese: 藍塘道; Jyutping: laam4 tong4 dou6) is a road linking Happy Valley with Wong Nai Chung Gap on Hong Kong Island.

== Location ==
Blue Pool Road is divided into two sections. The first and longest section starts at Wong Nai Chung Road, opposite the southeastern part of Happy Valley Racecourse, and continues uphill to a mini-roundabout at Tai Hang Road. The second section is a short cul-de-sac located southeast of Tai Hang Road which leads to (and terminates at) the Lycée Français International Victor Segalen.

== History ==
The road was originally the site of Wong Nai Chung Village (黃泥涌村), which had been settled by the Ngs (吳) and Yips (葉), both of whom were Hakka clans from the Mainland, prior to the British colonisation of Hong Kong Island. It was located part-way up the slope that Blue Pool Road follows today, and below today's Village Road. Wong Nai Chung Village was replaced with residential buildings in the 1920s, as a consequence of urban development.

The street is named after the former "Blue Pool" – a natural feature near the former Wong Nai Chung Village, in which people bathed prior to the outbreak of World War I. The pool was fed by the Wong Nai Chung river, whose waters flowed into Victoria Harbour.

During the Battle of Hong Kong, troops of the Hong Kong Volunteer Defence Corps took part in the battle for Wong Nai Chung Gap between 18 and 20 December 1941, and held several strategic positions, including Blue Pool Road. On 22 December 1941, a massacre of Chinese civilians by Japanese troops occurred at Blue Pool Road. An estimated 30 civilians were killed in the massacre.

The entrance to an air-raid shelter from this period is located opposite No. 42 Blue Pool Road.

== Features ==
Blue Pool Road has several steep slopes. It is mainly lined with residential apartments, although there are a number of shops and the odd boutique hotel along the road. The second section of the road is occupied almost exclusively by schools.

A list of notable buildings on both sections of the road follows in the lists below.

First section

- No. 9: a temple complex occupies a small hill at junction of Blue Pool Road with Ventris Road. The complex contains a temple dedicated to Tam Kung, and another dedicated to Tin Hau. The Tam Kung Temple was built in 1901 after the previous one – located on a slope near the Hong Kong Sanatorium and Hospital in the former Wong Nai Chung Village – was demolished during urban development. According to legend, Tam Kung appeared to a young boy in a dream, and guided him to the present site on Blue Pool Road which the deity had selected as the new location of the temple. The Tin Hau Temple, (also rebuilt in 1901) is situated at the rear of the Tam Kung Temple. Both temples have been managed by the Chinese Temples Committee since 1929.
- No. 60 is split between the UNICEF Hong Kong head office and the administrative office of the Hong Kong Ballet.
- Nos.118 and 120: two semi-detached houses which form a single building. The plot was acquired in 1937 by Eu Tong-sen (余東旋), the founder of Eu Yan Sang, who built a number of apartment blocks along Blue Pool Road and Broom Road. The three-storey apartment block was built in the International Modern style of the 1930s. The building was listed as a Grade III historic building in January 2010.
- No. 123: Marymount Secondary School, a Catholic girls' school. The school moved to this location in October 1957.

Second section

- No. 157: Hong Kong Japanese School (primary section). Opened in 1976.
- No. 165: Lycée Français International Victor Segalen (French International School), secondary section

== Transport ==
The lower end of Blue Pool Road is located near the Hong Kong Tramways Happy Valley Terminus. The upper end is served by the following bus routes: 1M, 8X, 19P, A17.

== See also ==
- List of streets and roads in Hong Kong
- Tathong Channel
