= Happy Valley, Hong Kong =

Residential area in Hong Kong

Coordinates: 22°16′N 114°11′E

Happy Valley
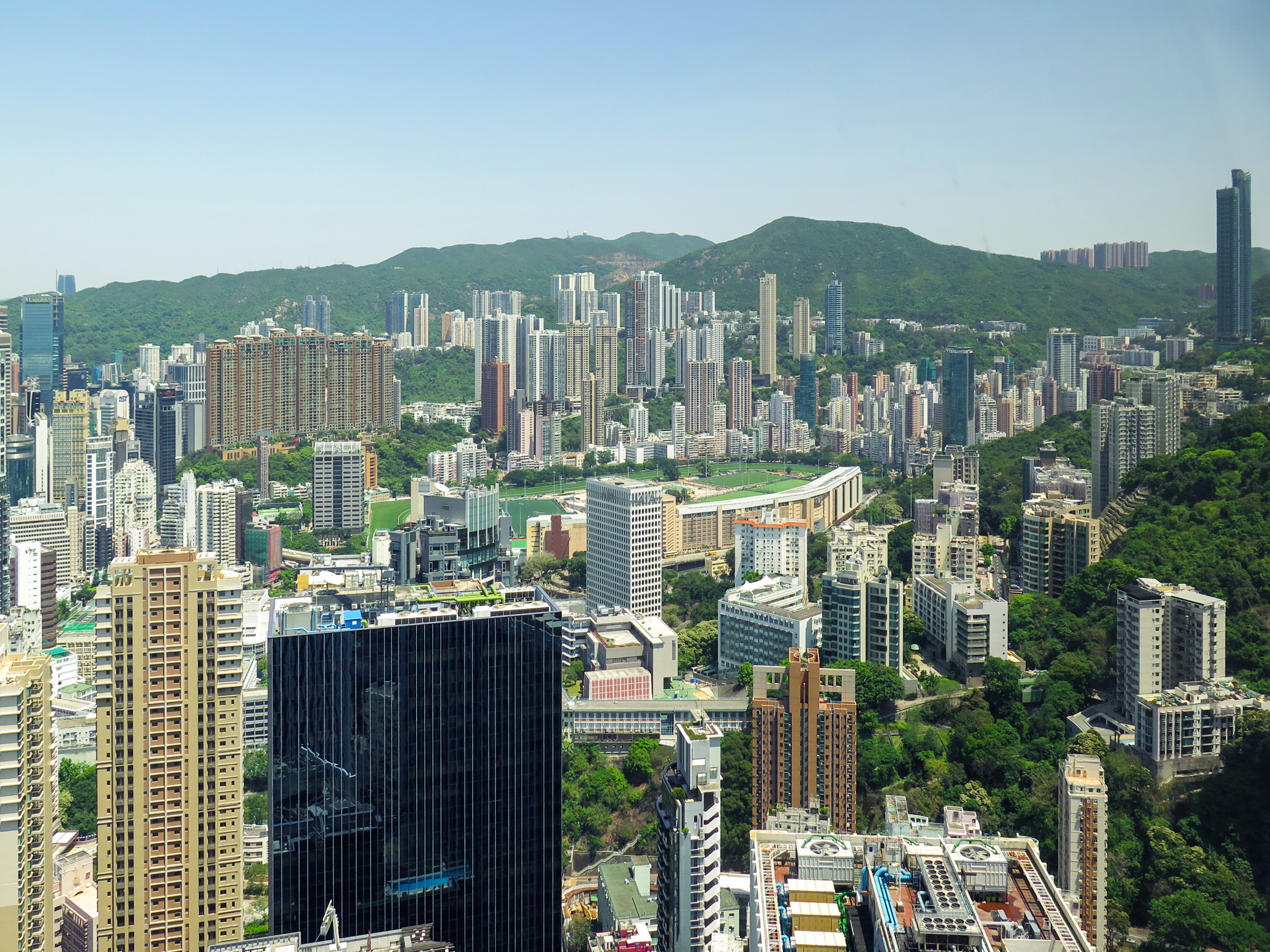
- Traditional Chinese: 跑馬地
- Simplified Chinese: 跑马地
- Jyutping: Paau^{2} maa^{5} dei^{2}
- Literal meaning: horse-racing ground
Transcriptions
Standard Mandarin
- Hanyu Pinyin: Pǎomǎdì
- Yale Romanization: Pǎumǎdì
Wu
- Wugniu: bau^{4} mo^{4} di^{6}
- IPA: Shanghainese: [bɔ˩ mo˦ di˩]
Yue: Cantonese
- Yale Romanization: Paaú màh deí
- Jyutping: Paau^{2} maa^{5} dei^{2}
- IPA: [pʰǎːu ma̬ː těi]

Alternative Chinese name
- Chinese: 快活谷
- Jyutping: Faai^{3} wut^{6} guk^{1}
- Literal meaning: Happy Valley
Transcriptions
Standard Mandarin
- Hanyu Pinyin: Kuàihuogǔ
- Yale Romanization: Kwàihwogǔ
Wu
- Wugniu: khua^{5} weq^{8} koq^{1}
- IPA: Shanghainese: [kʰua˧ ɦuəʔ˦ koʔ˨]
Yue: Cantonese
- Yale Romanization: Faai wuht gùk
- Jyutping: Faai^{3} wut^{6} guk^{1}
- IPA: [fāːi wʊ̀t kʊ̂k]

Second alternative Chinese name
- Traditional Chinese: 愉園
- Simplified Chinese: 愉园
- Jyutping: jyu^{6} jyun^{4*}
- Literal meaning: Pleasing Garden
Transcriptions
Standard Mandarin
- Hanyu Pinyin: Yúyuàn
- IPA: [y̌.ɥɛ̂n]
Wu
- Wugniu: yu^{6} yoe^{2}
- IPA: Shanghainese: [ɦy˩ ɦyø˦]
Yue: Cantonese
- Jyutping: jyu^{6} jyun^{4*}
- IPA: [jy˨.jyn˧˥]

Happy Valley (Chinese: 跑馬地) is an upper-income residential area in Hong Kong, located on Hong Kong Island. The area is bordered by Caroline Hill to the east, Jardine's Lookout to the south, Morrison Hill to the west, and Causeway Bay to the north. Administratively, it is part of Wan Chai District.

Happy Valley is considered as an area surrounded by Caroline Hill Road to the east, Tai Hang Road and Stubbs Road to the south, Canal Road Flyover and westbound section of Wong Nai Chung Road to the west, and Leighton Road to the north.

The area is home to the Happy Valley Racecourse, Hong Kong Racing Museum, Hong Kong Jockey Club Happy Valley Clubhouse, Hong Kong Sanatorium & Hospital, Hong Kong Adventist Hospital – Stubbs Road, home to a number of sports clubs including Valley RFC rugby club, Craigengower Cricket Club, Hong Kong FC football club, and a number of cemeteries including the Hong Kong Cemetery.

It has a population of 32,202 people, 70.7% of them being Chinese. Other ethnic minority groups include Filipinos (12.8%) and whites (6.3%).

== History ==
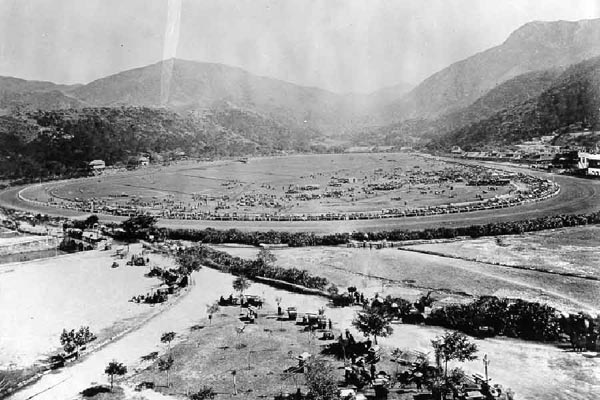
Happy Valley in 1873

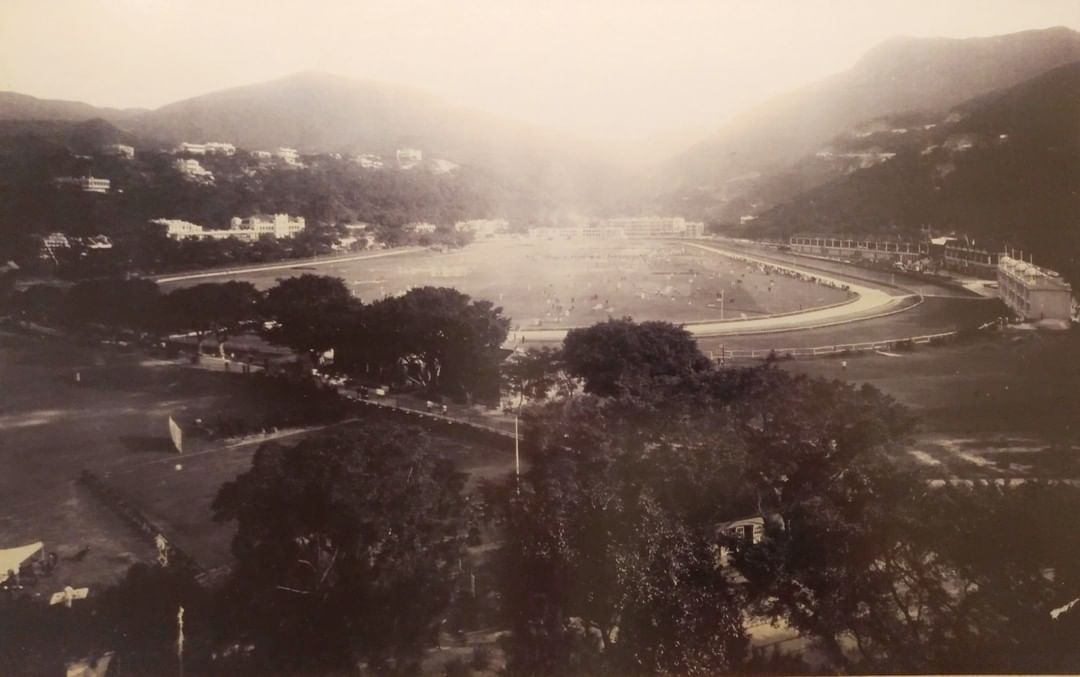
Happy Valley in 1920

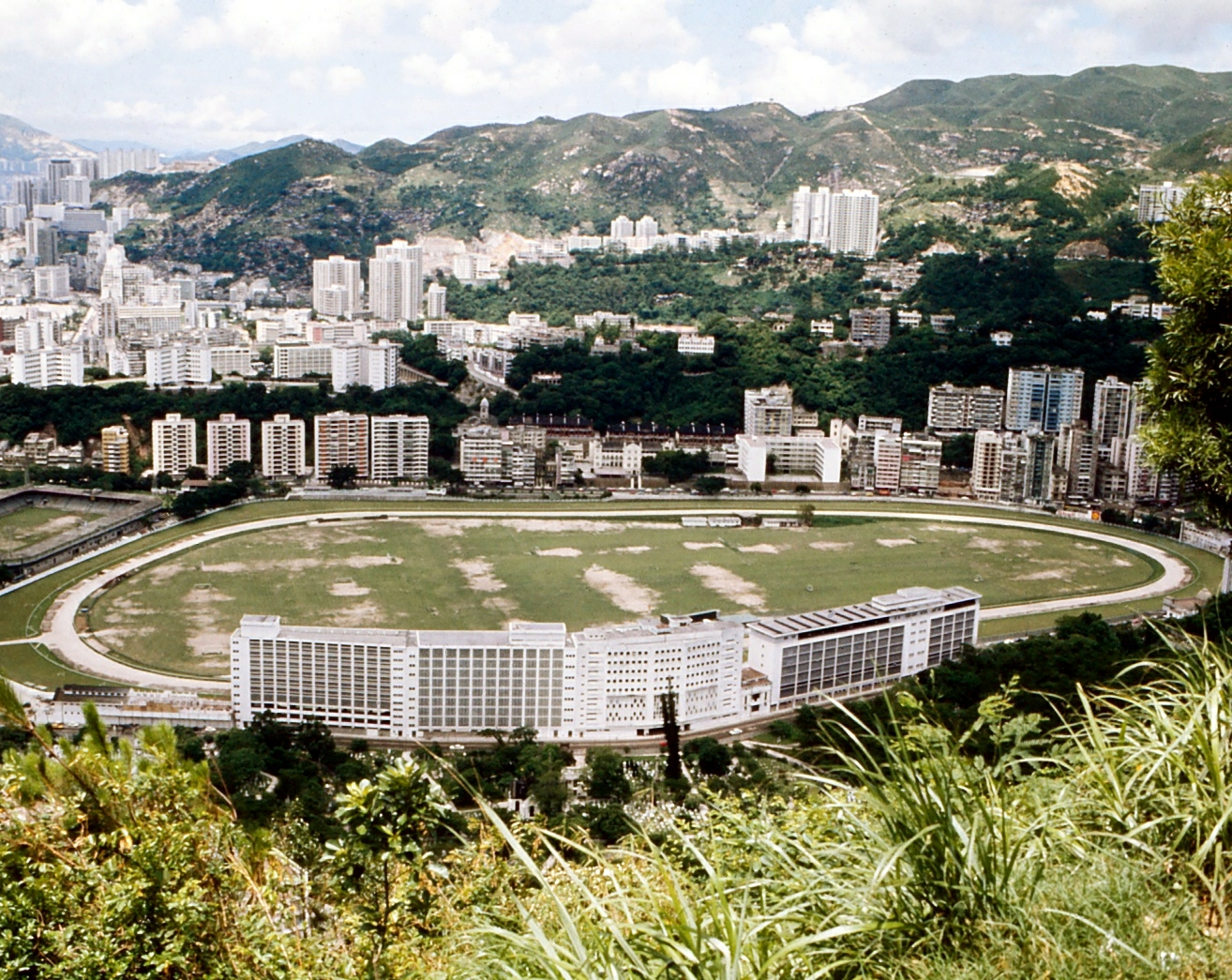
Happy Valley in 1971

The area now known as Happy Valley was formerly known as Wong Nai Chung Valley, sometimes known as Wong Nai Chung Kuk (黃泥涌谷) or Wong Nai Chung Valley because of the Wong Nai Chung (黃泥涌, lit. yellow mud stream) that leads into the area, where the Wong Nai Chung referred to is a mud-filled river collecting waters from the Wong Nai Chung Gap and surrounding area. The river nourished the rice paddies until the construction of Happy Valley Racecourse in 1846.

In early 1840, the British Army set a military camp in the area. However, the camp was later closed due to the increasing number of soldiers succumbing to malaria. The cause of malaria was unknown at the time and the soldiers apparently suffered a then-unknown fever. Early settlers had suggested the area to be used as a business centre, but the idea was shelved due to the valley's marshy environment, which was believed to be causing fatal diseases. The death rate in the area and Victoria City was high in the early colonial days, and the valley became a burial ground for the dead. As a result, the valley was renamed Happy Valley, a common euphemism for cemeteries. In 1846, the British felt that the valley terrain was ideal for horse-racing, and thus cleared the paddy fields and developed the Happy Valley Racecourse. For this, the Wong Nai Chung river was redirected to the Bowrington Canal, known as Ngo Keng Kan (鵝頸澗) locally, concurrent with the reclamation of Wan Chai. The canal is now covered by Canal Road.

On 26 February 1918, the Happy Valley Racecourse fire claimed at least 590 lives. By the next day, as many as 576 confirmed deaths were reported by the Hong Kong Telegraph. It was caused by the collapse of a temporary grandstand, which knocked over food stalls and set bamboo matting ablaze. Most of the dead bodies became unrecognizable and assumed to be "Chinese". They were buried in the nearby So Kon Po area (now the site of Hong Kong Stadium). A Chinese-styled memorial site known as "Race Course Fire Memorial" was built in the Chinese cemetery (now behind the east stand of the stadium).

In 1922, the Hong Kong Sanatorium and Hospital located in Happy Valley started operation.

On 19 December 1941, the Japanese Imperial Army entered the hill east of the valley and fought their way to Blue Pool Road. On (now Blue Pool Road) a number of large massacres occurred, most notably the Blue Pool Road Massacre, where civilians were bayoneted. Civilians and soldiers captured were kept in the appalling conditions of 'the black hole of Hong Kong' (a house on Blue Pool Road). The Japanese later advanced up to Wong Nai Chung Gap, where the battle of Wong Nai Chung Gap occurred, resulting in Japanese control of the gap. Although the low-areas of Happy Valley were captured, areas surrounding Leighton Hill and Morrison Hill were still contested until later in the Battle of Hong Kong.

The Hong Kong Jockey Club (HKJC) resumed horse racing in 1947. From the 2010s, the HKJC began promoting Happy Valley as a tourist attraction with "Happy Wednesday" race nights, featuring live music, beer gardens and food stalls attracting around 8,000–12,000 spectators per meeting.

== Characteristics ==
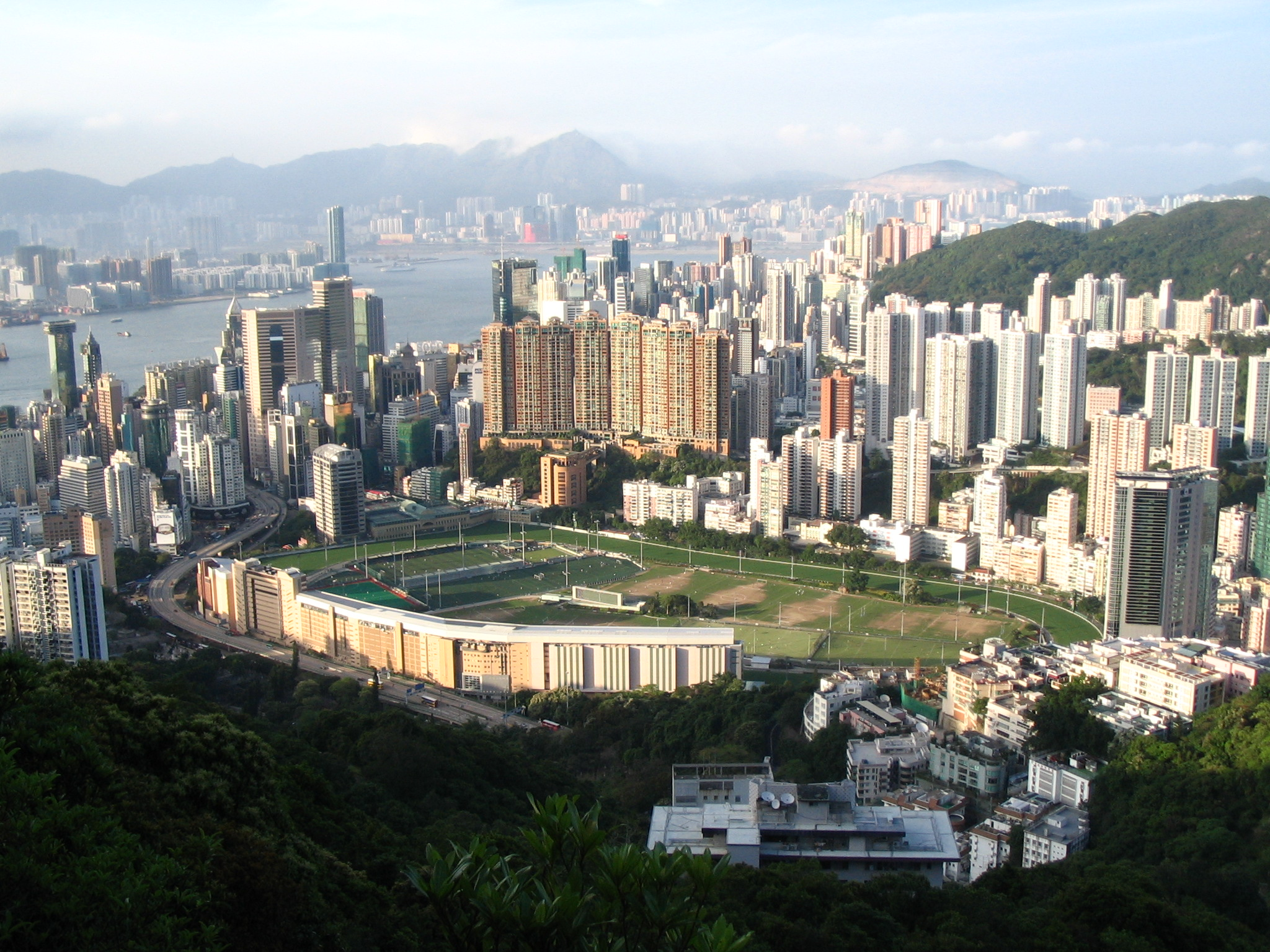
Happy Valley in 2008

Happy Valley is made up of upper-income residential areas. Residents are relatively diverse as to Hong Kong natives and foreigners. Two of the territory's tallest residential buildings, Highcliff and The Summit are specifically in Stubbs Road, facing Mount Nicholson.

Happy Valley hosts six cemeteries, from south to north, the Happy Valley Jewish Cemetery, the Hindu Cemetery, the Parsee Cemetery, Hong Kong Cemetery, St. Michael's Catholic Cemetery, and the Muslim Cemetery.

The Hong Kong Racing Museum and the associated Happy Valley Racecourse, one of the two tracks of the Hong Kong Jockey Club, is in Happy Valley. Whenever a race runs, surrounding traffic patterns have to be changed: cars have to enter Happy Valley and the racecourse via Wong Nai Chung Road in a clockwise fashion, and the road may be heavily congested. The stadium lights in the racecourse illuminate nearby buildings even when the buildings themselves are unlit.

Many other sports are participated and competed in by Hong Kong First Division's Happy Valley Athletic Association.

== Climate ==
Happy Valley is often a hot spot in Hong Kong. On 8 August 2015, Happy Valley recorded a temperature of 37.9 °C (100.2 °F).

== Residential developments ==
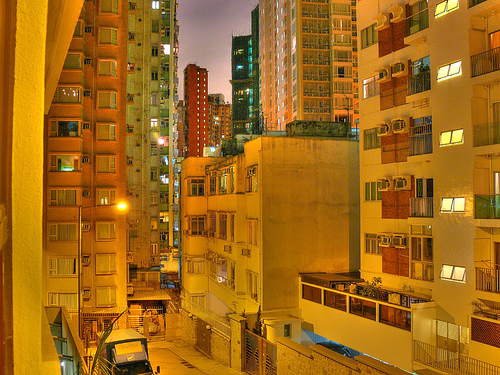
Housing estates

Happy Valley is primarily an upscale residential area.

- Blue Pool Lodge (No. 2, 6 & 10 Blue Pool Road)
- Friendship Court (No. 12-22 Blue Pool Road)
- 23-39 Blue Pool Road (No. 23-39 Blue Pool Road)
- Valley View Terrace (No. 68 Blue Pool Road)
- The Leighton Hill (No. 2A Broadwood Road)
- Broadville (No. 4 Broadwood Road)
- Beverly Hill (No. 6 Broadwood Road)
- Villa Rocha (No. 10 Broadwood Road)
- Villa Lotto (No. 18 Broadwood Road)
- Broadview Villa (No. 20 Broadwood Road)
- Broadwood Park (No. 38 Broadwood Road)
- Caroline Garden (No. 101 Caroline Hill Road)
- Silverwood (No. 109 Caroline Hill Road)
- Celeste Court (No. 10-12 Fung Fai Terrace)
- Felix Villa (No. 10-12A Happy View Terrace)
- Caroline Height (No. 1 Link Road)
- Jade Terrace (No. 3 Link Road)
- Greenway Terrace (No. 5-7 Link Road)
- The Altitude (No. 20 Shan Kwong Road)
- Highcliff (No. 41 Stubbs Road)
- The Summit (No. 41C Stubbs Road)
- The Colonnade (No. 152 Tai Hang Road)
- Winfield Building (No. 1-5 Ventris Road)
- Pioneer Court (No. 17 Ventris Road)
- Ventris Place (No. 19-23B Ventris Road)
- San Francisco Towers (No. 29-35 Ventris Road)
- Panny Court (No. 5 Village Road)
- Village Terrace (No. 35-41 Village Terrace)
- Splendour Court (No. 53 Wong Nai Chung Road)

Several serviced apartments can be found here:

- Eaton Residences (No. 4H Village Road)
- Happy Valley 88 (42 Blue Pool Road)
- The Ellipsis (No. 5-7 Blue Pool Road)
- The Ventris (No. 20 Ventris Road)
- Treasure View (No. 22 Sing Woo Road)
- V Happy Valley (No. 68 Sing Wood Road)
- Eight Kwai Fong (No. 8 Kwai Fong Street)

== Education ==
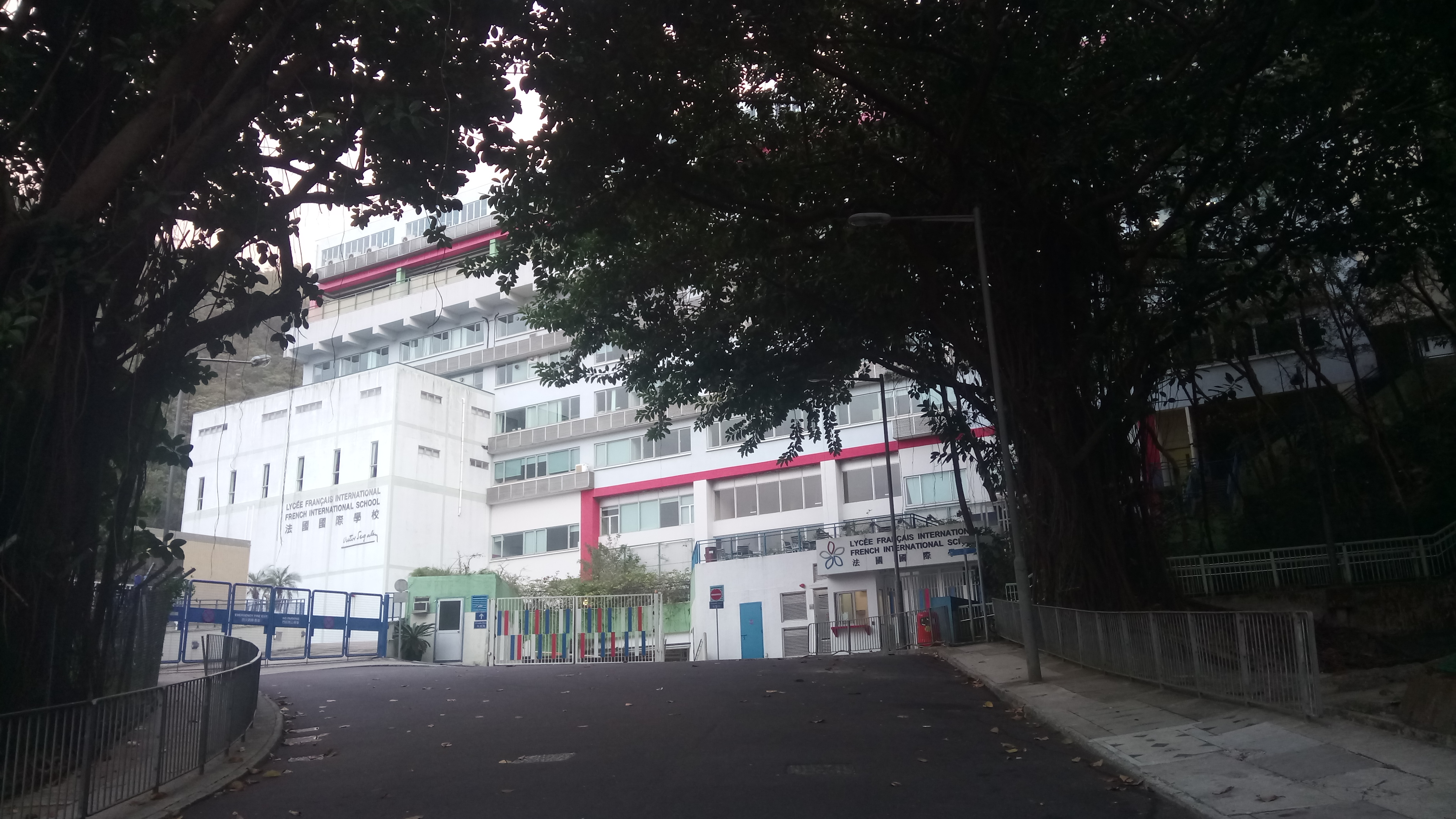
Lycée Français International Victor Segalen Blue Pool Road Campus

Happy Valley is in Primary One Admission (POA) School Net 12. Within the school net are multiple aided schools (operated independently but funded with government money) and the following government schools: Hennessy Road Government Primary School and Sir Ellis Kadoorie (Sookunpo) Primary School.

Happy Valley is home to a number of prestigious institutions, international schools, and special education.

Located on Blue Pool Road, Marymount Secondary School is a prestigious all-girls Roman Catholic Secondary School. The school is academically rigorous and students are known for excellence in open examinations, especially for the English Language. Its affiliated primary school Marymount Primary School is adjacent to the secondary school.

Located on Ventris Road, St. Paul's Secondary School is a prestigious Anglo-Chinese all-girls Roman Catholic secondary school. The school is renowned for its outstanding basketball team. Its affiliated primary school St. Paul's Primary Catholic School is adjacent to the secondary school.

Located on Blue Pool Road, the Lycée Français International Victor Segalen, the French international school, maintains its Blue Pool Road campus, housing the administration and secondary school section, in Happy Valley.

Located on Blue Pool Road, the Hong Kong Japanese School's Happy Valley Campus is in the community. The Happy Valley campus houses the primary education section, and in April 2018 the junior high school section moved there too.

Located on Blue Pool Road, Hong Chi Lions Morninghill School offers special education for children with mild intellectual disabilities.

Hong Kong Public Libraries operates the Wong Nai Chung Public Library in the Wong Nai Chung Municipal Services Building.

== Transport ==
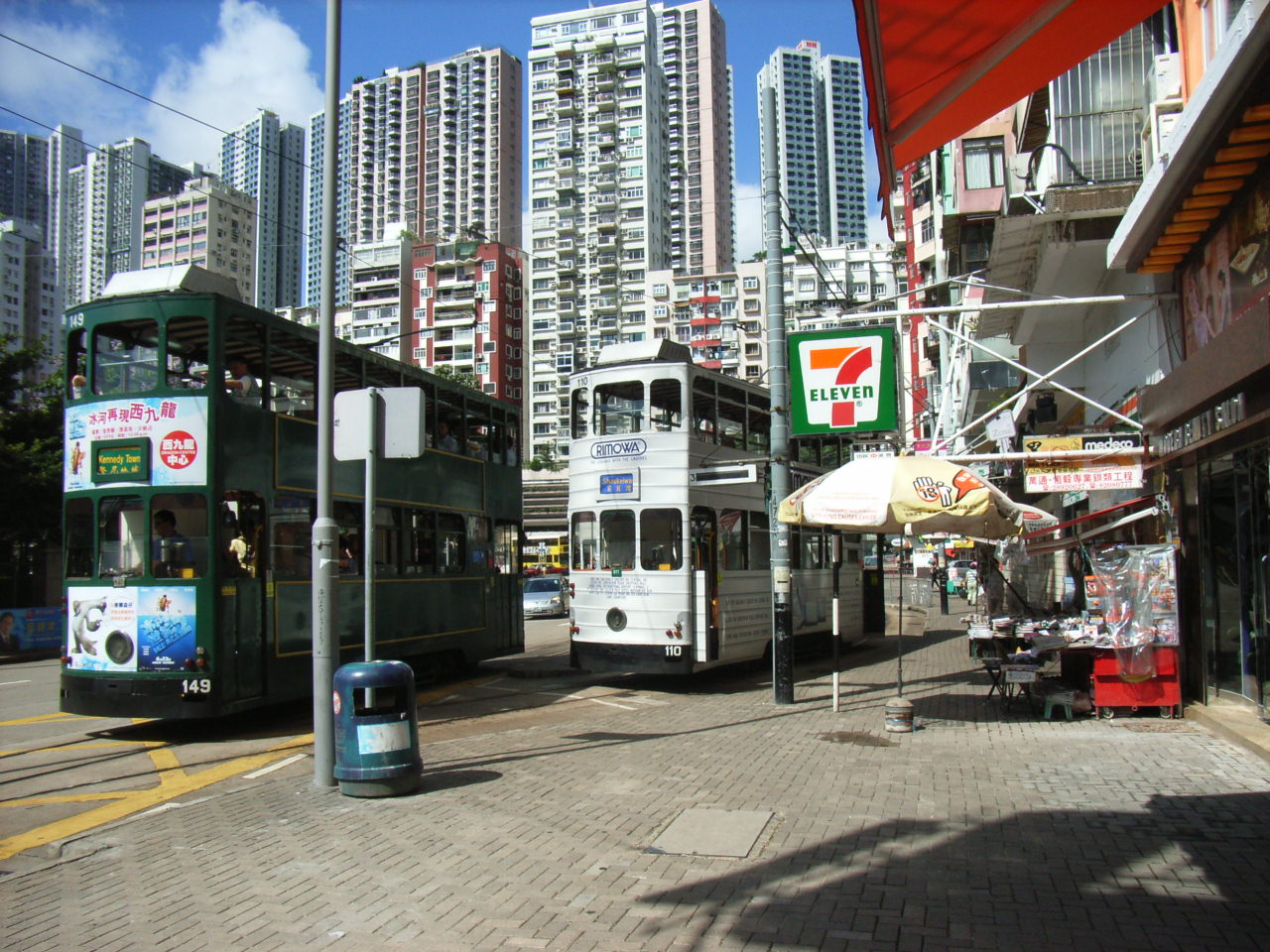
Trams in Happy Valley

Hong Kong Tramways extended their network into Happy Valley in 1922, and the community has been served by the trams ever since. The extension has one terminus.

Residents can access the Causeway Bay MTR station via minibuses or trams.

Aberdeen Tunnel, Wong Nai Chung Road and Canal Road Flyover also serve as the major thoroughfares in Happy Valley.

Happy Valley has three bus terminals, of which two are located above Happy Valley on Tai Hang Road and Stubbs Road and one on Wong Nai Chung Road. The terminus furthest up the hill serves bus route No. 8X that goes to Island Resort, Siu Sai Wan.

The upper terminus (also on the hill) serves one of Hong Kong's oldest bus routes (No. 1) which spans from Green Lane of Happy Valley to Central.

The lower bus terminus serves bus route No. 117, going to Sham Shui Po.

Bus route No. 1M, circulating Exhibition Centre station and Wong Nai Chung Gap, also by way of entire Happy Valley.

== Major thoroughfares, roads and streets ==
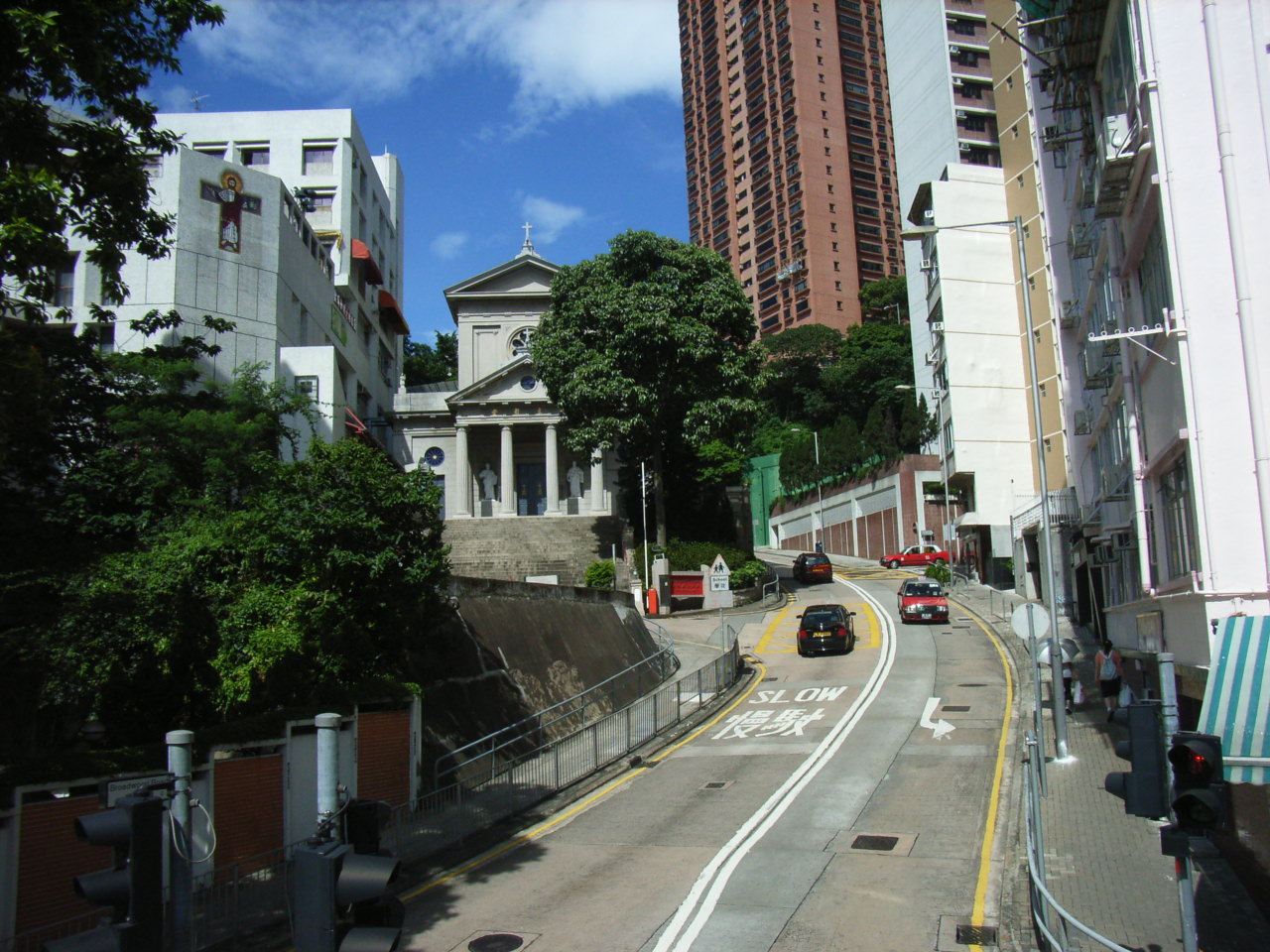
Broadwood Road

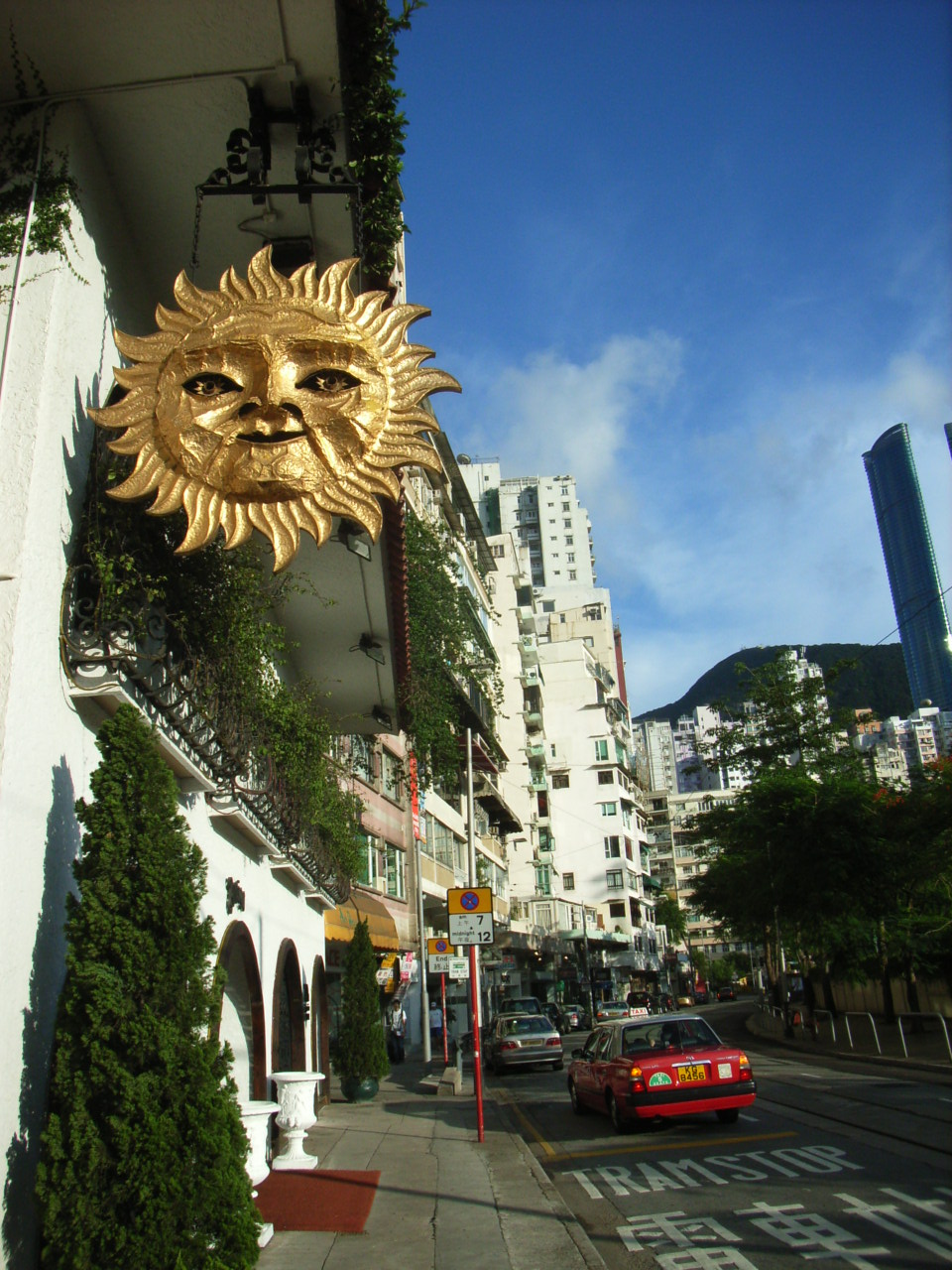
Wong Nai Chung Road outside Amigo Restaurant

- Blue Pool Road
- Briar Avenue
- Broadwood Road
- Broom Road
- Caroline Hill Road
- Fung Fai Terrace
- Green Lane
- Happy View Terrace
- Hawthorn Road
- Holly Road
- King Kwong Street
- Link Road
- Shan Kwong Road
- Sing Woo Crescent
- Sing Woo Road
- Sports Road
- Stubbs Road
- Tai Hang Road
- Ventris Road
- Village Road
- Village Terrace
- Wong Nai Chung Road
- Yik Yam Street
- Yuk Sau Street

== See also ==
- List of places in Hong Kong
