= Repulse Bay (disambiguation) =

Repulse Bay is a bay in Hong Kong.

Repulse Bay may also refer to:

- Repulse Bay Beach in Hong Kong
- Repulse Bay, Nunavut, now called Naujaat
- Repulse Bay to Ince Bay Important Bird Area, a stretch of beach in Central Queensland, Australia
- Repulse Bay, Queensland, see Estuary stingray
- The Repulse Bay, a development in Hong Kong
