= Repulse Bay Beach =

Beach in Hong Kong Island, Hong Kong

- Beach
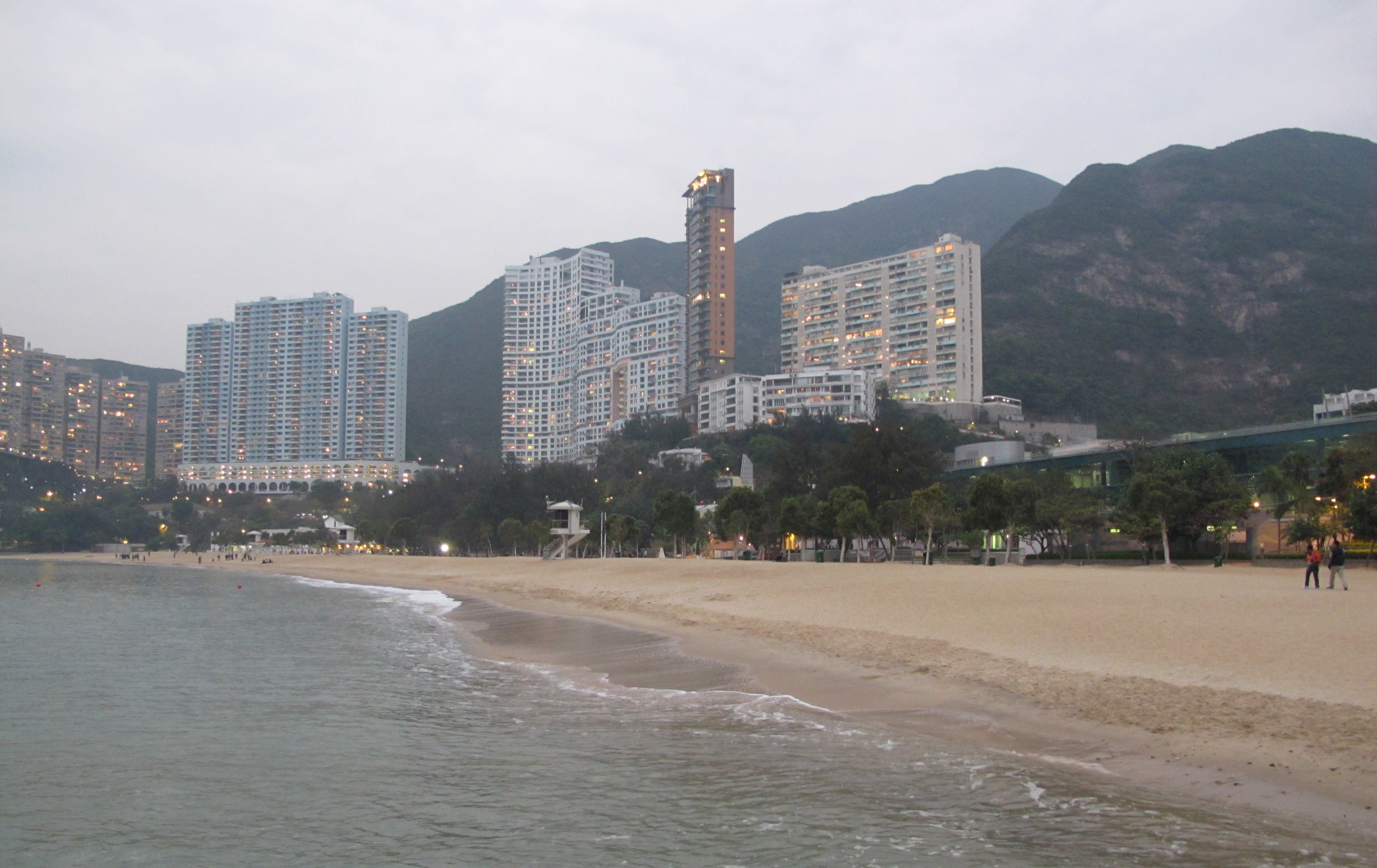
- Repulse Bay Beach

- Location within Hong Kong
- Coordinates: 22.23686°N 114.19614°E
- Location: Repulse Bay, Hong Kong Island

Dimensions
  - Length: 292 m (958 ft)
- Patrolled by: Leisure and Cultural Services Department

Repulse Bay Beach
- Traditional Chinese: 淺水灣泳灘
- Simplified Chinese: 浅水湾泳滩
Transcriptions
Standard Mandarin
- Hanyu Pinyin: Qiǎn Shuǐ Wān Yǒng Tān
Yue: Cantonese
- Jyutping: cin2 seoi2 waan1 wing6 taan1

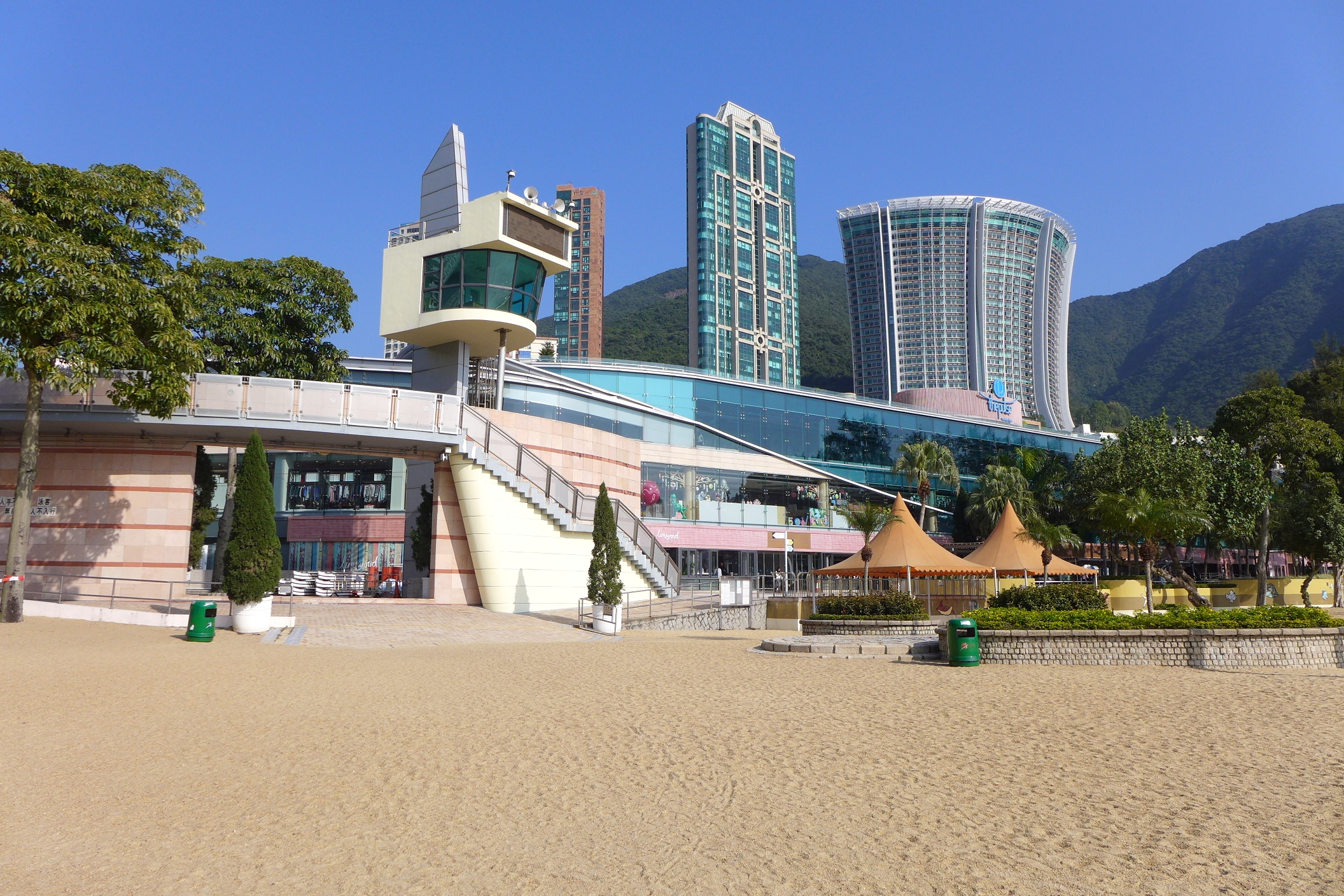
Repulse Bay Beach

Repulse Bay Beach is a gazetted beach located in Repulse Bay, Southern District, Hong Kong. The beach has barbecue pits and is managed by the Leisure and Cultural Services Department of the Hong Kong Government. Rated Grade 1 by the Environmental Protection Department for its water quality, the beach is about 292 metres long with views of Middle Island. There is an adjacent shrine (Kwun Yam Shrine) and shopping centre (The Pulse).

== History ==
On 1 July 1999, Sau-kwan, a 14-year-old schoolboy, drowned while swimming near the beach. He was rescued by lifeguards and was taken by an ambulance to Tang Shiu Kin Hospital where he was pronounced dead.

On 22 June 2004, a 27-year-old man drowned while swimming with friends near the beach. He was rescued by lifeguards and taken to Ruttonjee Hospital, where he was pronounced dead.

== Usage ==
The beach is one of the longest beaches in Hong Kong with a length of 292 metres (958 ft). It is consistently among the most popular beaches in Hong Kong, attracting large tour groups throughout the year.

== Features ==
The beach has the following features:

- BBQ pits (24 nos.)
- Changing rooms
- Showers
- Toilets
- Fast food kiosk
- Restaurant
- Water sports centre
- Playground
- Beach volleyball court

== See also ==
- Beaches of Hong Kong
