= Middle Bay (Hong Kong) =

Bay in Hong Kong

Coordinates: 22°14′N 114°12′E

Middle Bay Beach
- Beach
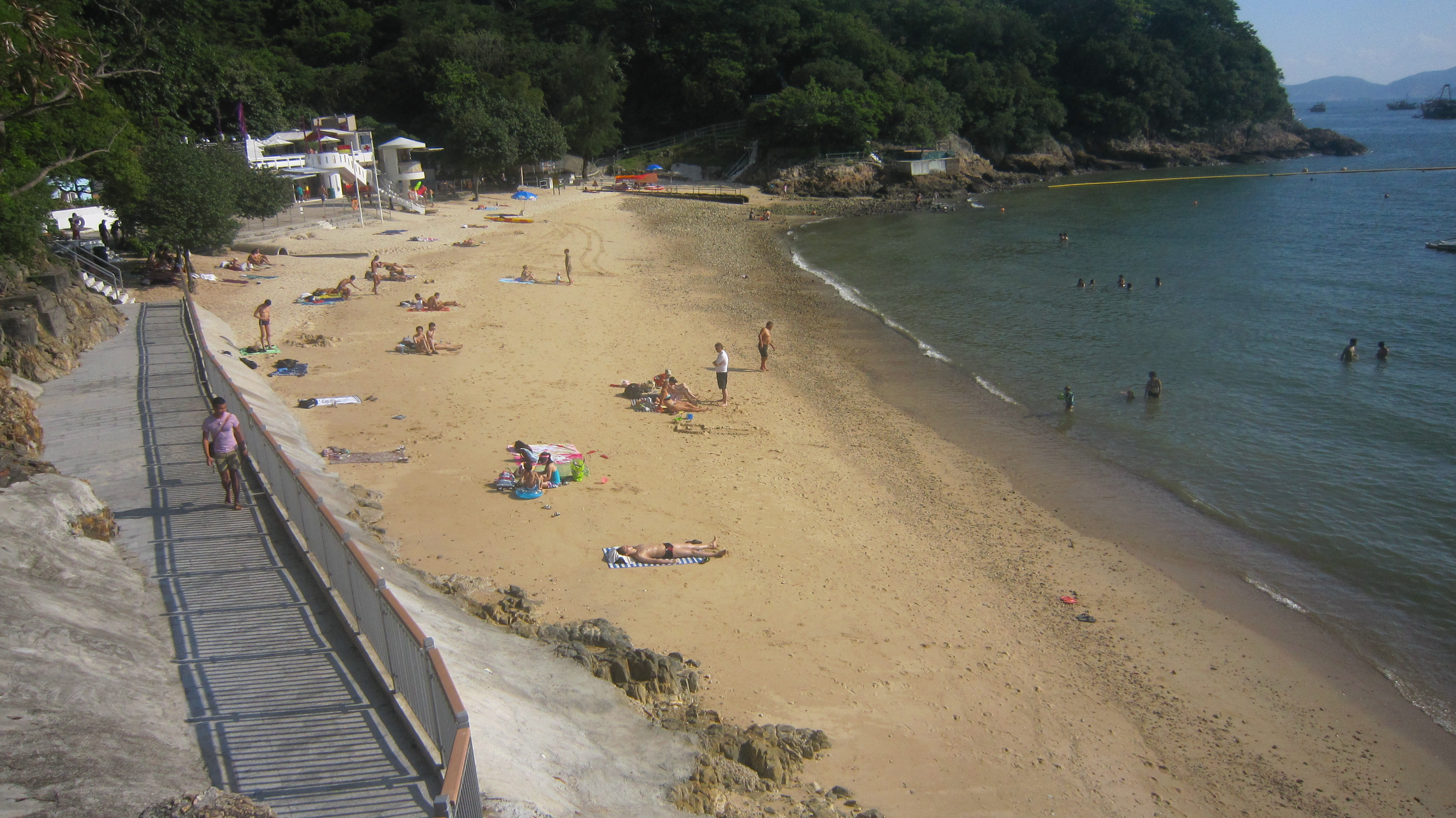
- Overview of beach
- Location: Southern District, Hong Kong

Dimensions
  - Length: 100 m (330 ft)
- Access: South Bay Road

Middle Bay (Chinese: 中灣) is a small bay in Southern District, Hong Kong Island, between Repulse Bay and South Bay. Middle Bay Beach (中灣泳灘) is located there. It is a gazetted beach with lifeguards provided by the Leisure and Cultural Services Department in the daytime during the summer months.

== History ==
The coastline was formerly lined with bathing sheds built by a variety of swimming associations and other groups. The Hong Kong University Alumni Association inaugurated a swimming pavilion at Middle Bay in 1957. In 1962, there were 49 such huts at Middle Bay. These were leased to the public on a yearly basis through balloting.

In the late 1960s, the Urban Council moved to gradually replace bathing sheds with public changing rooms. Some sheds were pulled down in 1969 at Middle Bay and South Bay. A new beach building was completed by the Urban Council in July 1975. The rest of the bathing huts were demolished later.

There was a serious hit-and-run case at the beach at about 4:30 pm on Sunday, 10 July 1983. A red speedboat entered the restricted swimming zone and ran down three young swimmers. The boat did not stop, and sped off in the direction of Deep Water Bay before police arrived. The crime went unsolved. One of the injured swimmers, 24-year-old Alun Chan Hon-wah, had to have his foot and part of his lower leg amputated. The police classified the case as "endangering life at sea", and the marine police and Marine Department increased patrols around beaches in an effort to protect swimmers' safety. The Urban Council installed new alarm systems and loud hailers at beaches.

== Facilities ==
- BBQ pits (9 nos.)
- Changing rooms and showers
- Raft
- Toilets
- Tuck shop

== See also ==
- Beaches of Hong Kong
