= T-V-H =

Submarine telecommunications cable system

T-V-H (Thailand-Vietnam-Hong Kong) is a submarine telecommunications cable system in the South China Sea linking Thailand, Vietnam and Hong Kong.

It has landing points in:

- Si Racha, Chonburi Province, Thailand
- Vũng Tàu, Bà Rịa–Vũng Tàu province, Vietnam
- Deep Water Bay, Southern District, Hong Kong

It has a transmission capacity of 565 Mbit/s and a total cable length of 3,367 kilometres (2,092 mi). It started operation on 8 February 1996.

== Service disruptions ==
On 25 March 2007, the cable network was broken due to local pirates who cut the cable to sell for scrap metals. It was estimated that the link would take three months to repair.
