= HMS Tern (1927) =

Gunboat of the Royal Navy

History

United Kingdom
- Name: HMS Tern (T64)
- Ordered: 14 January 1926
- Builder: Yarrow & Co., Glasgow
- Launched: 29 August 1927
- Commissioned: November 1927
- Fate: Scuttled 19 December 1941

General characteristics
- Type: River gunboat
- Displacement: 262 long tons (266 t)
- Length: 168 ft (51 m)o/a
- Beam: 27 ft (8.2 m)
- Draught: 4 ft 3 in (1.30 m)
- Installed power: 1,370 shp (1,020 kW); 2 × Yarrow boilers
- Propulsion: 2-shaft geared turbines
- Speed: 14 knots (26 km/h; 16 mph)
- Complement: 55
- Armament: 2 × QF 3-inch (76 mm) 20 cwt anti-aircraft guns; 8 × .303-inch Lewis guns

HMS Tern was a river gunboat built for the Royal Navy by Yarrow in 1927.

== Design ==
Tern and her sister ship HMS Seamew were river gunboats ordered under the Royal Navy 1926 Estimates, and were sometimes referred to as Tern-class river gunboats. They sported two masts and were propelled by twin-screw propellers with geared steam turbines, giving them a top speed of 14 knots (26 km/h; 16 mph). The ships were protected by bulletproof plating to the bridges along with gun shields. They were introduced with HMS Peterel and HMS Gannet as modern vessels for use in China. The four vessels were sometimes grouped in the same class, despite Tern and Seamew having a smaller and shorter design than the latter two vessels.

== Service ==
Tern was constructed by Yarrow in Scotstoun in 1927, with the yard number 1528. After her construction, she was broken down into sections and transported to Hong Kong, where she was reassembled and launched. After her reconstruction she served in the Yangtze.

In 1941, she was transferred back to Hong Kong. In December, she took part in the Battle of Hong Kong. On 11 December, she assisted in the evacuation of British forces from Kowloon to Hong Kong Island. On 12 or 13 December, she shot down a Japanese aircraft. She was scuttled in Deep Water Bay on 19 December, to prevent capture by the Japanese.
