= The Pulse (shopping mall) =

Shopping arcade in Repulse Bay, Hong Kong

Coordinates: 22.2352°N 114.1984°E

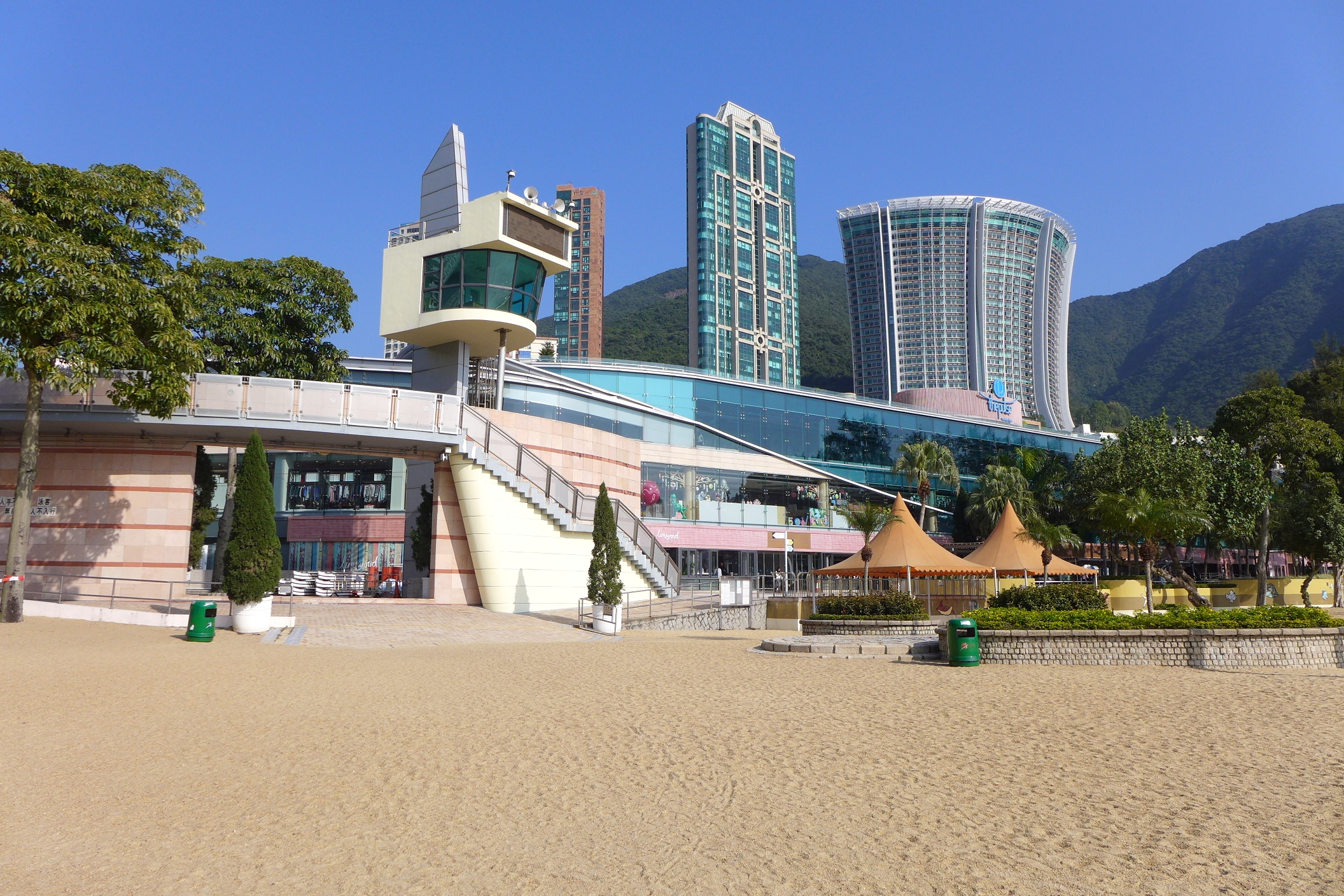
- Location: 28 Beach Road, Repulse Bay, Hong Kong
- Opened: November 2014
- Developer: Emperor International Holdings Limited
- Owner: Emperor International Holdings Limited
- Floor area: 167,000 sq.ft.
- Floors: 6
- Website: Official Website

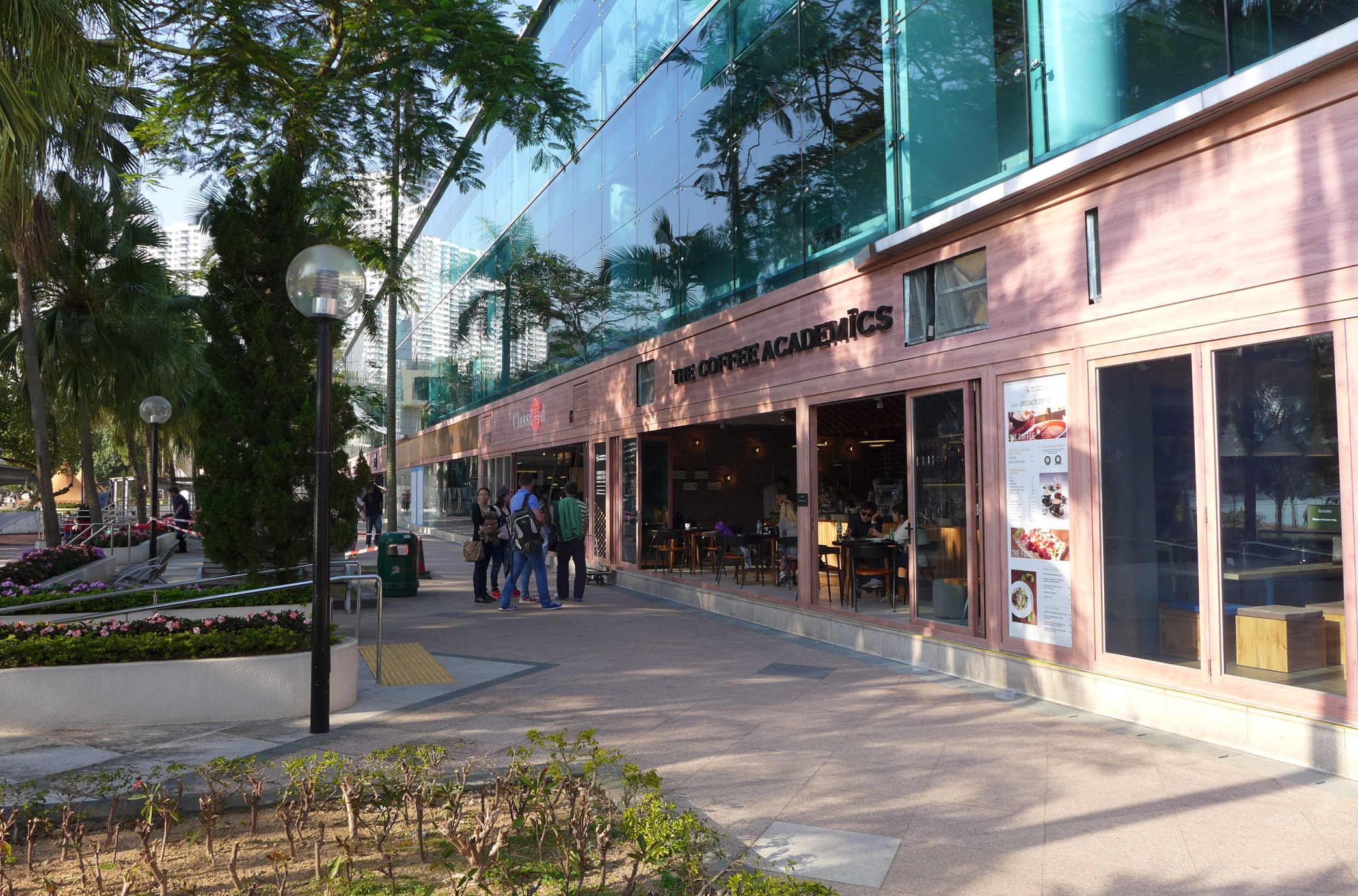
Restaurants at L1

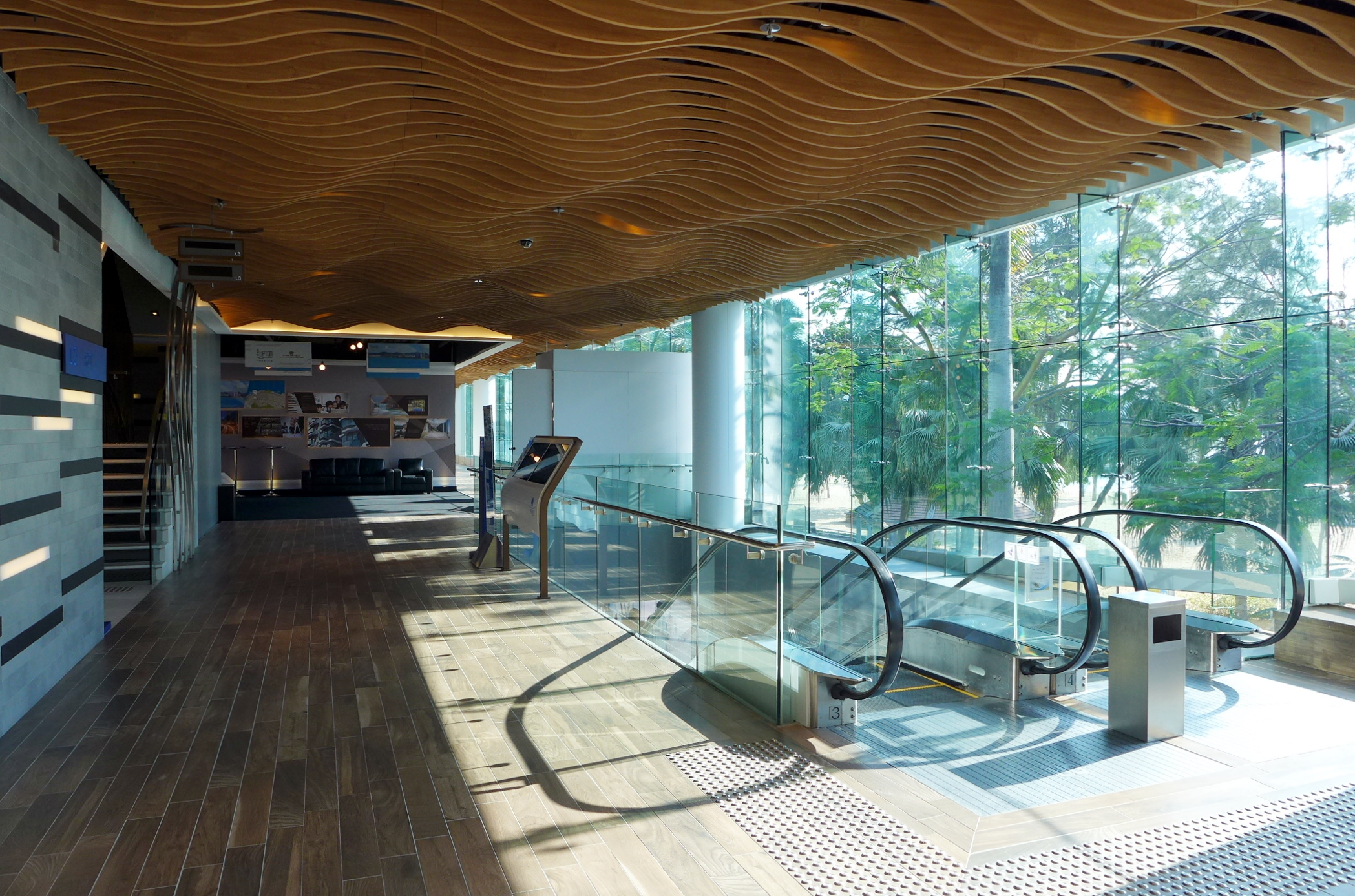
L2 interior

The Pulse is a six-storey, 167,000-square-foot (15,500 m^{2}) shopping centre located on Beach Road at Repulse Bay Beach in Repulse Bay, Hong Kong. It is owned by Emperor International Holdings Limited.

== History ==
=== Former use ===
The site was formerly home to the Lido Complex. Developed by Lido Development (a subsidiary of the Fung Ping Fan company) and opened on 1 February 1976, the complex was marketed as a "year-round resort" and housed restaurants and recreational facilities. The complex was expanded in 1983.

The 49,690-square-foot (4,616 m^{2}) complex was put up for sale when Fung Ping Fan ran into financial difficulties. It was sold (excluding the McDonald's restaurant) to Hairich Limited, a subsidiary of Intercontinental Housing Development (IHD) Limited, in 1987.

In 1993, IHD announced it would sell the complex to Gold Shine Investment, a company 55 per cent owned by Emperor International Holdings, 25 per cent by IHE itself, 15 per cent by Supreity and five per cent by Sonny Yeung Hoi-sing.

=== Illegal redevelopment ===
In 1998, Emperor International got Town Planning Board approval to develop a three-storey shopping centre on the site. The company bought the Lido Complex's McDonald's shop in mid-2000 for HK$36.8 million, allowing the redevelopment to move ahead. The firm stated that year that it would spend about HK$500 million on the development.

Emperor International built a 143,000-square-foot (13,300 m^{2}), six-storey shopping arcade called "The Pulse" on the site, which was substantially complete by 2011. However, it did so without the consent of the Lands Department, in breach of the land lease conditions. This led to a protracted legal battle between the developer and the government. The shopping centre remained empty, leading to public complaints over the lack of shopping and dining options along the beach.

In May 2012, the issue was settled, with Emperor International Group Limited paying a HK$798 million land premium to the Hong Kong government. The shopping centre subsequently opened in November 2014.
