= Deep Water Bay =

Residential area on Hong Kong Island

Coordinates: 22.241661°N 114.182619°E

Deep Water Bay 深水灣
- Residential
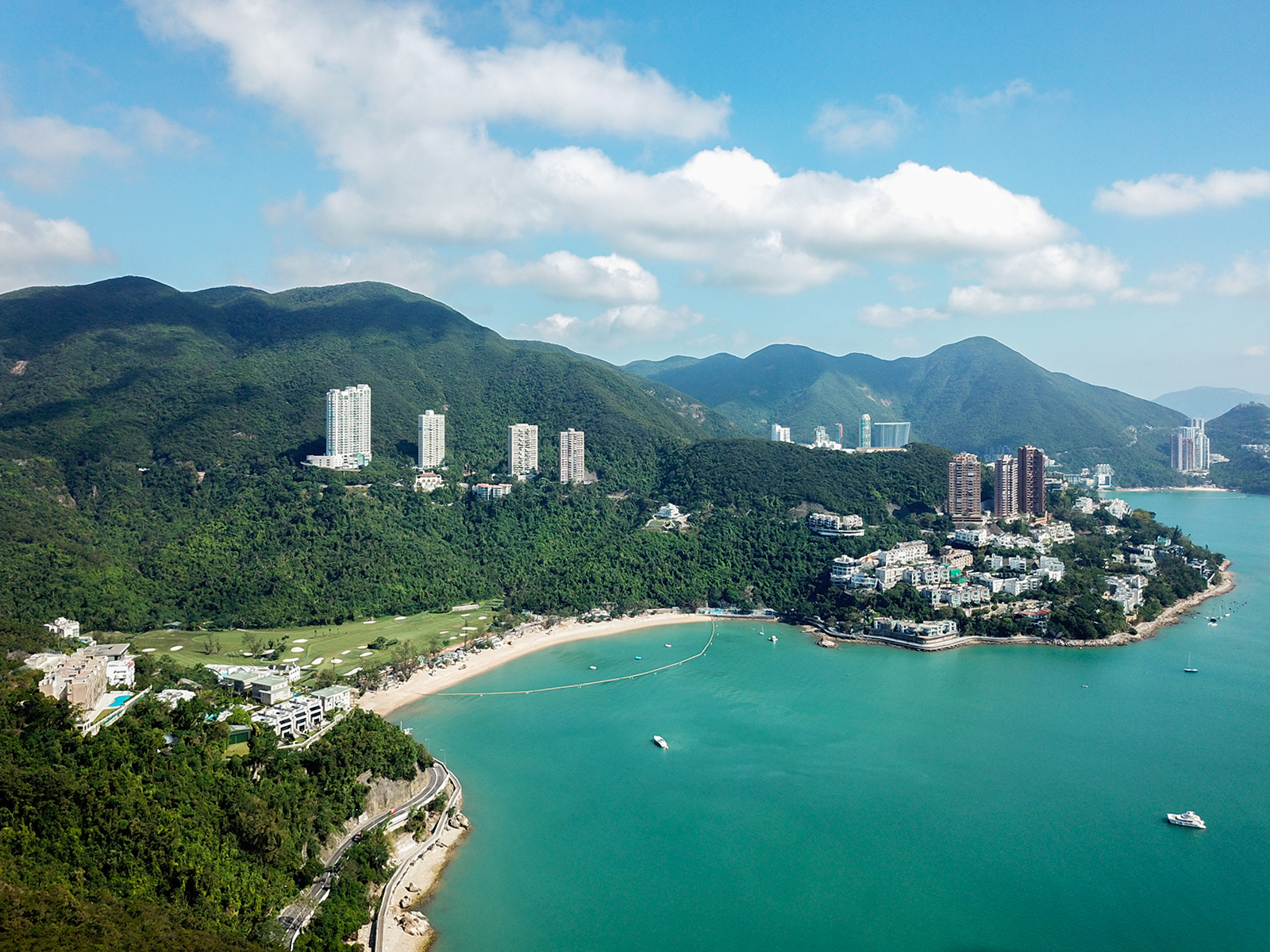
- Aerial view of Deep Water Bay
- Interactive map of Deep Water Bay
- District: Southern
- Region: Hong Kong Island
- Country: China
- SAR: Hong Kong

Deep Water Bay
- Traditional Chinese: 深水灣
- Simplified Chinese: 深水湾
Transcriptions
Standard Mandarin
- Hanyu Pinyin: Shēnshuǐwān
Yue: Cantonese
- Yale Romanization: Sām séui wāan
- Jyutping: Sam1 seoi2 waan1

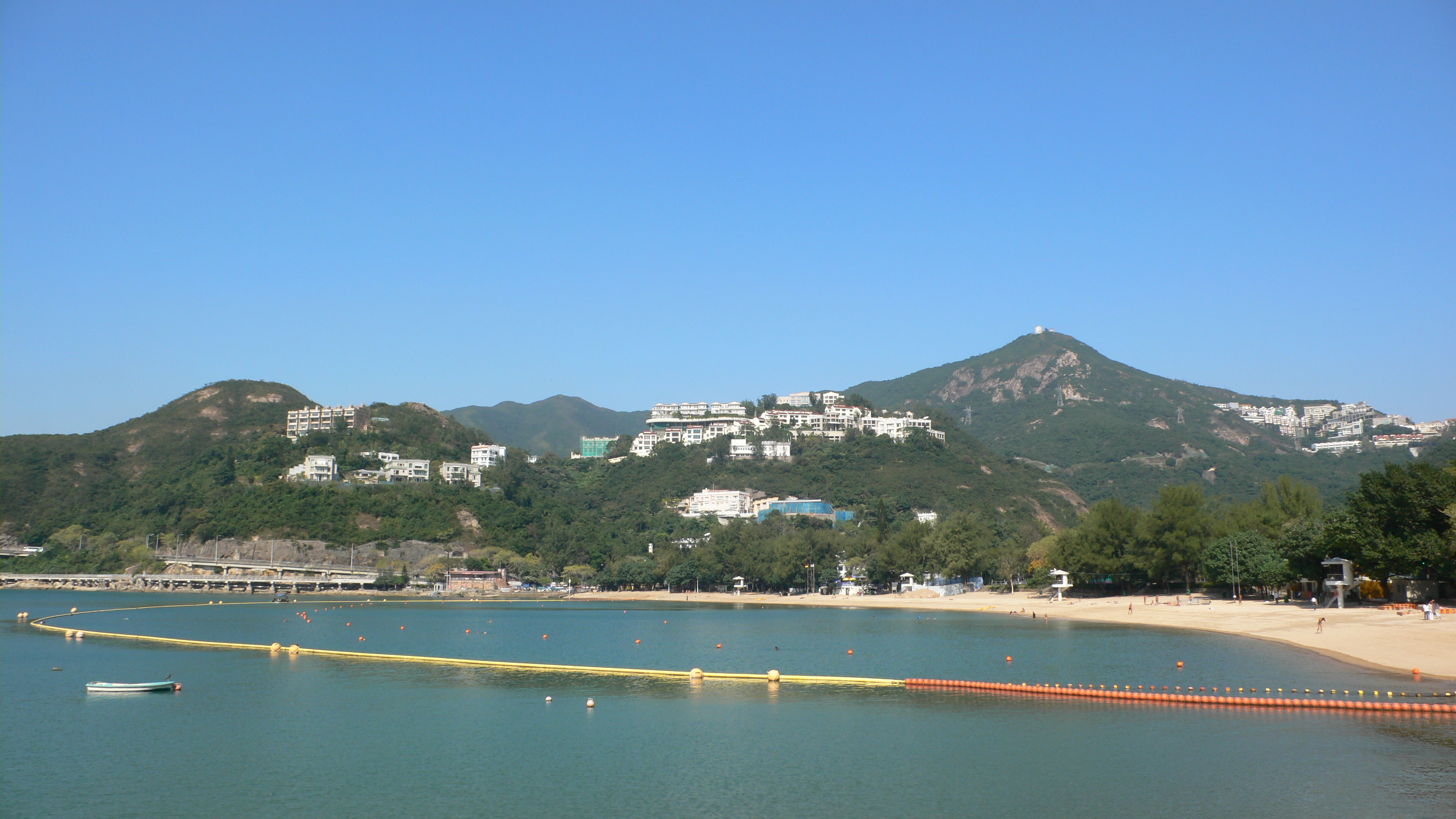
Deep Water Bay Beach.

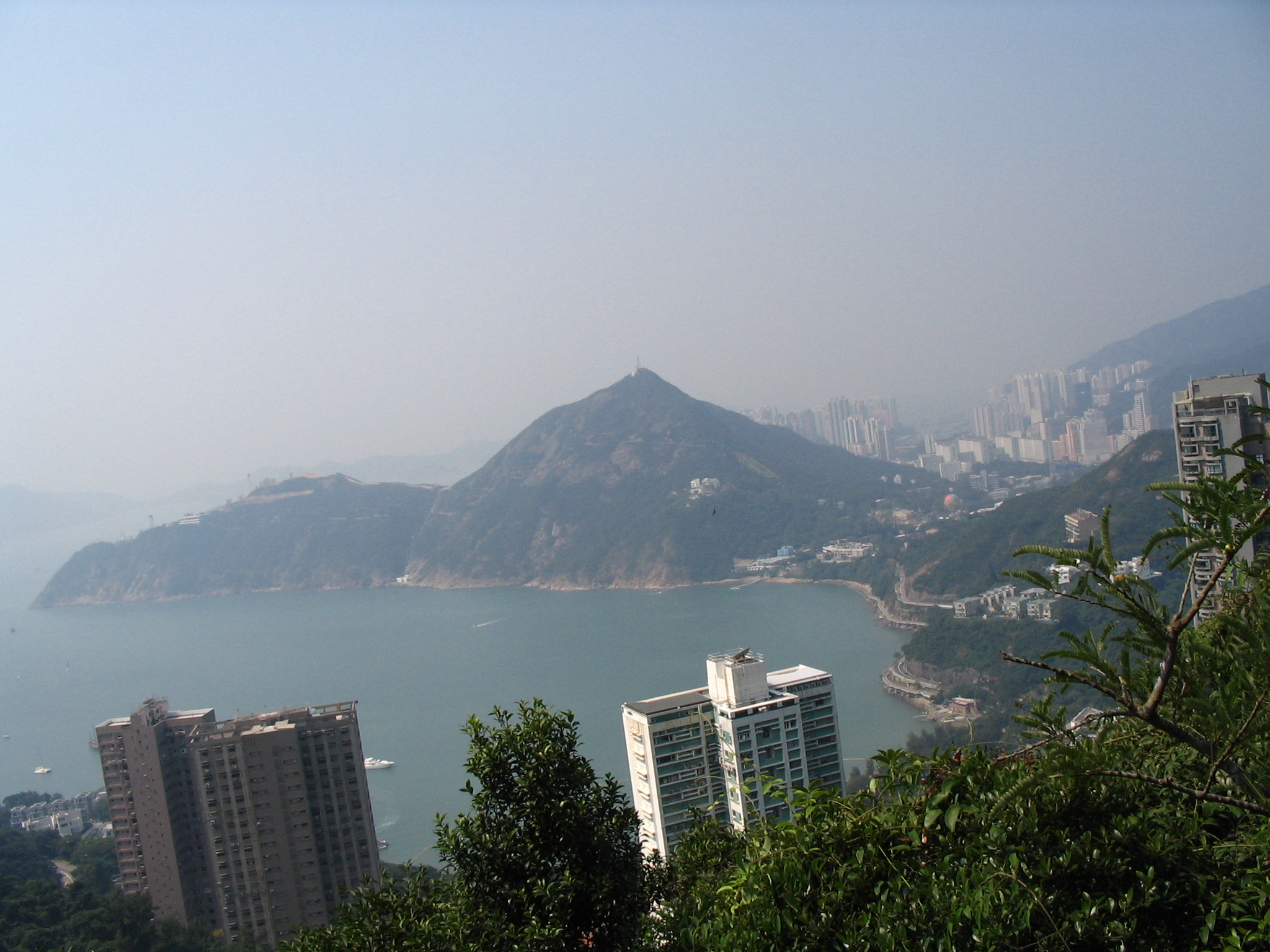
View of Brick Hill and Ocean Park across Deep Water Bay.

Deep Water Bay is a bay and residential area on the southern shore of Hong Kong Island in Hong Kong. The bay is surrounded by Shouson Hill, Brick Hill, Violet Hill and Middle Island. With a large portion of the city's richest billionaires, Forbes referred to the area as "the wealthiest neighborhood on earth".

Deep Water Bay is Hong Kong's most expensive residential area, with house prices (per sq.ft.) higher than Jardine's Lookout, which ranks second, and much more than Victoria Peak, which ranks third. The area is known for being the preferred destination for Hong Kong's old-moneyed elite, and also benefit from having the most convenient access and least traffic on the south side of Hong Kong Island.

The neighborhood is bordered on the east by Repulse Bay Road heading to the Island Road roundabout, on the south by Island Road facing toward Middle Island and Deep Water Bay, on the west by Deep Water Bay Road, and on the north by Deep Water Bay Road as it connects back toward Repulse Bay Road.

Beneath Violet Hill is Deep Water Bay Beach, one of many beaches of Hong Kong. The bay is reachable by Island Road, a road connecting Repulse Bay and Wong Chuk Hang

Deep Water Bay is the landing point for SEA-ME-WE 3, TGN-IA and TVH submarine telecommunications cables.

== History ==
Originally, the bay was called Heong Kong Bay, as shown in a British map from 1841. A village with the name Hong Kong lay to its north in what is now Shouson Hill, which can still be seen in a map from 1845, when the bay was already known under the name Deep Water Bay.

At the time of the 1911 census, the population of Deep Water Bay was only 8.

== Deep Water Bay Beach ==
Less known to tourists than the adjacent Repulse Bay, Deep Water Bay Beach is nonetheless very popular among local people. Seaview Promenade, on the east side of Deep Water Bay, connects it with Repulse Bay via a path which allows joggers and walkers alike to exercise alongside the seashore while admiring the stunning sea view. On the west side, Mills & Chung Path connects Deep Water Bay with Wong Chuk Hang.

Changing rooms, shower facilities and barbecue pits are available under the management of the Leisure and Cultural Services Department.

== Deep Water Bay residential area ==
Deep Water Bay is one of the most expensive neighbourhoods in the world, and the most exclusive residential area of Hong Kong as per Forbes and Forbes Life. Nineteen of the city's richest billionaires reside within the area, amongst them a net aggregate worth of $123 billion (as of August 2015). The most prominent addresses are Repulse Bay Road (Nos 1-67 only), Island Road, and Deep Water Bay Road. Considered the most prime location on the south side of Hong Kong island, Deep Water Bay residents have included property, casino, shipping and oil tycoons including Li Ka Shing, Cheng Yu-tung, Joseph Lau, Robert Kuok, Lui Che Woo, Michael Kadoorie, Thomas Kwok, Raymond Kwok, as well as the e-commerce tycoon, Joseph Tsai.. All live within Deep Water Bay along Repulse Bay Road, Island Road, and Deep Water Bay Road.

Prominent addresses in Deep Water Bay are: Repulse Bay Road numbers 1 through 67, and numbers 2 through 44 (section only "before the roundabout", ie the Island Road roundabout, facing Deep Water Bay). These include low rise townhomes, such as at 36 Repulse Bay Road, detached larger homes, such as at 20 Repulse Bay Road, and luxury apartments with expansive views and duplex or triplex layout, such as at 63 Repulse Bay Road. Island Road (numbers 2 through 52) features town homes and some detached villas located directly in the water; and Deep Water Bay Road which features mostly detached homes on the slopes overlooking the Hong Kong Golf Club and Deep Water Bay beach.

== Education ==
Deep Water Bay is in Primary One Admission (POA) School Net 18. Within the school net are multiple aided schools (operated independently but funded with government money) and Hong Kong Southern District Government Primary School.

== Conservation ==
Deep Water Bay Valley was designated a Site of Special Scientific Interest in 2008.

== Transportation ==
Buses No. 6A, 6X or 260 from Central's Exchange Square, 65 from North Point Ferry, 73 from Cyberport & Aberdeen, 973 from Tsim Sha Tsui and green minibuses 40 and 52 have stops at Deep Water Bay.

== See also ==
- HMS Tern (1927)
