= Middle Island, Hong Kong =

Island of Hong Kong, Southern District

Middle Island
Native name: 熨波洲
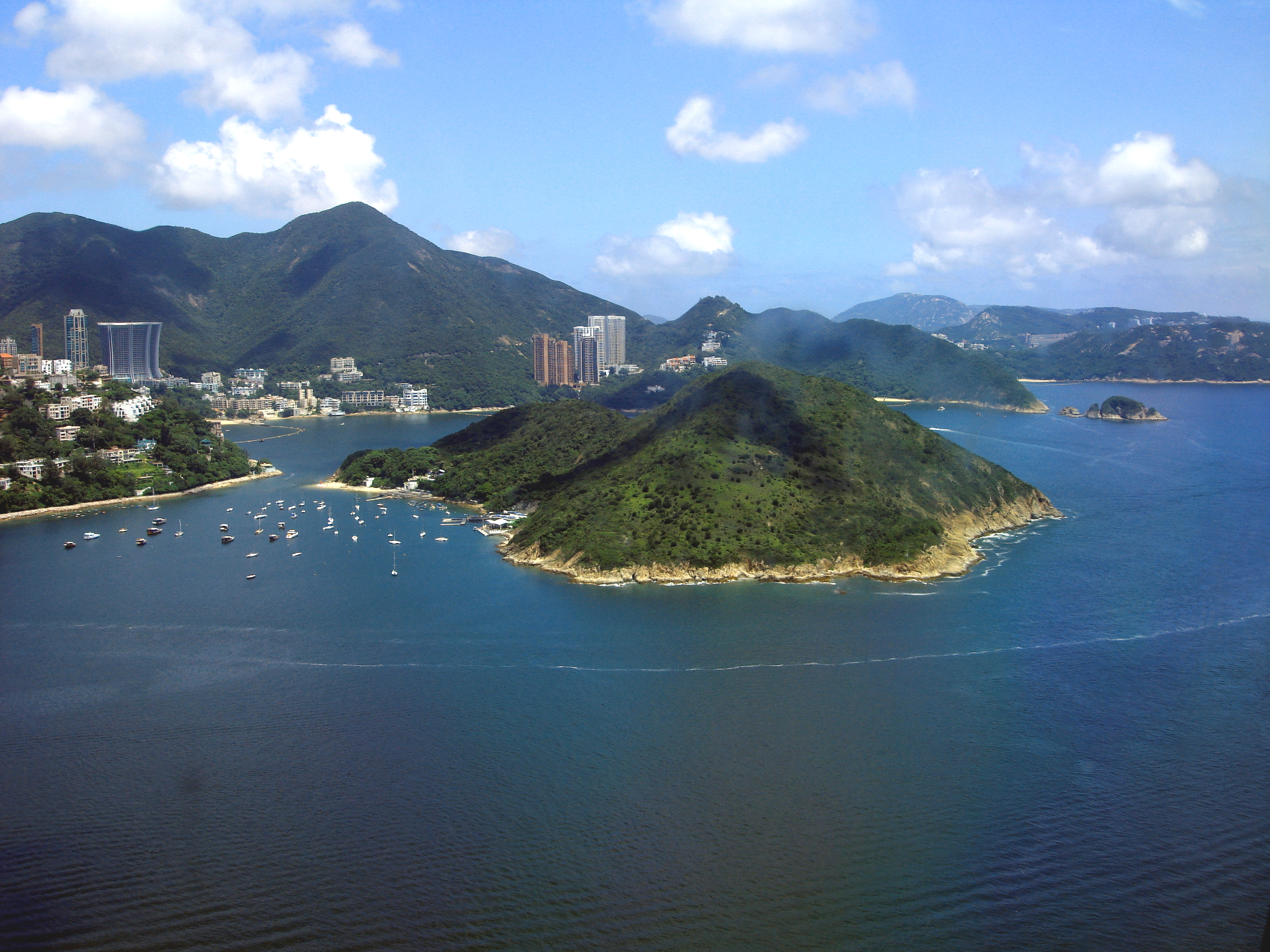
- View of Middle Island, off Hong Kong Island (left) between Deep Water Bay and Repulse Bay (background, left). Viewed from the Ocean Park cable car ride.

- Location within Hong Kong

Geography
- Coordinates: 22.23550°N 114.18794°E

Administration
- Hong Kong
- Districts: Southern District

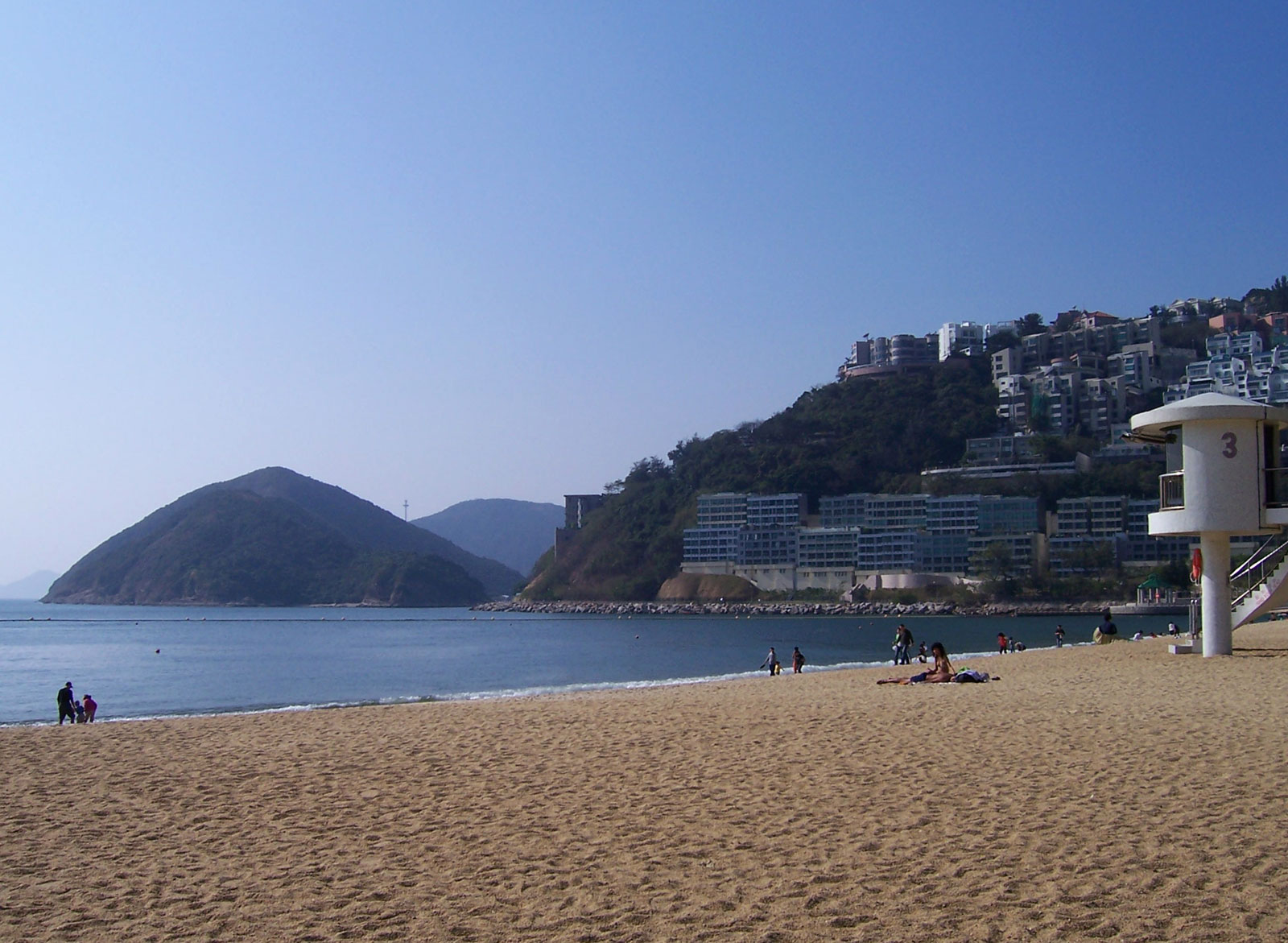
Middle Island (left), seen from Repulse Bay

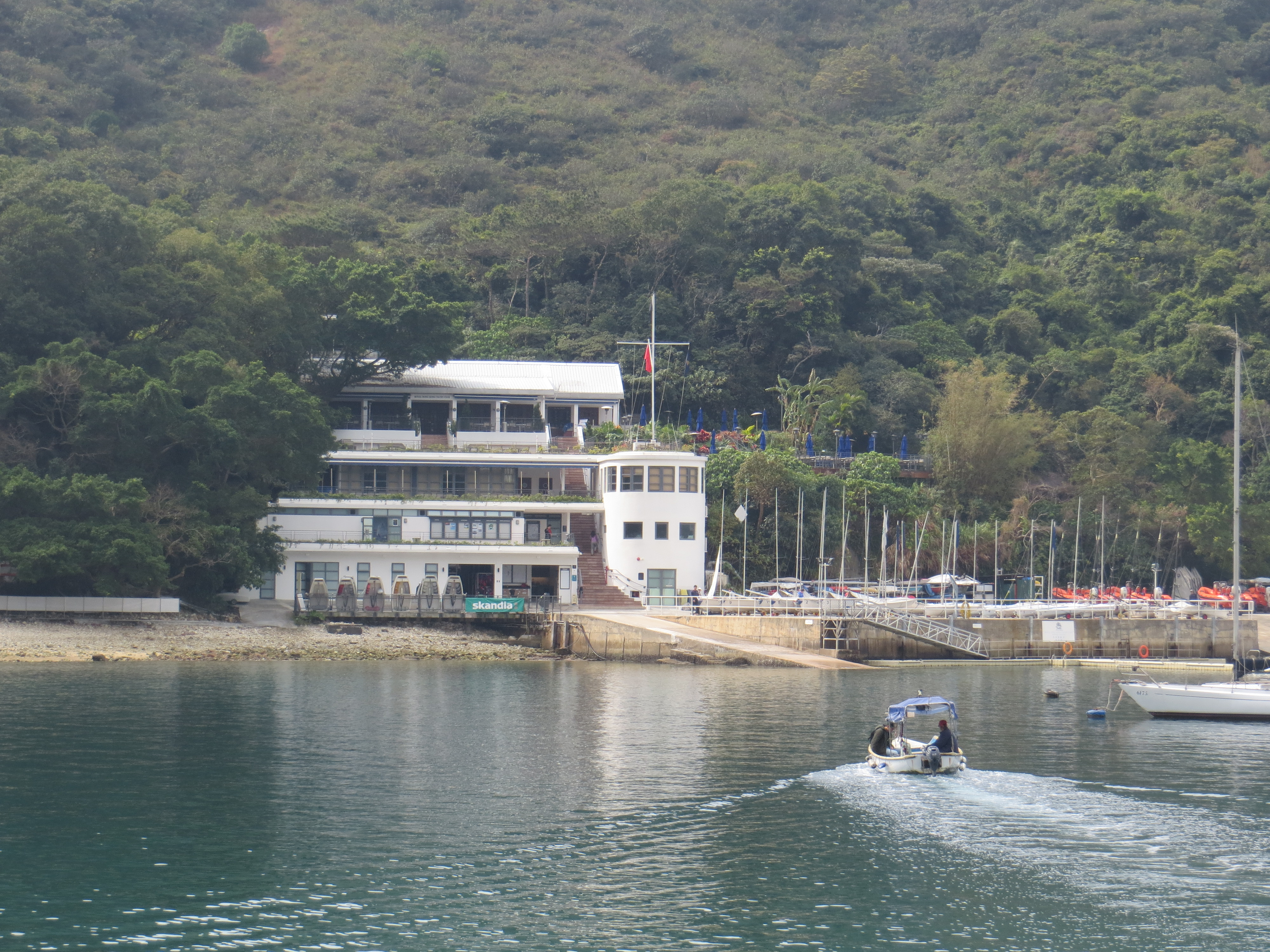
Royal Hong Kong Yacht Club's clubhouse on Middle Island.

Middle Island, also known as Tong Po Chau (Chinese: 熨波洲) is an island of Hong Kong. Administratively, it is part of Southern District.

== Geography ==
Middle Island is located 100 m off the southern coast of Hong Kong Island, between Deep Water Bay and Repulse Bay.

== Features ==
Middle Island houses one of the three clubhouses of the Royal Hong Kong Yacht Club. The clubhouse is accessible by the Club's own sampan ferry from Deep Water Bay. Close to the clubhouse is a beach that is accessible to the public.

The island also houses the Middle Island Clubhouse of the Aberdeen Boat Club. The Clubhouse is open daily except Mondays.

There is also a Tin Hau temple and a Tai Wong Ye temple on the island.

== See also ==
- List of islands and peninsulas of Hong Kong
