= Repulse Bay to Ince Bay Important Bird Area =

Coordinates: 21°03′29″S 149°05′26″E

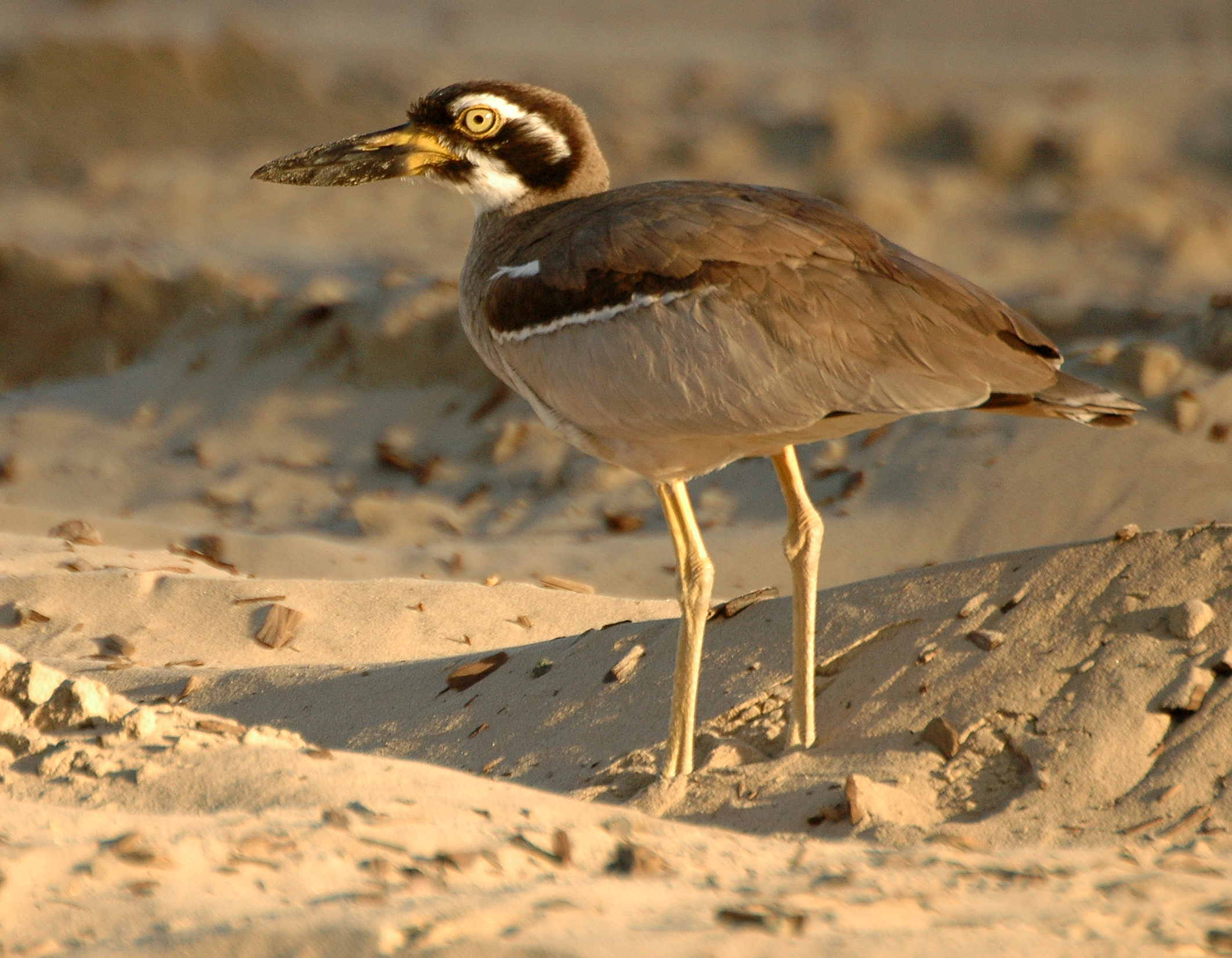
The IBA is an important site for beach stone-curlews.

The Repulse Bay to Ince Bay Important Bird Area is a disjunct stretch of coastline comprising a series of relatively sheltered beaches in the Mackay-Whitsunday region of Central Queensland, north-eastern Australia. With an area of 134 km^{2}, it extends for about 180 km from Repulse Bay in the north through the city of Mackay to Ince Bay and Cape Palmerston in the south. It is an important site for waders, or shorebirds.

== Description ==
Most of the site consists of intertidal mudflats and estuaries providing feeding habitat for waders, with areas of sand and mangroves. It includes 17 small, near-shore islands which provide roosting habitat. Areas excluded from the site are mostly exposed coasts. Much of the site lies within the Great Barrier Reef Marine Park, and a small area lies within the Cape Palmerston National Park.

== Birds ==
The site has been identified by BirdLife International as an Important Bird Area (IBA) because it regularly supports over 1% of the world populations of Far Eastern curlews, great knots, grey-tailed tattlers and pied oystercatchers, as well as beach stone-curlews and mangrove honeyeaters.
