= The Repulse Bay =

Residential building in Hong Kong

Coordinates: 22.2394°N 114.196°E

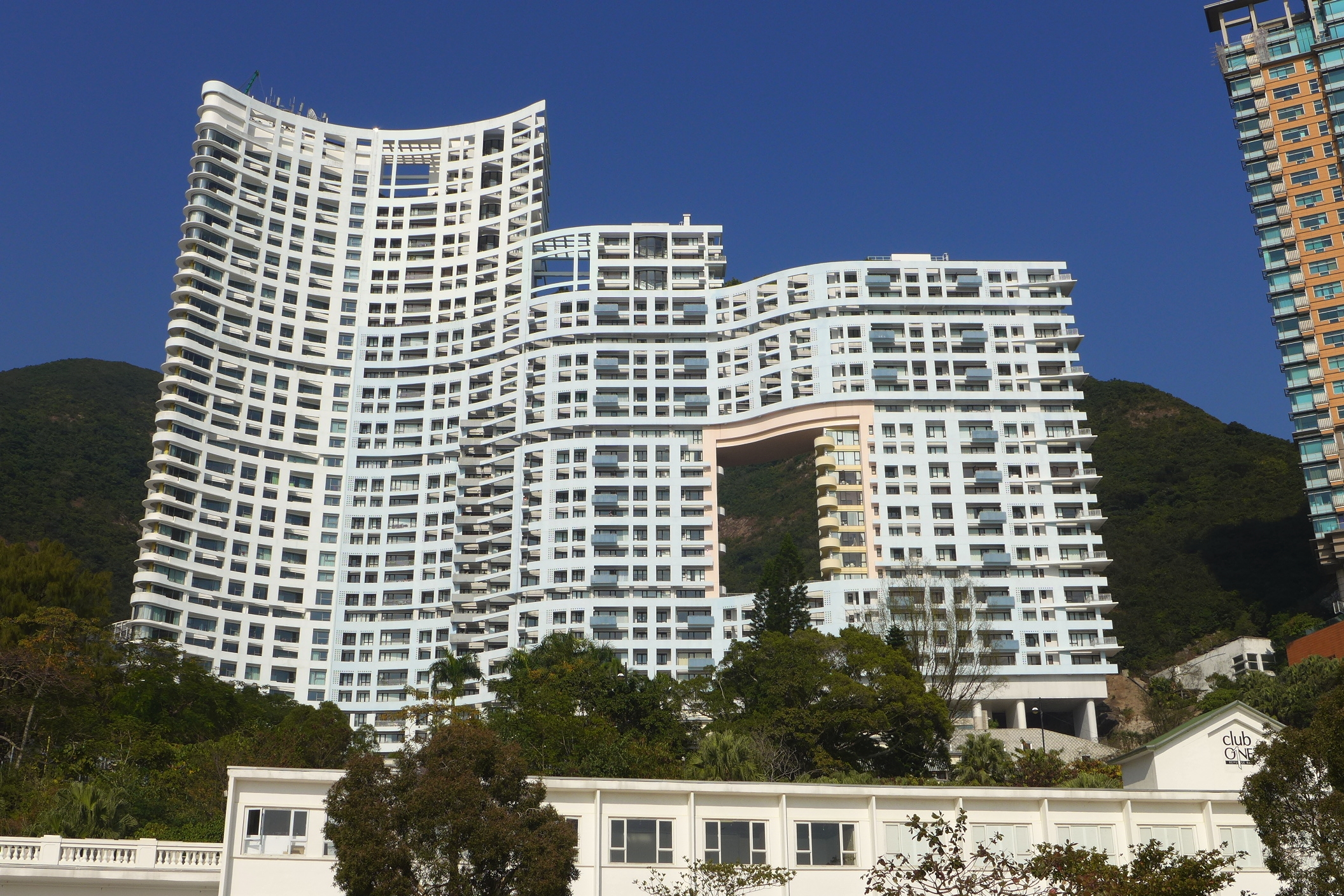
- The Repulse Bay
- Traditional Chinese: 影灣園
- Simplified Chinese: 影湾园
Transcriptions
Standard Mandarin
- Hanyu Pinyin: Yǐngwānyuán
Yue: Cantonese
- Jyutping: jing2 waan1 jyun4

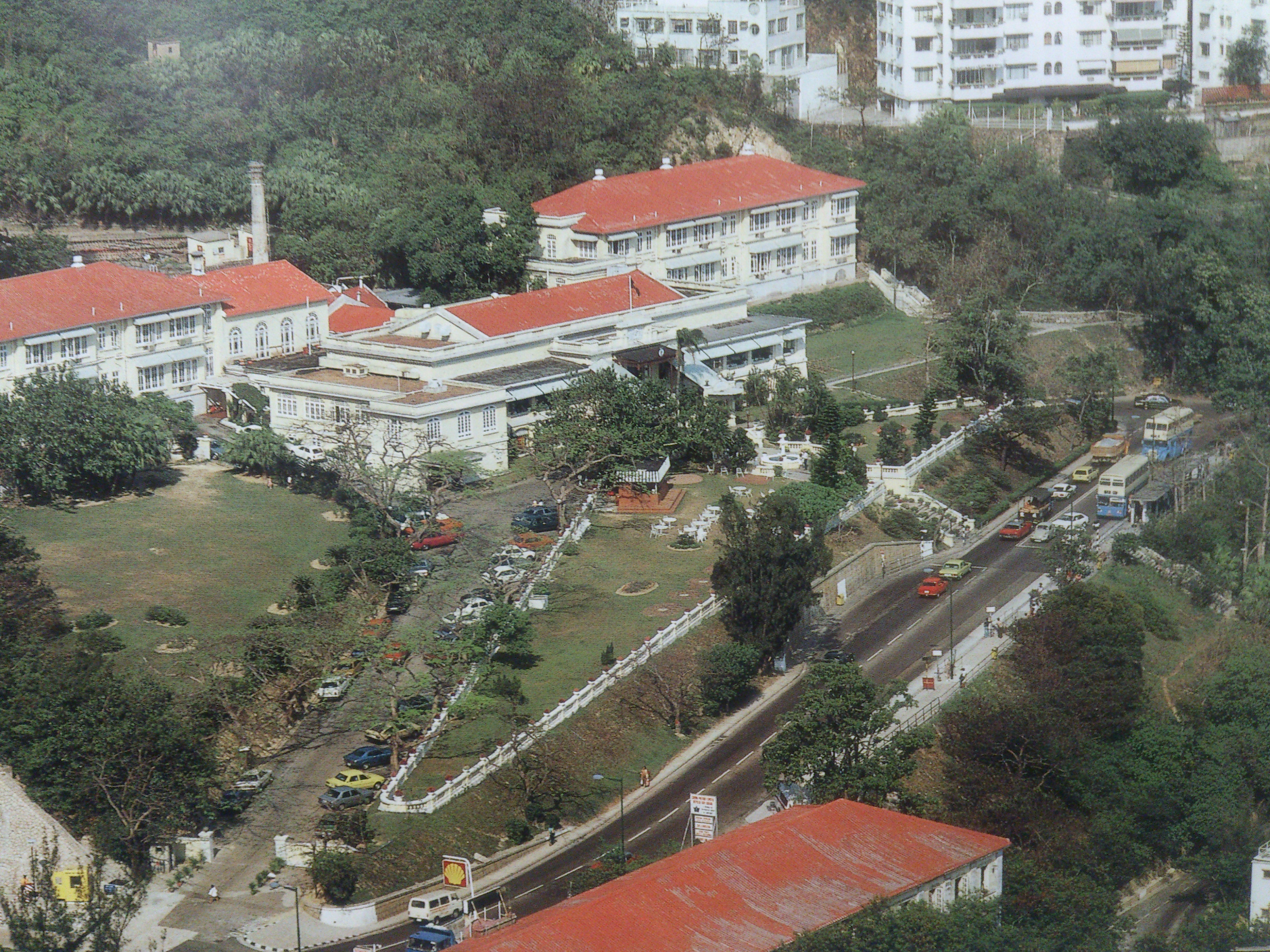
The Repulse Bay Hotel, before its demolition

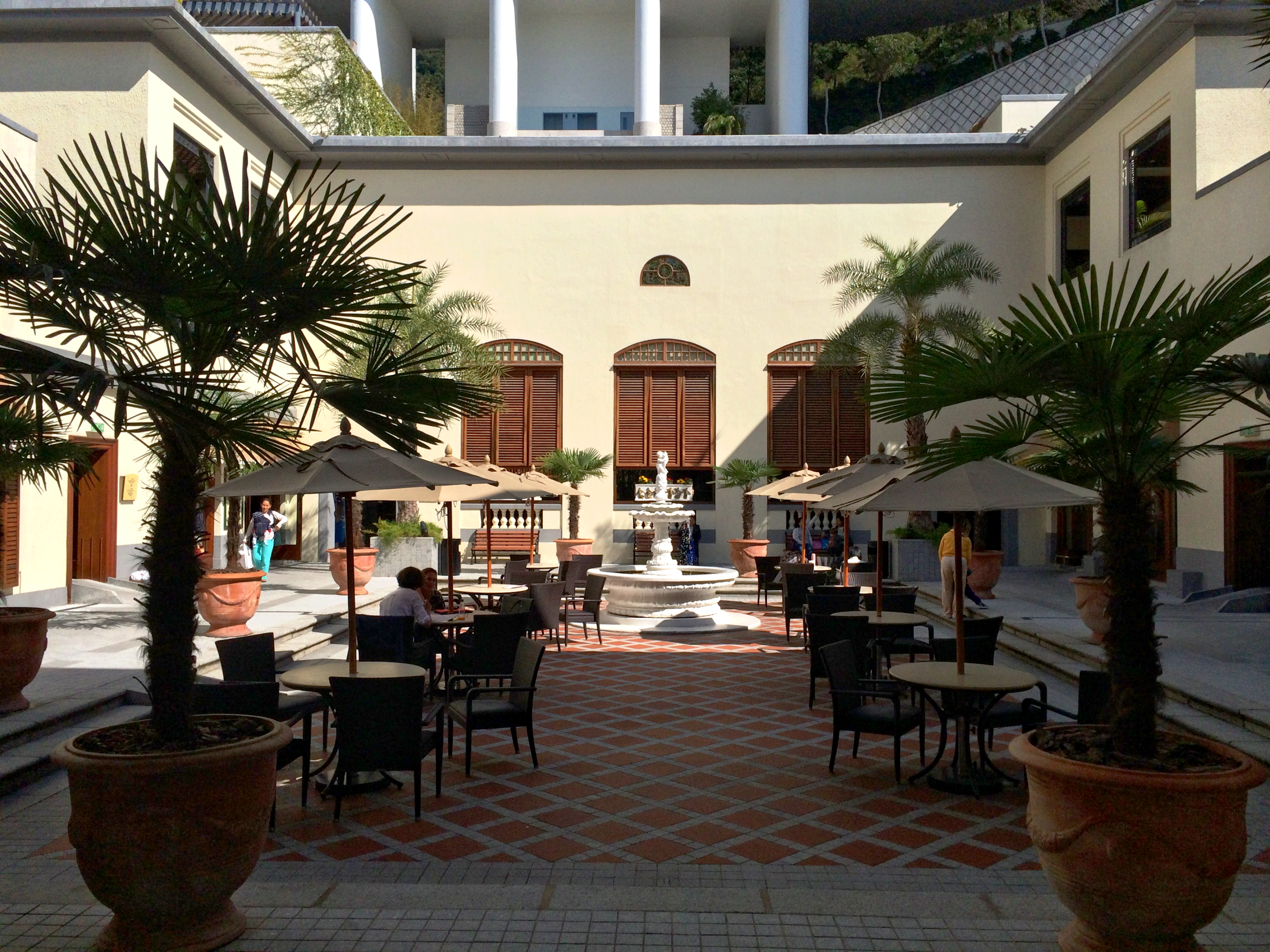
Courtyard of The Repulse Bay Shopping Arcade

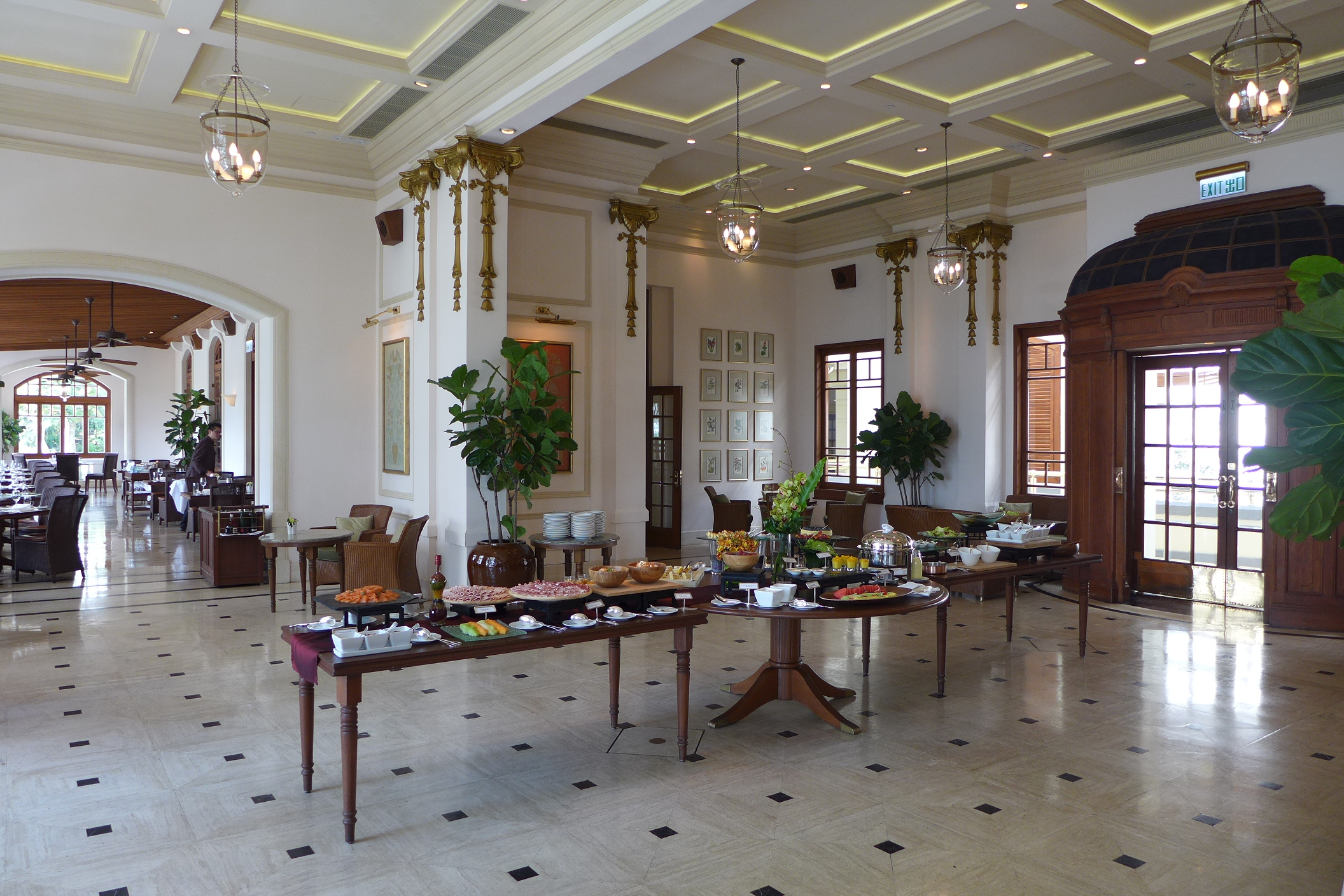
The Verandah restaurant

The Repulse Bay (Chinese: 影灣園) is a residential building and commercial arcade, located at 109 Repulse Bay Road in the Repulse Bay area of Hong Kong. It is owned by The Hongkong and Shanghai Hotels, Limited (HSH) and operated by Peninsula Properties, a subsidiary of HSH.

== History ==
The Repulse Bay occupies the site of the former colonial-style Repulse Bay Hotel (1920–1982), which was featured in the 1978 film Coming Home. The writer Eileen Chang arranged the leading male and female characters to meet here in her novel Love in a Fallen City.

The hotel was renowned for its British architectural style and was owned by Hongkong and Shanghai Hotels group of the Kadoorie family. During World War II it was used as a stronghold and a hospital by the Japanese forces.

Royalty and celebrities who found refuge at the hotel include writers George Bernard Shaw and Noël Coward. Actor Marlon Brando was a guest in the 1950s. Spain's Crown Prince Juan Carlos and Crown Princess Sofia spent their honeymoon there, while other royal guests included Prince Axel of Denmark and Prince Peter of Greece.

The Repulse Bay Hotel was demolished in 1982 for the redevelopment of the site. A replica of the original lobby building of the hotel was built on the site in 1986. A sequence in Ang Lee's 2007 film of Eileen Chang's novel Lust, Caution was filmed in the restaurant.

== Features ==
The present building is 37 floors high at its tallest. It comprises four towers, with the size of apartments ranging from 91 to 545 m^{2}. The four towers are named "Taggart", "Hartson", "Nicholson", and "De Ricou", after persons associated with the original Hotel. De Ricou tower is LEED certified and comprises 15 serviced apartments and was fully refurbished in 2012–2013.

The building is known for its square "hole", purportedly added for feng shui purposes. It received a silver medal at the 1989 Hong Kong Institute of Architects Annual Awards.

The Repulse Bay has two restaurants: The Verandah and Spices.

== See also ==
- Private housing estates in Hong Kong
