= Repulse Bay =

Bay in Southern Hong Kong

Coordinates: 22°13′50″N 114°11′10″E

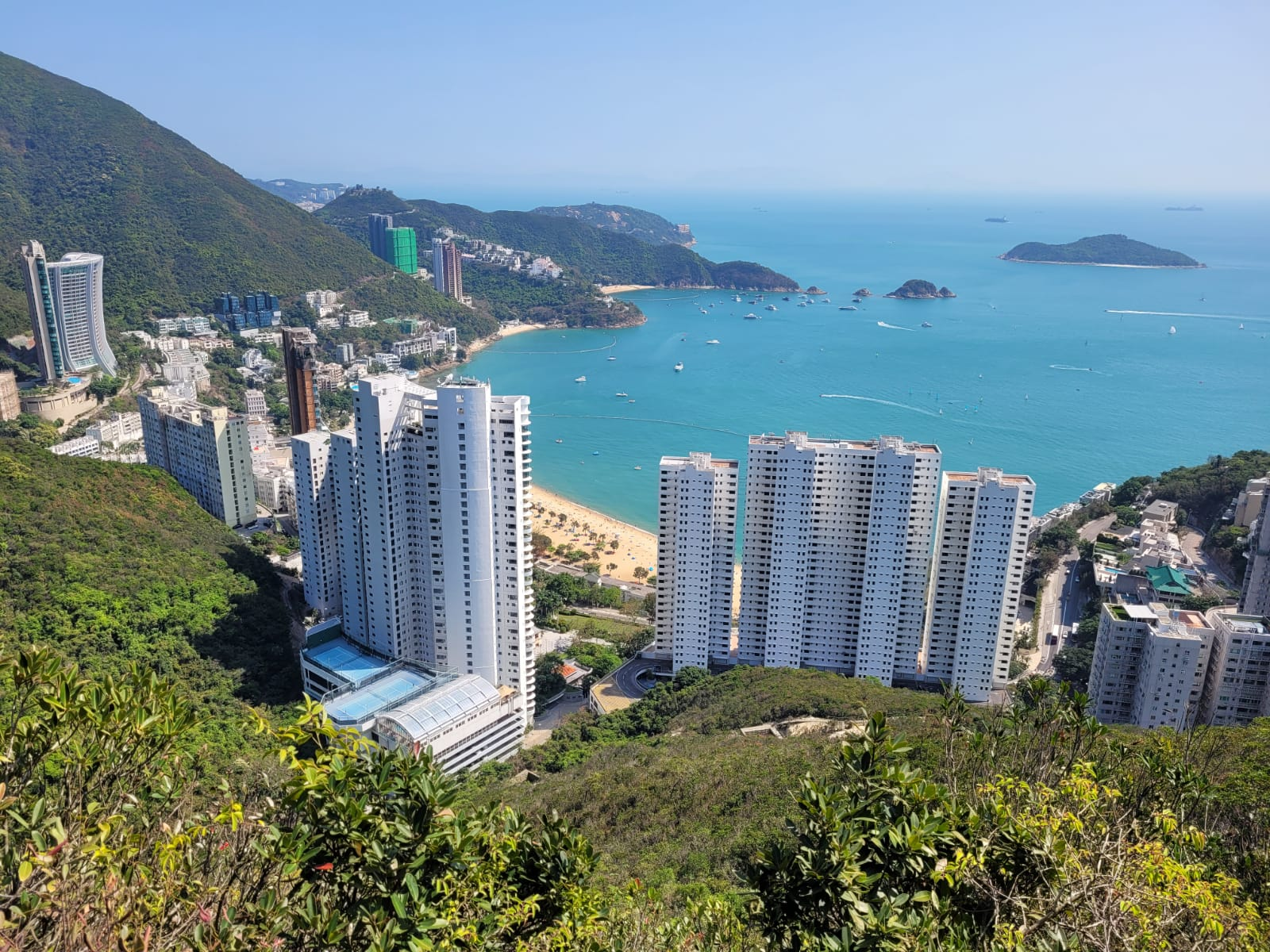
- View of Repulse Bay from Tsz Lo Lan Shan Path (on Violet Hill)
- Traditional Chinese: 淺水灣
- Simplified Chinese: 浅水湾
- Literal meaning: Shallow Water Bay
Transcriptions
Standard Mandarin
- Hanyu Pinyin: Qián shuǐ wān
- IPA: [tɕʰjɛ̌n.ʂwèɪ.wán]
Hakka
- Romanization: Cien^{3} Sui^{3} Van^{1}
Yue: Cantonese
- Yale Romanization: Chin Seui Waan
- Jyutping: Cin^{2} Seoi^{2} Waan^{1}
- IPA: [tsʰin˧˥.sɵɥ˧˥.wan˥]

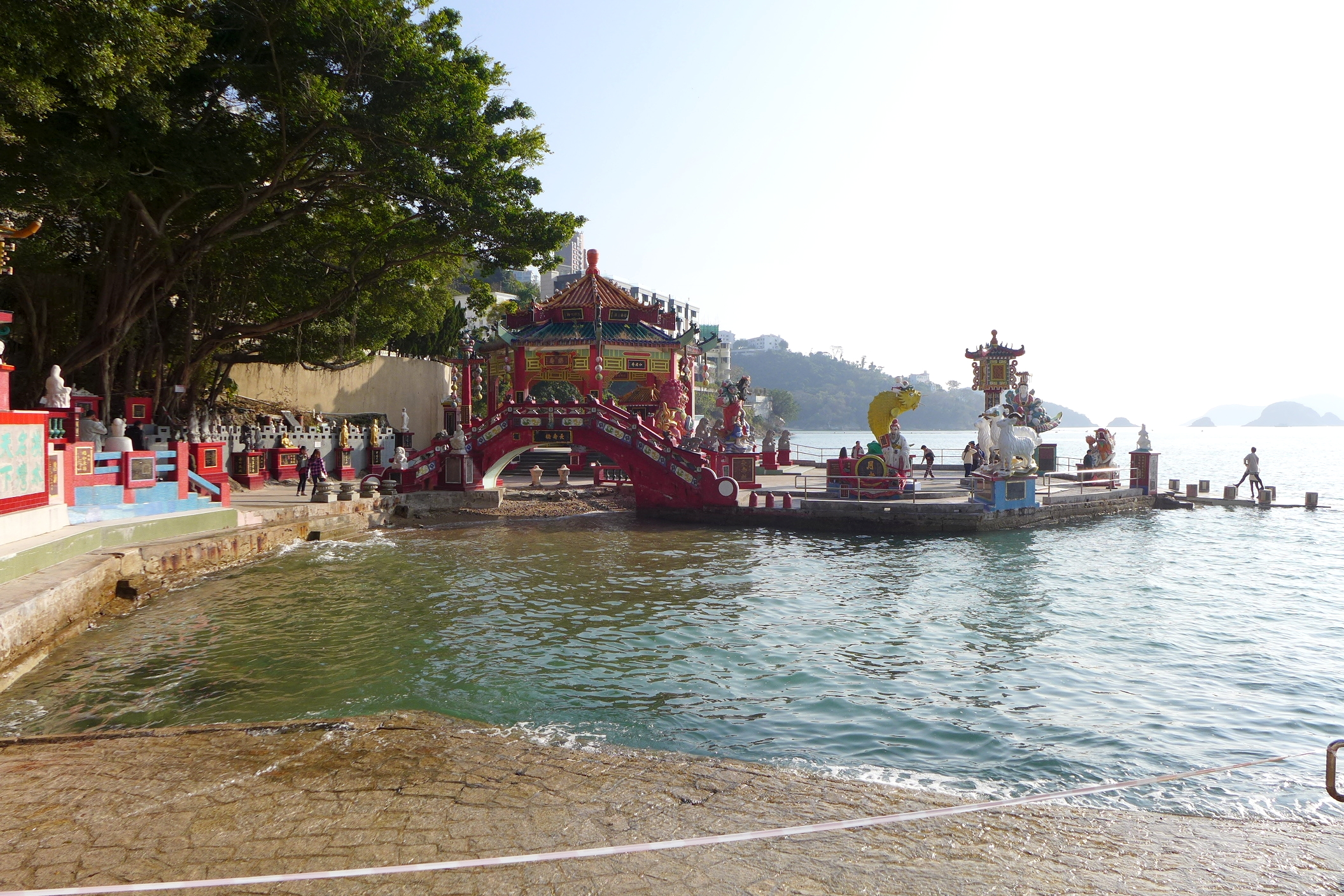
Longevity Bridge of Kwun Yam Shrine, Repulse Bay

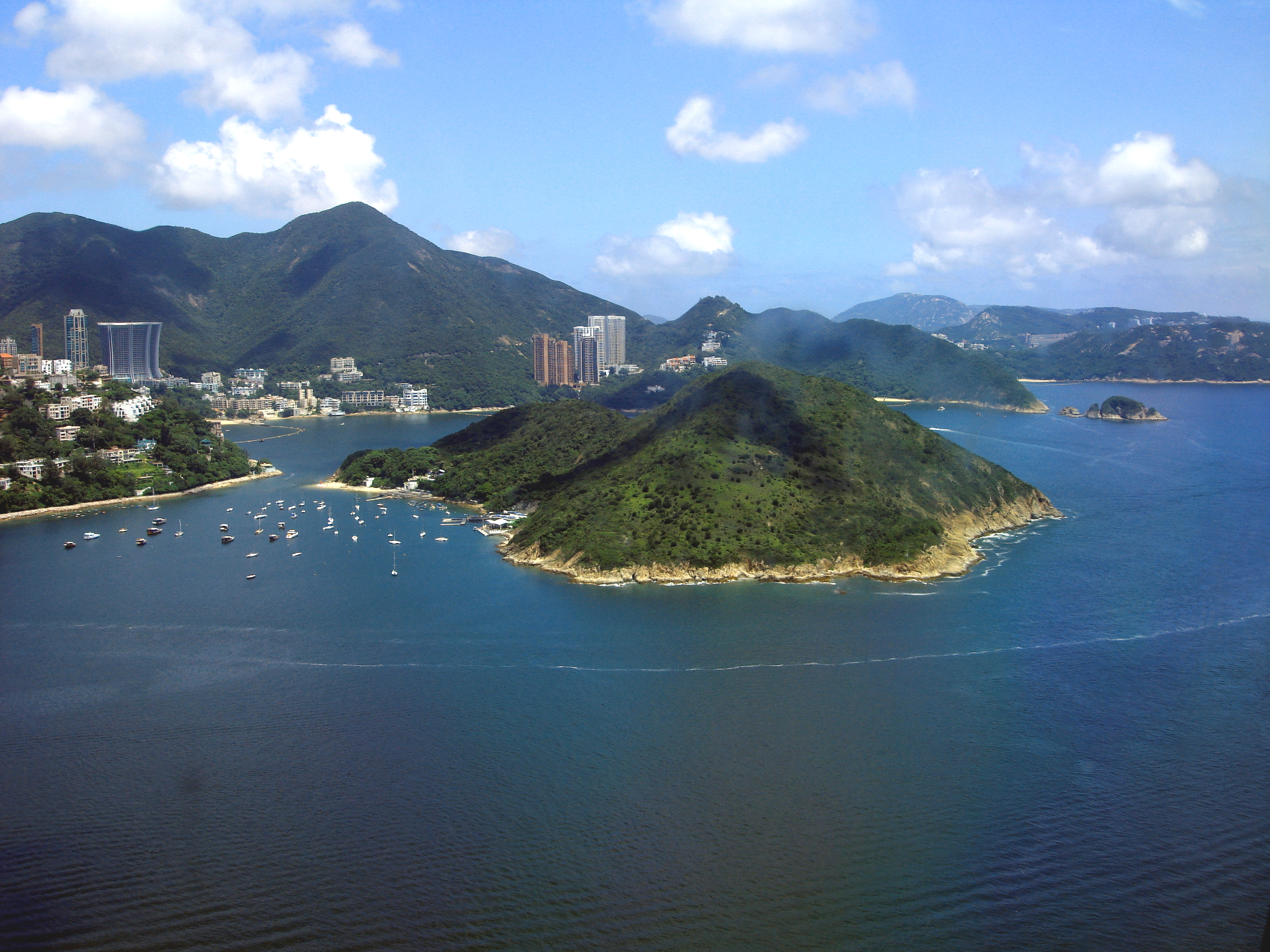
View of Middle Island, off Hong Kong Island (left) between Deep Water Bay and Repulse Bay (background, left). Viewed from the Ocean Park cable car ride.

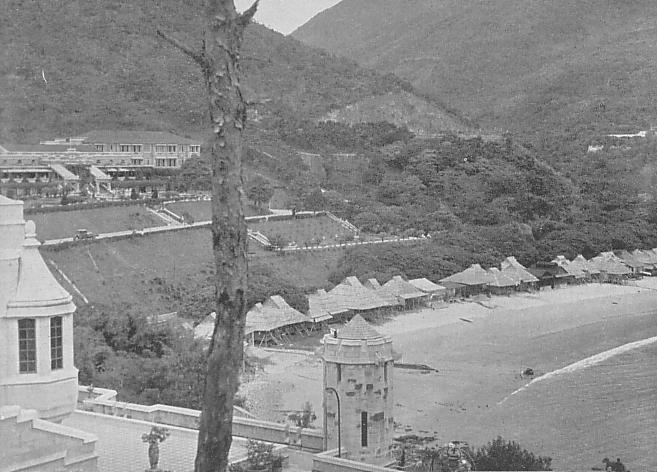
Repulse Bay in the 1930s, viewed from Eucliffe, with the Repulse Bay Hotel in the background.

Repulse Bay or Tsin Shui Wan is a bay in the southern part of Hong Kong Island, located in the Southern District, Hong Kong. It is one of the most expensive residential areas in the world.

== Geography ==
Repulse Bay is located in the southern part of Hong Kong Island, to the east of Deep Water Bay and to the west of Middle Bay and South Bay. Middle Island is located off Hong Kong Island, between Repulse Bay and Deep Water Bay.

== History ==
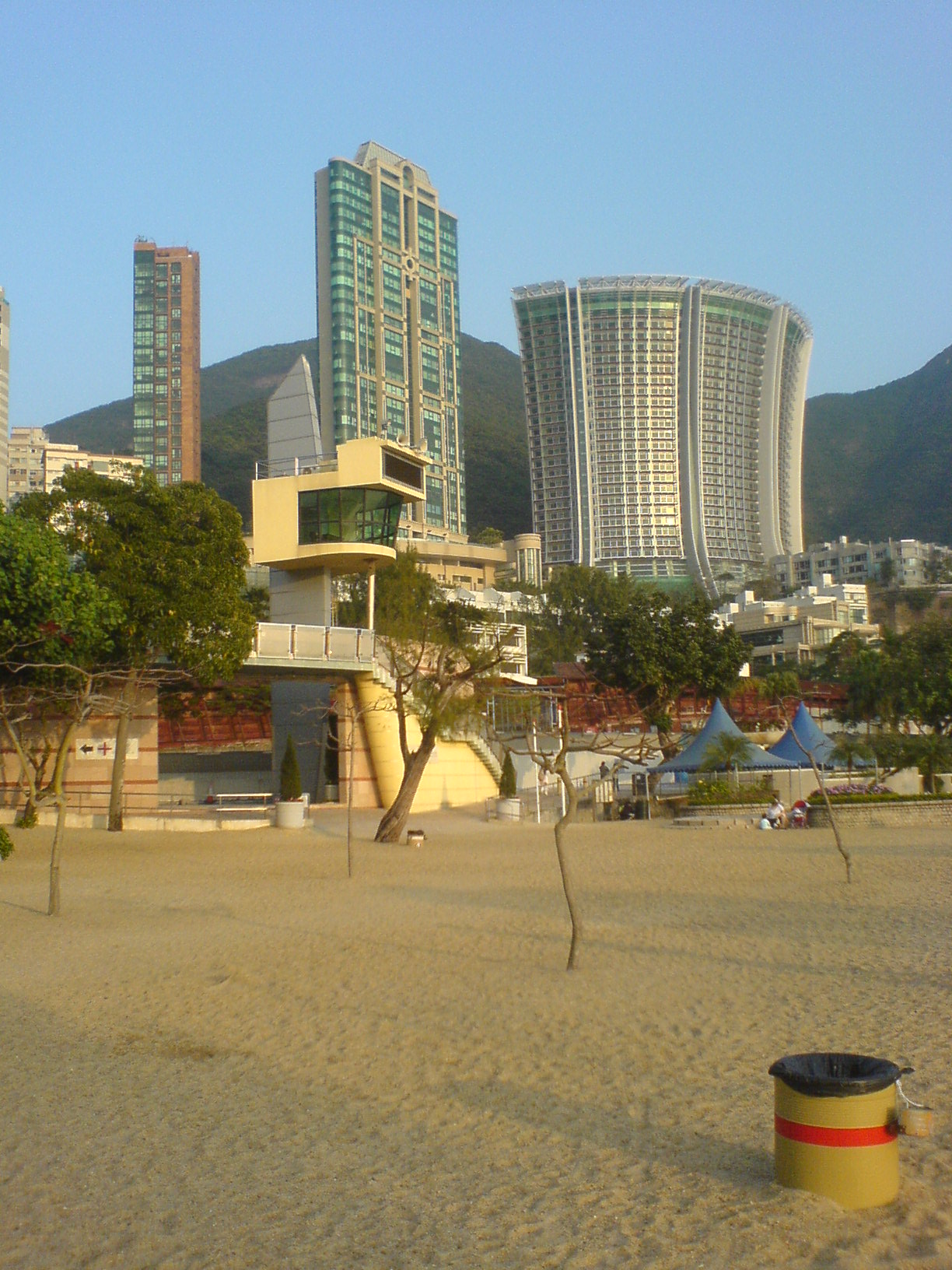
Repulse Bay Beach. The curved building in the background is "The Lily".

The origins of the bay's English name have become extremely obscure. There are, however, many stories — none resting on any solid evidence that has so far been established. A typical example is that in 1841, the bay was used as a base by pirates and caused serious concern to foreign merchant ships trading with China. The pirates were subsequently repulsed by the Royal Navy, hence the name. There is no evidence of any such origin in the extensive British naval log books of the period. Another story holds that the bay was named after HMS Repulse, which was stationed at the bay at one point. No HMS Repulse ever visited Hong Kong, let alone Repulse Bay and the 1868 Repulse served only on the west coast of the Americas (1872–77) and thereafter in British waters. Although an earlier ship, launched in 1855 and briefly bored the name HMS Repulse, was stationed in Hong Kong from 1874 but by then she had long been renamed HMS Victor Emmanuel. It is known that the name appeared on the earliest British official map of Hong Kong by Lt TB Collinson RE in 1845. However, British Admiralty charts never used the name until the 20th century, instead sticking to the quite erroneous name given by Commander Edward Belcher RN in his 1841 survey, Chonghom Bay. The source of the name remains unknown.

In 1898, the Hong Kong Golf Club opened in the valley behind the Deep Water Bay and became a social hub. Roads were developed between the South and the North parts of Hong Kong Island and in the 1910s, Repulse Bay was developed into a beach. The Repulse Bay Hotel was built by the Kadoorie family in 1920. To attract swimmers, a bus route from Central to Repulse Bay was created, and now stands as one of Hong Kong's oldest bus routes. The writer Ernest Hemingway and the American actor Marlon Brando stayed at the Repulse Bay Hotel.

During the Battle of Hong Kong in World War II, Repulse Bay was an important strategic location. The Repulse Bay Hotel was used by the Japanese as a military hospital during the war.

The beach was extended artificially, and thus the sand closer to the shore is coarser in texture than the sand further away. It is one of the longest beaches in Hong Kong with a length of 292 metres (960 feet).

American actors William Holden and Jennifer Jones stayed at the Repulse Bay Hotel in 1955 when they acted there in the film "Love Is a Many-Splendored Thing."

Until the early 1960s, residential buildings were quite restricted. Three blocks of six storey apartments were developed by Dr. P. P. (Put-Paw) Chiu and his brother P. W. (Put-Wai) Chiu, part way up the mountain overlooking Repulse Bay. These were luxury apartments with servants' quarters, with only two apartments per floor in Blocks A and B. Apartments in Block C are smaller. For a long time, these were the only apartments allowed on the mountain.

These included properties on Repulse Bay Road and South Bay Road, according to a record of projects by architect Luke Him Sau — the earliest of which (among the Chiu properties) dates back to 1952.

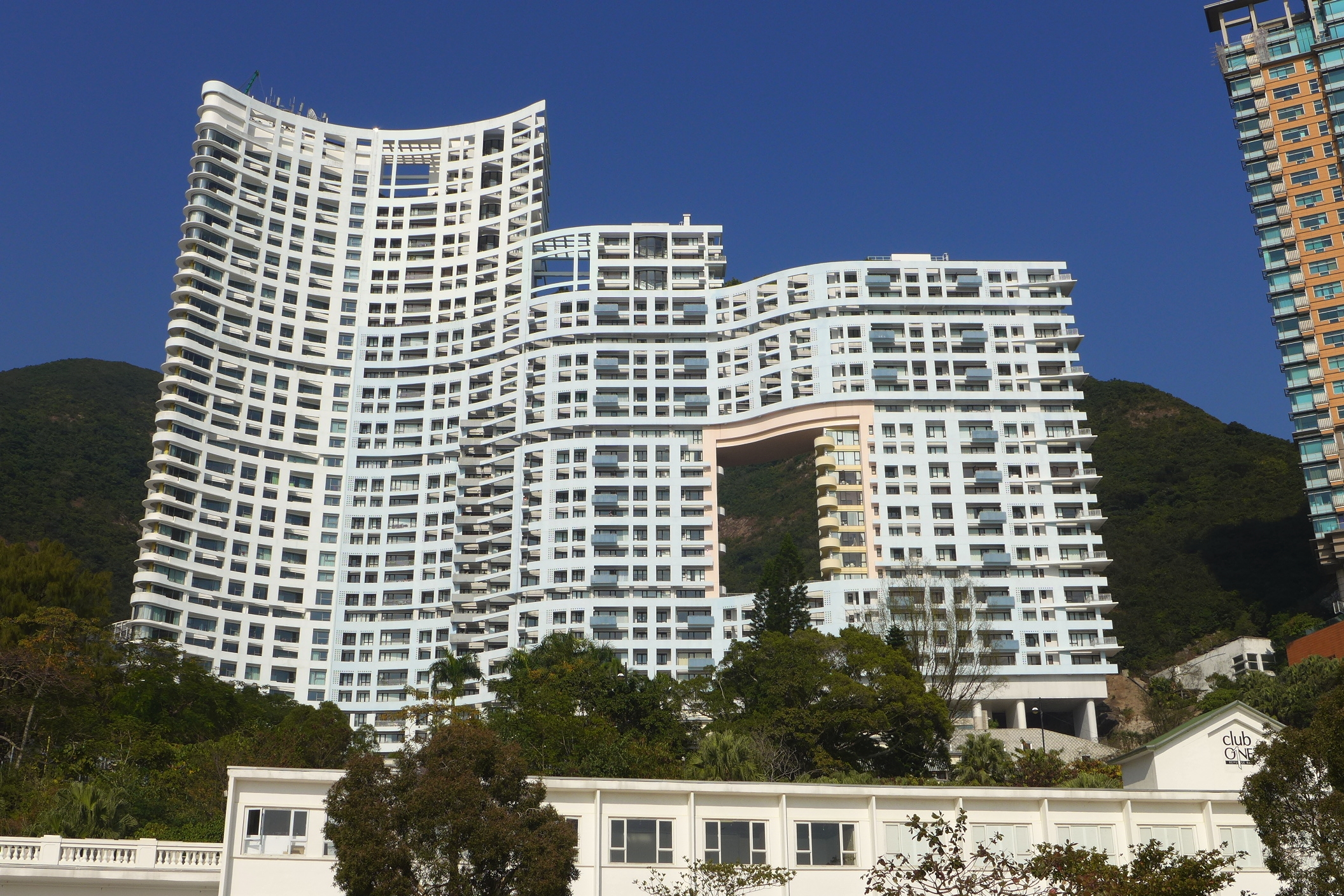
The "building with a hole" - The Repulse Bay, site of the former Repulse Bay Hotel

Occupying the whole of the west side cliff above the beach was a large castle with a swimming pool, greenhouse and tennis court called Eucliffe, one of three castles owned by the millionaire Eu Tong Sen. The Eucliffe structure and historical site was demolished to make way for a row of low apartments.

== Present ==
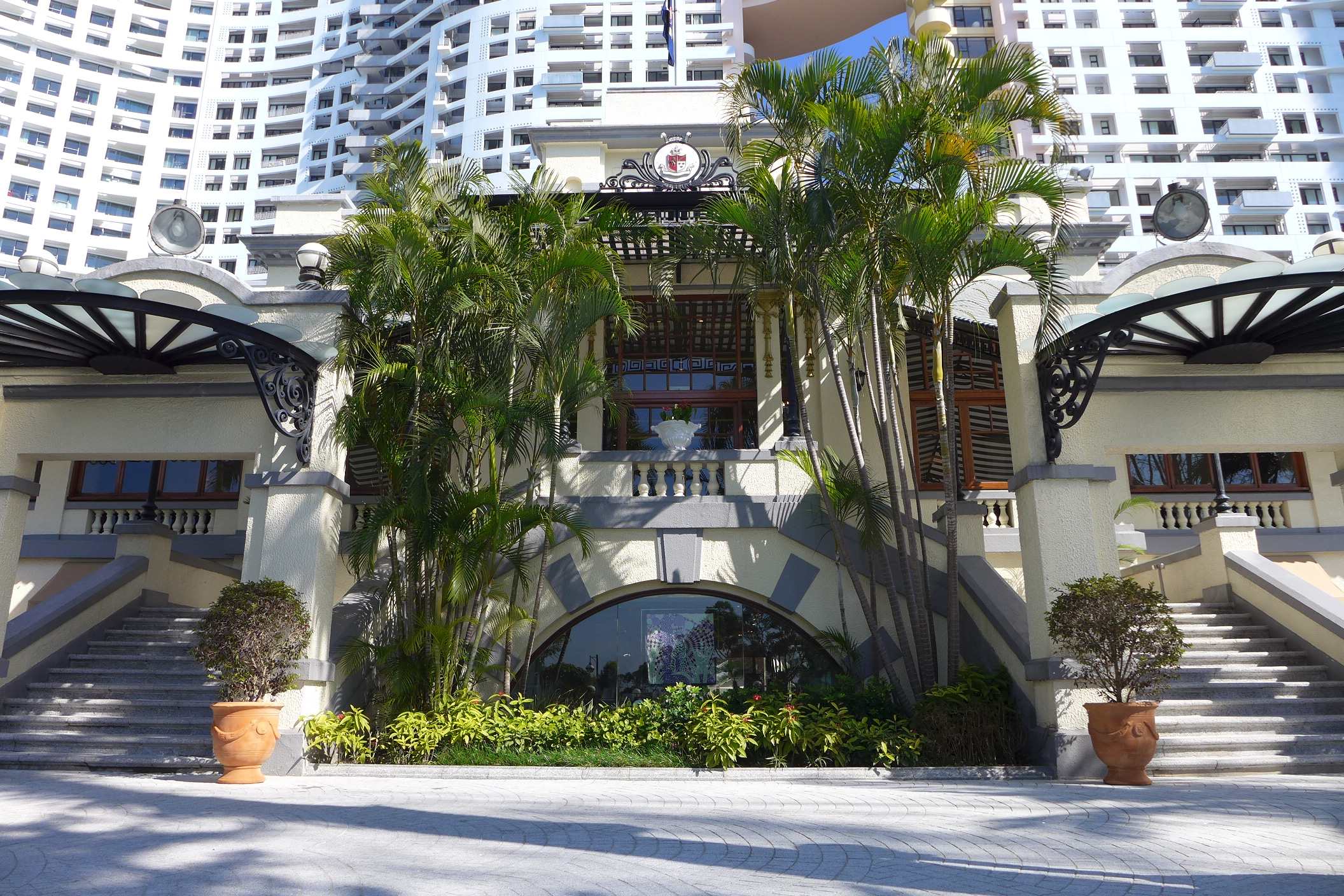
The Repulse Bay shopping mall was constructed on part of the old hotel site to mimic some of the lost colonial architecture

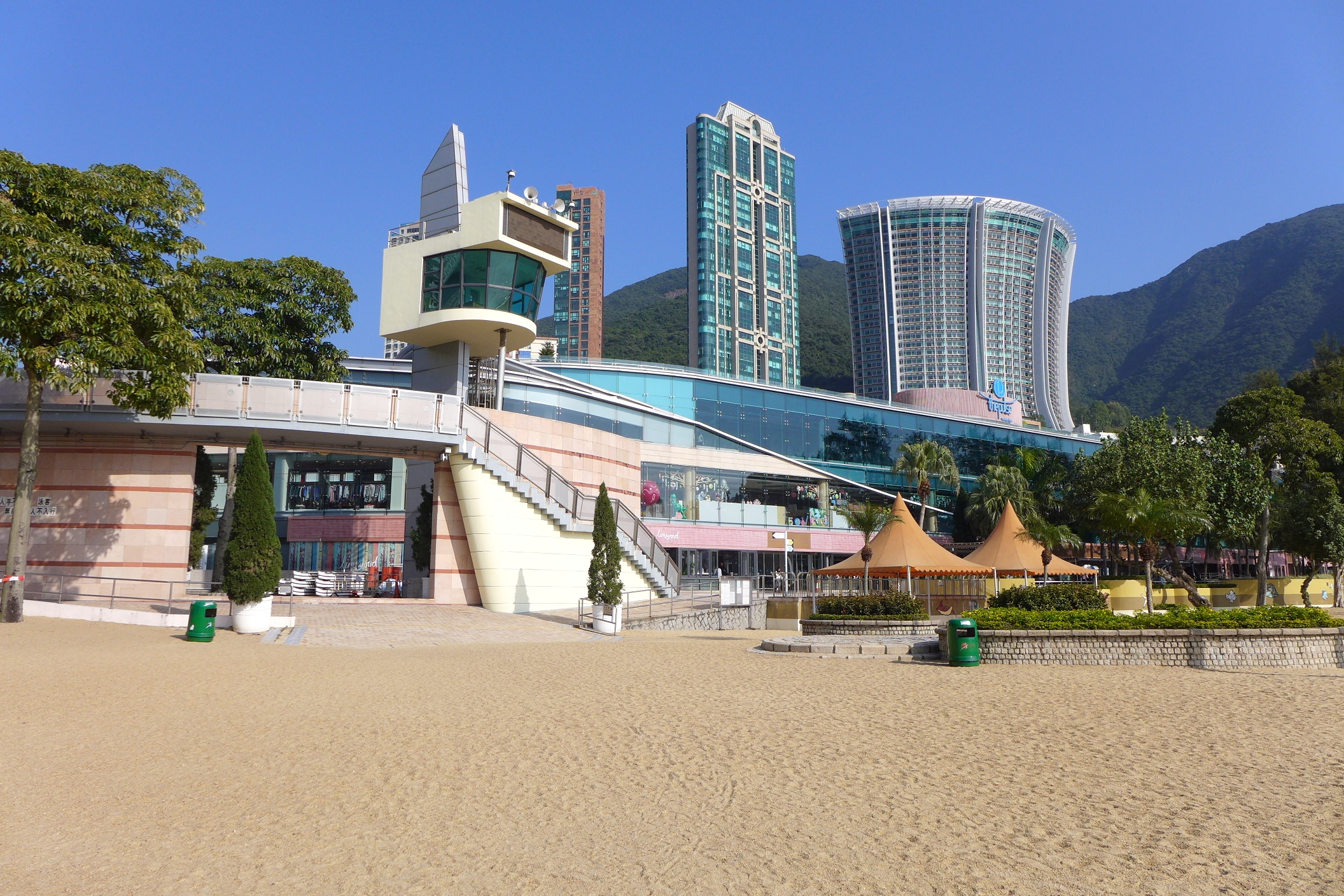
The Pulse is a new shopping mall completed in 2014

The Repulse Bay area is one of the most expensive housing areas in Hong Kong. Tencent's CEO Pony Ma bought a house there for US$57 million in 2014. In 2018, twin townhouses were sold for HK$1 billion (US$127 million) or about $970,000 per square metre ($90,000/sq ft). In 2018, Li Ka-shing, the richest man in Hong Kong, was living near Repulse Bay.

The former Repulse Bay Hotel was demolished in two stages during the 1970s and 1980s. Later a boutique shopping mall was constructed on part of the old hotel site to mimic some of the lost colonial architecture.

Emperor International Holdings Limited bought Lido Mall at Repulse Bay and renamed it The Pulse, but due to its expansion to five storeys and 13,300 m^{2} (143,000 sq ft), it was in negotiations with the government over the land premium. On 15 May 2012, Emperor announced an agreement with the government with the land premium at HK$798 million. Emperor would put The Pulse up for lease after receiving the occupation permit. The 13,300-square-metre (143,000 sq ft), five-storey shopping mall would be rented out at HK$50 to HK$60 per square foot. The Pulse was opened in 2016.

== Features ==
- Repulse Bay Beach
- Kwun Yam Shrine
- The Repulse Bay

== Transport ==
=== Road ===
Repulse Bay is served by Repulse Bay Road, which connects Wong Nai Chung Gap Road and Tai Tam Road. It is very convenient for people to travel to Repulse Bay as there are many bus routes reaching the bay. Visitors can take bus no. 6, 6A, 6X, 66 or 260 from Central, 63, 65 from Causeway Bay and North Point, or 73 from Cyberport and Aberdeen. The only cross-harbor bus passing through Repulse Bay is Route 973, originating from Stanley Market, crosses the harbor via the Western Harbour Crossing, and ends in Tsim Sha Tsui. Minibus 40, 52 are also available for visitors travelling from Causeway Bay and Aberdeen respectively. Transportation either passes through the Aberdeen Tunnel, or travels along the slightly longer scenic route.

Beach-goers may also opt to drive there. The beach provides some parking space on Beach Road, and the nearby Repulse Bay Hotel also has parking facilities.

=== Railway ===
There are no MTR stations in Repulse Bay, nor has any MTR project been proposed or commenced there.

== Education ==
Repulse Bay is in Primary One Admission (POA) School Net 18. Within the school net are multiple aided schools (operated independently but funded with government money) and Hong Kong Southern District Government Primary School.

The Hong Kong International School operates a campus in Repulse Bay at 23 South Bay Close. This campus hosts the Lower and Upper Primary divisions, containing Reception 1 (corresponding to kindergarten) through Grade 5.

== Cultural references ==
Author Eileen Chang's novel, Love in a Fallen City (傾城之戀) is set at the Repulse Bay Hotel.

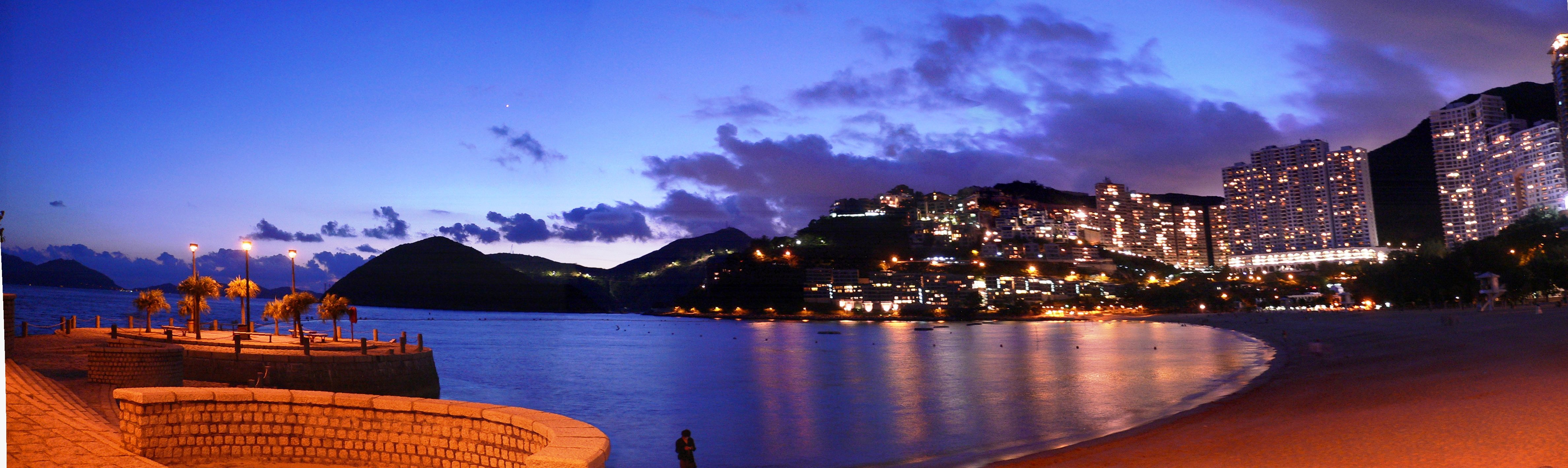
Repulse Bay at dusk.
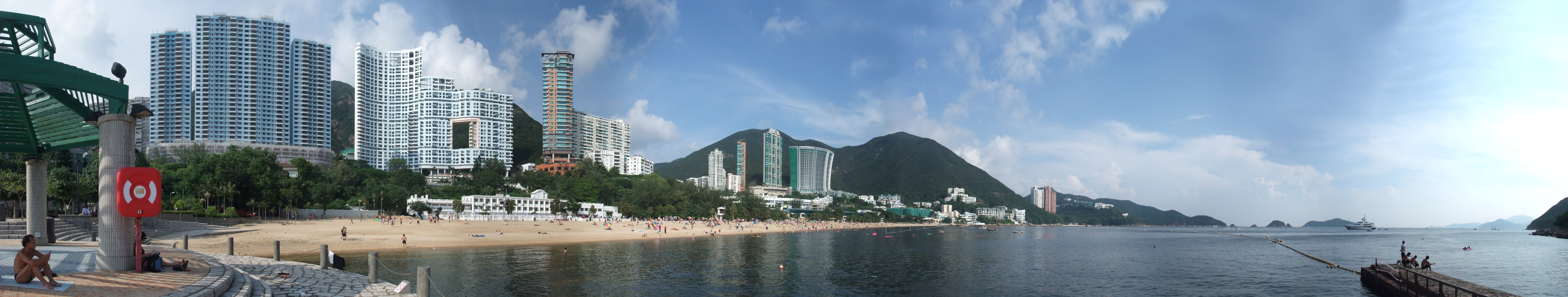
Repulse Bay
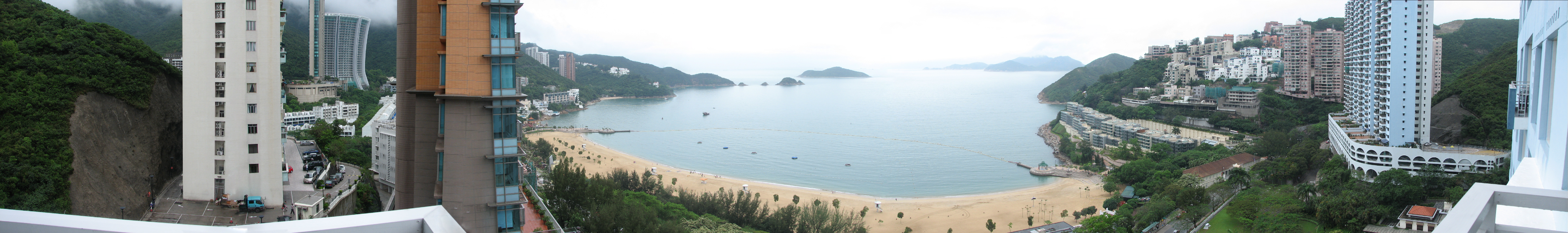
A panorama shot of Repulse Bay, as taken from The Repulse Bay, the "building with a hole" - featuring a full 180 degree view
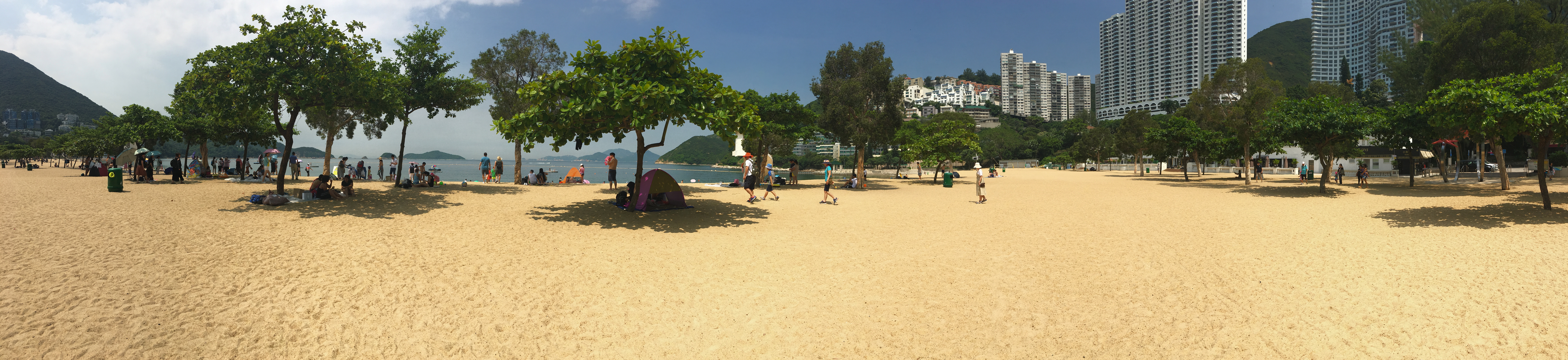
View of Repulse Bay Beach looking southwest

== See also ==
- List of places in Hong Kong
- Tourism in Hong Kong
