= Kwun Yam Shrine =

Taoist shrine in Hong Kong

Coordinates: 22°14′3.66″N 114°11′54.12″E

Kwum Yam Shrine (Chinese: 鎮海樓公園) is a Taoist shrine at the southeastern end of Repulse Bay, in the southern part of Hong Kong Island.

== Gallery ==
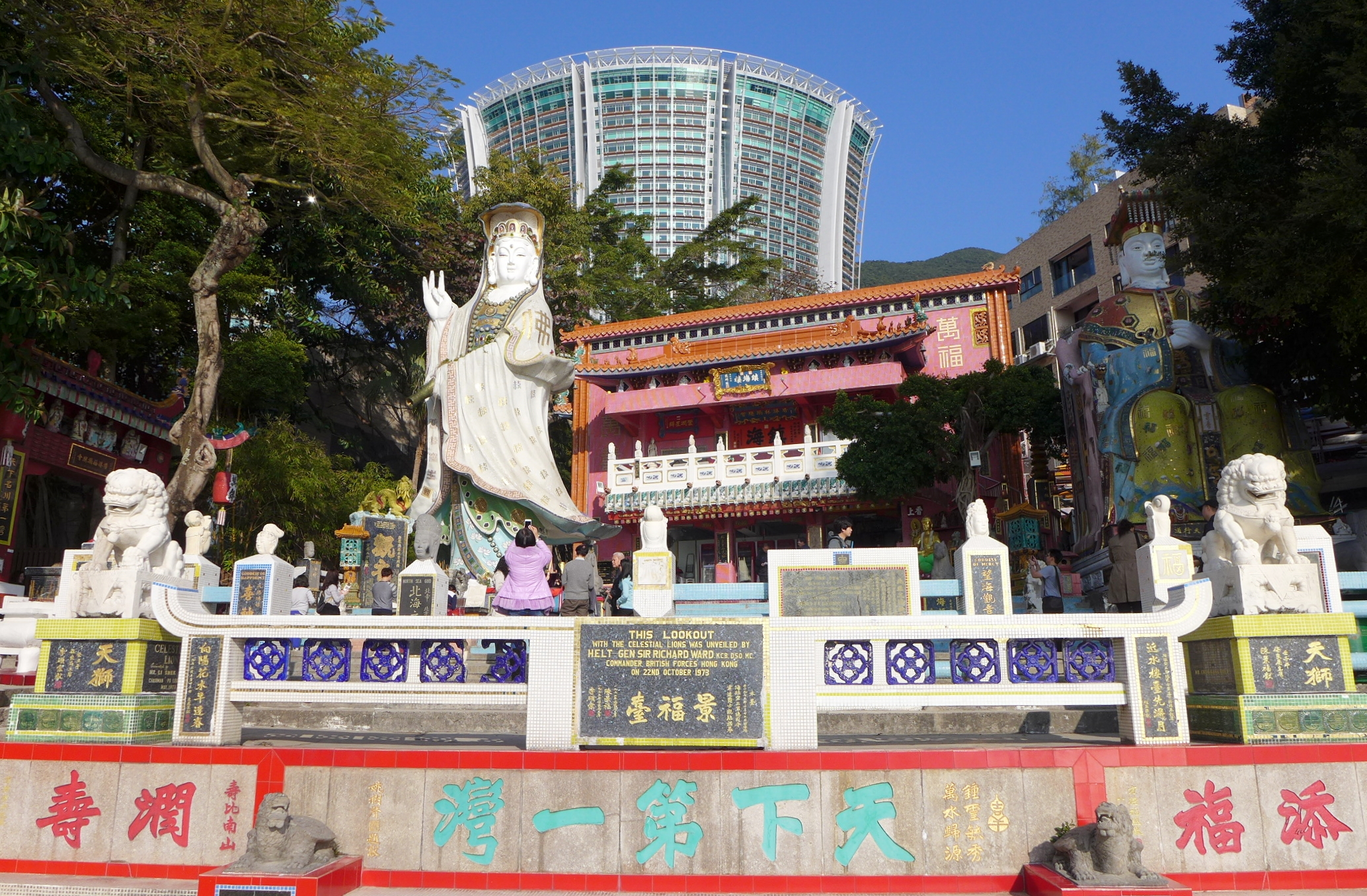
Statues of Kwun Yam and Tin Hau (Mazu)

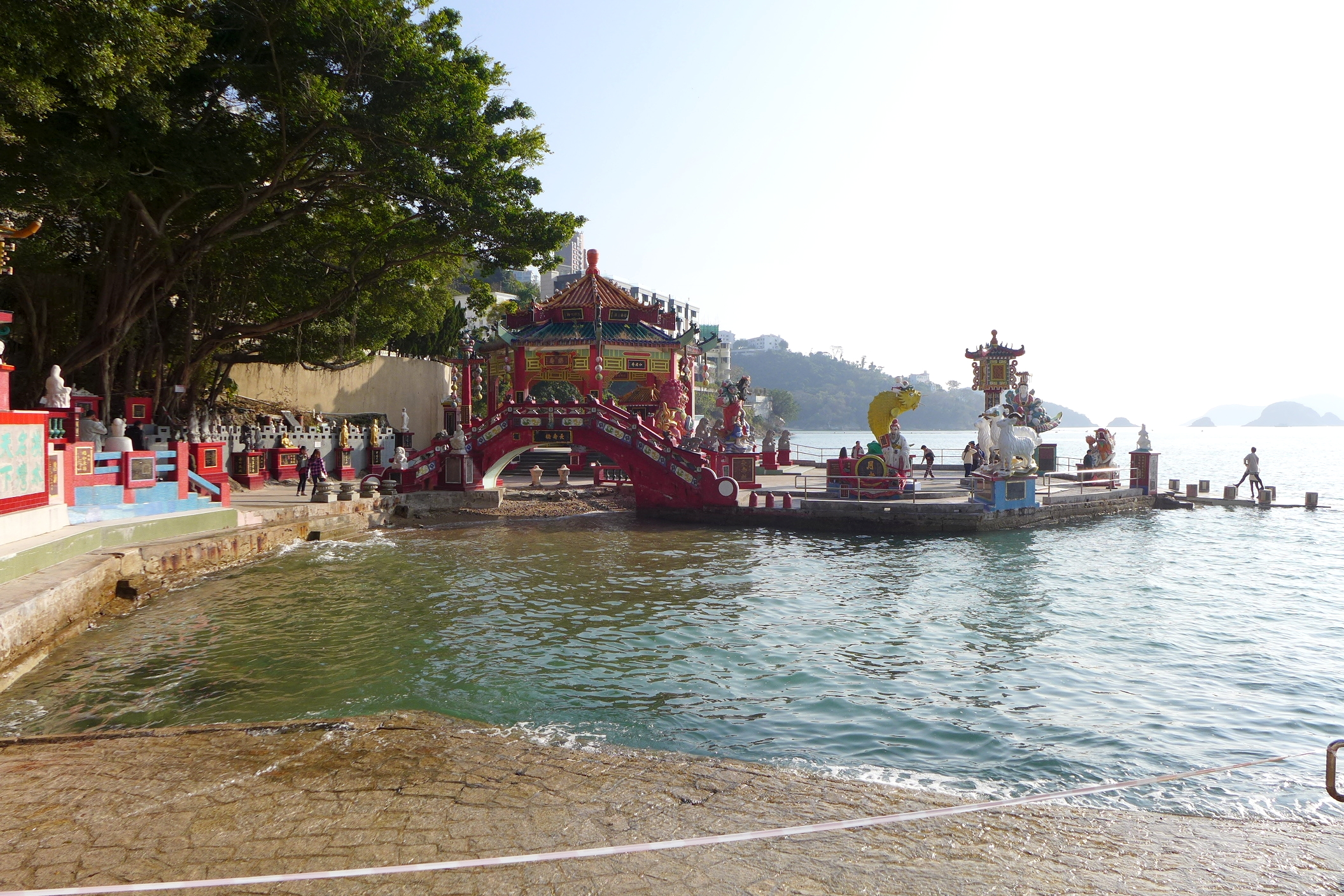
Eastern portion of shrine with Longevity Bridge (on left)

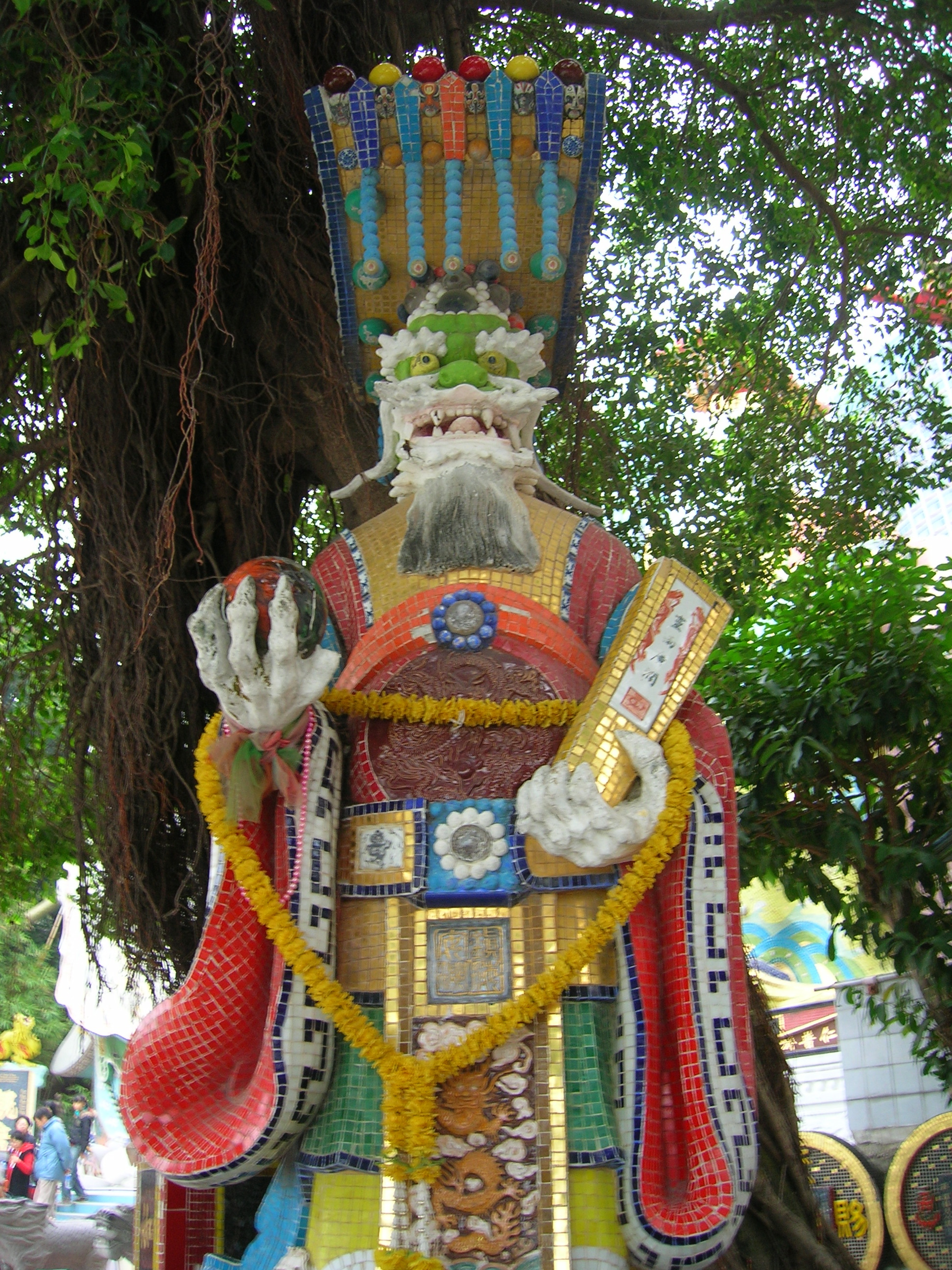
Mosaic statue of the East Sea Dragon King at Kwun Yam Shrine

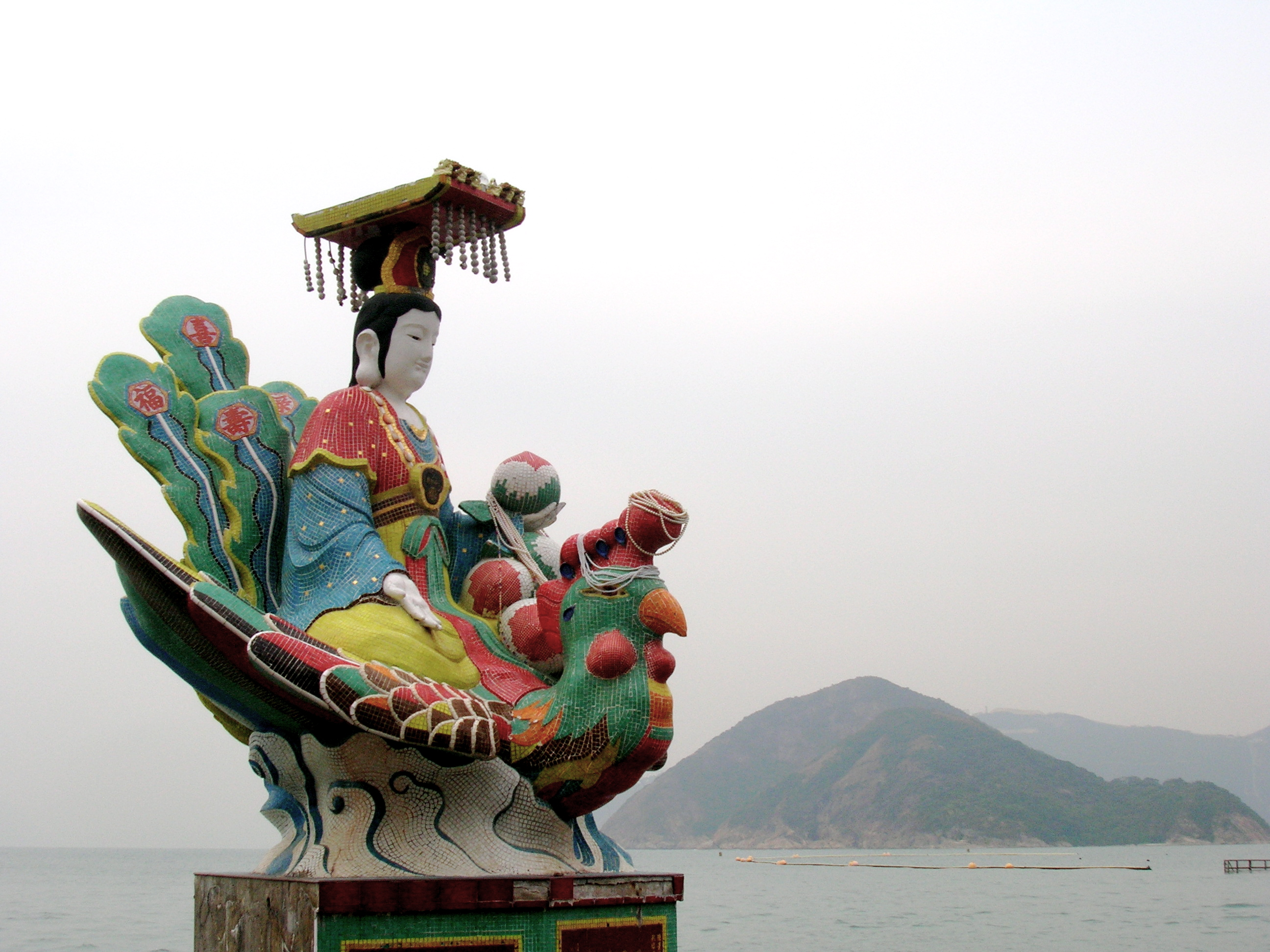
Mosaic statue of Tin Hau at Kwun Yam Shrine
