= Western Market Terminus =

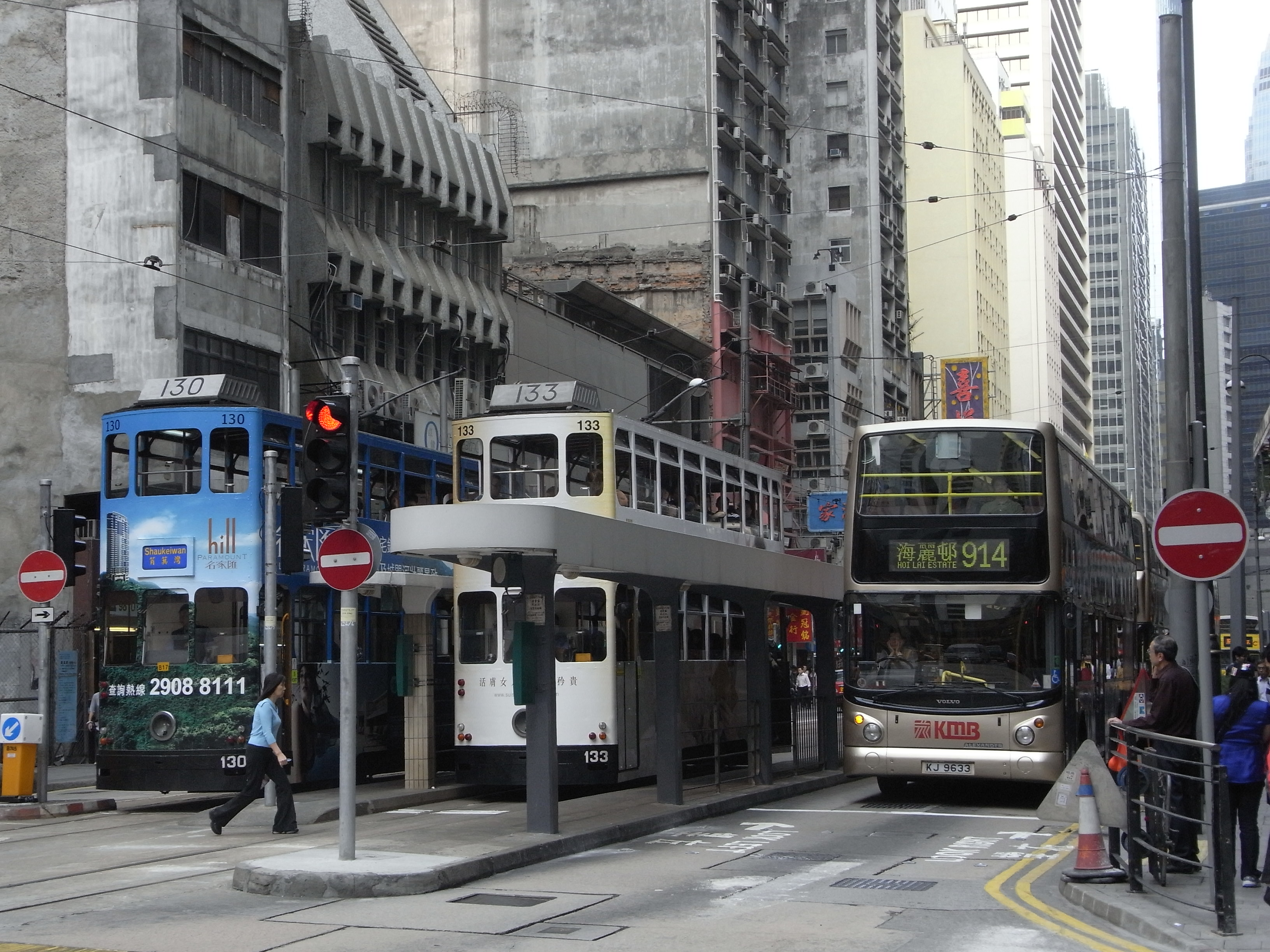

General information
- Coordinates: 22.2869°N 114.1507°E
- Owner: Hong Kong Tramways
- Platforms: 1 island platform 1 side platform
- Tracks: 2

Services
Preceding stop	Hong Kong Tramways	Following stop
Macau Ferry Terminal towards Shek Tong Tsui or Kennedy Town	Hong Kong Tramways	Hillier Street towards Shau Kei Wan
Terminus	Hong Kong Tramways	Man Wah Lane One-way operation
Location

Western Market Terminus (Chinese: 西港城總站) (formerly Sheung Wan Market Terminus) is a tram stop and one of the seven termini of Hong Kong Tramways, a double-decker tram system. Located in Sheung Wan, it is one of the system's three termini in the Central and Western District on Hong Kong Island. It is also one of the two termini for Hong Kong Tramways' sightseeing tram service, the other being Causeway Bay Terminus. Premium charter tram boarding and alighting also take place at this terminus. The terminus has two platforms; the southern platform serves westbound trams towards Kennedy Town or Shek Tong Tsui and the northern platform serves eastbound trams towards Shau Kei Wan. Eastbound trams originating from Kennedy Town Terminus or Shek Tong Tsui Terminus do not stop at this terminus; they use a separate track that bypasses it.

== Route ==
- Western Market ↔ Shau Kei Wan
