= Causeway Bay Terminus =

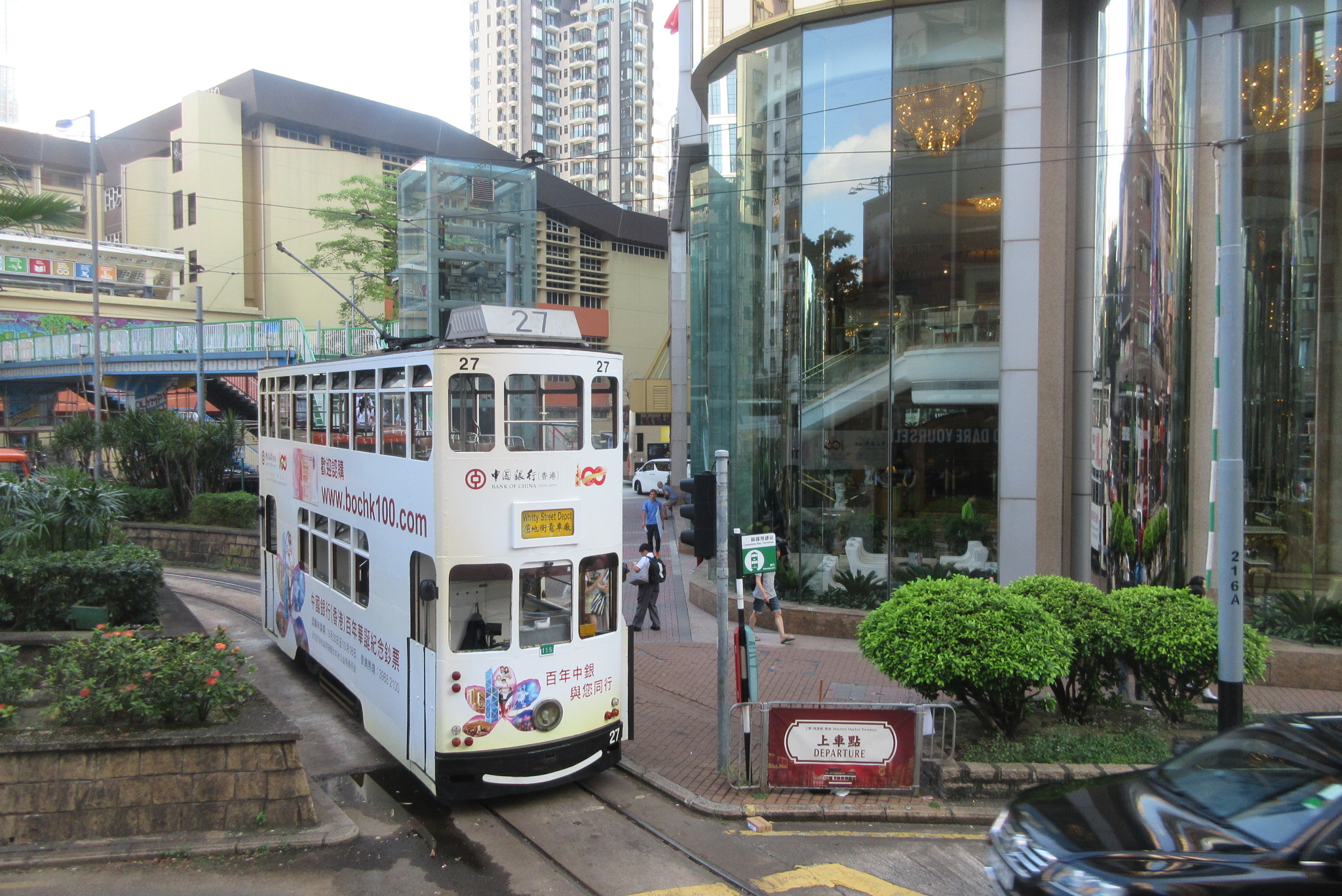

General information
- Coordinates: 22.2793°N 114.1871°E
- Owner: Hong Kong Tramways
- Platforms: 1 side platform
- Tracks: 1

Services
Preceding stop	Hong Kong Tramways	Following stop
Paterson Street One-way operation	Hong Kong Tramways	Terminus
Pennington Street towards Kennedy Town	Hong Kong Tramways	Terminus
Location

Causeway Bay Terminus (Chinese: 銅鑼灣總站) is a tram stop and one of the seven termini of Hong Kong Tramways, a double-decker tram system. Located in Causeway Bay, it is one of the system's two termini in the Wan Chai District on Hong Kong Island. It is also one of the two termini for Hong Kong Tramways' sightseeing tram service, the other being Western Market Terminus.

== Route ==
- Causeway Bay ↔ Shek Tong Tsui
