= Happy Valley Terminus =

Tram stop in Hong Kong

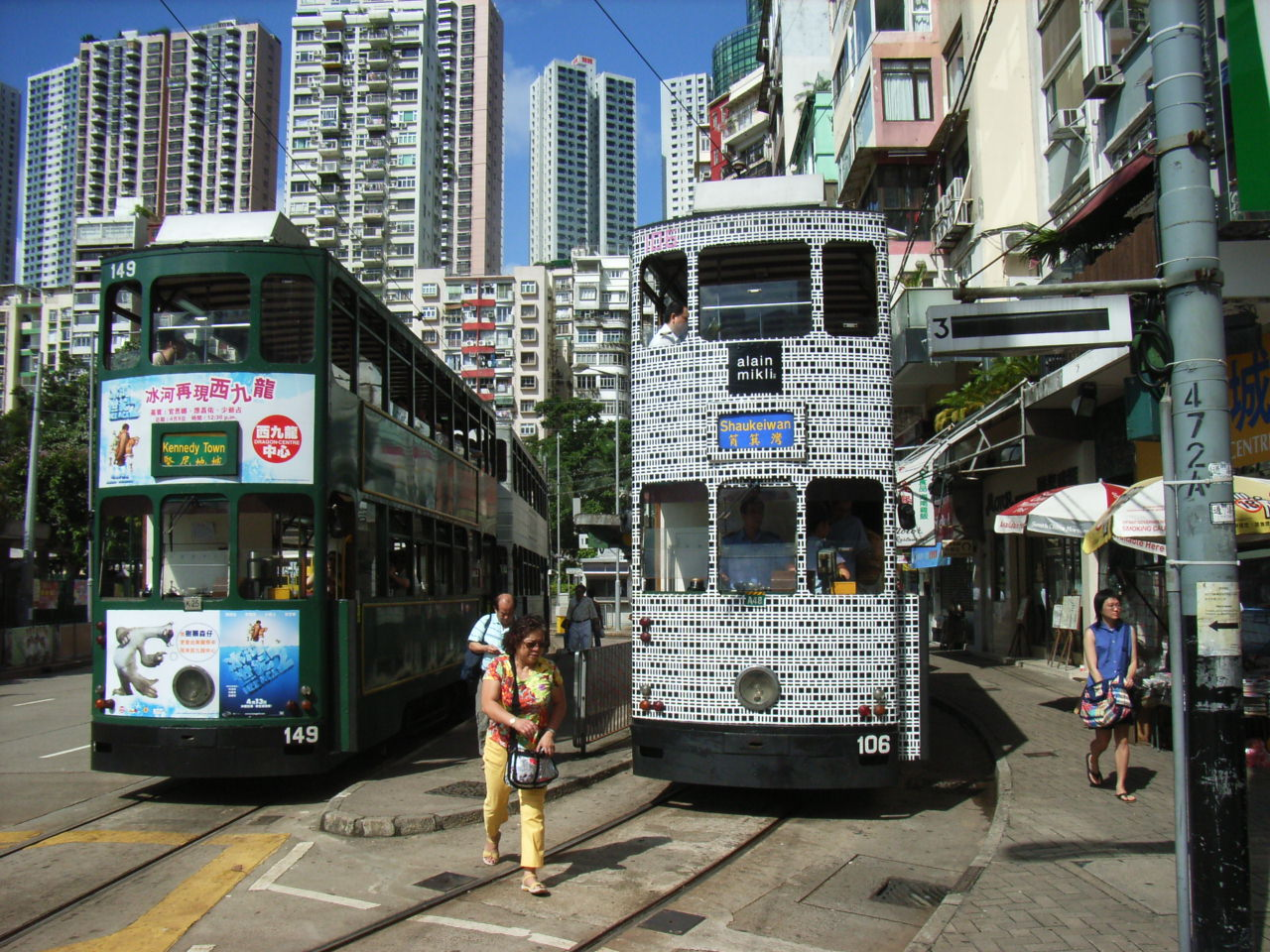

General information
- Coordinates: 22.2698°N 114.1842°E
- Owner: Hong Kong Tramways
- Platforms: 1 island platform
- Tracks: 1

Services
Preceding stop	Hong Kong Tramways	Following stop
Hong Kong Cemetery towards Kennedy Town or Shau Kei Wan	Hong Kong Tramways	Wong Nai Chung Road One-way operation
Location

Happy Valley Terminus (Chinese: 跑馬地總站) is a tram stop and one of the seven termini of Hong Kong Tramways, a double-decker tram system. Located in Happy Valley, it is one of the system's two termini in the Wan Chai District on Hong Kong Island.

== Routes ==
- Happy Valley ↔ Kennedy Town
- Happy Valley ↔ Shau Kei Wan
