= North Point Terminus =

Hong Kong Tramways terminus

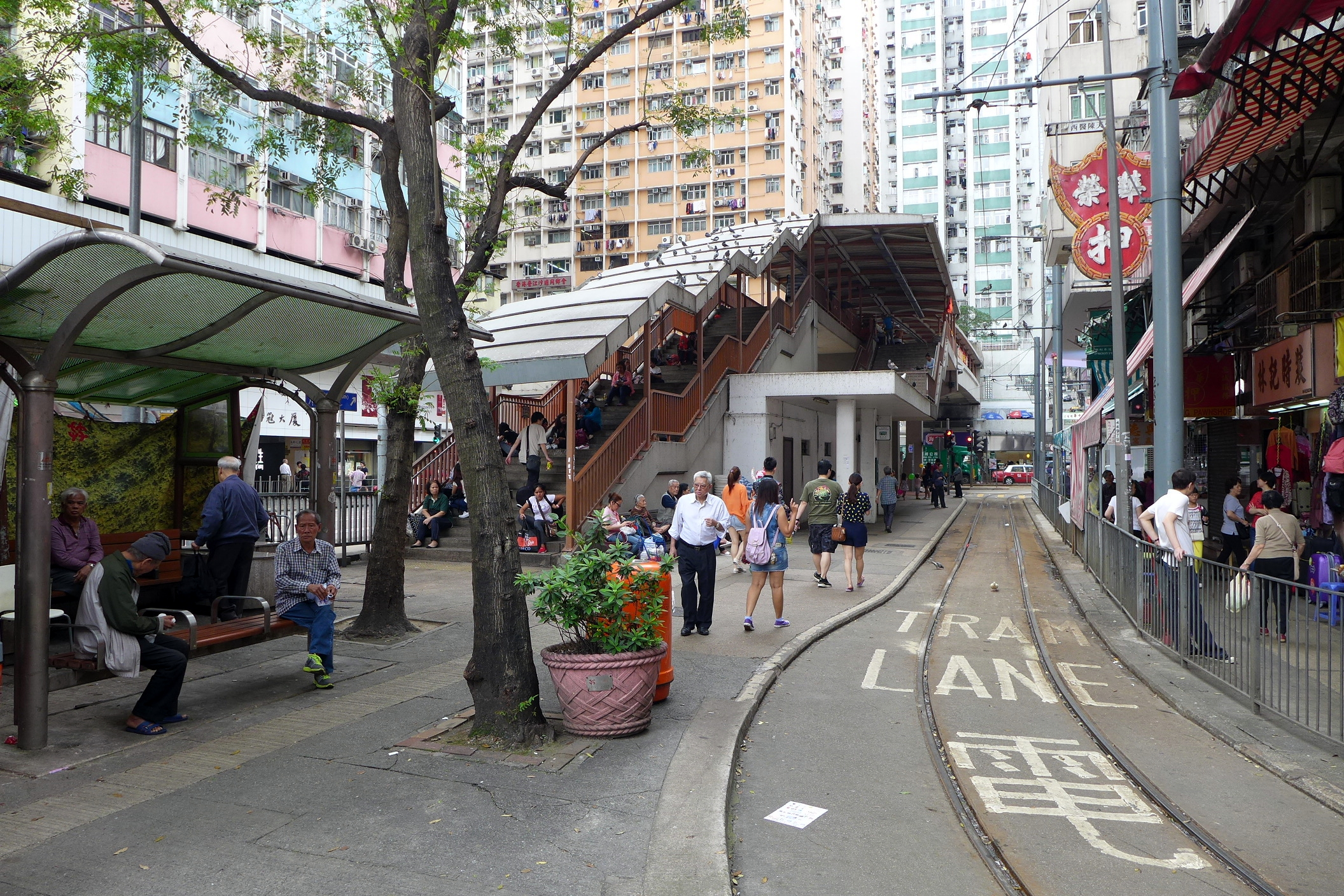

General information
- Coordinates: 22.2912°N 114.1987°E
- Owner: Hong Kong Tramways
- Platforms: 1 side platform
- Tracks: 1

Services
| Preceding stop | Hong Kong Tramways | Following stop |
|---|---|---|
| Chun Yeung Street One-way operation | Hong Kong Tramways | Terminus |
| North Point Road towards Shek Tong Tsui | Hong Kong Tramways | Terminus |
Location

North Point Terminus (Chinese: 北角總站) is a tram stop and one of the seven termini of Hong Kong Tramways, a double-decker tram system. Located in North Point, it is one of the system's two termini in the Eastern District on Hong Kong Island.

== History ==
The terminus opened on 21 December 1953, replacing the old Causeway Bay terminus. All trams that originally had Causeway Bay as their terminus switched to this terminus.

== Route ==
- North Point ↔ Shek Tong Tsui

== See also ==
- Media related to North Point Terminus at Wikimedia Commons
