= Shau Kei Wan Terminus =

Hong Kong Tramways tram stop

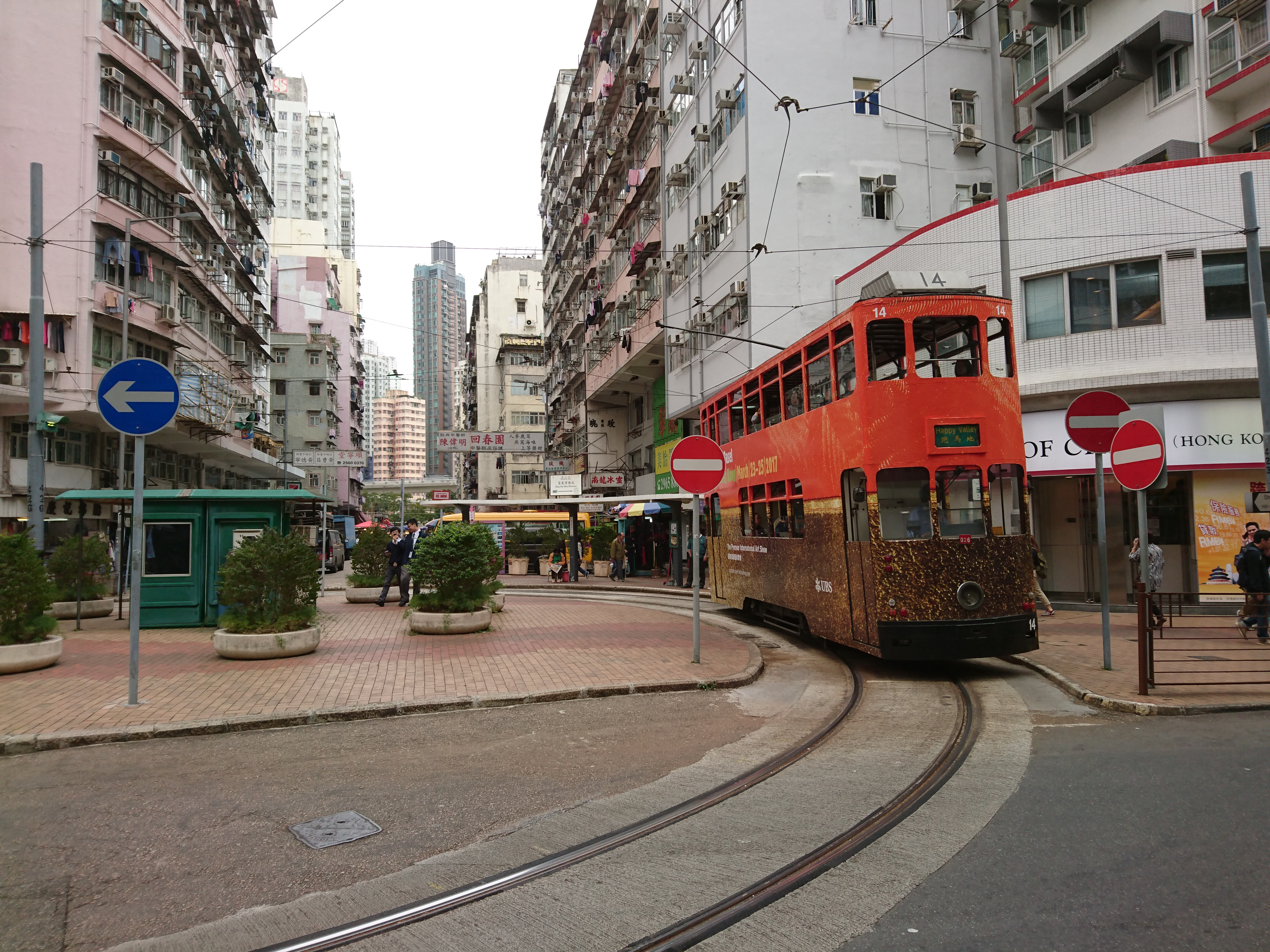

General information
- Coordinates: 22.2779°N 114.2301°E
- Owner: Hong Kong Tramways
- Platforms: 1 side platform
- Tracks: 1

Services
| Preceding stop | Hong Kong Tramways | Following stop |
|---|---|---|
| Chai Wan Road towards Kennedy Town, Western Market or Happy Valley | Hong Kong Tramways | Terminus |
Location

Shau Kei Wan Terminus (Chinese: 筲箕灣總站) is a tram stop and one of the seven termini of Hong Kong Tramways, a double-decker tram system. Located in Shau Kei Wan, it is the system's easternmost terminus, and one of its two termini in the Eastern District on Hong Kong Island. Shau Kei Wan station of the MTR Island line is near this stop and is accessible via exit C.

== History ==
When the tram system opened in 1904, the Shau Kei Wan Terminal was located at the current junction of Shau Kei Wan Road and Chai Wan Road. It was moved to the current site after the extension of the tram line in 1929.

== Routes ==
- Shau Kei Wan ↔ Happy Valley
- Shau Kei Wan ↔ Western Market
- Shau Kei Wan ↔ Kennedy Town
