= Hong Kong Tramways =

Tram system

Coordinates: 22.2883°N 114.1377°E

Hong Kong Tramways 香港電車

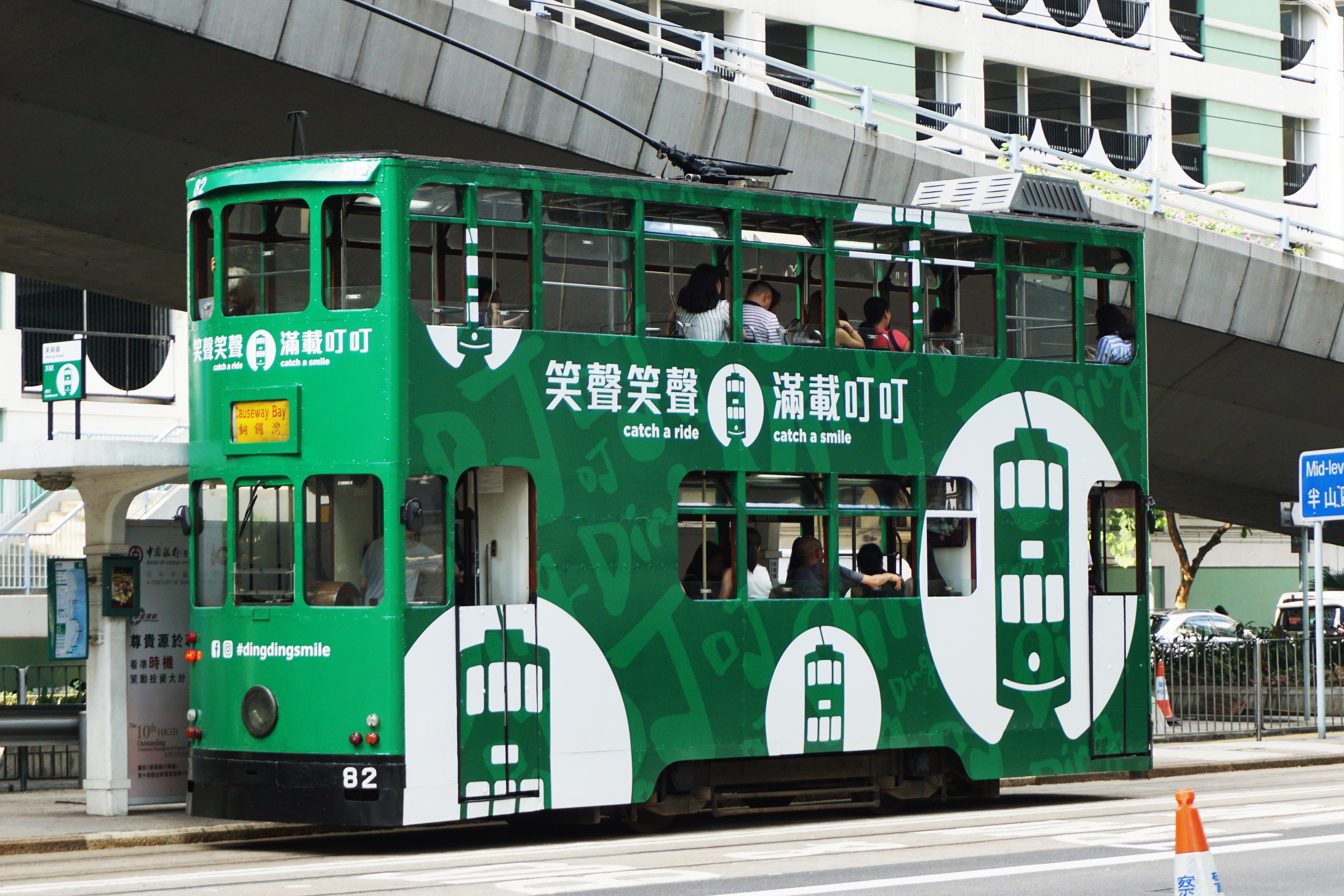
- A typical HKT double-decker tram

Overview
- Locale: Hong Kong
- Transit type: Tramway
- Number of lines: 1
- Number of stations: 120
- Daily ridership: 180,000 (2015)
- Website: hktramways.com

Operation
- Began operation: 30 July 1904
- Operator: RATP Dev Asia
- Number of vehicles: 165

Technical
- System length: Mainline: 13.3 km (8.3 mi) Happy Valley Loop: 2.6 km (1.6 mi) Total Track Length: 30 km (19 mi)
- Track gauge: 1,067 mm (3 ft 6 in)
- Electrification: 550 V DC (Overhead line, collected by a single trolley pole)

Hong Kong Tramways (HKT) is a 3 ft 6 in (1,067 mm) narrow-gauge tram system in Hong Kong. Owned and operated by RATP Dev Asia, the tramway runs on Hong Kong Island between Kennedy Town and Shau Kei Wan, with a branch circulating through Happy Valley.

Hong Kong's tram system is one of the earliest forms of public transport in the metropolis, having opened in 1904 under British rule. It has used electric trams since its inauguration, and has never used horse or steam power. It owns the world's largest operational double-decker tram fleet, and is a very rare example of a tram system that uses them exclusively. In addition to being used by commuters, the system is popular with tourists, and is one of the most environmentally friendly and cheapest ways of travelling in the city.

== History ==
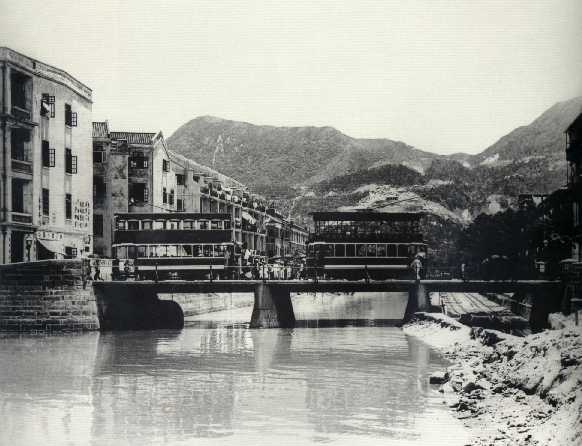
Trams crossing Bowrington Canal (now covered by Canal Road East and Canal Road West) in the 1920s

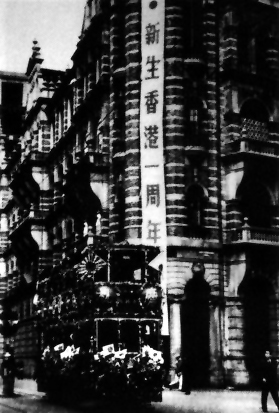
A tram in Central in 1942 during the Japanese occupation. The text in the background reads "First anniversary of reborn Hong Kong".

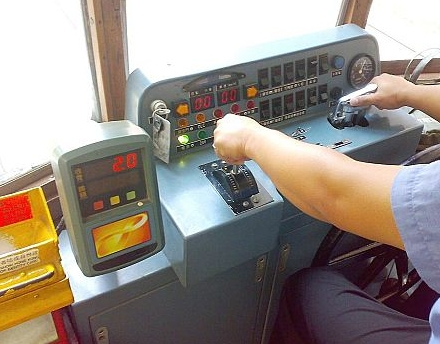
New tram driving panels were introduced in 2007

In 1881, Hon. F. Bulkeley Johnson, with the support of Ng Choy, proposed a Bill for the construction of a tramway system in Hong Kong. The following year, the Hong Kong Government published the preliminary Tramways Ordinance, which included six tramlines. However, the focus was primarily on the Peak Tram, which was of greater interest to the government and business interests residing on Victoria Peak, leading to the neglect of the tram proposal along Hong Kong Island.

Between 1883 and 1888, the population of Hong Kong increased from 173,475 to 215,800. The government hoped that the tram system would provide quick access to all areas of Victoria and reduce dependence on chair coolies. The bill underwent several readings and was finally passed on 23 May 1902, as the Tramways Ordinance (No. 10 of 1902).

In 1902, the Hong Kong Tramway Electric Company Limited was founded in London and came under the control of the Electric Traction Company of Hong Kong Limited by the end of the year. Track construction began in stages from Happy Valley, Causeway Bay to Shau Kei Wan in September 1903, and was connected westbound to Arsenal Street by August 1904. Regular tram service commenced on 30 July 1904, with twenty-six single-deck cars delivered in sections and assembled in the depot. These cars included ten combination cars with enclosed saloons and open ends and platforms, and sixteen crossbench cars. Fares for first and third class were ten cents and five cents respectively, with preferential fares for workers on workmen's cars from 1904 to 1909.

In 1910, the company name was changed to "Hong Kong Tramway Company Limited." Due to increasing ridership, ten double-deckers were introduced in 1912, featuring an open-top design with destination boxes and reversible seats on the upper deck. By 1913, open-top cars were fitted with canvas roofs for wet weather protection, and the first dividend was paid by HKT for the year 1912. The Happy Valley track was extended by 600 yards.

In 1914, the London Board was disbanded and replaced by a Hong Kong Board with local Directors. In 1922, HKT stopped generating its own electricity and obtained its supply from the Hong Kong Electric Company. The company name was changed to “Hong Kong Tramways Limited” (HKT). Wooden roofs were progressively fitted on tramcars in 1923, and double track construction between Causeway Bay and Shau Kei Wan commenced in 1924. Enclosed double-decker trams with a new green livery were introduced in 1925, along with a waiting room for first-class passengers.

In 1927, sided indicators were fitted on tramcars, and in 1928, HKT commenced operation on island and Kowloon buses. The Shau Kei Wan loop was put into service in 1929. The North Point Depot was under construction in 1932 and completed in 1938. Refuge islands were introduced at some busy tram stops in 1934 to increase passenger safety. Tram fares were reduced in 1936 to compete with buses, and during Coronation week in 1937, a million ridership was carried. Air brakes were fitted on tramcars in 1939.

During the Japanese occupation in 1941, limited service was provided, with one single-decker used for freight transport. Service was suspended in 1944 due to a fuel shortage. After the occupation, only 15 tramcars were operational out of 112. By October 1945, 40 tramcars were back in daytime service only. Tram service gradually resumed, with flat fares of 20 cents for first class and 10 cents for third class. The relaying of double track at Causeway Bay began in 1948, and in 1949, Car 120, the first new design constructed by HKT, entered service. The last single-track was replaced by double-track, and annual ridership exceeded 100 million.

In 1950, HKT rebuilt the entire fleet in collaboration with Taikoo Dockyard. The Russell Street Depot was rebuilt and renamed Sharp Street Depot in 1951. The Causeway Bay loop was closed in 1953, and the new North Point terminus was put into use. The first official route map was printed for passengers in 1954, and the North Point Depot was closed in 1955. New resilient wheels from Sweden were introduced in 1956 to improve riding quality. By 1959, all cars had half-drop windows for the driver.

Tram service was suspended under typhoon Ellen in 1961. The first single-deck prototype trailer was introduced in 1964, and the first tram overturned accident occurred. In 1965, ten additional trailers were ordered from the UK, designed to serve first-class passengers only. Service was limited to North Point due to the gradient at Taikoo Hill. A trolley reverser was installed at Causeway Road for emergency purposes in 1966. The last trailer built by HKT was withdrawn in 1978.

In 1969, a few experimental liveries were tested on tramcars. Female conductors were introduced in 1971. Class distinction was abolished in 1972, and passengers boarded at the rear and paid as they left (PAYL). HKT was acquired by The Wharf (Holdings) in 1974. The first full-body adverts were applied on trams in 1975. Fareboxes were installed at each tram front exit, and rotating turnstiles were fitted at the rear entrance in 1976. Trams were operated in one-man-operation (OMO), and conductors were no longer needed and shifted to become motormen.

Tram no.163, rebuilt from trailer 1, entered service in 1979. Trailers were withdrawn from service in 1982. Route maps were introduced on tram stops in 1983. Car 12 was exported for Expo' 86 in 1985. Tram refurbishment began in 1986, and the first tour tram No.28 was launched. The second tour tram No.128 was launched in 1987. The Sharp Street Depot was closed in 1989, and new depots were relocated at Whitty Street and Sai Wan Ho. Trial runs on overnight service began in 1990. A new built tram 120 replaced the 1949 prototype in 1991. Two HKT-built double-decker tramcars were exported to the Wirral Tramway in Birkenhead, England, in 1992. Points automation was introduced in place of points men's cabins.

In 1993, HKT built two maximum traction bogies for testing. Testing of pantographs on trams began in 1994. Double platforms were introduced at the Happy Valley terminus in 1995. The final year of The Most Attractive Tram Ads Competition was in 1997. Coloured destination blinds were introduced in 1998. HKT launched new "Millennium" trams designed and manufactured by its own engineering team on 24 October 2000. The Octopus electronic smart card payment system was introduced on trams in 2001. HKT celebrated 100 years of service in 2004. Route maps were reinstalled at each tram stop, and new tram driving panels were introduced on 7 November 2007. Air conditioning was installed on tour tram 128 in 2008.

In 2009, a 50% stake and operating rights were obtained by Veolia Transport RATP Asia, followed by full ownership in 2010. HKT launched Signature trams on November 28, 2011, featuring a combination of modern interior design and traditional outlook with LED displays, stops reporting, and AC motors. The NexTram passenger info system was launched in 2012. HKT proposed a modern light rail system for East Kowloon as a cheaper alternative to monorail in 2013. HKT celebrated 110 years of service in 2014. Following the opening of the West Island line of the MTR, daily tramway ridership dropped 10% to 180,000 in 2015. HKT provided real-time estimated time of arrival data to Citymapper in 2016, becoming the first transport operator in Hong Kong to do so. The first sightseeing car was launched in January, and the first air-conditioned car in June 2016.

In 2017, HKT rebranded with a new logo, new livery, and new map. The fourth party tram was launched in 2018. HKT celebrated 115 years of service with a series of events in 2019, including the introduction of the Bright Ring Tram. Day running lights were introduced on trams in 2020 for better night service, and Ding Ding Cat was employed as the tram ambassador. HKT achieved the Guinness World Record for the "Largest double-decker tram fleet in service" in 2021. A total of 10 fare free days were organized in 2022 with favorable responses, and new fares were applied on 11 July. In 2024, HKT celebrated 120 years of service.

== Practical information ==
- Fare – adult fare $3.30 (aged 12 or above), child fare $1.60 (aged 3 to 11 inclusive), senior citizen fare $1.50 (aged 65 or above)
- Operating hours – 5:30 am to 12:30 am
- Total length – 13 kilometres (8.1 mi) (Track length 30 kilometres (19 mi))

On average, the headway between each tram departure is approximately 1.5 minutes during peak hours. The maximum capacity of each tram is 115 people. Previously, the average tram speed was around 30 kilometres per hour (19 mph). Since early 2008, the speed of the trams was increased. The tram's general speed is currently around 40 kilometres per hour (25 mph). Most of the trams have a maximum speed of more than 50 kilometres per hour (31 mph), while some have a maximum speed of 60 kilometres per hour (37 mph). Hong Kong people informally call the tramway the "Ding Ding" and the trams as "Ding Dings", in reference to the double-bell ring used by the trams to warn pedestrians of their approach. Relative to buses and the subway system, trams are often the cheapest public transportation option.

=== Fares ===
As of 12 May 2025, HKT fares are $3.30 for adults, $1.60 for children, and $1.50 for elderly. Children under the age of 3 may travel for free. Unlike most forms of public transport in Hong Kong, HKT implements flat fare, which means the fare remains constant regardless of the distance travelled. There is also an option for monthly tickets, which cost $260 and are sold at the Shek Tong Tsui, Causeway Bay, and North Point termini at the end of each month.

Passengers pay upon alighting by either depositing the exact fare in coins into the farebox, using a credit card (Visa, Mastercard, JCB, UnionPay or American Express), mobile wallet e.g. Apple Pay, Google Pay, Alipay, or using an Octopus card. Turnstiles at the tram entrances and closed-circuit television are installed to prevent fare evasion by passengers.

=== Tourist services ===
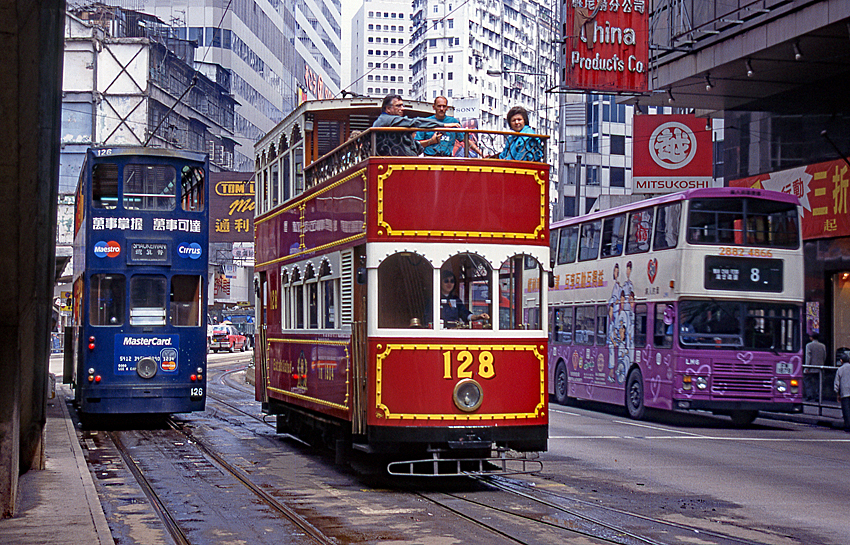
Tramcar No. 128

Sightseeing tours are available on antique-style tramcar No. 68, which has an open balcony and a historical exhibit on board. Sightseeing tram boarding and alighting take place at the sightseeing tour termini: Western Market and Causeway Bay.

Standard tramcars and antique-style, open-balcony tramcars No. 18, No. 28, No. 68, and No. 128 are available for private charter. Charter tram boarding and alighting take place at Whitty Street Depot, except for premium charter tramcar No. 18; its boarding and alighting takes place at Western Market Terminus.

== Routes and stops ==
Network diagram

The trams run on a double-track tram line built parallel to the northern coastline of Hong Kong Island from Kennedy Town to Shau Kei Wan, with a single clockwise-running track of about 3 km (1.9 mi) around the Happy Valley Racecourse.

There are seven overlapping routes:

- Kennedy Town ↔ Happy Valley
- Kennedy Town ↔ Shau Kei Wan
- Shek Tong Tsui ↔ Causeway Bay
- Shek Tong Tsui ↔ North Point
- Whitty Street Depot ↔ North Point
- Western Market ↔ Shau Kei Wan
- Happy Valley ↔ Shau Kei Wan

HKT currently has around 120 tram stops, including its seven termini. The termini, from west to east, are Kennedy Town, Shek Tong Tsui, Western Market, Happy Valley, Causeway Bay, North Point, and Shau Kei Wan. The stops are densely located, with an average interval of 250 metres (820 ft) between them. Several tram stops are located in the middle of the road on sheltered refugee islands, which are accessed by pedestrian crossings or footbridges. Track crossovers near the Davis Street, Eastern Street, Pedder Street, Admiralty MTR station, Gresson Street, Victoria Park, North Point Road, and Mount Parker Road stops are used in emergency situations, such as en-route traffic accidents. The majority of HKT stops have remained unchanged since their establishment, but some have had name changes. The Pedder Street stop was previously named Shu Shun Kwun (書信館), which referred to a now-demolished former General Post Office building.

Hong Kong Tramways termini

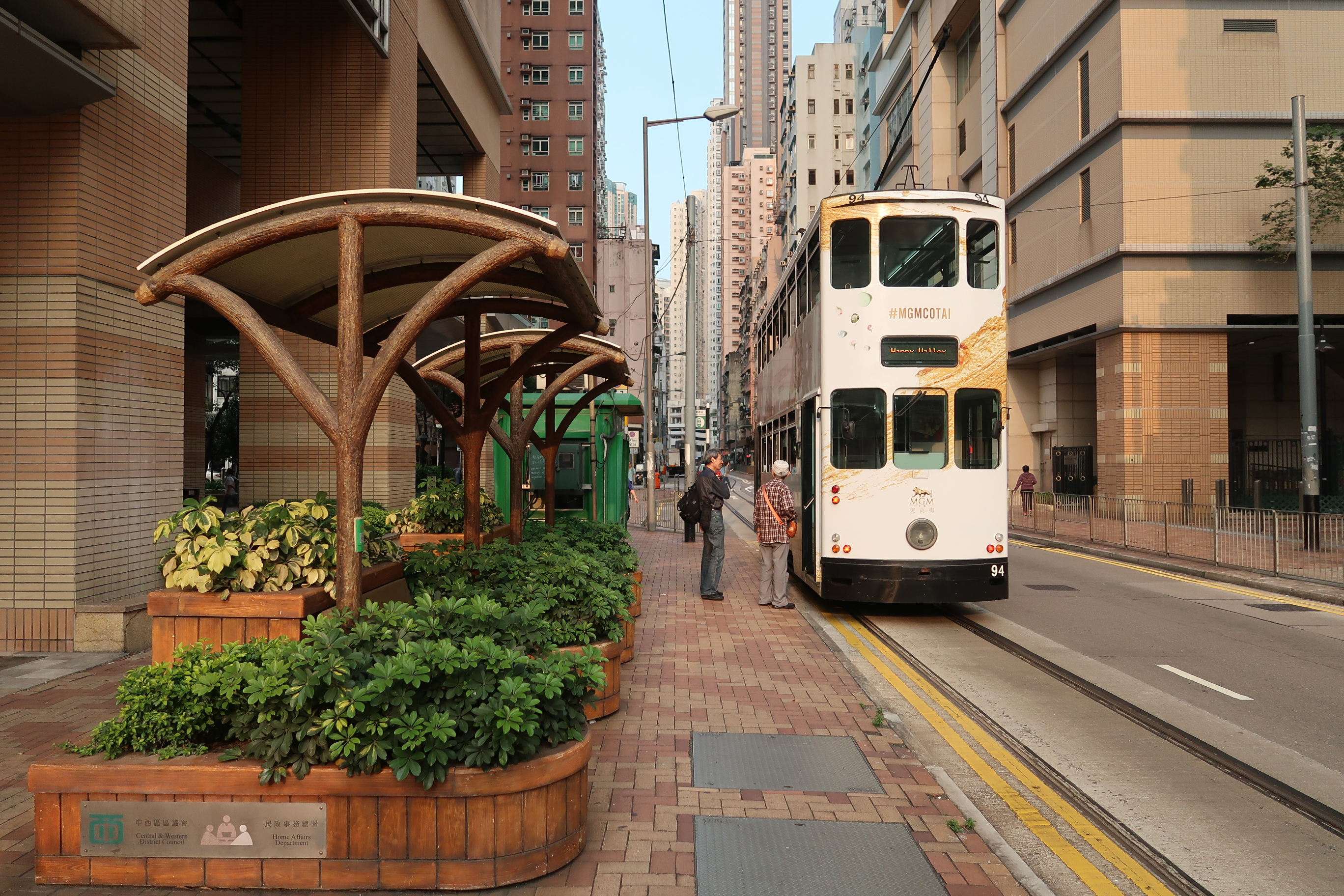
Kennedy Town Terminus

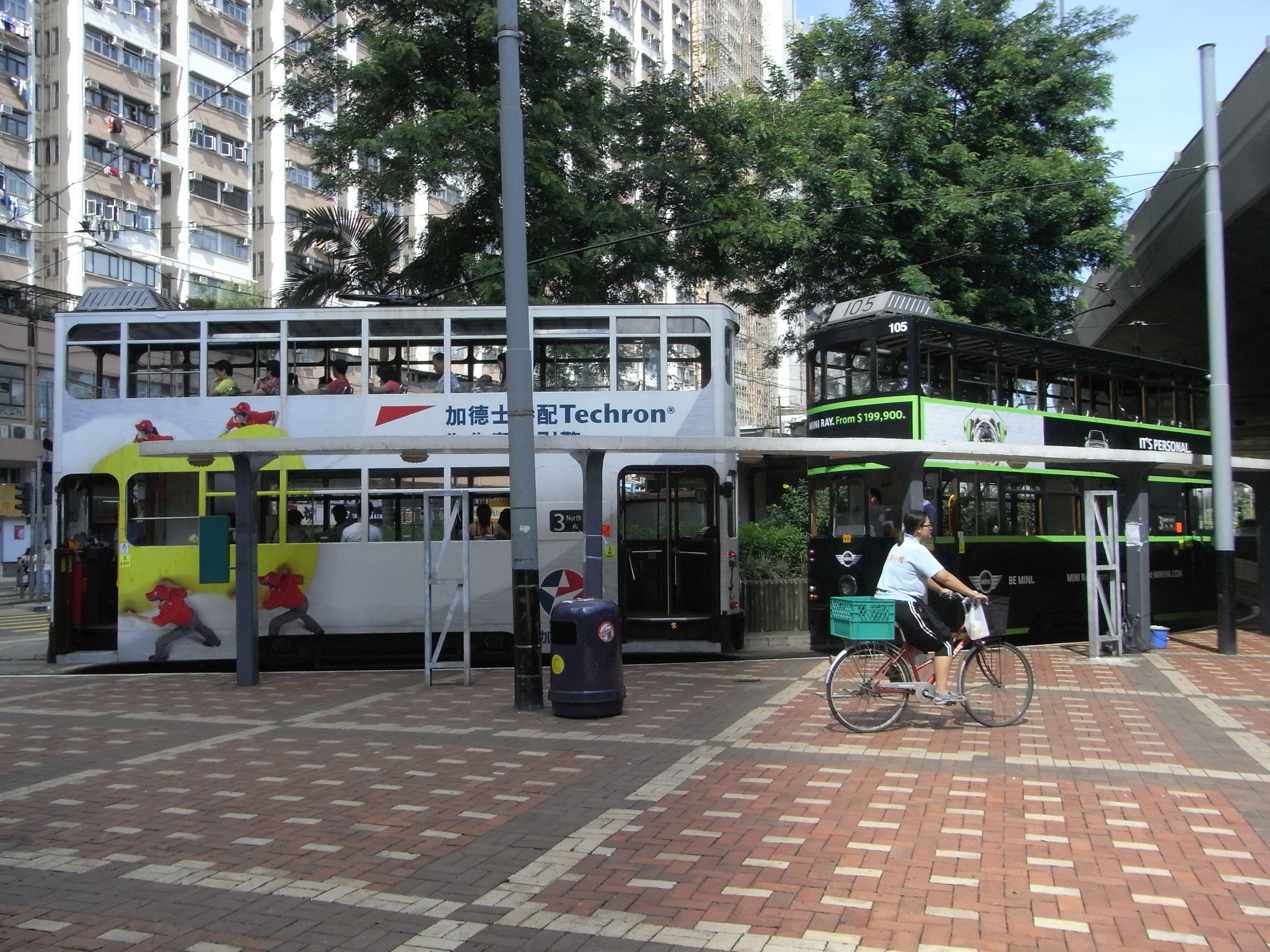
Shek Tong Tsui Terminus

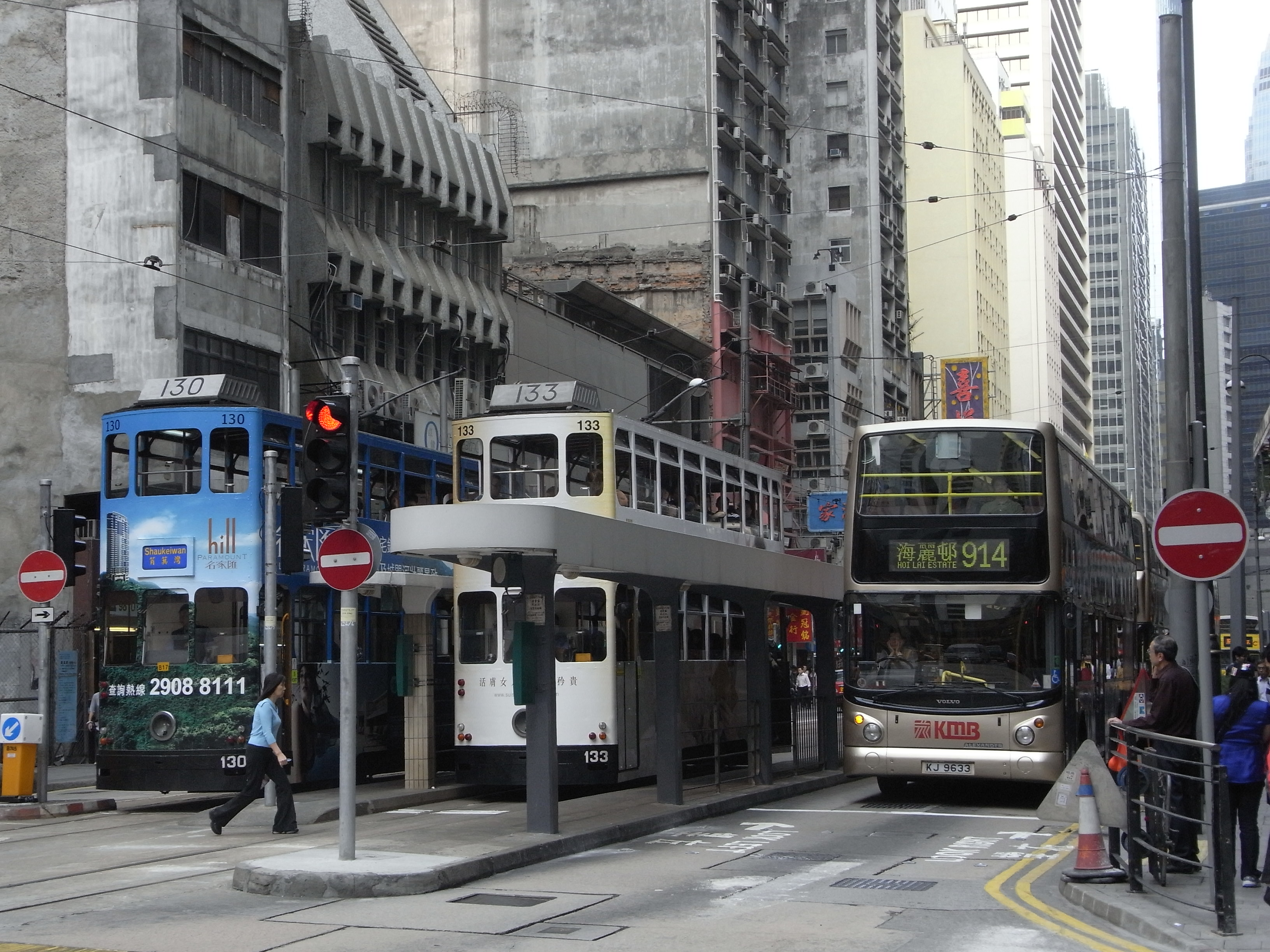
Western Market Terminus

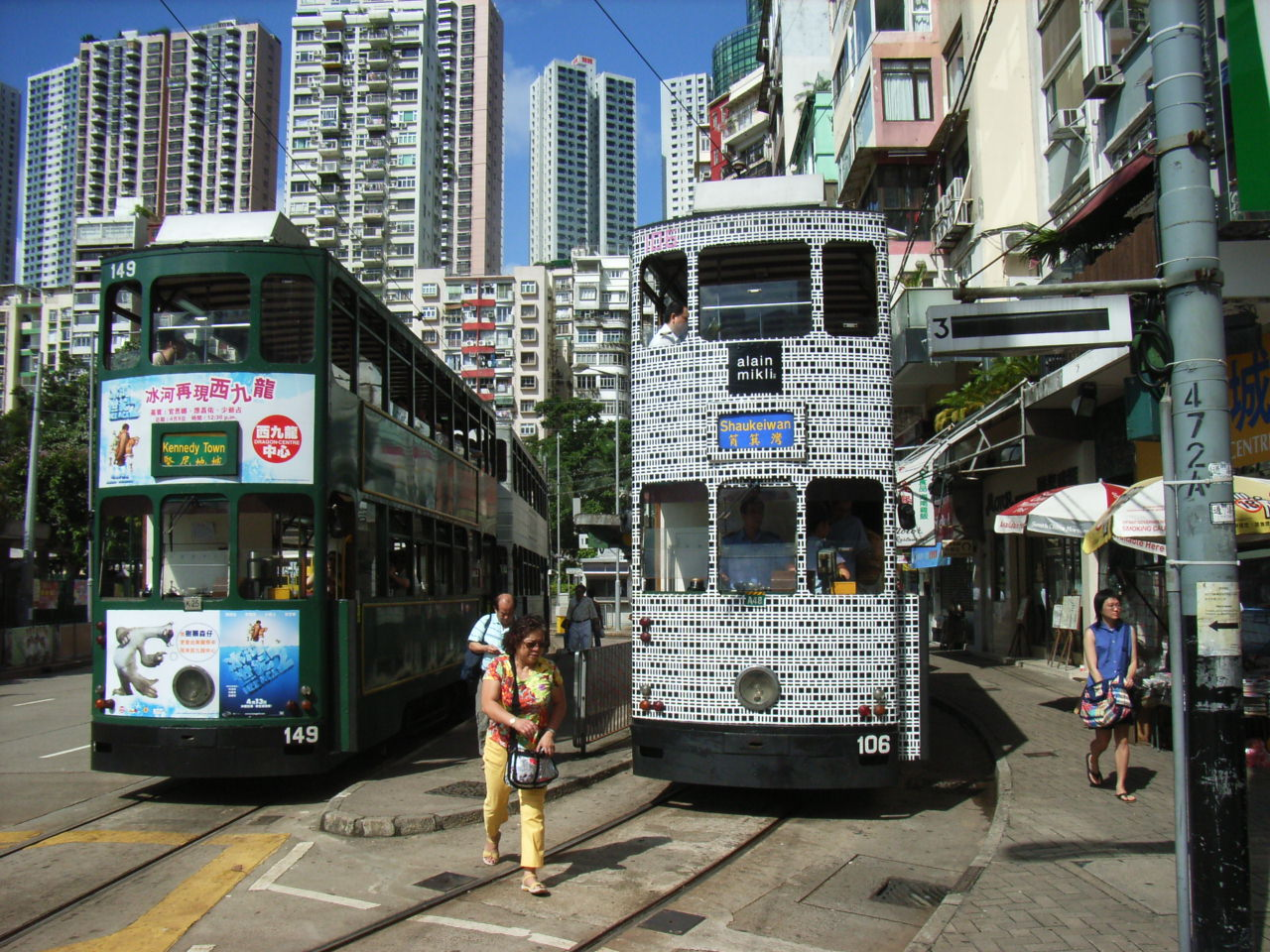
Happy Valley Terminus

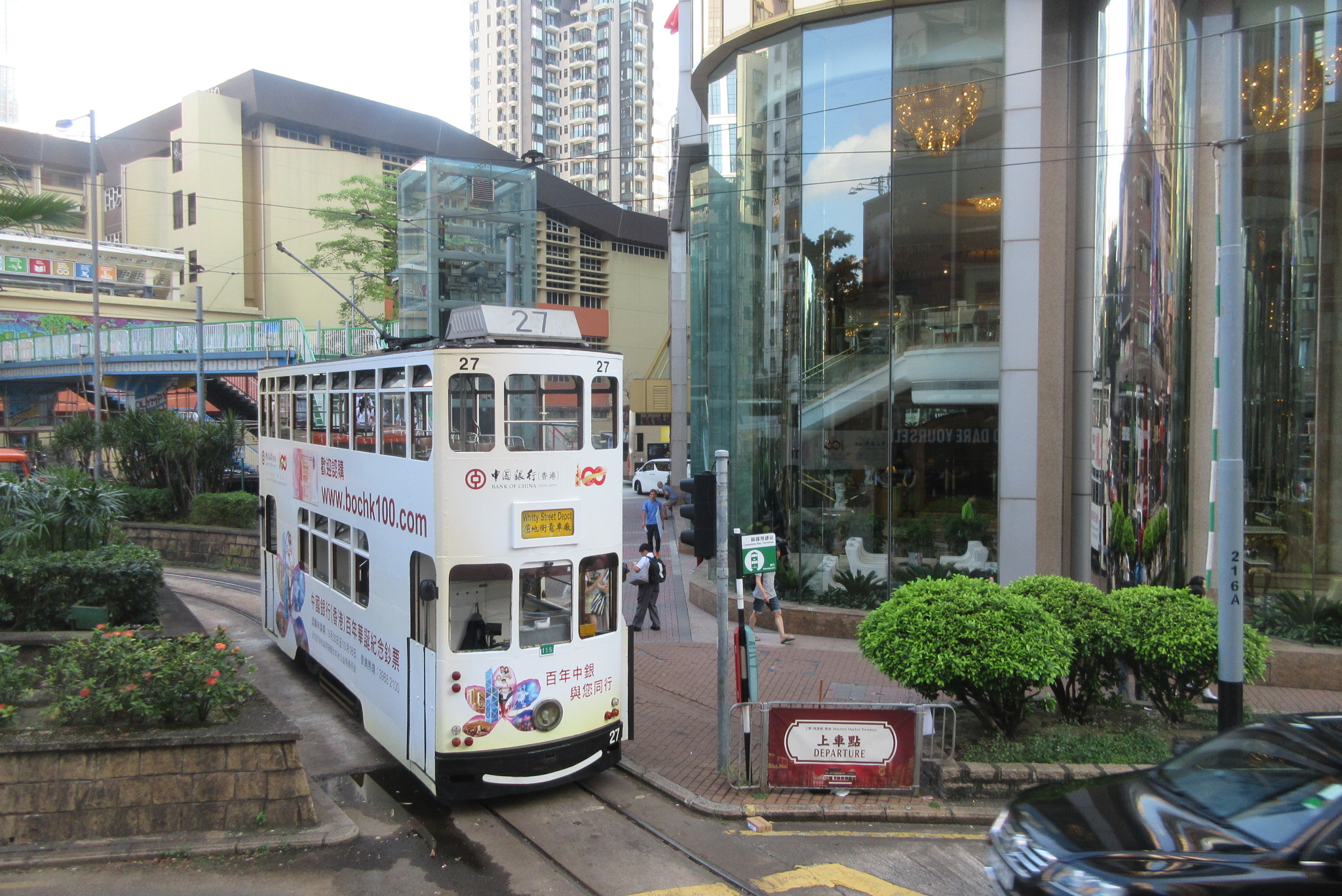
Causeway Bay Terminus

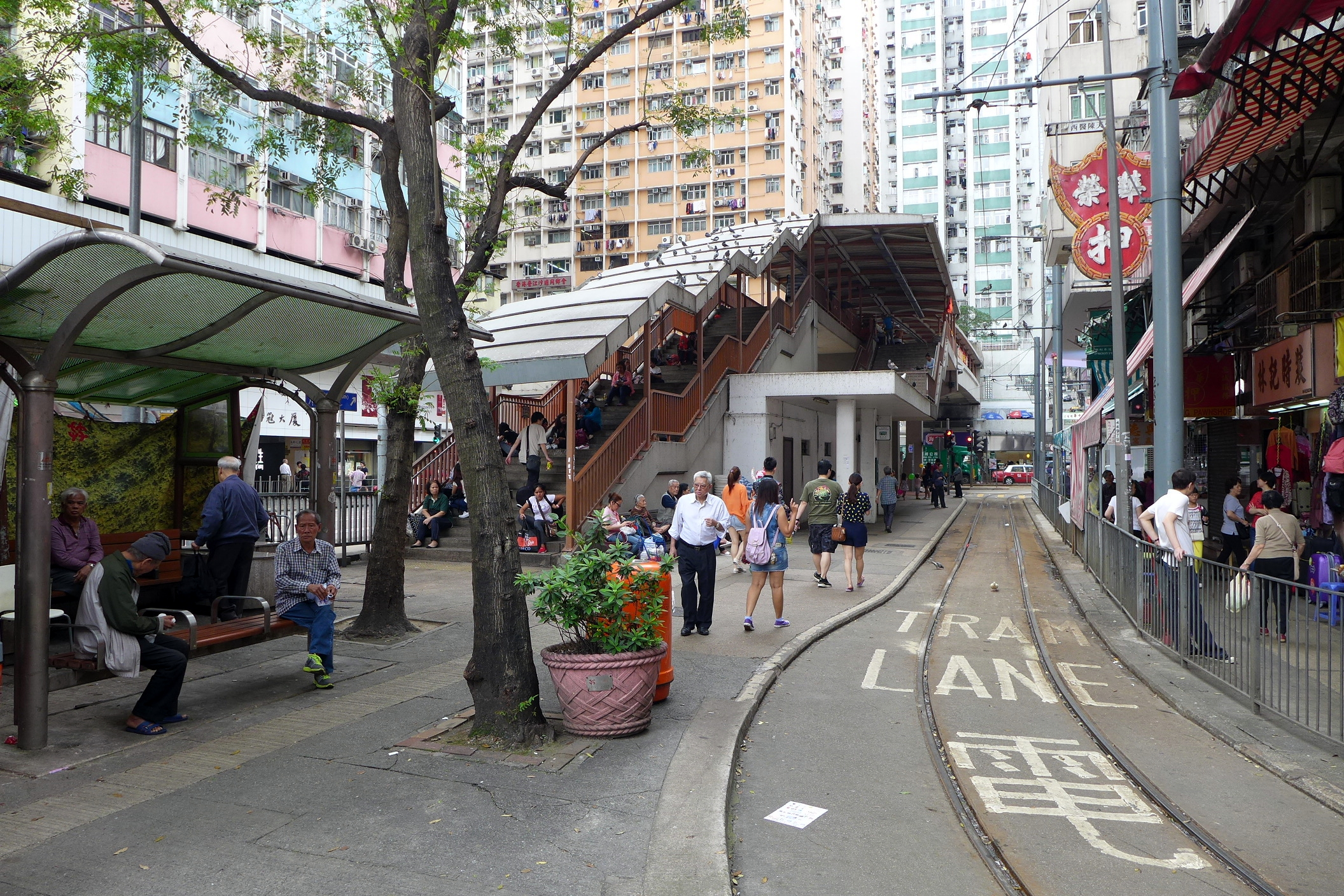
North Point Terminus

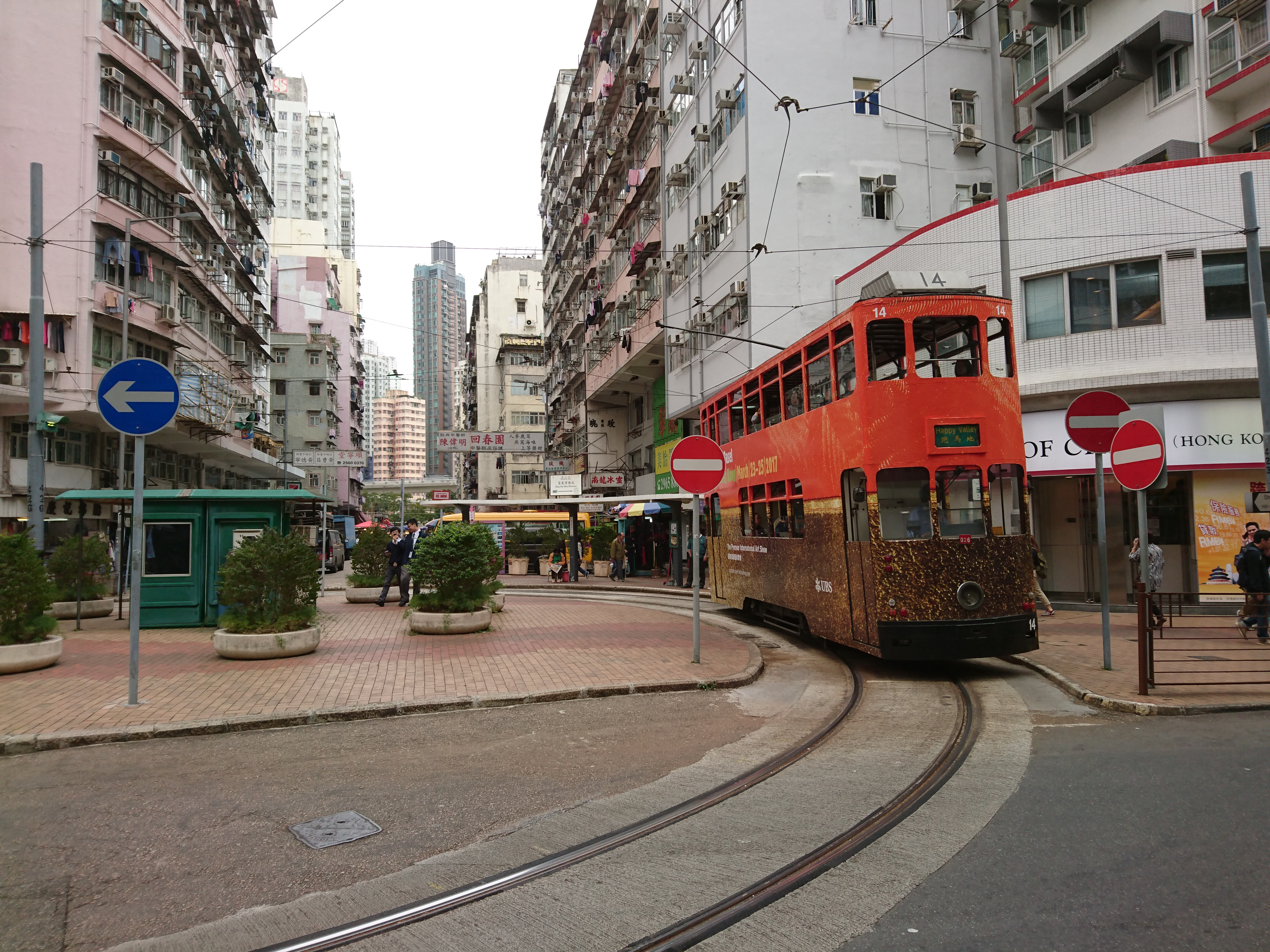
Shau Kei Wan Terminus

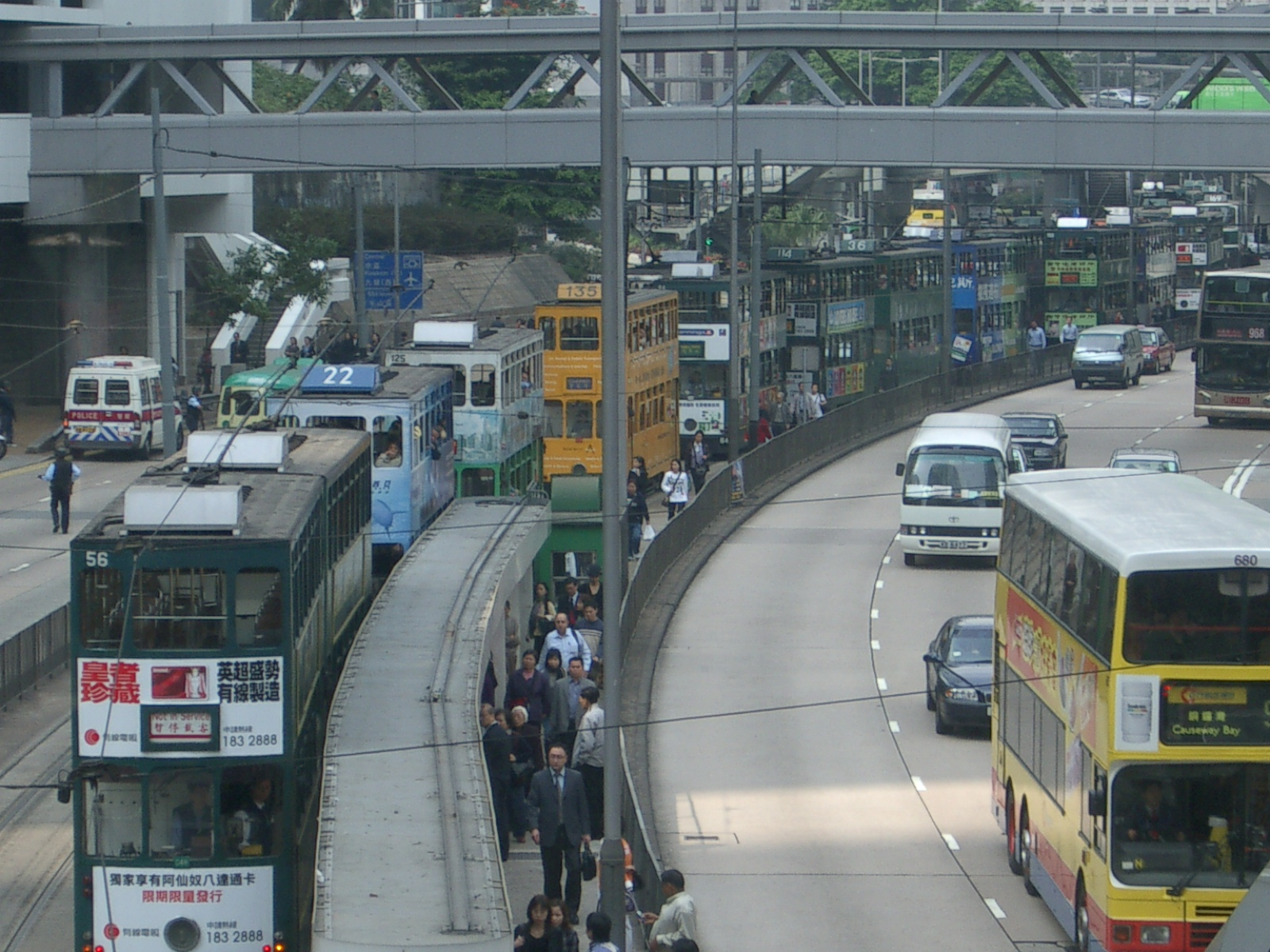
A broken-down tram may result in serious traffic congestion.

Most of the tram stops have dedicated platforms, albeit narrow, for passengers to wait for trams. However, 6 stops, namely Kennedy Town Praya, Hong Kong Cemetery, Wong Nai Chung Road, Nam Hong Street, Chai Wan Road, and the alighting stop of Shau Kei Wan Terminus, have no dedicated platforms and are instead located in the middle of the roadway. Passengers need to cross lanes for motor vehicles to board or alight from trams. Drivers of motor vehicles must stop behind the yellow 'stop' line at such stations and give way to pedestrians crossing to or from the tram, and must wait until there are no more passengers getting on or off the tram.

=== Interchanges ===
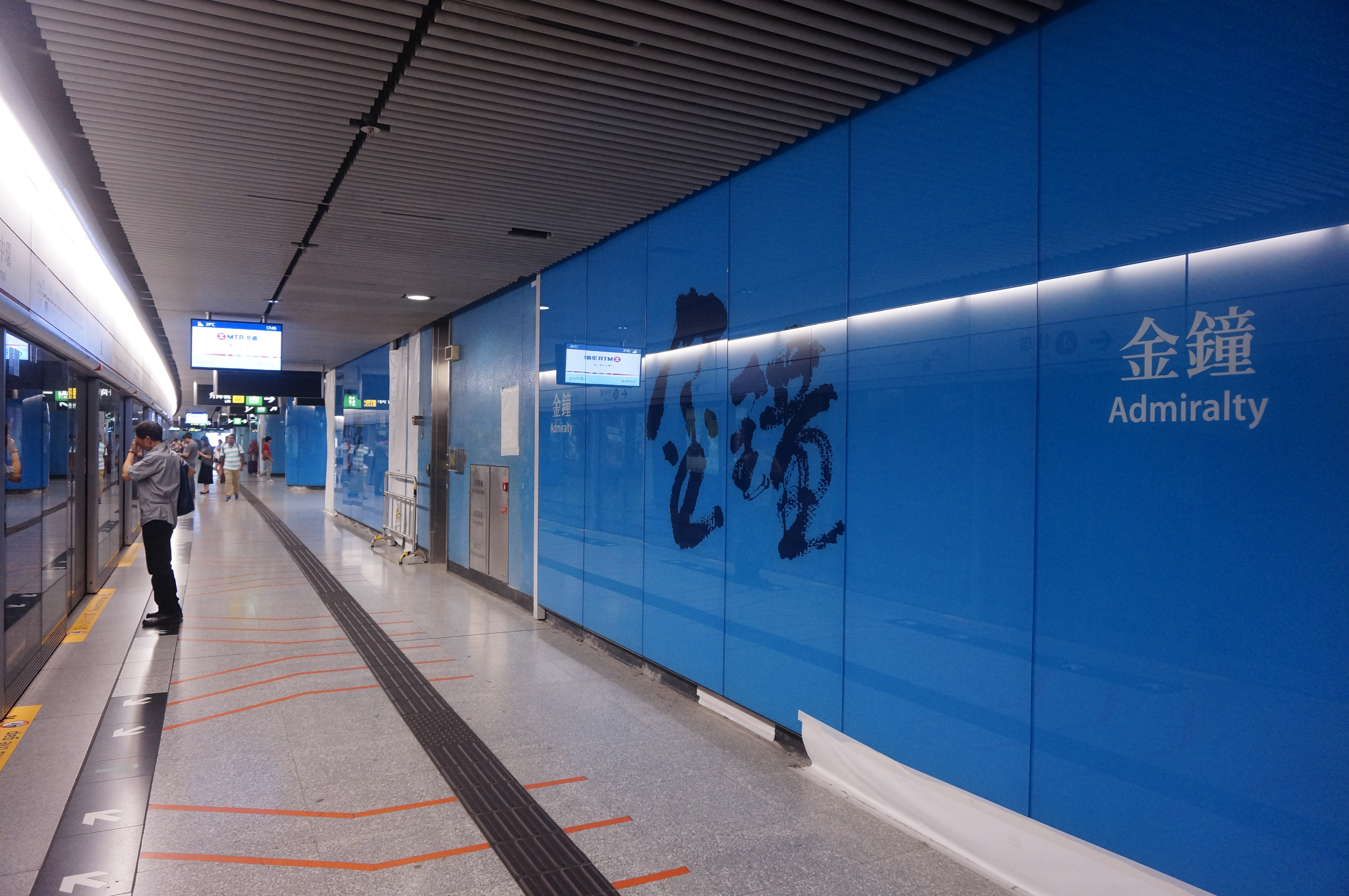
Admiralty station (platform pictured) is one of several MTR stations accessible from the tramway.

Hong Kong Tramways
- Traditional Chinese: 香港電車
- Simplified Chinese: 香港电车
Transcriptions
Standard Mandarin
- Hanyu Pinyin: Xiānggǎng diànchē
Yue: Cantonese
- Yale Romanization: Hēung góng dihn chē
- Jyutping: Hoeng1 gong2 din 6ce1
- IPA: hœ̂ːŋkɔ̌ːŋ tìːn tsʰɛ́ː

The Island line of the MTR is roughly parallel to the tram line between the Kennedy Town and Shau Kei Wan termini. Some sections of MTR tunnels are built directly under roads with tram tracks. Many HKT stops are near MTR stations.

Ferry terminals can be accessed from the tram line via footbridges, such as the Hong Kong–Macau Ferry Terminal and the Central Ferry Piers. The latter contains Star Ferry Pier, which is one of the stops for the Star Ferry.

== Fleet ==
HKT has a rare fully double-decker tram fleet. As of 2014, HKT owned 165 double-axle, double-decker trams. There are three maintenance-only trams (No. 200, No. 300, and No. 400) that operate after regular tram service has stopped. The trams are equipped with sliding windows and almost all have full-body advertisements.

Fleet list and details
Make/model
Description
Fleet size
Year acquired
Year retired
Notes
Photographs
Dick, Kerr & Co of Preston, England (No. 1–16, No. 27–36), and Electric Railway & Tramway Works of Preston (a Dick Kerr subsidiary)

(No. 1–16) first batch of third class tramcars (No. 17–26) first class tramcars (No. 27–36) second batch of third class tramcars

Single-deck tramcars – wood
36 (reduced to 18 in 1912–1913, and further to 14 in 1923)
1904–1905
1935

United Electric Car Company of Preston, England, and Hong Kong & Whampoa Dock Co of Kowloon

(No. 37–46) first batch double-decker tramcars

Double-decker trams – wood
28 (10 as new, 18 rebuilt from single-deck tramcars)
1912–1913
1924 (all were converted into fixed-roof trams)
Open balcony (fitted with canvas roof during bad weather)

English Electric of Preston, England, and Hong Kong & Whampoa Dock Co of Kowloon

(No. 47–62) new-build canvas-roof tramcars (No. 63–80) fixed wood-roof tramcars

Double-decker trams – wood
48 (44 as new, 4 rebuilt from single-deck tramcars; canvas-roof tramcars also rebuilt with fixed wooden roof)
1923–1924
1935 (pre–1920 bodies; others converted to fully enclosed tramcars)
First 16 new tramcars fitted with canvas roof; others fitted with fixed wooden roof

HKT, Hong Kong – fully enclosed tramcars (prewar design)
Double-decker trams – wood
119 (57 as new, 62 were rebuilt from existing fleet)
1925–1949
1955
62 trams were converted from 14 single-deck trams and 48 canvas-roof and wood-roof trams

HKT, Hong Kong – postwar tramcars (1949, 1950s design)
Double-decker trams – aluminium panels, teak frame
163 (43 as new, 1 rebuilt in 1979 from non-powered trailer No. 1; others rebuilt from existing fleet)
1949 (original No. 120), 1950–1964 (No. 121–162), 1979 (No. 163)
1992

HKT, Hong Kong – refurbished postwar tramcars, tramcars with 1987 design (current design)
Double-decker trams – aluminium panels, teak frame
160 – No. 120 (rebuilt in 1990s based on 1950s design) and rest from the 1980s (No. 1–27, No. 29–43, No. 45–119, No. 121–127, No. 129–143, No. 145–163, No. 165–166)
Rebuilt from 1986, 1987–1992
1991 (refurbished postwar tramcars)
Tramcar No. 120 is distinguished by its green-coloured interior, teak-lined windows, and rattan seats. The interior of the No. 50 tramcar displayed at the Hong Kong Museum of History (different from the No. 50 tramcar currently in service) has a similar appearance.
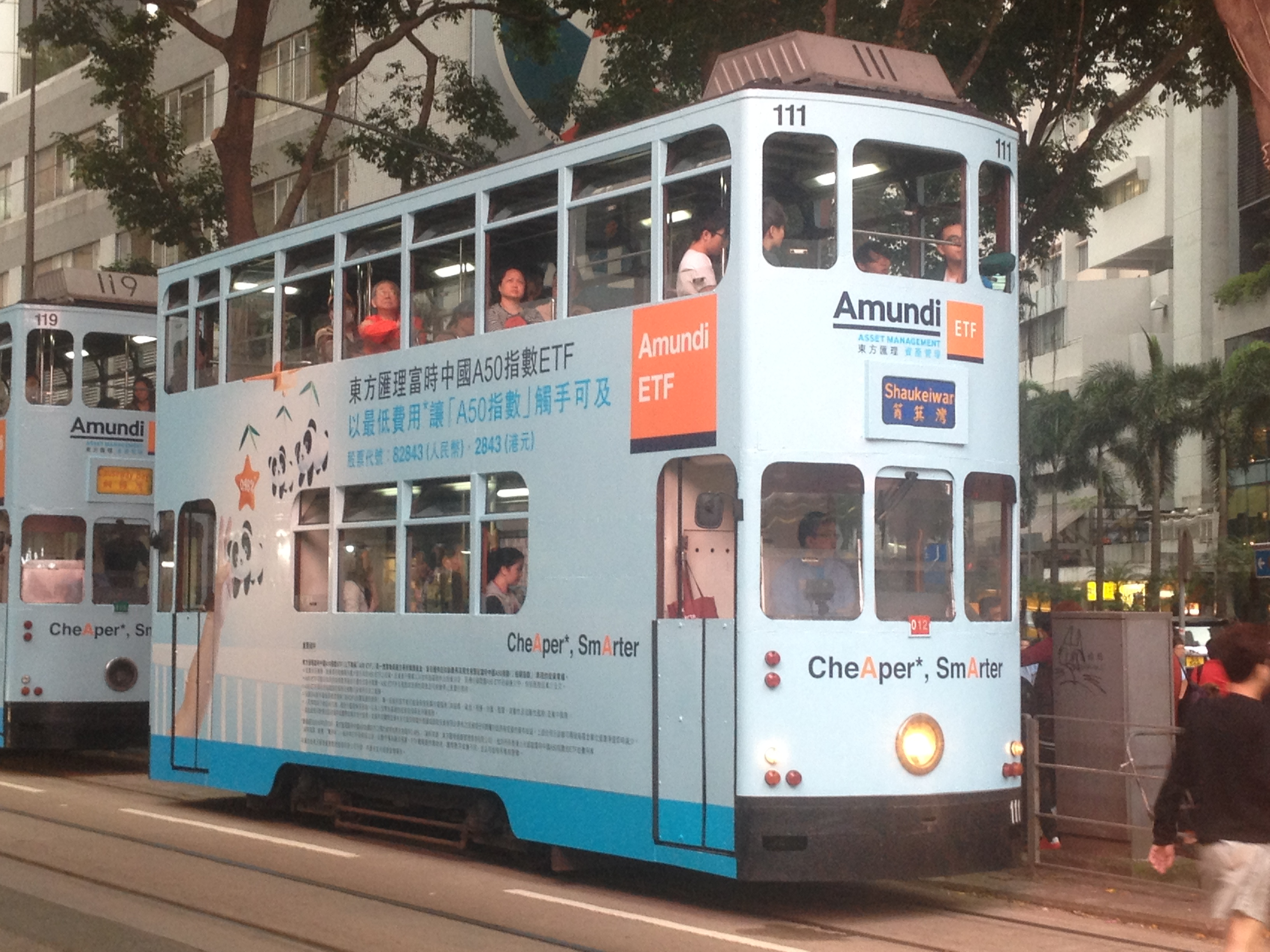
HKT, Hong Kong – Millennium
Double-decker trams – aluminium alloy
4 (only 3 in service) – No. 168–171
2000
2023 (No. 171)
Tramcar No. 168 was modified into a Signature prototype car in 2011, No. 171 (different from the No. 171 tramcar currently in service) was a prototype air-conditioned tramcar which was never in service
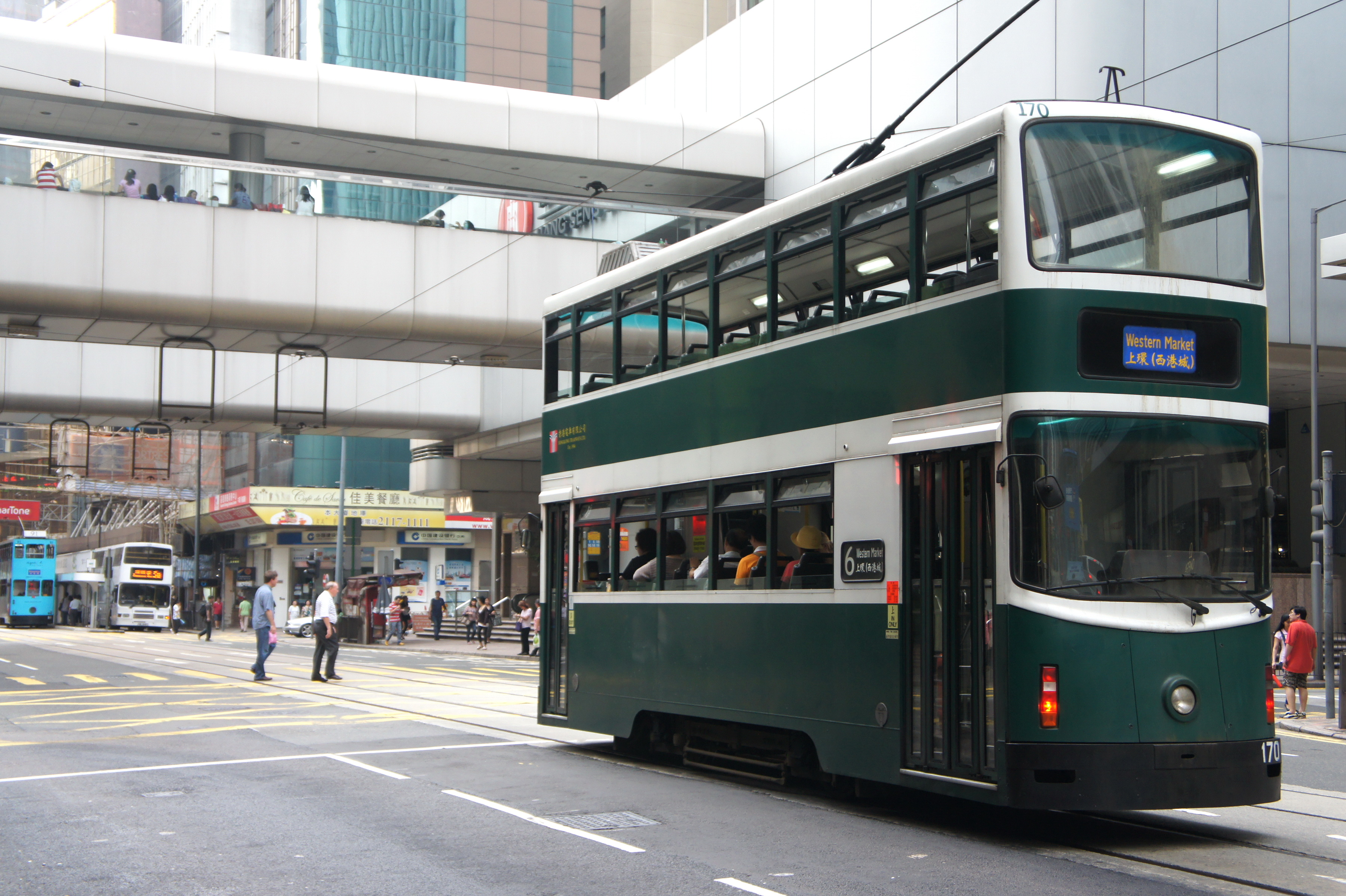
HKT, Hong Kong – trailer tramcars
Passenger single-deck tramcars – aluminium alloy, (No. 1 – aluminium panels, teak frame)
22
1964, 1965–1966
1982 (except No. 1, which was rebuilt as double-decker tramcar No. 163)
Non-powered trailers
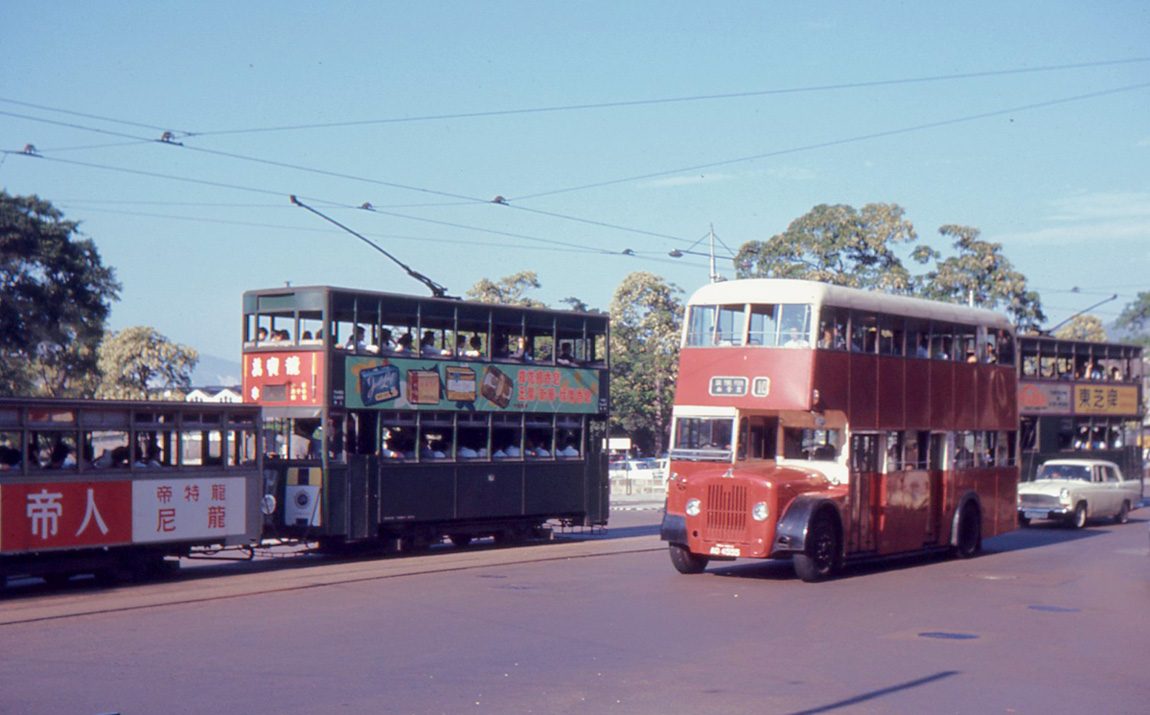
HKT, Hong Kong – work tramcar
Single-deck tramcar
1 – No. 200 (first generation)
1956
1984

HKT, Hong Kong – work tramcars
Double-decker trams
3 – No. 200, No. 300, and No. 400
1997 (No. 200), 2007 (No. 300), 2013 (No. 400)
2023
Tramcar No. 300 runs on electricity and also a diesel motor
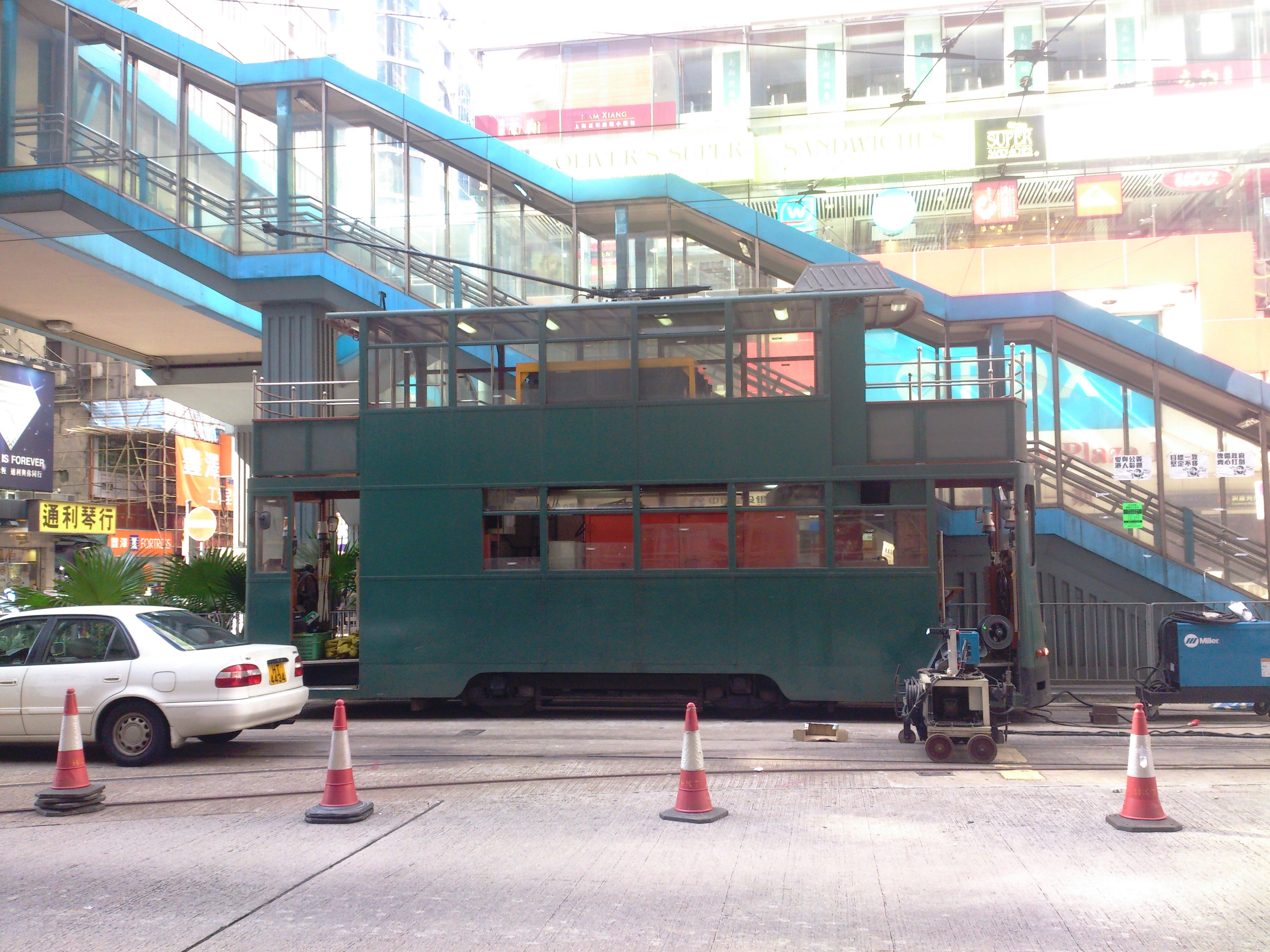
HKT, Hong Kong – private hire tramcars
Antique-style double-decker trams – aluminium panels, teak frame
2 – No. 28 and No. 128 (rebuilt from postwar tramcars No. 59 and No. 119)
1985, 1987

Private charter only
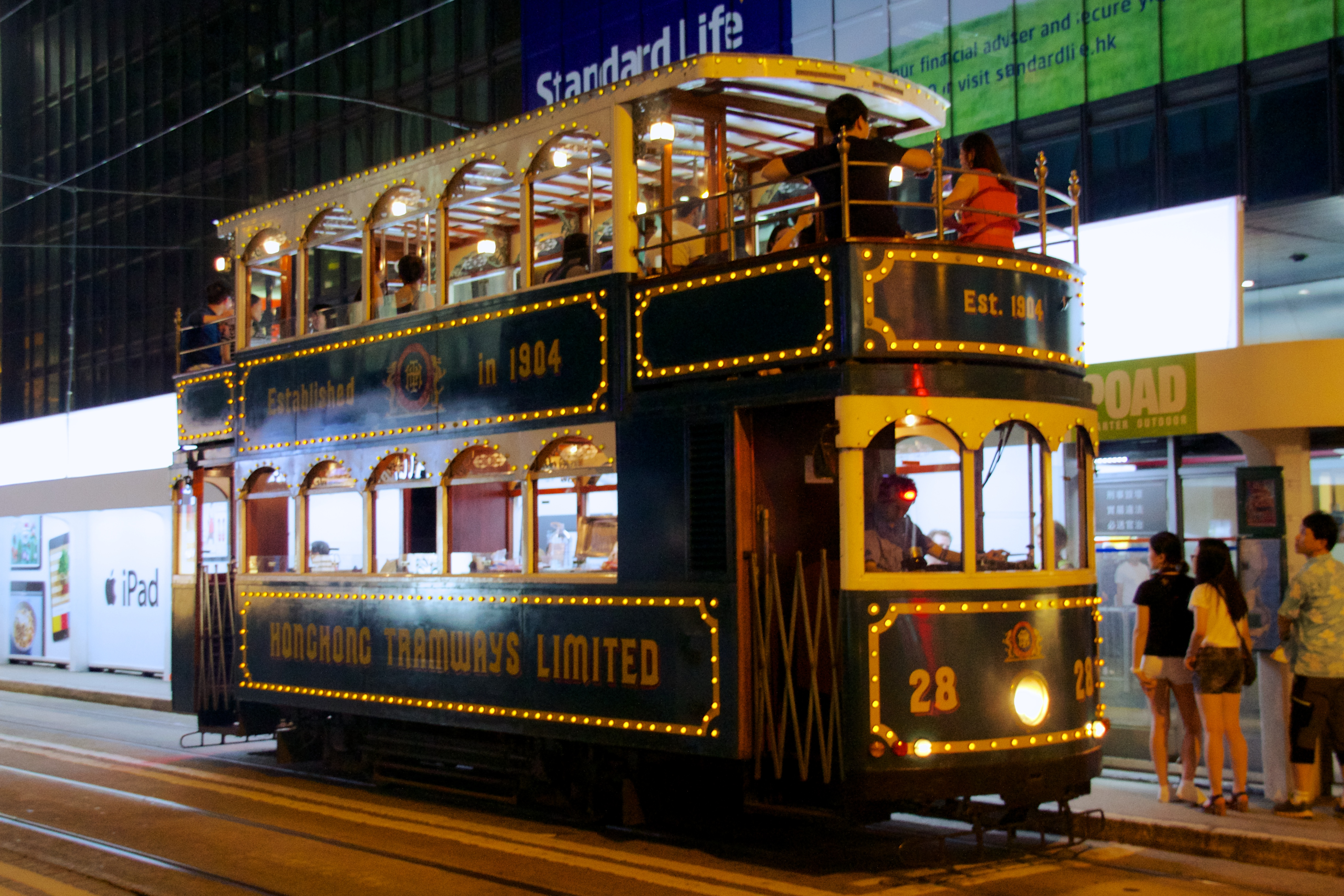
HKT, Hong Kong – first batch of VVVF drive vehicle (except No. 169 and No. 170, which retained its chopper-controlled drive)
Double-decker trams – aluminium alloy, (No. 172 – prototype, aluminium panels, teak frame)
100 – No. 1, No. 3, No. 5, No. 9, No. 11–14, No. 16, No. 19, No. 21–23, No. 25, No. 29, No. 32, No. 35–36, No. 39–43, No. 45–49, No. 52, No. 54–60, No. 64–66, No. 69–70, No. 73–74, No. 77, No. 79–80, No. 88-89, No. 93–95, No. 97–103, No. 105–106, No. 108–111, No. 115–119, No. 122, No. 126–127, No. 129, No. 132–133, No. 136–137, No. 140–141, No. 143, No. 145–146, No. 148–149, No. 153–158, No. 162, No. 165, No. 168–175
2009–present

Exterior of body based on 1986-cars, but with Millennium tramcars interior, fitted with LED destination display. "Bright Ring" trams No. 14, No. 39, No. 57, No. 89, No. 102 and No. 119 have LED panels installed on the sides. While No. 168-169 were directly converted from Millennium tramcars.
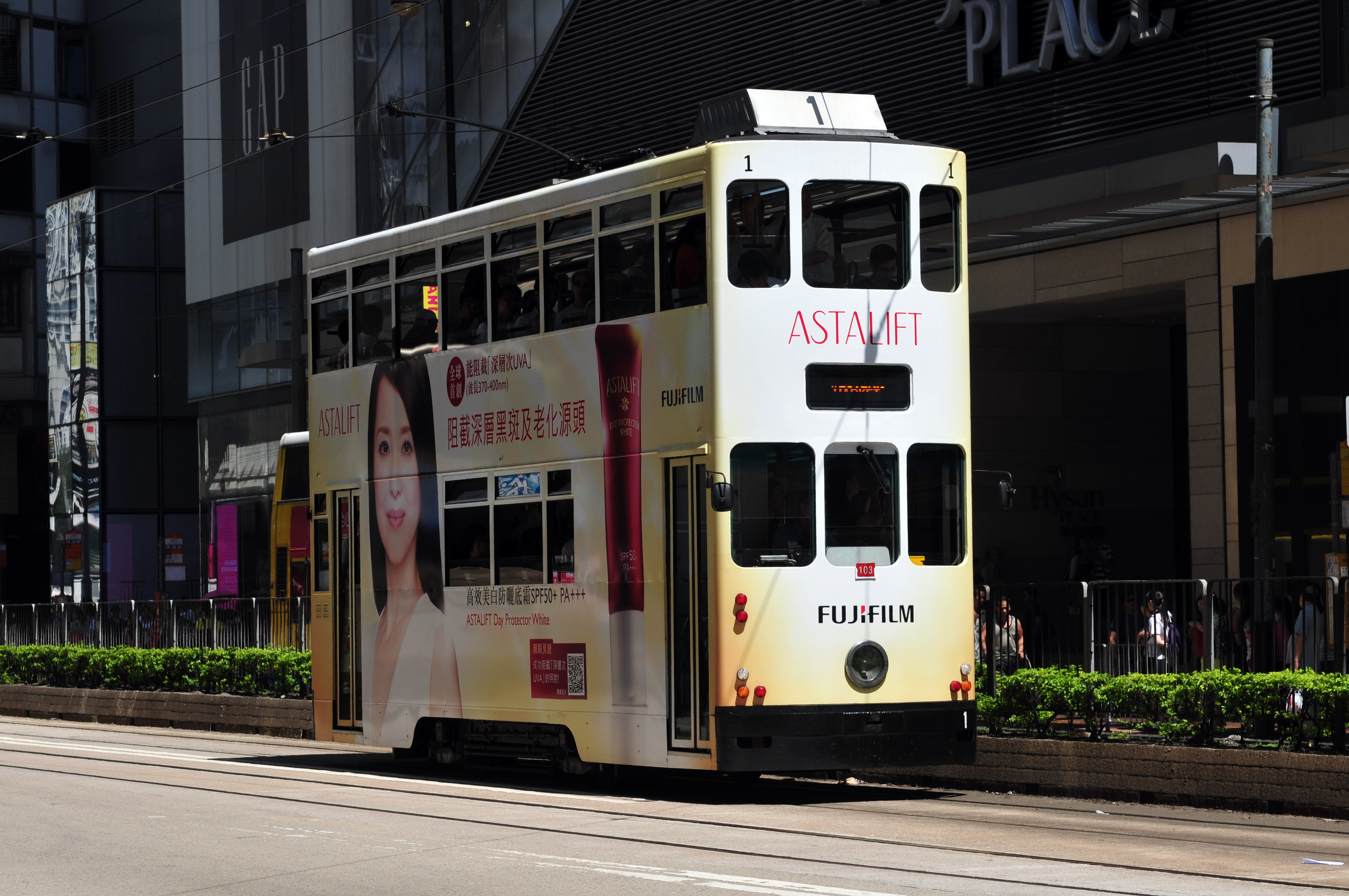
HKT, Hong Kong – sightseeing tramcar
Antique-style double-decker tram – aluminium alloy
1 – No. 68
2016

1920s design; used for sightseeing tours
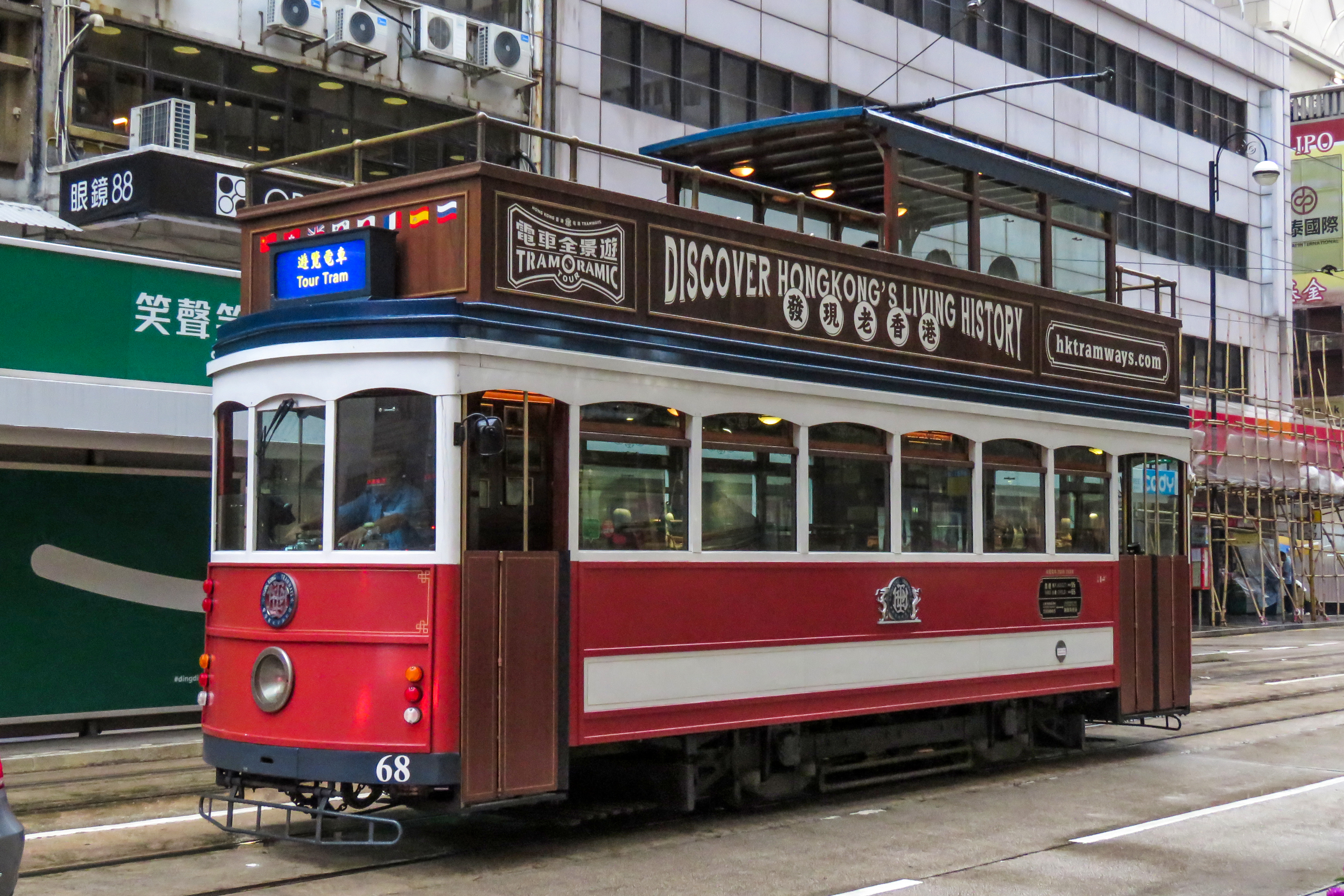
HKT, Hong Kong – first air-conditioned commuter vehicle "Pilot Cooler Tram"
Double-decker trams – aluminium alloy
1 – No. 88
2016

Three months trial service from 6 June 2016; first HKT commuter tram with air-conditioning installed
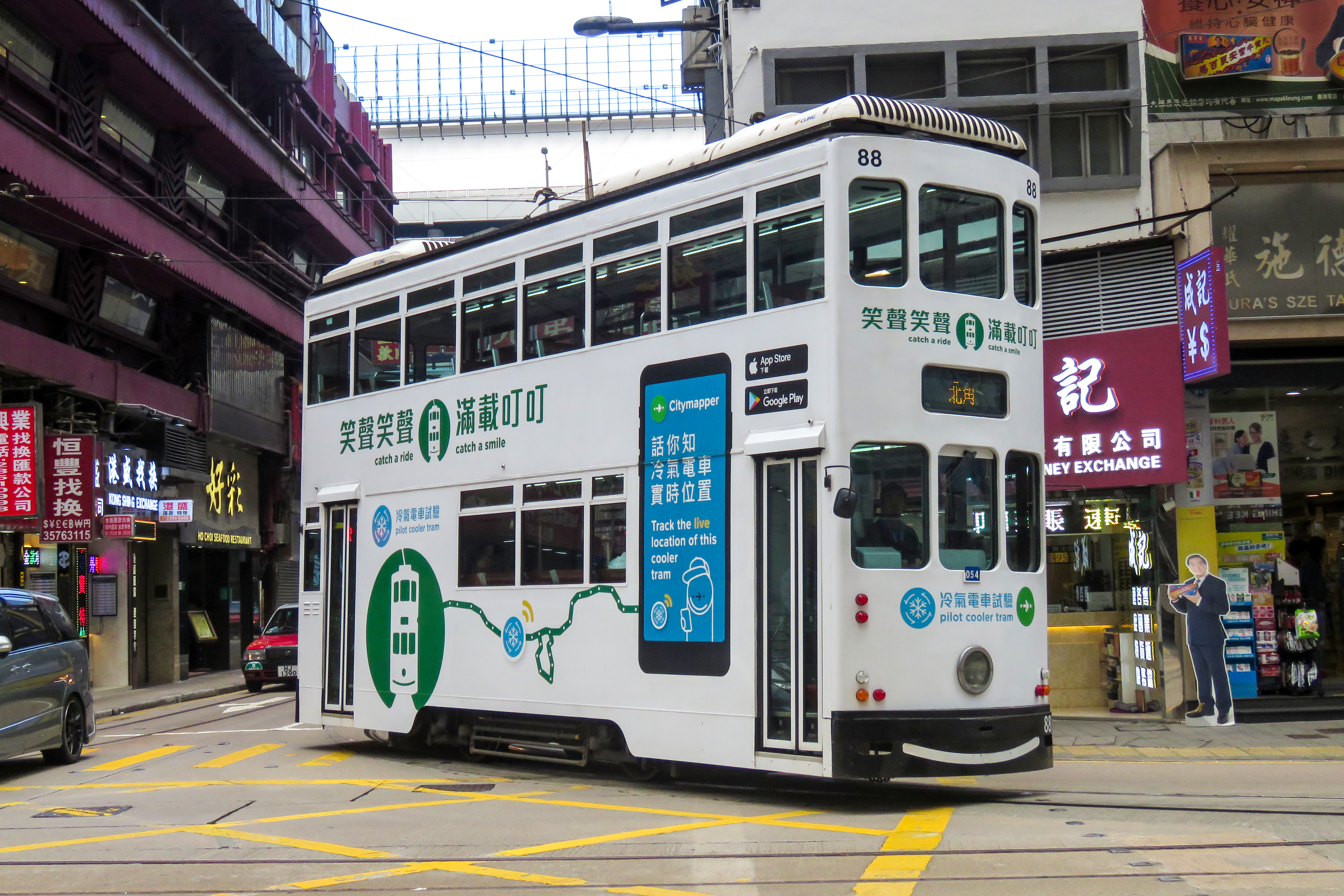
HKT, Hong Kong, and Circus Limited, Hong Kong – premium private hire tramcar
Antique-style double-decker tram – aluminium alloy
1 – No. 18
2018

Amenities include three separate themed rooms, air conditioning, and an on-board restroom.
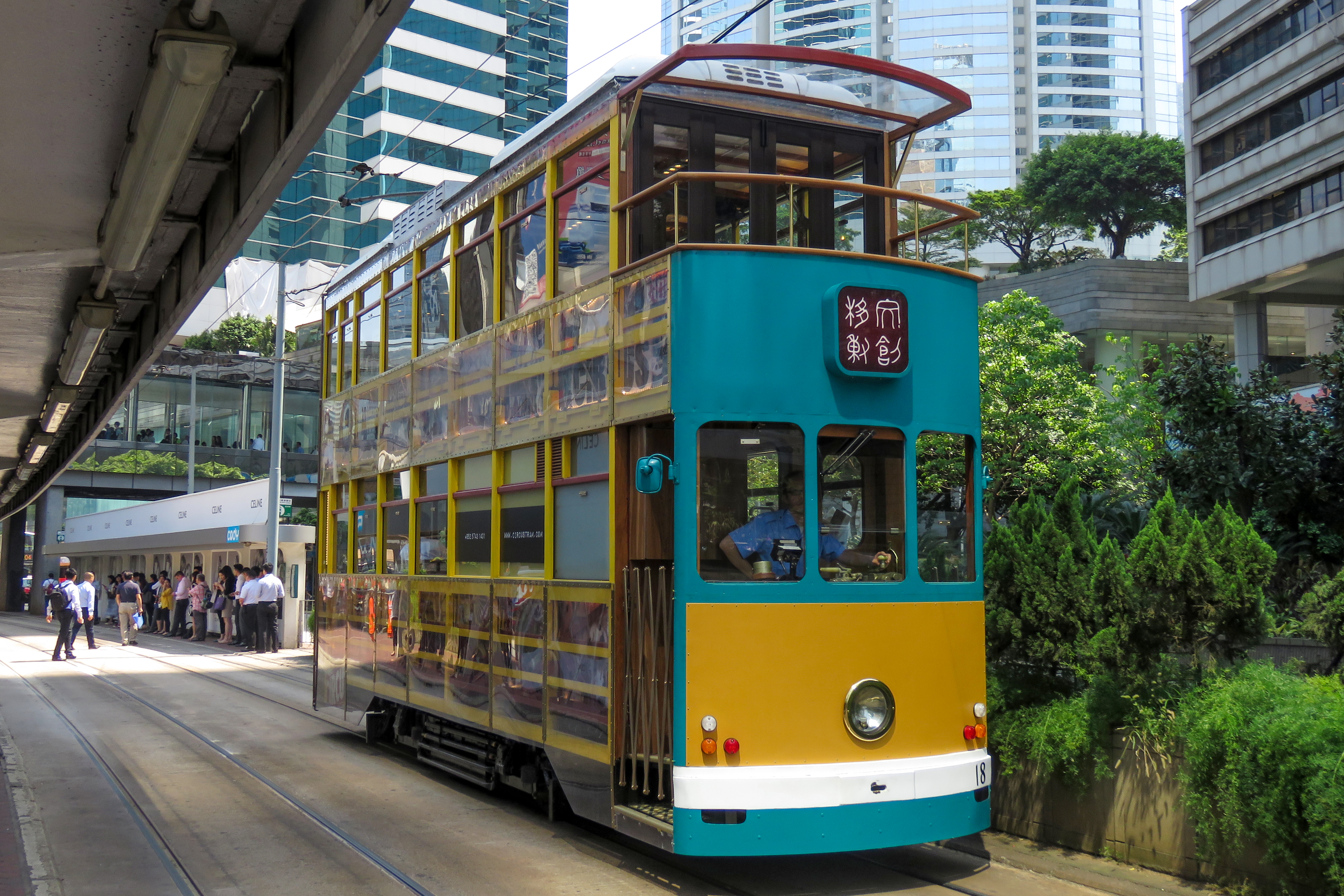

Note: Generally, there are no specific/official generation categories on tramcars. Many of the trams in one generation were simply modifications of the previous, such as open-balcony tramcars fitted with canvas roofs and then wooden roofs. The term "generation" should only apply to the new designs.

=== Service fleet ===
- Mitsubishi Fuso Canter overhead cable maintenance vehicle No. 6016.
- Temporary truck stand used for raising tram bodies and frames when trucks are removed for maintenance; it has small wheels that allow it to move around the depot.

== Depots ==
=== Current depots ===
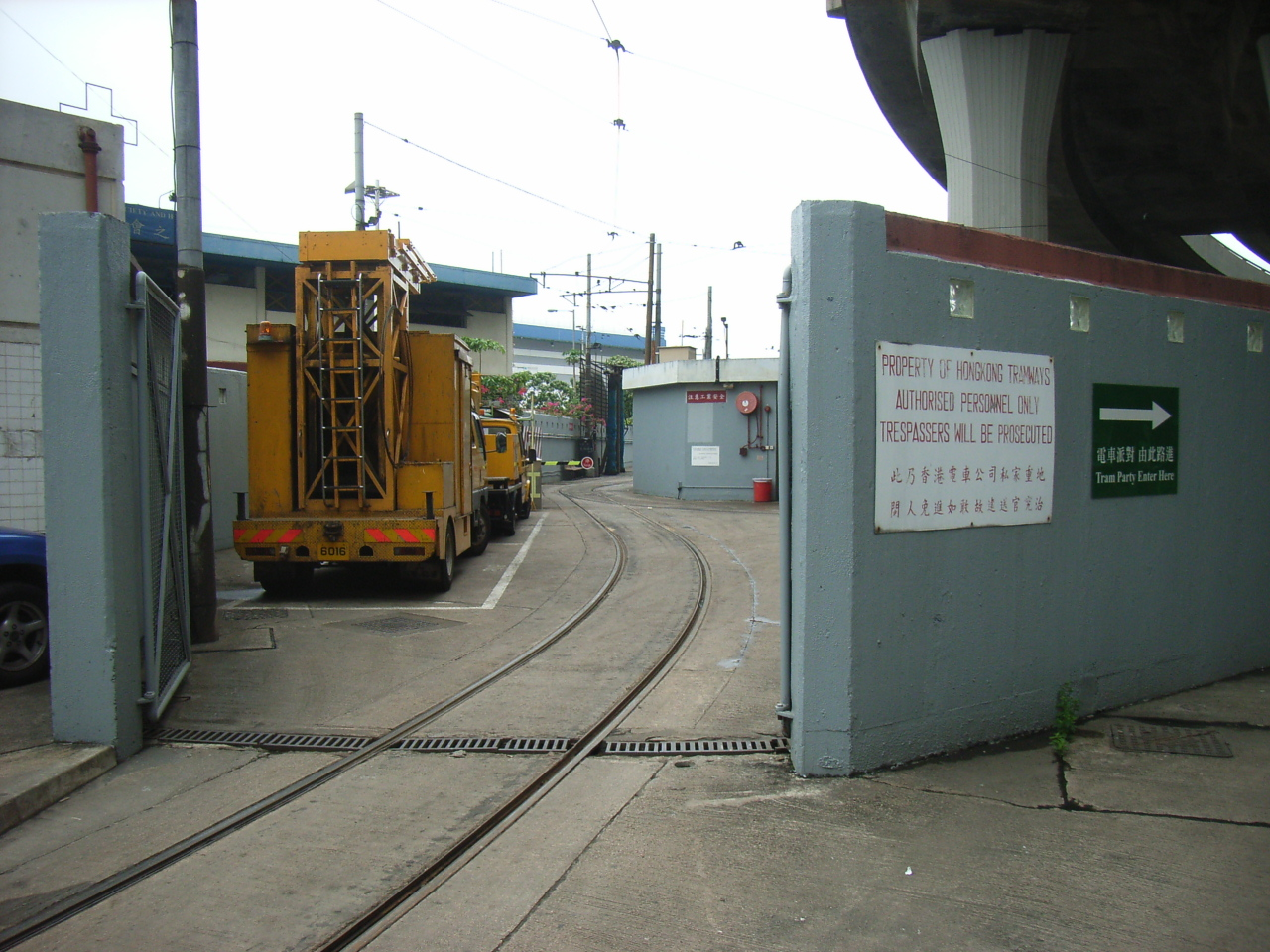
Whitty Street Depot

Whitty Street Depot, which opened on 27 May 1989 and is located in Shek Tong Tsui, is the main depot for current operations and trams overhaul. It previously operated as a terminus. When the Sharp Street Depot was closed in 1989, the site was expanded by 1.28 hectares (3.2 acres). It has a two-storey workshop with capacity of over 100 trams.

Sai Wan Ho Depot opened on 28 April 1989 and occupies a site of 0.7 hectares (1.7 acres) leased from the government on a 5-year renewable tenancy. It lies beneath the Island Eastern Corridor near Shau Kei Wan Road and Hoi Foo Street. It has a capacity of over 60 trams and is for parking purpose only.

=== Former depots ===
A single, comprehensive depot at Russell Street in Causeway Bay was the only depot of the system from 1904. It was able to house the whole tram fleet (approximately 120 tramcars). By 1932, Russell Street Depot became overcrowded due to an upsurge in the number of trams, prompting HKT to build North Point Depot at King's Road for tram parking purposes (storage for 30 tramcars). Russell Street Depot was later expanded and renamed Sharp Street Depot. North Point Depot closed in 1951; its former location is now the site of the Healthy Gardens complex. In July 1986, the Executive Council approved HKT's plan to establish new depots at Shek Tong Tsui and Sai Wan Ho. HKT claimed that $3.5 million in operating costs would be saved. HKT promised that fares would be unchanged until the end of 1988. Sharp Street Depot was closed on 20 March 1989. The site is now occupied by the Times Square complex.

== Projects ==
=== Current projects ===
In 2010, HKT appointed a consultancy firm to investigate the feasibility of constructing a 12 kilometres (7.5 mi) modern tramway system in the Kai Tak Development, built on the vacated site of the former Kai Tak Airport, in place of the Environmentally Friendly Linkage System monorail proposed by the Hong Kong Government. A proposal was submitted to the Development Bureau on 29 April 2013. HKT pointed out that the cost of constructing the proposed tram system is $2.8 billion, which is less than the $12 billion needed for a monorail system. Possible extensions to neighbouring places such as To Kwa Wan, Kowloon City, and Kwun Tong were suggested. Bruno Charrade, managing director of HKT, said that the new system's tramcars could be designed to resemble their Hong Kong Island counterparts or have a totally new design, depending on the government's discretion.

Beginning in 2011, the entire HKT fleet will be refurbished over a period of seven years at a cost of $75 million HKD. The trams will keep their original exterior design, but the outer teak structures will be replaced with aluminium structures. The benches on the lower decks of the trams will be replaced with modern-looking single seats. Digital broadcasts will be placed inside the trams to inform passengers of the next stop, and LED lighting will be installed. AC motors will replace the current DC motors and a new magnetic emergency braking system will be added.

=== Abandoned projects ===
During the 1910s, HKT proposed the Kowloon Tramways Project. However, the completion of KCR Railway caused the government to veto the plan.

In 1970, Chai Wan on the east side of Hong Kong Island was developed into a residential and industrial area, which greatly increased traffic demand to Central. Extending the tram line from Shau Kei Wan to Chai Wan was considered, but was ultimately rejected. This was due to low cost effectiveness associated with the need to tunnel through the hills between Shau Kei Wan and Chai Wan to maintain level track. The Island line of the MTR was built instead, and its first phase, between Chai Wan and Admiralty, opened on 31 May 1985.

During the development of Tuen Mun New Town in the 1970s, the government reserved space for the construction of a rail transportation system. In 1982, the government invited HKT to construct and operate a tram system in the area. HKT initially expressed interest in the construction of the railway and intended to operate it with double-decker trams, but later withdrew. The government then invited Kowloon-Canton Railway Corporation to construct and operate a light rail system. That system, now known as the Light Rail, opened to the public on 18 September 1988.

== April 2017 accident ==
During the early hours of Thursday, 6 April 2017, a tram tipped over in Central, injuring 14 people. Soon after, it was suggested that the tram was travelling too fast into a turn. The driver was later arrested for allegedly causing grievous bodily harm due to dangerous driving. Two days later, it was reported that HKT suspended a speed monitoring programme intended to discourage drivers from travelling too slowly.

== See also ==
- Blackpool Tramway, also uses double-deck trams, but not exclusively
- Trams in Alexandria, also uses double-deck trams, but not exclusively
- Trams in China
- Transport in Hong Kong
