= Shek Tong Tsui Terminus =

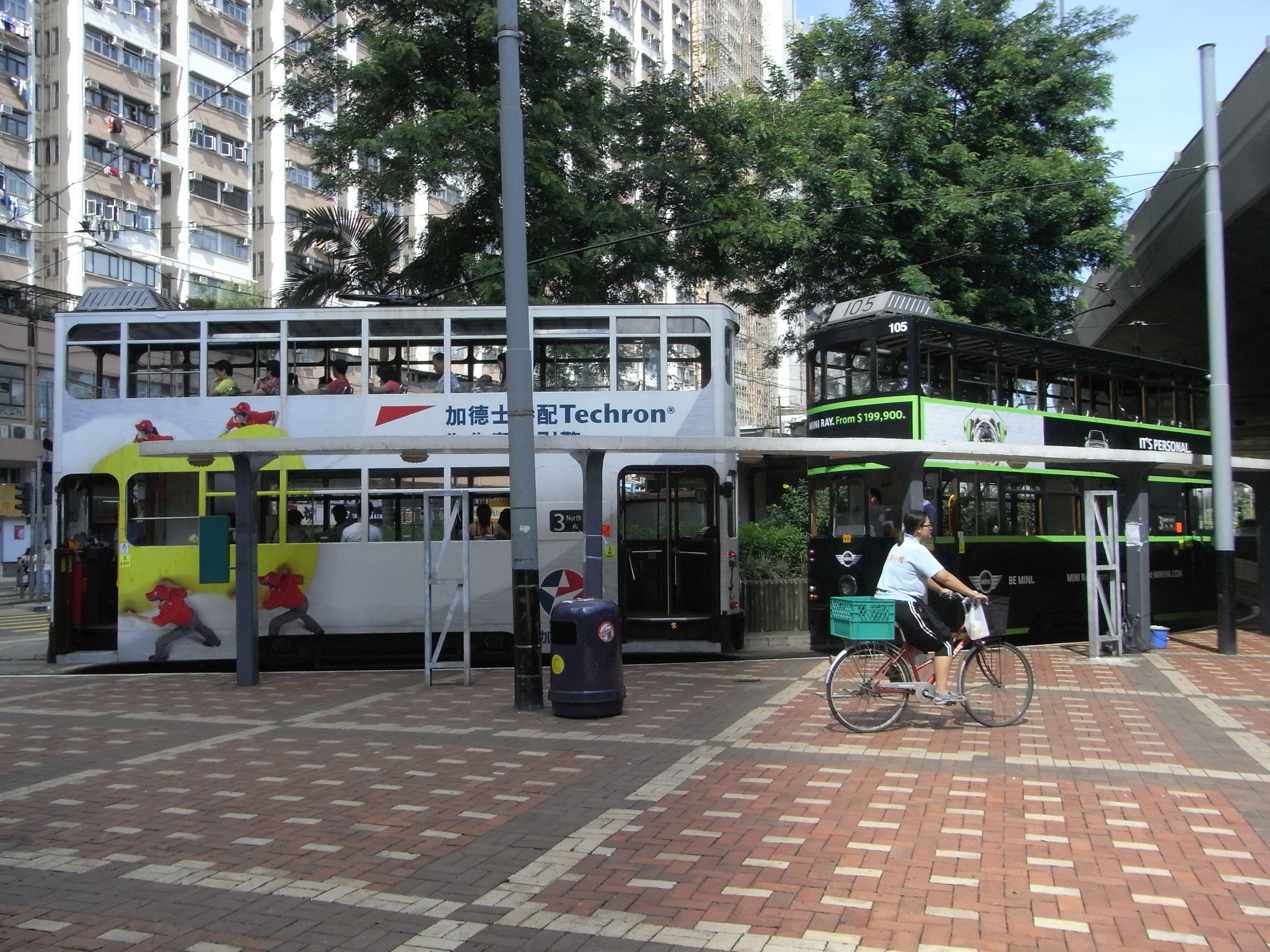

General information
- Coordinates: 22.2872°N 114.1350°E
- Owner: Hong Kong Tramways
- Platforms: 1 side platform
- Tracks: 1

Services
Preceding stop	Hong Kong Tramways	Following stop
Terminus	Hong Kong Tramways	Whitty Street towards Causeway Bay or North Point
Location

Shek Tong Tsui Terminus (Chinese: 石塘咀總站) is a tram stop and one of the seven termini of Hong Kong Tramways, a double-decker tram system. Located in Shek Tong Tsui, it is one of the system's three termini in the Central and Western District on Hong Kong Island.

== Routes ==
- Shek Tong Tsui ↔ Causeway Bay
- Shek Tong Tsui ↔ North Point

== Whitty Street Depot ==
A tramcar depot is located nearby on Fung Mat Road at Water Street. The depot contains workshop facilities and a storage yard capable of holding 109 tramcars. It replaced the Sharp Street East Depot.
