= Kennedy Town Terminus =

Tram stop in Kennedy Town, Hong Kong

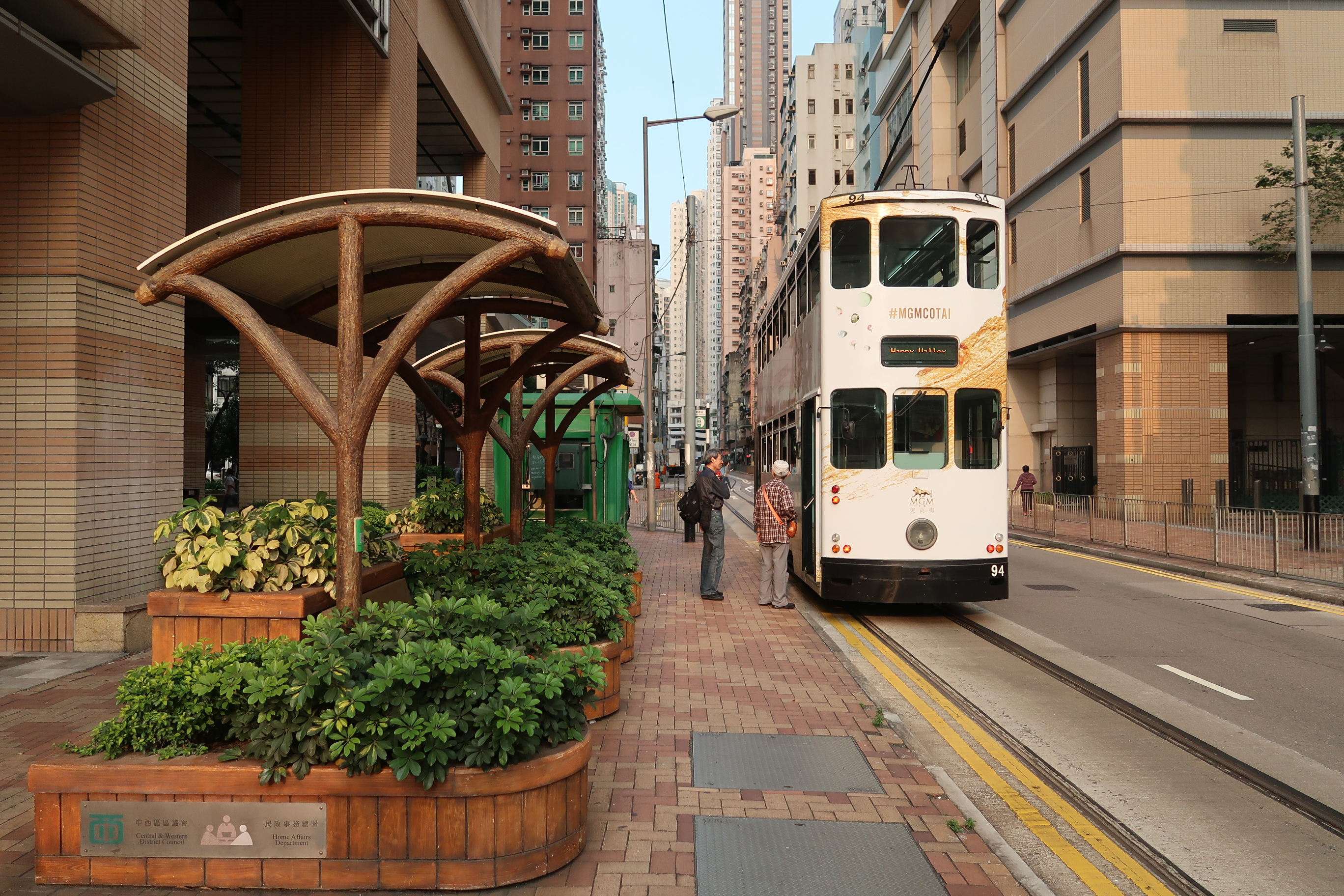

General information
- Coordinates: 22.2830°N 114.1263°E
- Owner: Hong Kong Tramways
- Platforms: 1 side platform
- Tracks: 1

Services
Preceding stop	Hong Kong Tramways	Following stop
Terminus	Hong Kong Tramways	North Street towards Happy Valley or Shau Kei Wan
Terminus	Hong Kong Tramways	Davis Street One-way operation
Location

Kennedy Town Terminus (Chinese: 堅尼地城總站) is a tram stop and one of the seven termini of Hong Kong Tramways, a double-decker tram system. Located in Kennedy Town, it is the system's westernmost terminus, and one of its three termini in the Central and Western District on Hong Kong Island.

== Routes ==
- Kennedy Town ↔ Happy Valley
- Kennedy Town ↔ Shau Kei Wan
