= Staunton Creek =

Wong Chuk Hang 黃竹坑涌尾
- Suburb
- Staunton Creek
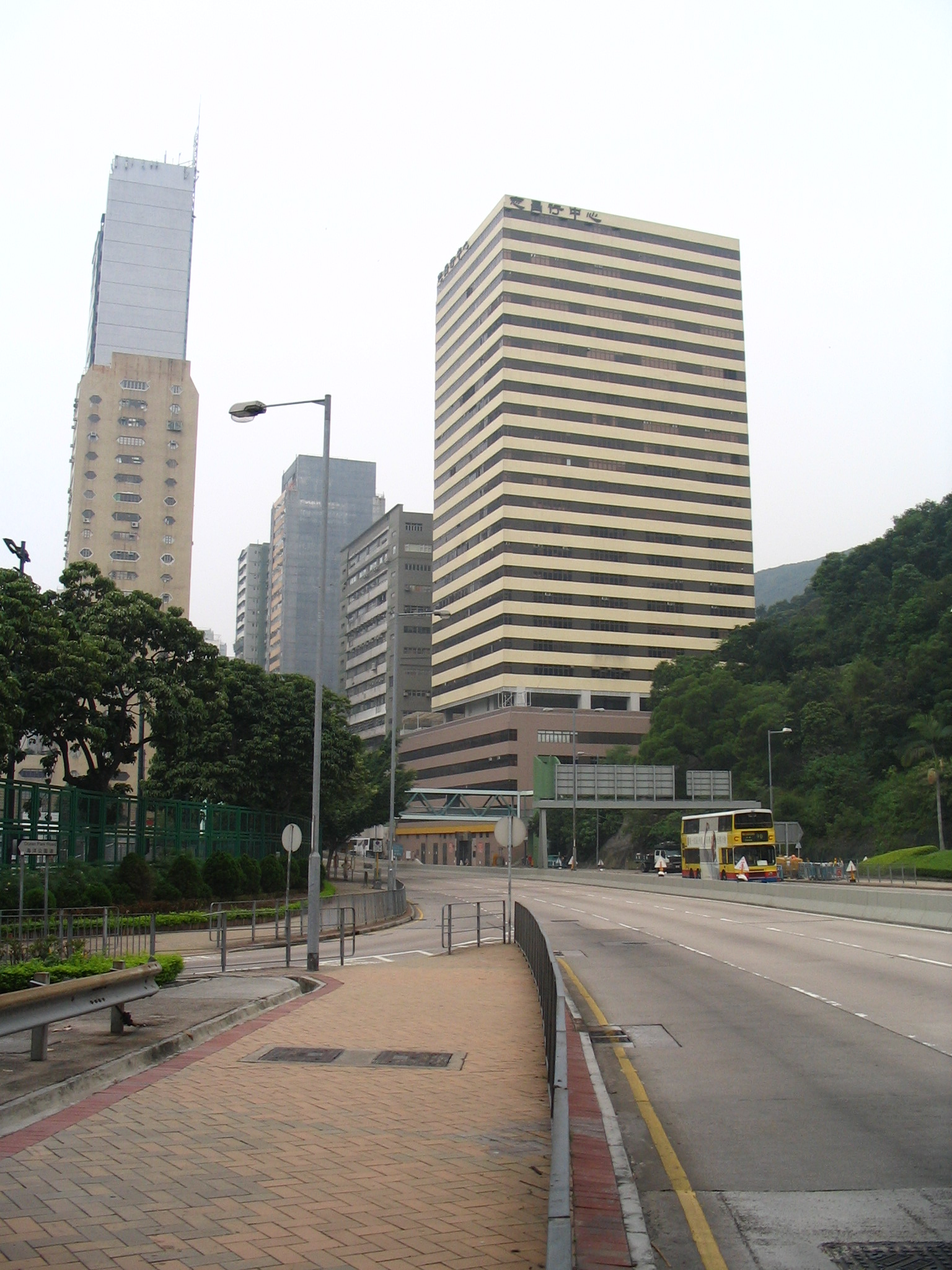
- A view of commercial and industrial Staunton Creek from the Wong Chuk Hang Road
- Interactive map of Wong Chuk Hang
- Country: Hong Kong
- District: Southern District
- Seat: Wong Chuk Hang

Government
  - Body: District Council
  - District Councillor: Tsui Yuen-wa (Democratic Party)

Staunton Creek
- Traditional Chinese: 黃竹坑涌尾
- Cantonese Yale: Wòhngjūkhāangcūngmèi
- Literal meaning: "Creek's end of Yellow Bamboo Gully"
Transcriptions
Standard Mandarin
- Hanyu Pinyin: Huángzhúkēng
- Gwoyeu Romatzyh: Hwangjwukeng
- IPA: [xwǎŋ.ʈʂǔ.kʰə́ŋ]
Yue: Cantonese
- Yale Romanization: Wòhngjūkhāangcūngmèi
- Jyutping: Wong4zuk1haang1cung1mei5
- IPA: [wɔ̏ːŋ.tsók̚.háːŋ]

Staunton Creek is a neighbourhood in the Southern District of Hong Kong Island, in Hong Kong. It is west of Wong Chuk Hang, north of Sham Wan, and east of Aberdeen.

Staunton Creek became urbanised only in the 1960s as one of the major light industrial areas in Hong Kong. Its fortune has been in decline since the 1990s, when large numbers of manufacturers relocated from Hong Kong to mainland China.

As of the 2010s Staunton Creek is in a state of transition: attracted by cheap rents, improved transport connection, and proximity to the tourist areas of Aberdeen and Ocean Park, several office towers have been built, a number of art galleries and restaurants have moved into empty factory floors, and several hotels, including L'hotel Island South and Ovolo Southside, have opened.

== Economy ==
The fashion company I.T has its head office on the 31st floor of Tower A of Southmark (南滙廣場) in Staunton Creek.

== Landmarks ==
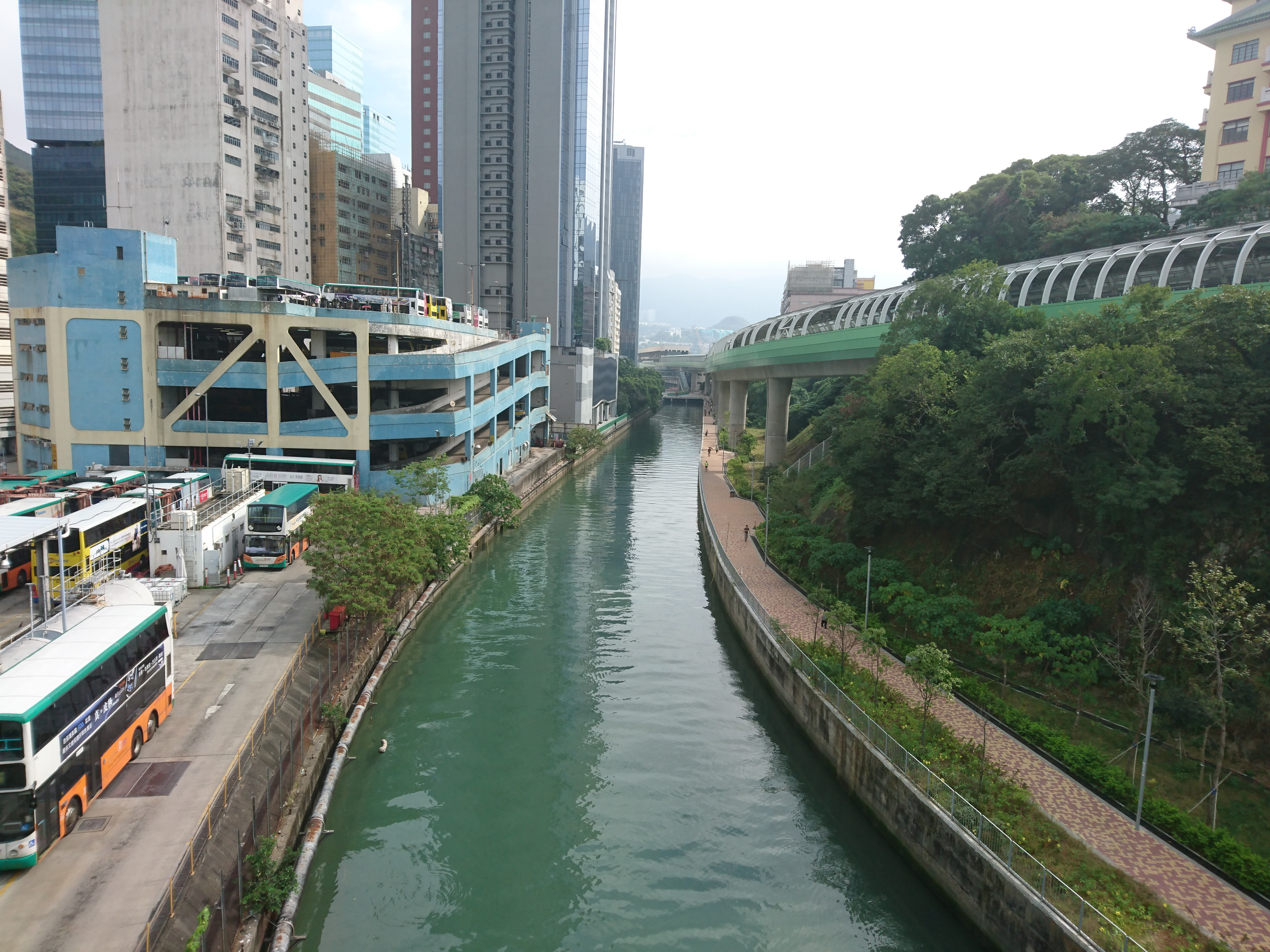
Staunton Creek Nullah. The blue building on the left is the NWFB Wong Chuk Hang Depot. A section of South Island line of the MTR is visible on the right.

Features of Wong Chuk Hang include:

- Holy Spirit Seminary
- Wong Chuk Hang Estate
- Staunton Creek Nullah
