= South Island line =

Hong Kong MTR railway line

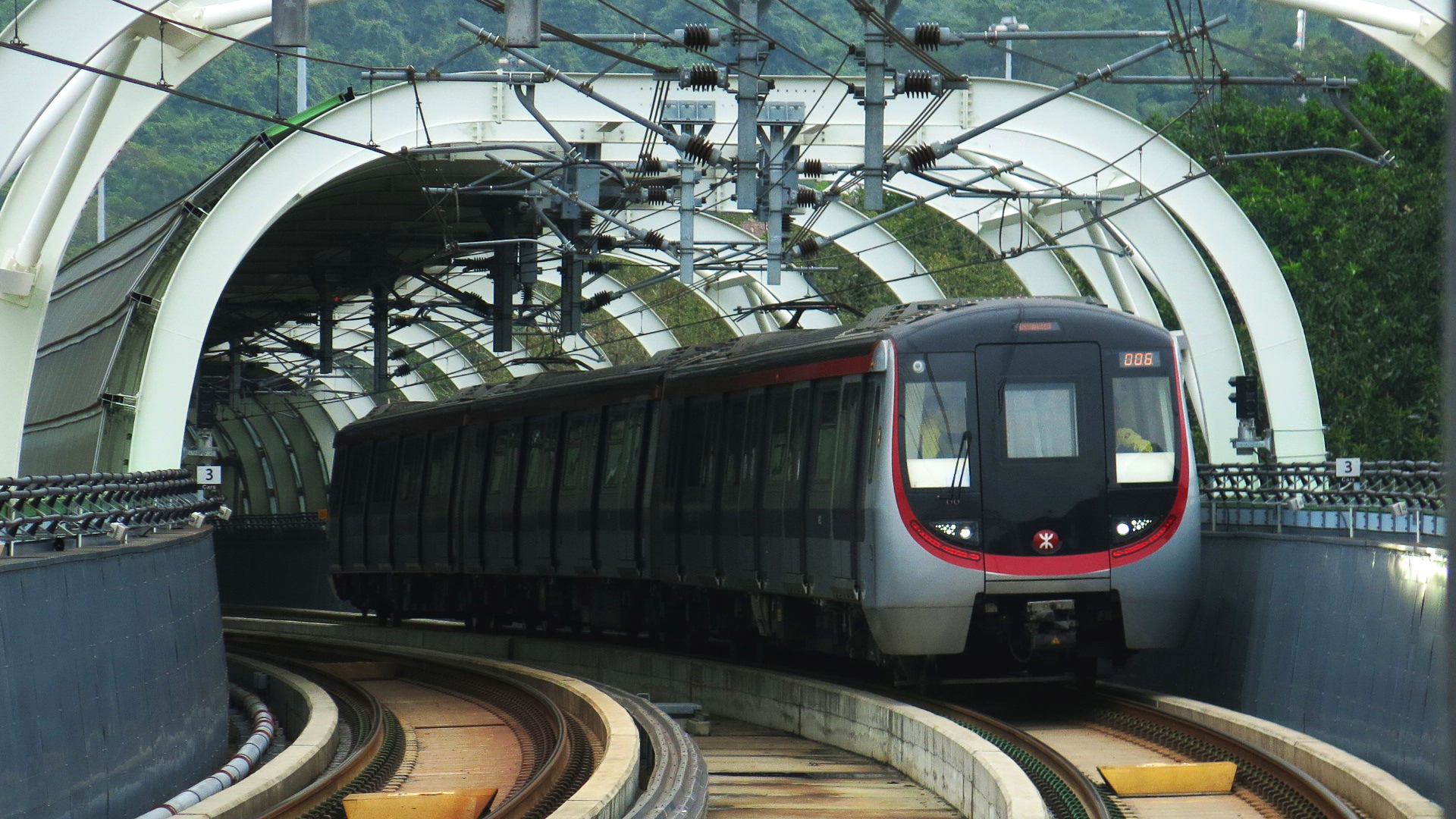
- Southbound train of the South Island line approaching Ocean Park

Overview
- Other name: South Island Line (East) (南港島綫（東段）)
- Native name: 南港島綫
- Status: Operational
- Owner: MTR Corporation
- Locale: Districts: Southern, Central & Western
- Termini: South Horizons; Admiralty
- Connecting lines: East Rail line Via Admiralty; Island line Via Admiralty; Tsuen Wan line Via Admiralty
- Stations: 5
- Color on map: Lime (#BAC429)

Service
- Type: Light metro, driverless
- System: MTR
- Operator: MTR Corporation
- Depot: Wong Chuk Hang
- Rolling stock: CNR Changchun EMU (S-Train variant)

History
- Opened: 28 December 2016

Technical
- Line length: 7.4 km (4.6 mi)
- Number of tracks: Double-track
- Track gauge: 1,435 mm (4 ft 8 1/2 in) standard gauge
- Electrification: 1,500 V DC (Overhead lines)
- Operating speed: Average: 38 km/h (24 mph); Maximum: 80 km/h (50 mph)
- Signalling: Alstom Urbalis 400 CBTC (Cab signalling, GoA4: UTO)
- Train protection system: ATP
Route map

South Island line
- Traditional Chinese: 南港島綫
- Simplified Chinese: 南港岛线
Transcriptions
Standard Mandarin
- Hanyu Pinyin: Nán Gǎngdǎo xiàn
Hakka
- Romanization: Nan-Gong-Dou Sien
Yue: Cantonese
- Yale Romanization: Nàahm Góngdóu sin
- Jyutping: naam4 gong2 dou2 sin3

The South Island line (Chinese: 南港島綫; Jyutping: naam^{4} gong^{2} dou^{2} sin^{3}) is a rapid transit line of Hong Kong's MTR metro system. This line connects the Hong Kong business district from Admiralty station to the Southern District of Hong Kong Island and the island of Ap Lei Chau, which was not served by any railway transport prior to the opening of the line. Approved by the Executive Council in 2007, the line commenced service on 28 December 2016. The rolling stock of the South Island line is purpose-built for driverless operation, with trains being remotely controlled from the Operations Control Centre in Tsing Yi.

It is one of two lines to have 5 stations, the other one being Airport Express. Additionally, it is one of the lines to have the fewest interchange stations, along with the Disneyland Resort Line, until the South Island Line (West) is approved to be built.

This line was known during planning and construction as the South Island line (East) to distinguish from South Island line (West), which is still being planned.

== History ==
The initial proposal for the line was developed in 2002, and went through a number of changes, at times combined with the West Island line and South Island line (West). The final alignment corresponds with "option B" of the 2005 revised scheme, with no intermediate station at Happy Valley included, in order to reduce the travel time to the central business district.

== Rolling stock ==
MTR defines the railway as a medium-capacity system. The final order for rolling stock for the new line consisted of 10 new three-car MTR CNR Changchun EMUs using steel wheels. These trains are externally similar to the new existing sets in service on the Kwun Tong line, but are fully automatic and driverless – the second such line in the MTR system after the Disneyland Resort line, and the third such line in Hong Kong. However, every train has at least one staff for patrol in the traffic hour who is qualified to control the train manually according to the requirements of the Fire Services Department since the commencement of the line. Trains operate with a frequency of three minutes during rush hour.

== Alignment ==
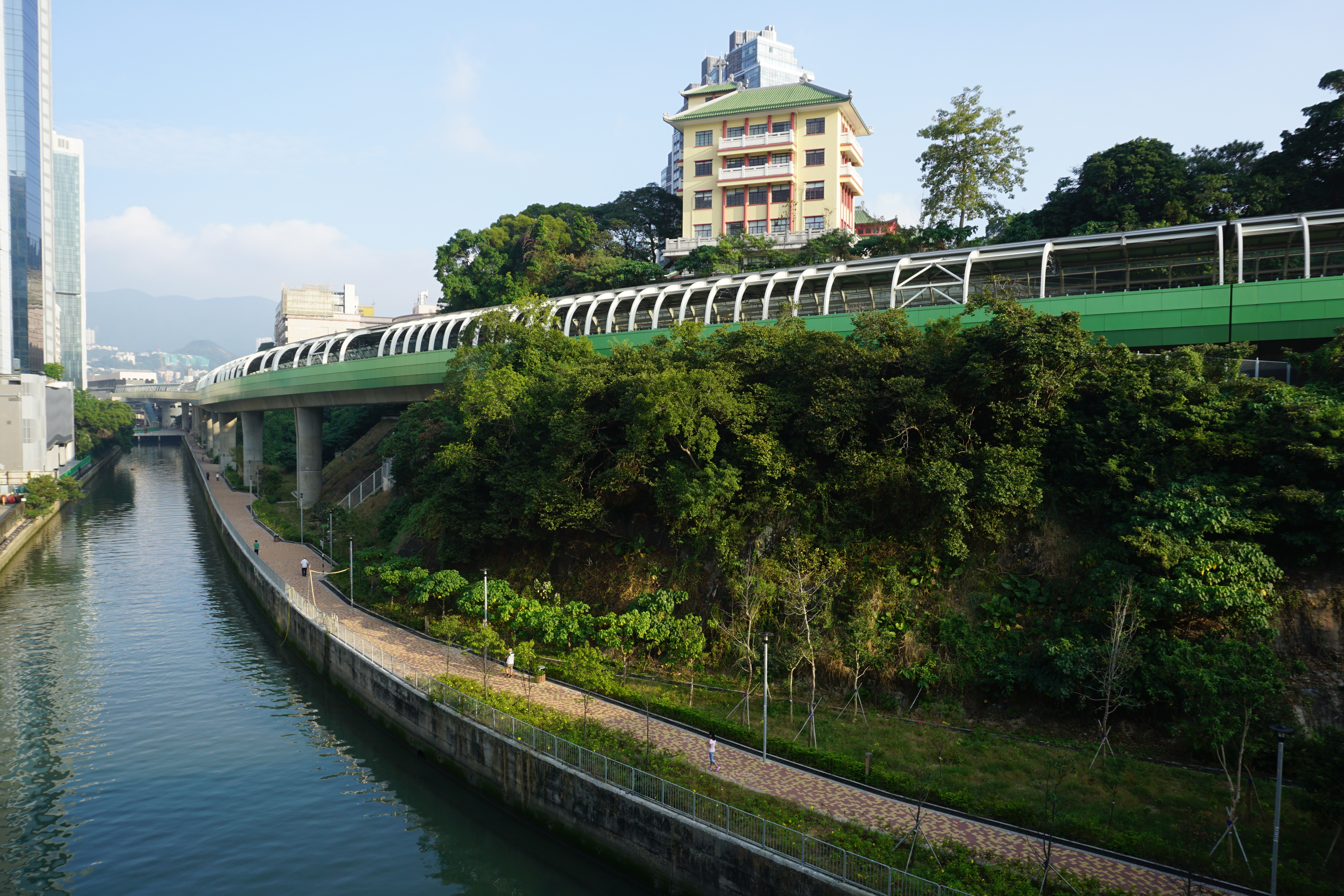
South Island line viaduct near Holy Spirit Seminary

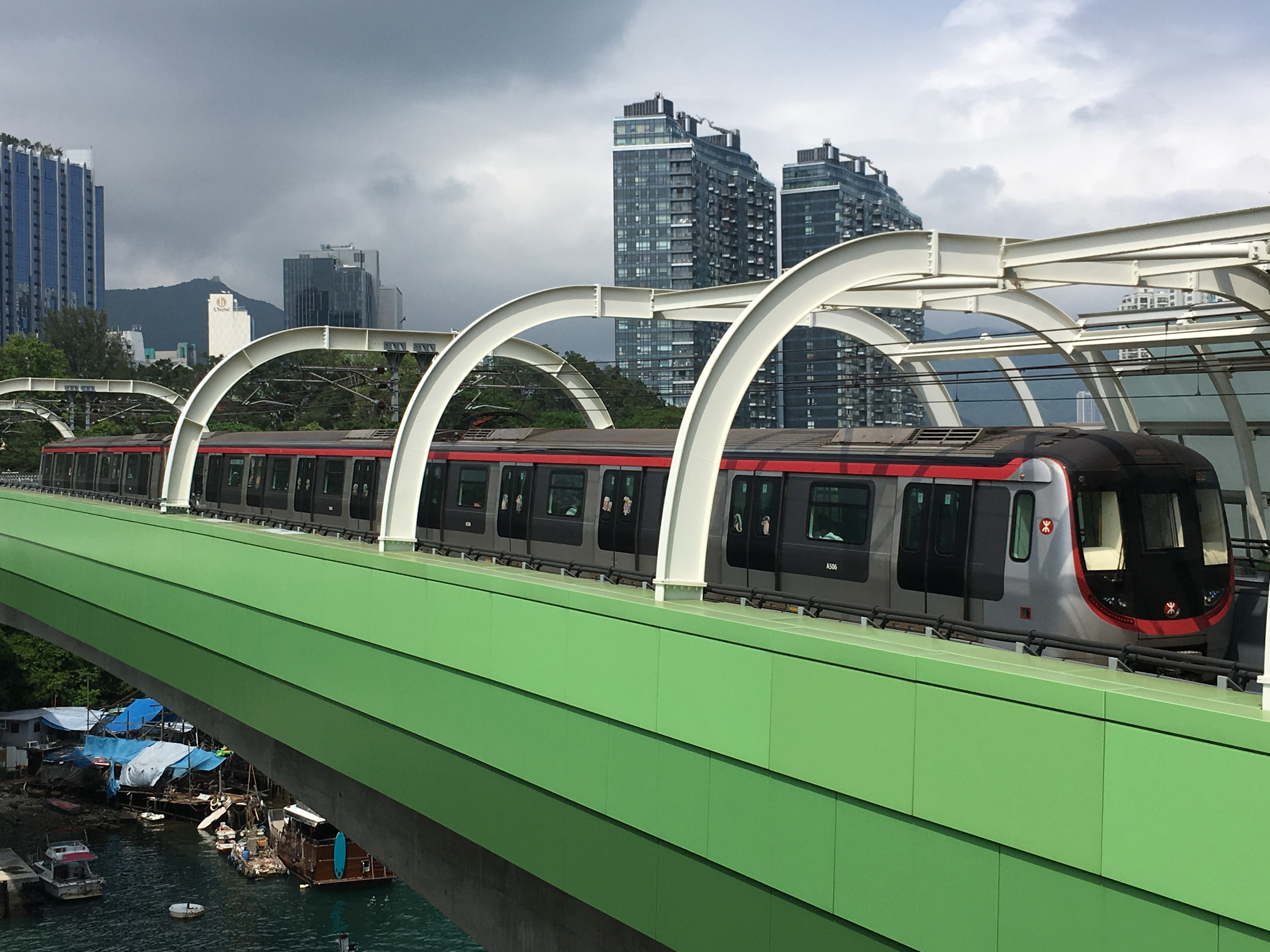
CNR Changchun EMU with cartoon animals in the windows

South Island line begins in tunnel at Admiralty station, an underground station connecting to the pre-existing Tsuen Wan and Island lines. From Admiralty the line travels southeastwards beneath Mount Cameron through the 3.2 km (2.0 mi) Nam Fung Tunnel, emerging into a covered viaduct at a site between the portal of Aberdeen Tunnel and Gleneagles Hospital, just before Ocean Park station.

The line then continues west on a viaduct through Wong Chuk Hang and Staunton Creek over a nullah, on which the Wong Chuk Hang station was built, and crosses the channel to the island of Ap Lei Chau on the Aberdeen Channel Bridge; after landing on Ap Lei Chau, the line enters a tunnel and continues to Lei Tung and South Horizons stations.

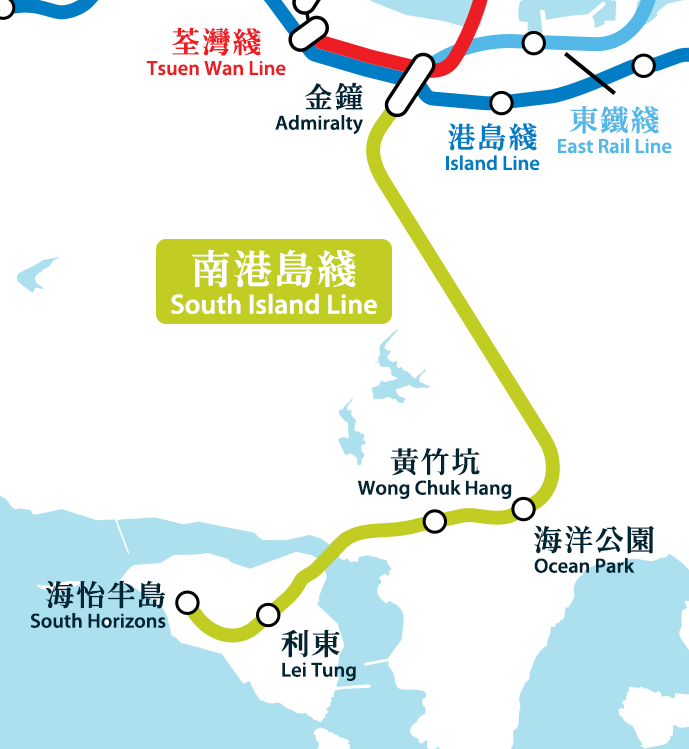
Geographically accurate map of the South Island line

== Stations ==
This is a list of the stations on the South Island line.

List

Livery	Station Name		Images	Interchange; Adjacent transportation	Opening	District
Livery	English	Chinese	Images	Interchange; Adjacent transportation	Opening	District
South Island Line (East) (SEL)
	Admiralty	金鐘		Tsuen Wan line; Island line; East Rail line	28 December 2016; 9 years ago	Central and Western
	Ocean Park	海洋公園		—	28 December 2016; 9 years ago	Southern
	Wong Chuk Hang	黃竹坑		South Island (West) (proposed)	28 December 2016; 9 years ago	Southern
	Lei Tung	利東		—	28 December 2016; 9 years ago	Southern
	South Horizons	海怡半島		—	28 December 2016; 9 years ago	Southern

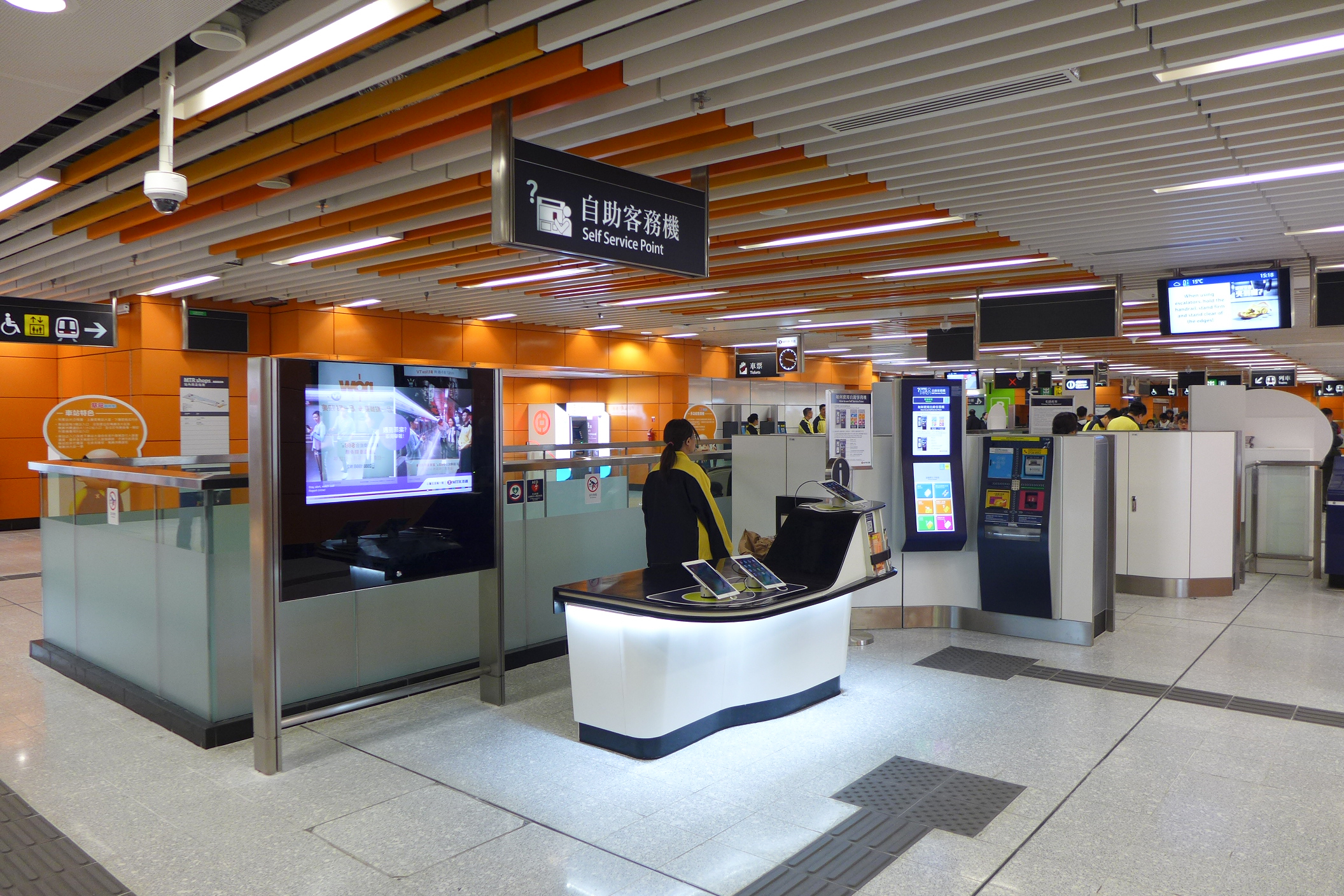
Station concourses are staffless, except those of Admiralty and Ocean Park stations. Customers are required to solve ticket problems with this Self Service Point machine. To its left is the information counter, which provides travel and street information only.

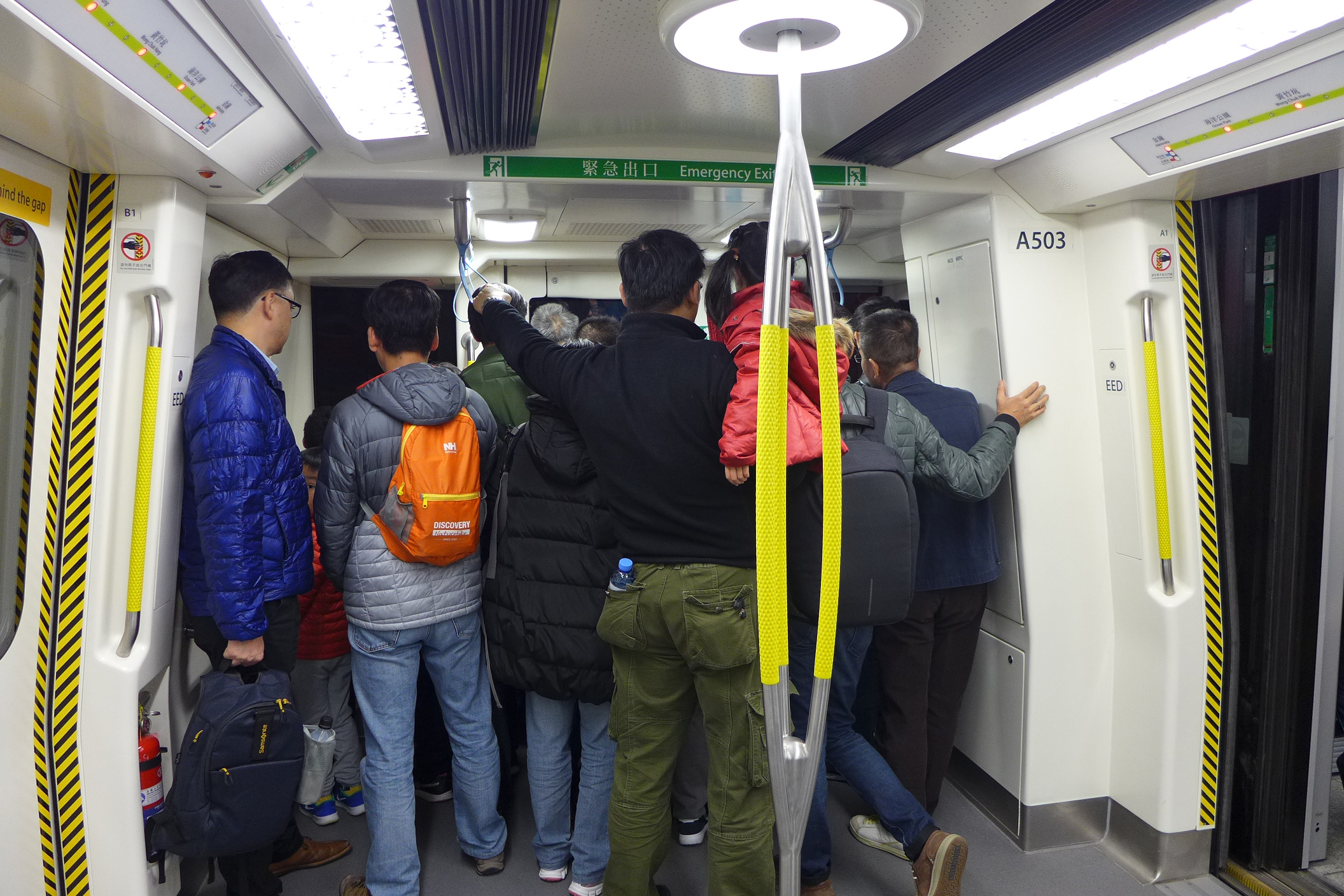
The trains do not have driver cabs, allowing passengers to see through the windows in the ends of the trains.

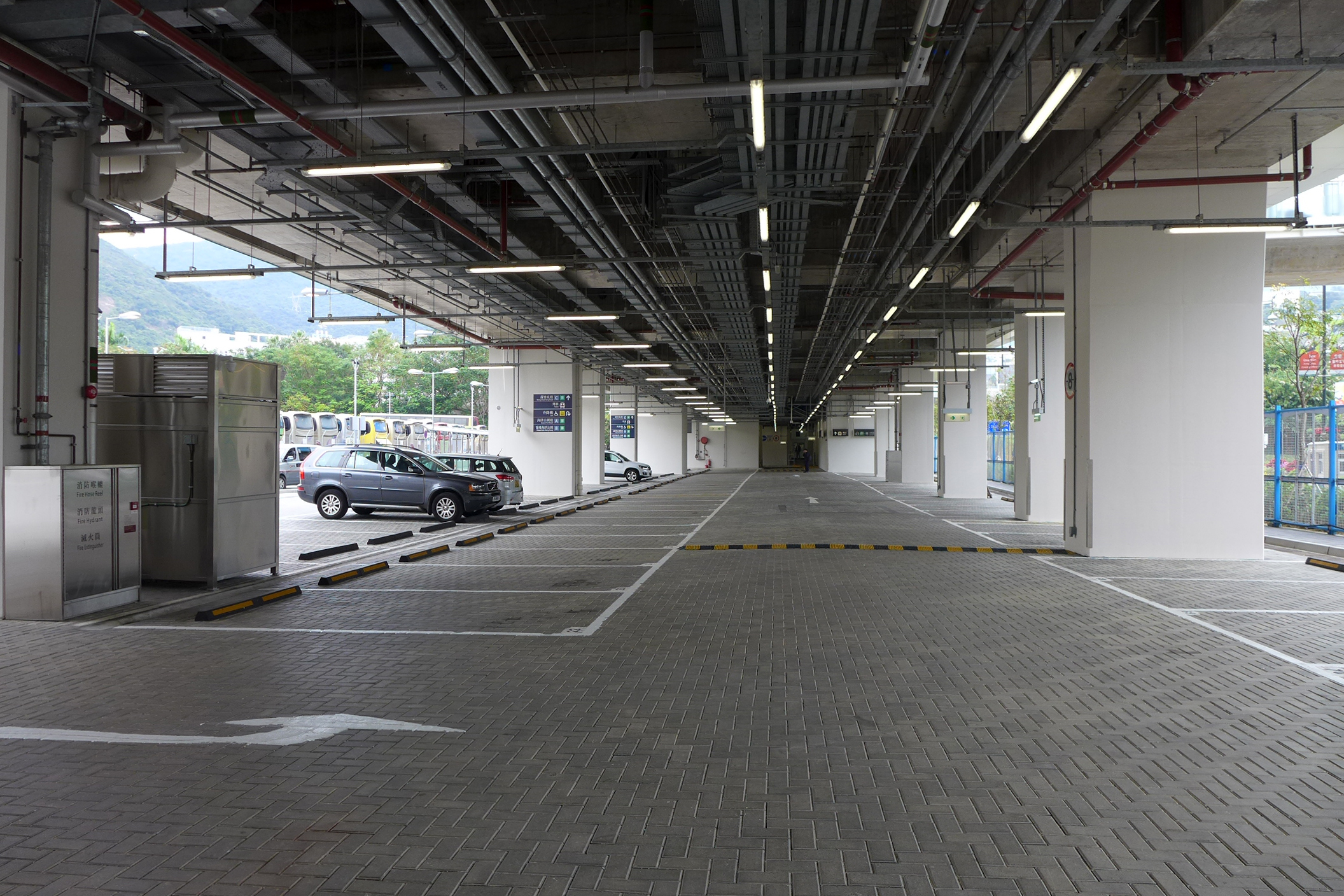
The public car park underneath Ocean Park station.

== Construction ==
=== Construction progress ===
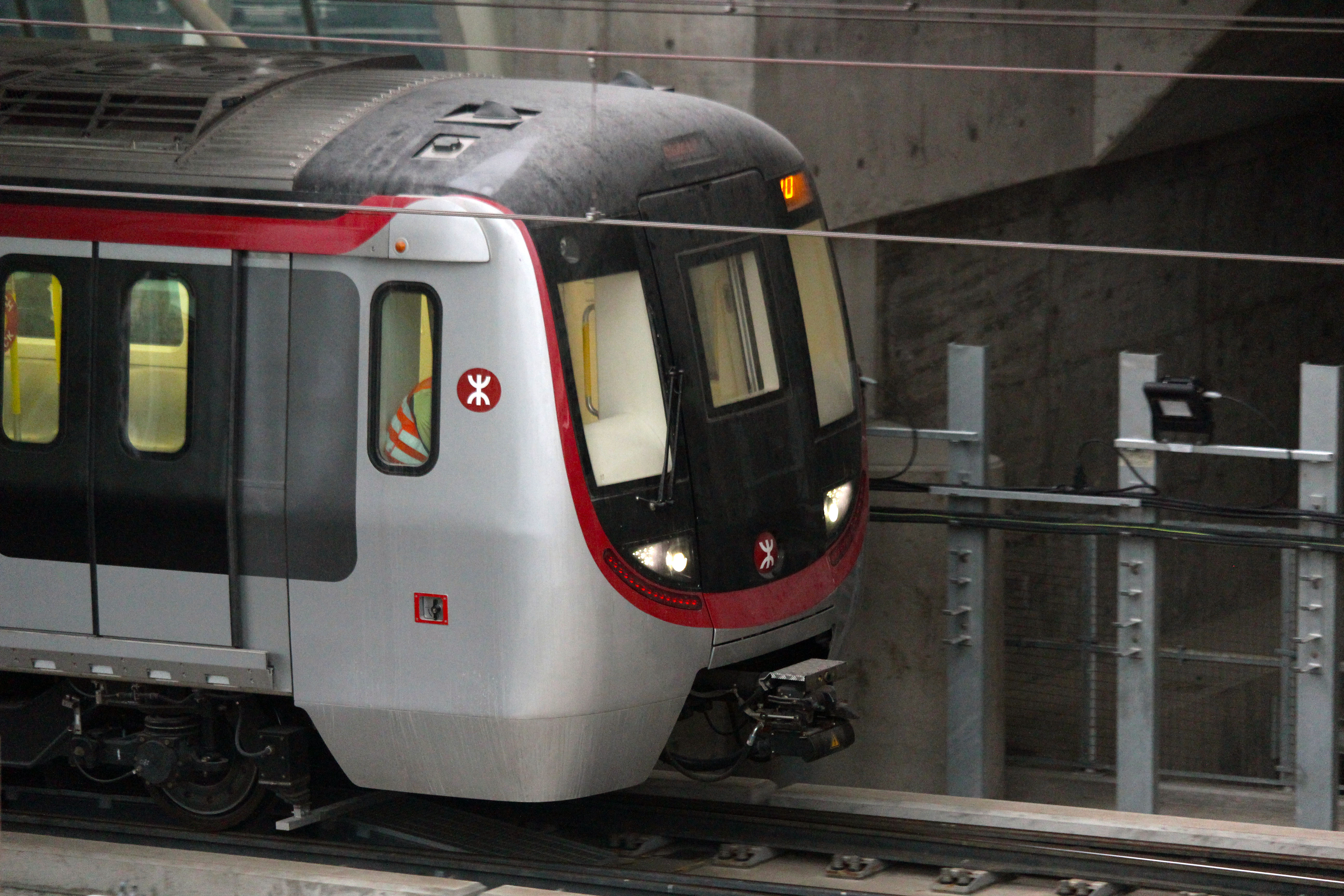
A test train approaching Wong Chuk Hang station in December 2015

Agreements for MTR South Island line and the Kwun Tong line extension were signed by the Hong Kong government and MTR Corporation on 18 May 2011. In August 2012, drilling and blasting work began for constructing the Nam Fung Tunnel, between Admiralty and Ocean Park stations. The line was built by a Leighton Asia – John Holland Group joint venture.

On 9 December 2013, structural work for Ocean Park station was completed. The first 3-car trainset arrived at MTR Siu Ho Wan Depot on 19 February 2014. The project was 78% complete by late September 2014, and Nam Fung Tunnel was broken through on 17 October. In 2015, trial runs began between Wong Chuk Hang and South Horizons stations. 84% of construction work was completed by the end of February 2015. Work in Lei Tung station was prolonged by geological problems.

=== Delayed opening ===
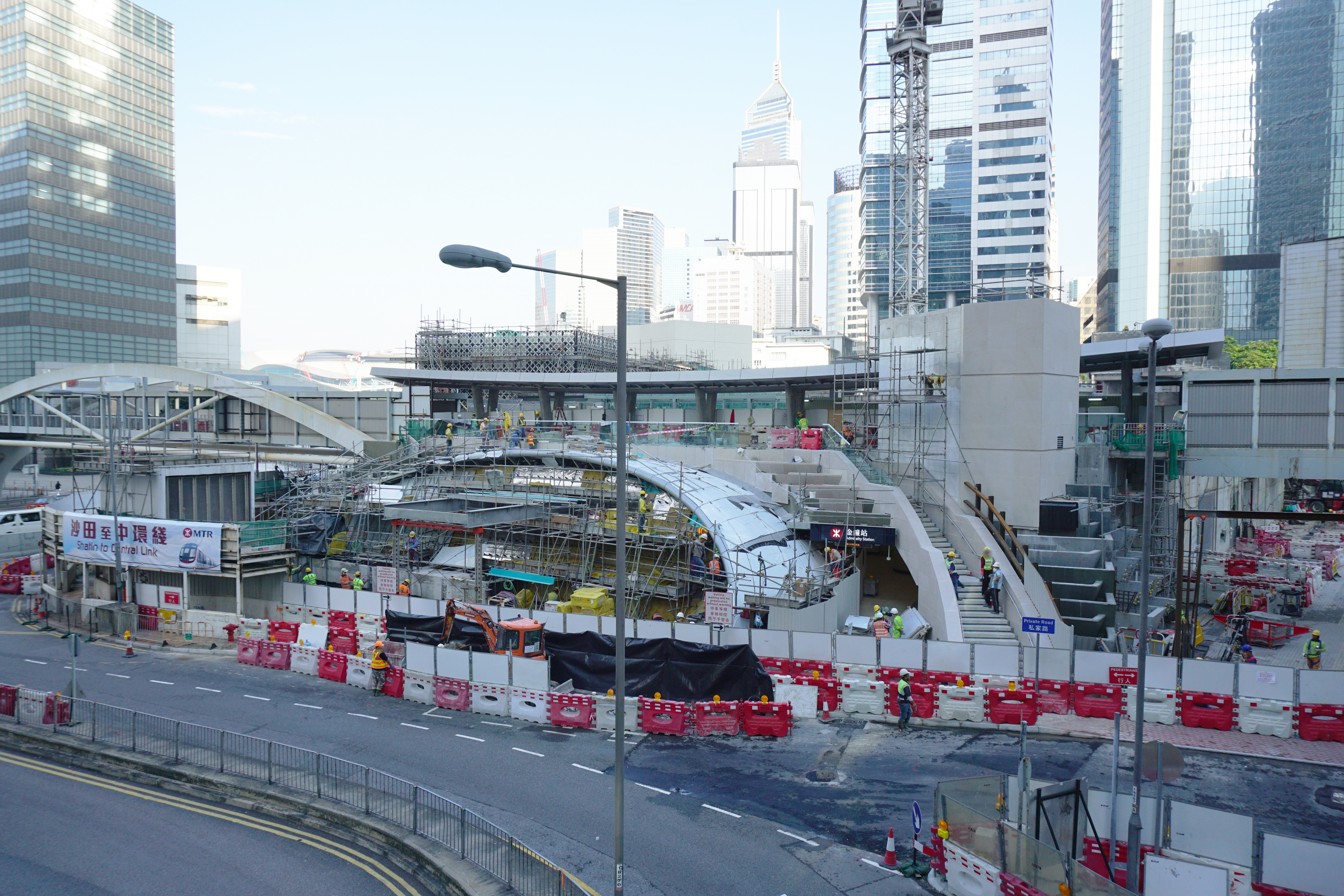
Expansion works at Admiralty station in November 2016. Underground are a new concourse, and the platforms of the South Island line and the North South Corridor. Harcourt Garden will be restored as a podium garden after the completion of the work.

The opening of the South Island line was originally planned for 2015. On 21 May 2014, an informant told Apple Daily that the commencement date of the line would be postponed by one and a half years. MTR Corporation asserted it would be opened as expected. Yet, the Transport and Housing Bureau revealed the delay of construction work and demanded MTR to review the commencement. Members of the Legislative Council and District Council criticised MTR for hiding the project's progress from the public and demanded a progress report at the Council's meeting. Eight days later at the South District Council meeting, MTRC announced the delay was caused by the expansion work of Admiralty station. High-density building, underground public facilities and the existing Admiralty station would prolong the work progress, as "safety comes first". However, the claimed 2015 opening date remained unchanged. In November 2014, a revised opening date of December 2016 was announced.

In October 2016, MTRC chairman Frederick Ma warned that the opening of the South Island line could be delayed by three more months. However, on 10 November 2016, he announced the South Island line would open by the end of 2016, saying the engineering team overcame the many challenges in expanding Admiralty Station. Finally, MTRC chief executive Lincoln Leong officially declared the South Island line would begin operation on 28 December 2016.

== Commencement ==
On 28 December, before South Horizons station opened, many residents and enthusiasts gathered outside the entrance. MTR managerial officials, including CEO Lincoln Leong, welcomed passengers and rode on the first departure. The first train departed from South Horizons station at 5:55 am, five minutes earlier than usual. After 11 hours of operation, there had been over 92,000 passenger journeys. However, the day after the line opened, an electrical fault triggered power outages at 2:15 pm, causing lighting systems, escalators, elevators, and fare gates to stop working. The driverless trains were switched into manual mode in order to maintain service. Normal operation resumed after half an hour.

=== Interchange stations ===
At Admiralty, a new island platform was built under Harcourt Garden. Transfer passages connect the new station area with the older Tsuen Wan line and Island line platforms, as well as the East Rail line platforms.

At Wong Chuk Hang, the platform structure was planned to be a double island platform with three tracks (like Choi Hung station). South Island line (West) trains would use the centre track while South Island line trains would use those on each side, allowing for convenient cross-platform interchanges. However, according to the final plan, any future South Island line (West) platforms were to be built above the existing platforms.

== See also ==
- Future projects of the MTR
