= South Island line (West) =

Planned Hong Kong MTR extension

South Island line (West) 南港島綫（西段）

Overview
- Owner: MTR Corporation
- Locale: Districts: Central and Western, Southern
- Termini: Wong Chuk Hang; HKU
- Stations: 7

Service
- Type: Rapid transit
- System: MTR
- Operator: MTR Corporation

History
- Work began: 2027 (proposed)
- Planned opening: 2034 (proposed)

Technical
- Track gauge: 1,435 mm (4 ft 8 1/2 in)

The South Island line (West) is an extension of the Hong Kong MTR metro system currently under planning. The new line will serve the southwestern coast of Hong Kong Island, between Shek Tong Tsui and Wong Chuk Hang. Plans for the South Island line (West) are mentioned and revised in the Government's Railway Development Strategy 2014 (RDS-2014) report. and construction was planned to begin in 2021–2026 in the report. The Government officially gave approval to start detailed planning and design work in 2025.

Like the existing South Island line, this line would connect the Southern District to the rest of the MTR network.

== History ==
System map of South Island line (West) in 2014 proposal

The idea of connecting the Southern District of Hong Kong was proposed as early as the 1980s. The Government proposed the southward extension of then-planned East Kowloon Line to Aberdeen from Sheung Wan in 1989. Four years later the transport authorities published a consultative document that proposed the construction of two South Island lines interchanging at Tin Wan: vertical running from Admiralty to Lei Tung via Tin Wan and Ap Lei Chau, and horizontal from Telegraph Bay (now Cyberport) to Ocean Park via Wah Fu Estate, Wah Kwai, Tin Wan, Aberdeen, and Wong Chuk Hang. It was also deemed there is no urgency for the project considering the road system is considered to be sufficient. A same conclusion was reached in 1999 study except moving the proposed northern terminus to Sheung Wan station.

In the Railway Development Strategy (RDS) 2000, South Island line was included in the long-term development list, but was abandoned to fully consider the alignment of the line. The Government had pledged multiple times to implement the scheme, including in 2007 announcing the construction to start in 2011, in 2013 to start in 2015, and in 2014 to start in 2021. The project was in early planning stages by 2023, when the Transport and Logistics Bureau confirmed that the commission of the line would depend on the reconstruction of Wah Fu Estate in 2027.

In 2025, the Government officially gave approval to start detailed planning and design work on the South Island Line. Construction work is to begin in 2027, with a targeted completion date of 2034.

== Stations ==
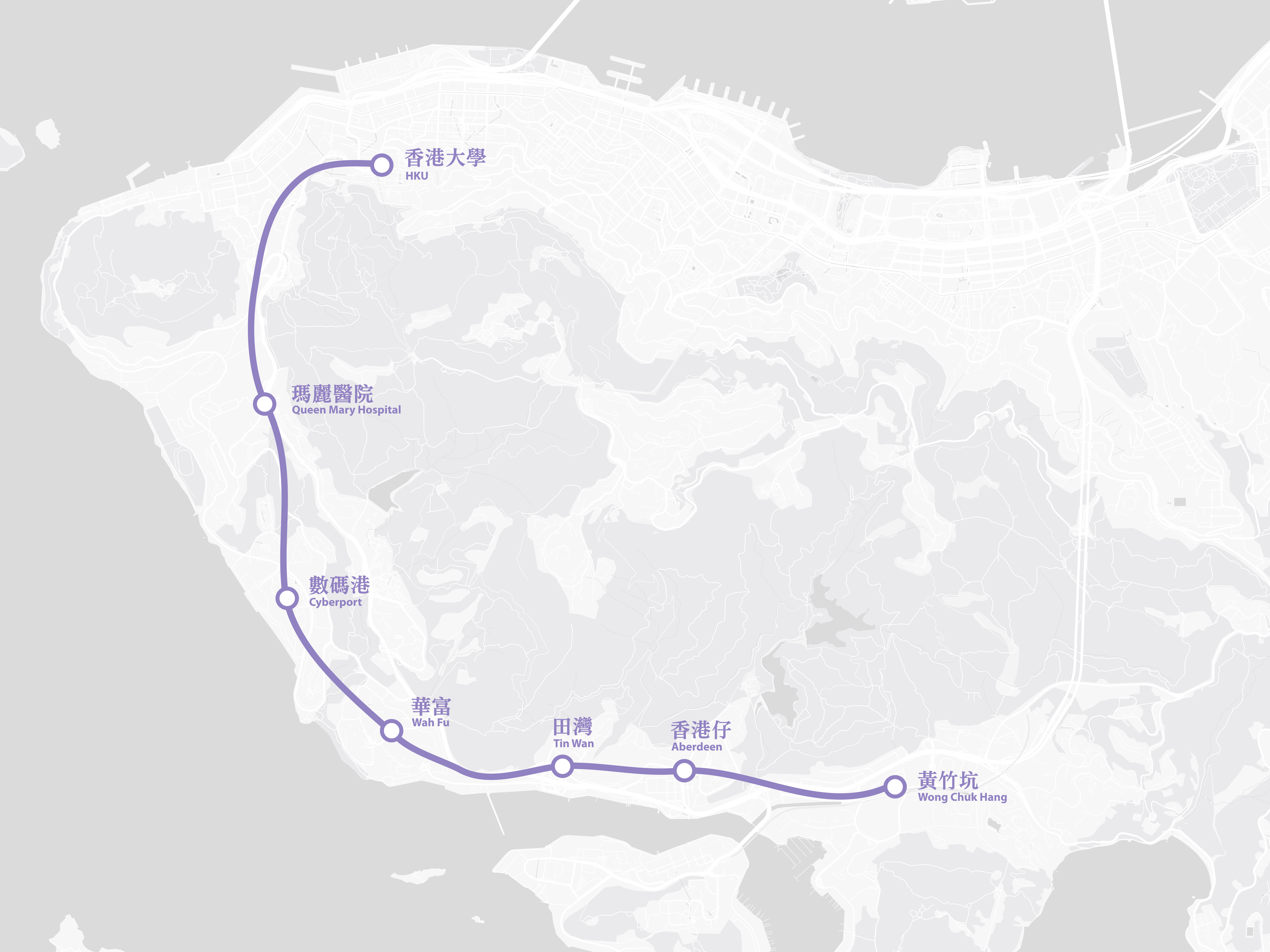
Geographical map of the proposed stations but Wah Kwai Station is not in this map.

The following is a list of the stations on the South Island line (West), including HKU, QMH, Cyberport, Wah Fu, Wah Kwai, Tin Wan, Aberdeen and Wong Chuk Hang.

Livery and Station Name			Connections	Opening date	District
English		Chinese	Connections	Opening date	District
Light Green, Mint	HKU	香港大學	Island line	28 December 2014 (Note: Originally opened as part of the Island line.)	Central and Western
Light Pink, Rose	Queen Mary Hospital (QMH)	瑪麗醫院		(Proposed stations)	Southern
Blue	Cyberport	數碼港		(Proposed stations)	Southern
Red-Orange, Vermillion	Wah Fu	華富		(Proposed stations)	Southern
Dark Cyan, Teal or Turquoise	Wah Kwai	華貴		(Proposed stations)	Southern
Light Green, Lime	Tin Wan	田灣		(Proposed stations)	Southern
Light Purple, Lavender	Aberdeen	香港仔		(Proposed stations)	Southern
Yellow	Wong Chuk Hang	黃竹坑	South Island line	28 December 2016 (Note: Originally opened as part of the South Island line.)	Southern

== See also ==
- Future projects of the MTR
