= Ocean Park station =

MTR station on Hong Kong Island

Ocean Park 海洋公園
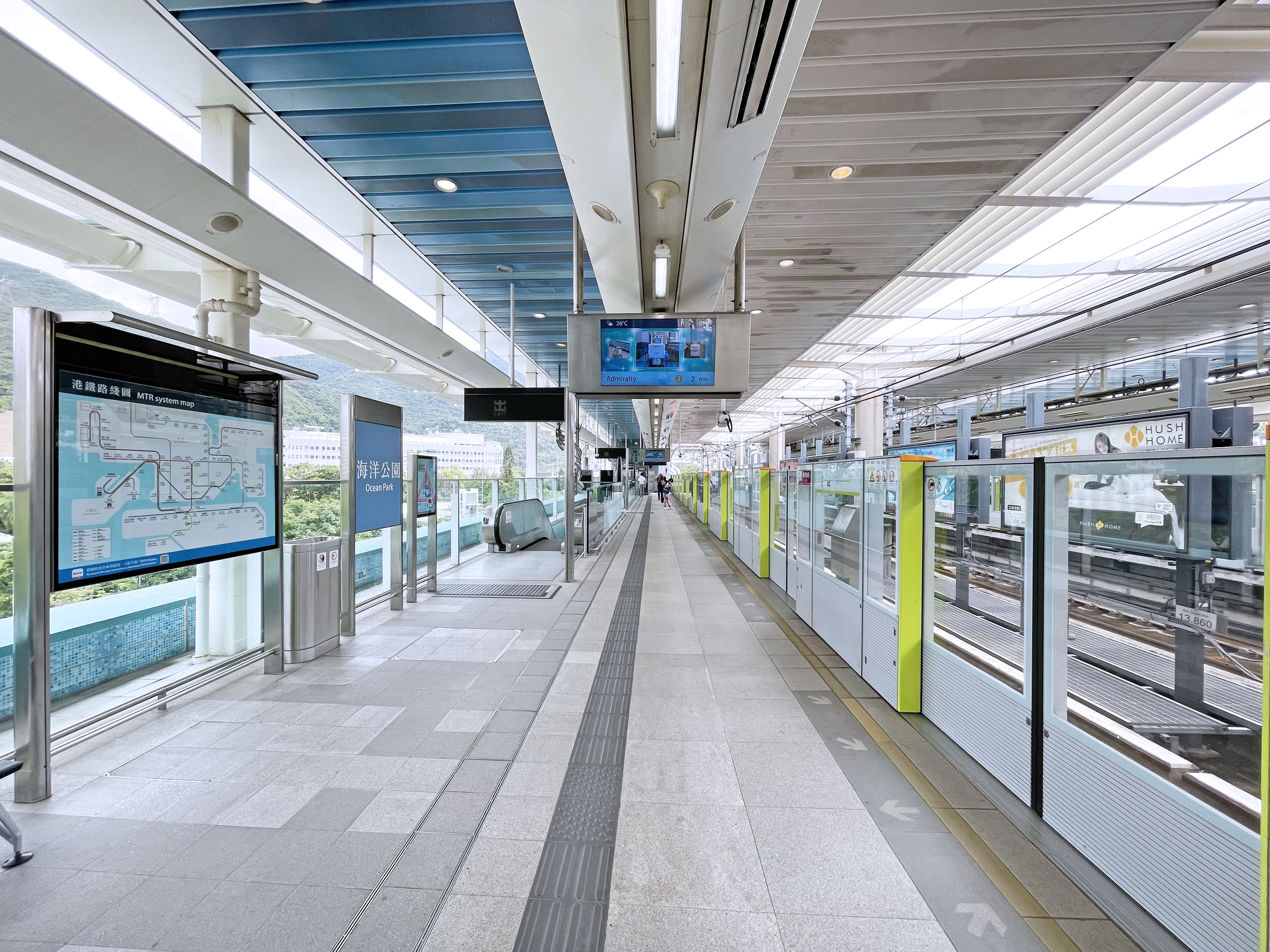

Chinese name
- Traditional Chinese: 海洋公園
- Simplified Chinese: 海洋公园
- Cantonese Yale: Hóiyèung Gūngyún
Transcriptions
Standard Mandarin
- Hanyu Pinyin: Hǎiyáng Gōngyuán
Yue: Cantonese
- Yale Romanization: Hóiyèung Gūngyún

General information
- Location: Wong Chuk Hang; Southern District, Hong Kong
- Coordinates: 22°14′55″N 114°10′27″E
- System: MTR rapid transit station
- Owner: MTR Corporation
- Operator: MTR Corporation
- Line: South Island line
- Platforms: 2 side platforms
- Tracks: 2

Construction
- Structure type: Elevated
- Accessible: Yes

Other information
- Station code: OCP

History
- Opened: 28 December 2016; 9 years ago

Services
Preceding station	MTR	Following station
Admiralty Terminus	South Island line	Wong Chuk Hang towards South Horizons
Track layout
Location
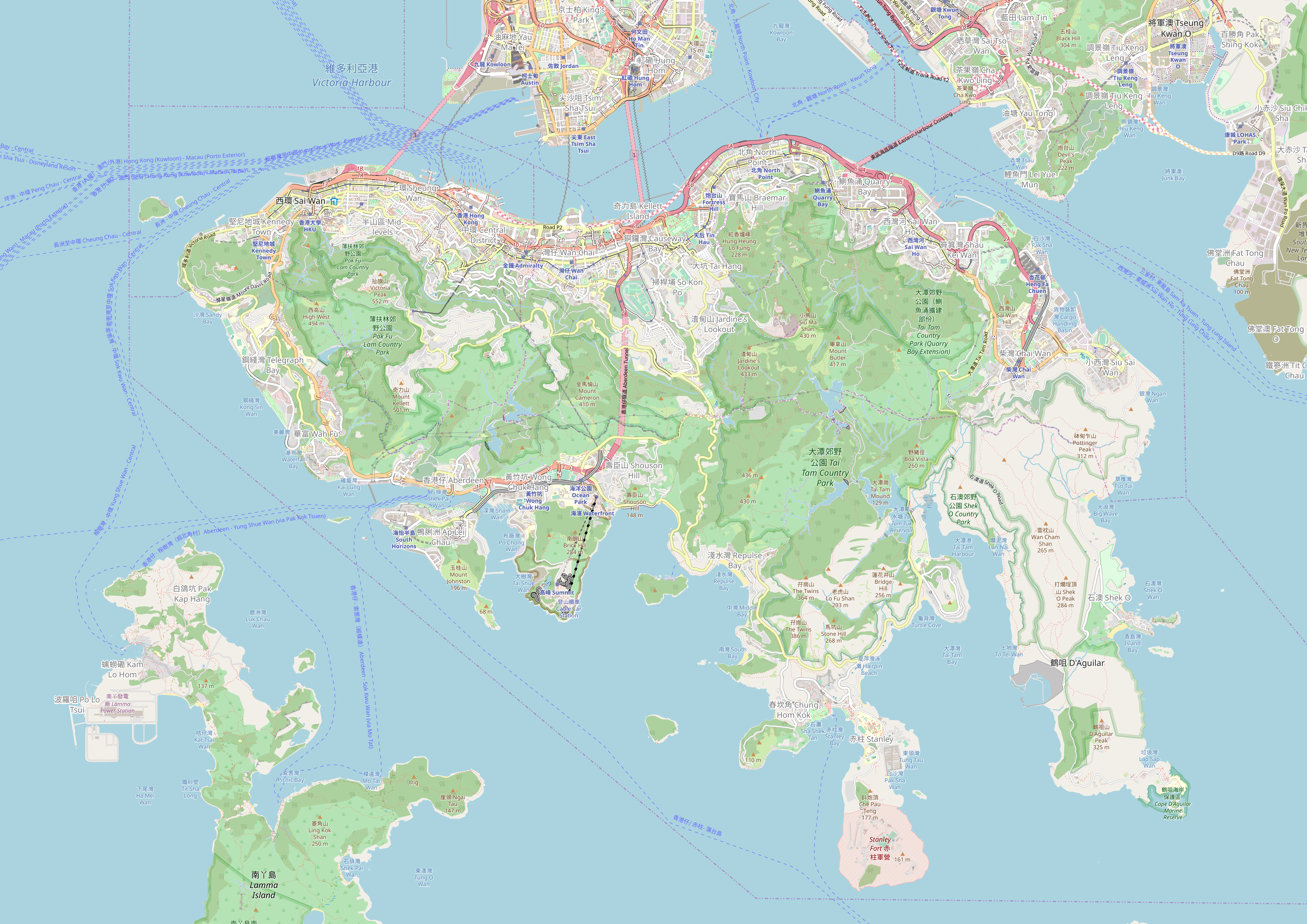
- Location within MTR Location within Hong Kong Island

Ocean Park (Chinese: 海洋公園; Cantonese Yale: Hóiyèung Gūngyún) is an MTR rapid transit station in Hong Kong on the eastern section of the South Island line, which serves Ocean Park Hong Kong and Wong Chuk Hang. The station opened on 28 December 2016 with the rest of the South Island line.

It takes around 10 minutes to travel from Admiralty to Ocean Park station, which is 21 minutes faster than taking the Citybus route 629 from Admiralty station to Hong Kong Ocean Park.

The station is built above ground, north of Ocean Park Road, above the Ocean Park Bus Depot. A footbridge links the station with the park entrance. The station has three entrances/exits.

== History ==
The station was constructed under Contract 903, which included the construction of both Ocean Park and Wong Chuk Hang stations as well as the Aberdeen Channel Bridge. The contract was awarded to Leighton Asia in May 2011.

Ocean Park station opened on 28 December 2016 along with the rest of the South Island Line.

== Station Art ==
The station features glass in different shades of blue, in wavy tile bands, as the main decoration. About 2,700 square metres (29,000 ft^{2}) of the concourse is coloured blue, with the pillars adorned with depictions of seals, penguins, jellyfish and dolphins and other marine life.

On the ceiling is Flow, a hanging art installation created by Benson Kwun; this installation resembles a school of fish swimming through the air.

== Station layout ==
U2; Platforms	Side platform, doors will open on the left
U2; Platforms	Platform 2	South Island line towards Admiralty (Terminus) →
U2; Platforms	Platform 1	← South Island line towards South Horizons (Wong Chuk Hang)
U2; Platforms	Side platform, doors will open on the left
U1	Concourse	Customer service, MTRShops, footbridge to Ocean Park
G	Street level	Exits, park-and-ride facility

This elevated station has two tracks and two side platforms. Aedas, as part of the engineering team led by Atkins, is the architect for the station. The station was completed in October 2015, but opened with the rest of the South Island line East on 28 December 2016.

Ocean Park is the second MTR station serving a theme park, after Disneyland Resort.

A park-and-ride facility is adjacent to the station.

=== Entrances/exits ===
Ocean Park station has three entrances/exits:

- A: Ocean Park Public Transport Interchange, Ocean Park Road, Nam Fung Road (1 lift)
- B: Footbridge to Ocean Park Hong Kong main entrance
- C: Wong Chuk Hang Road, to Shouson Hill (1 lift)
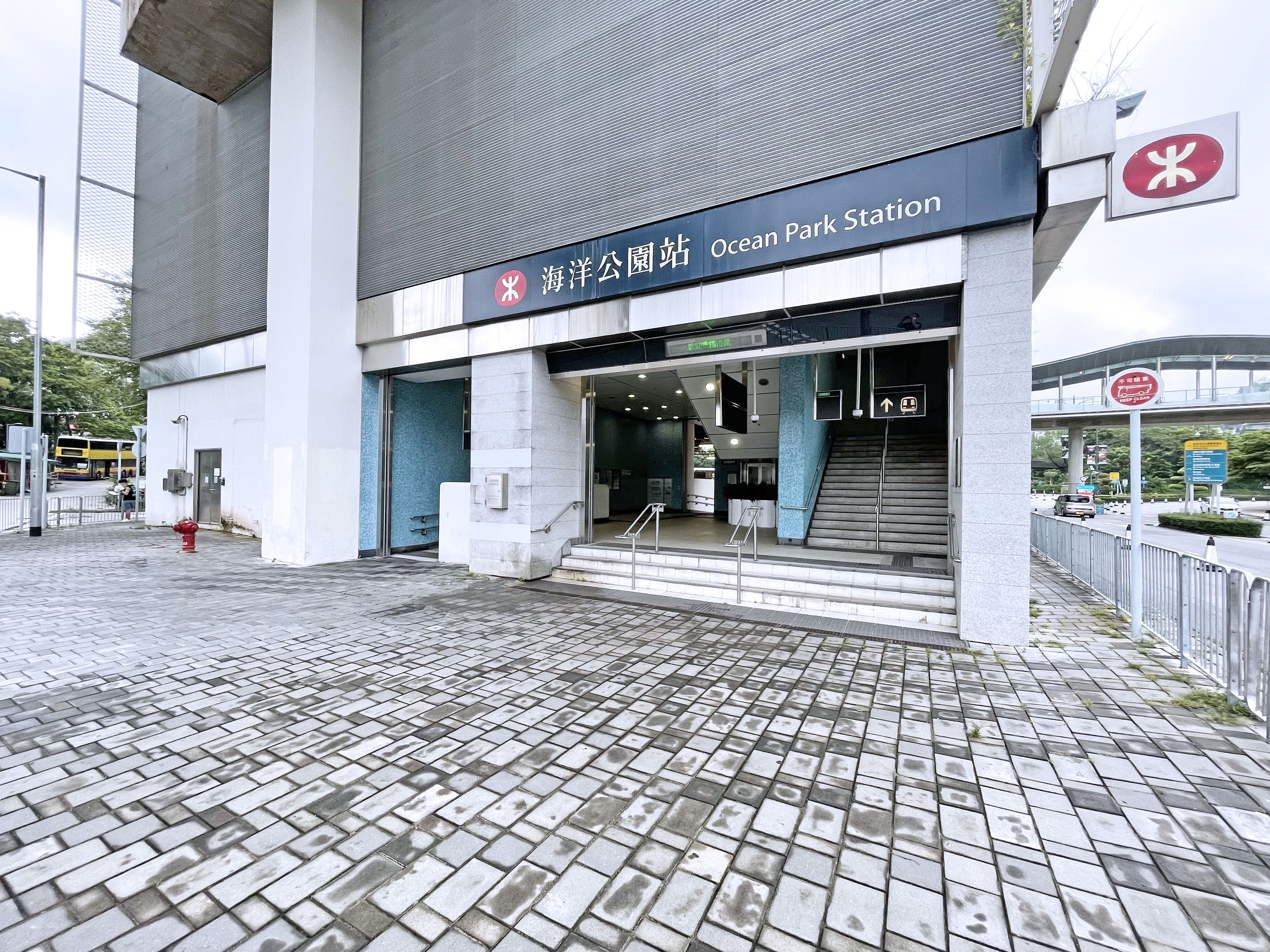
Exit A

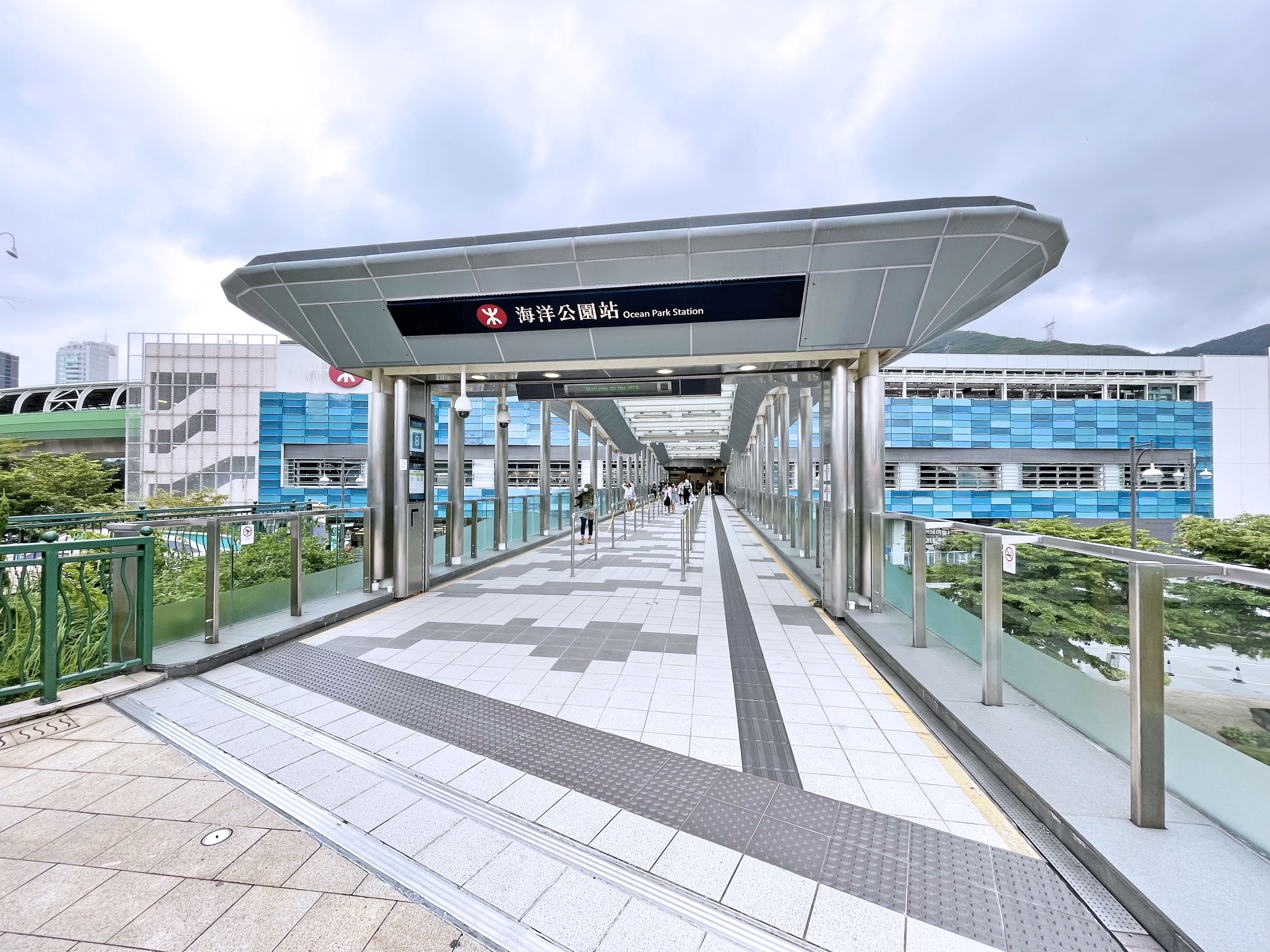
Exit B

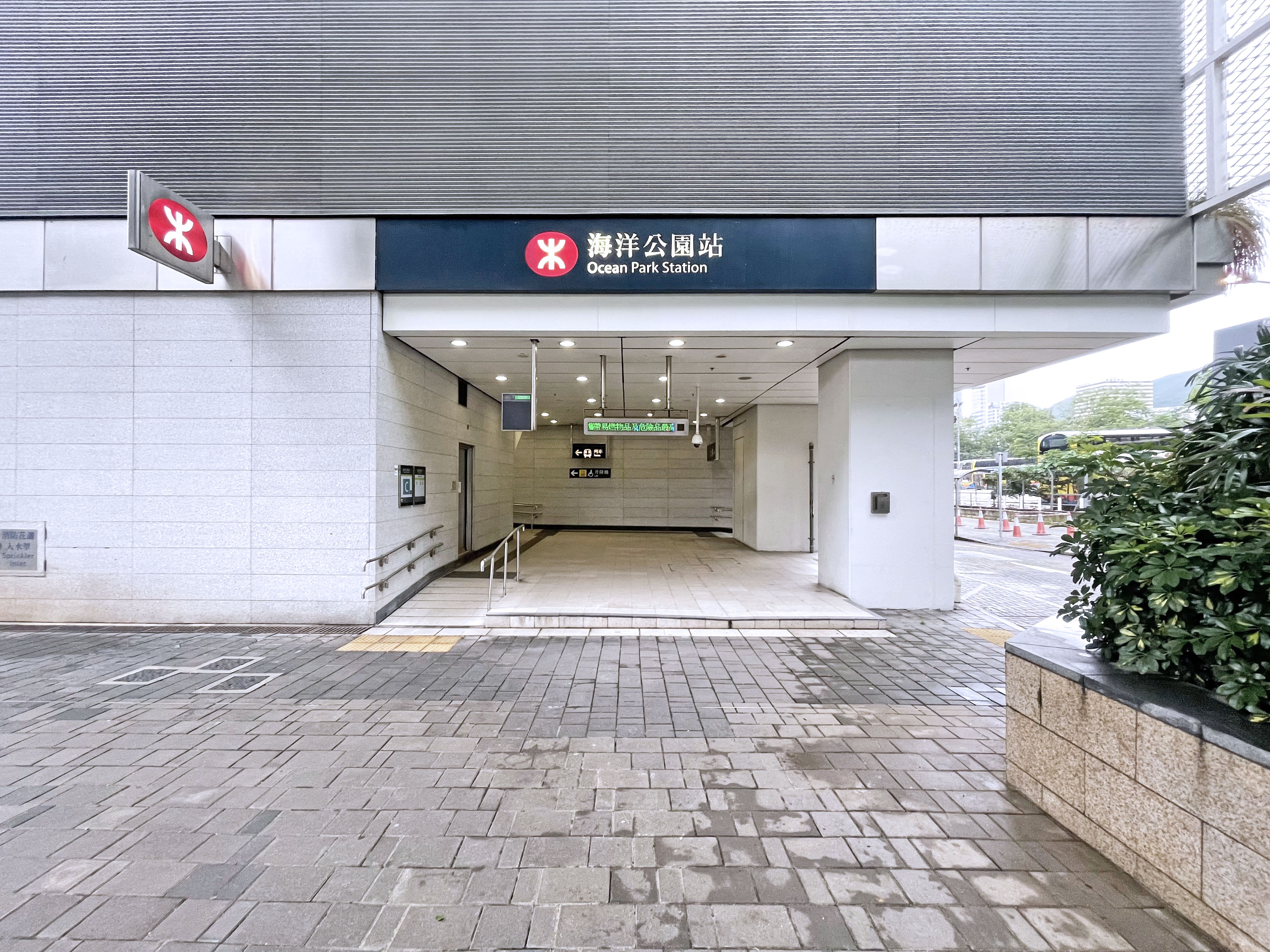
Exit C

== Gallery ==
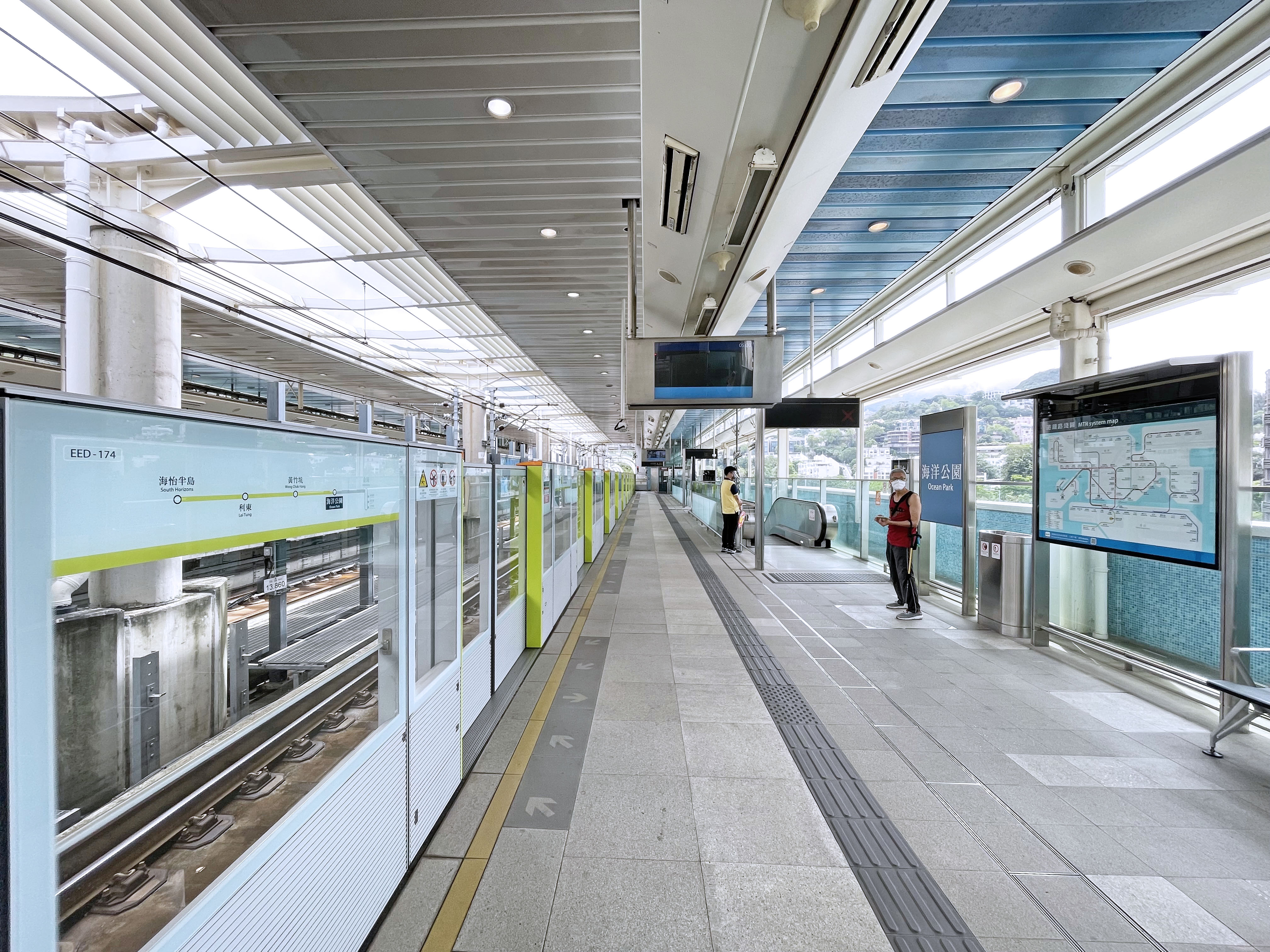
Platform 1 to South Horizons

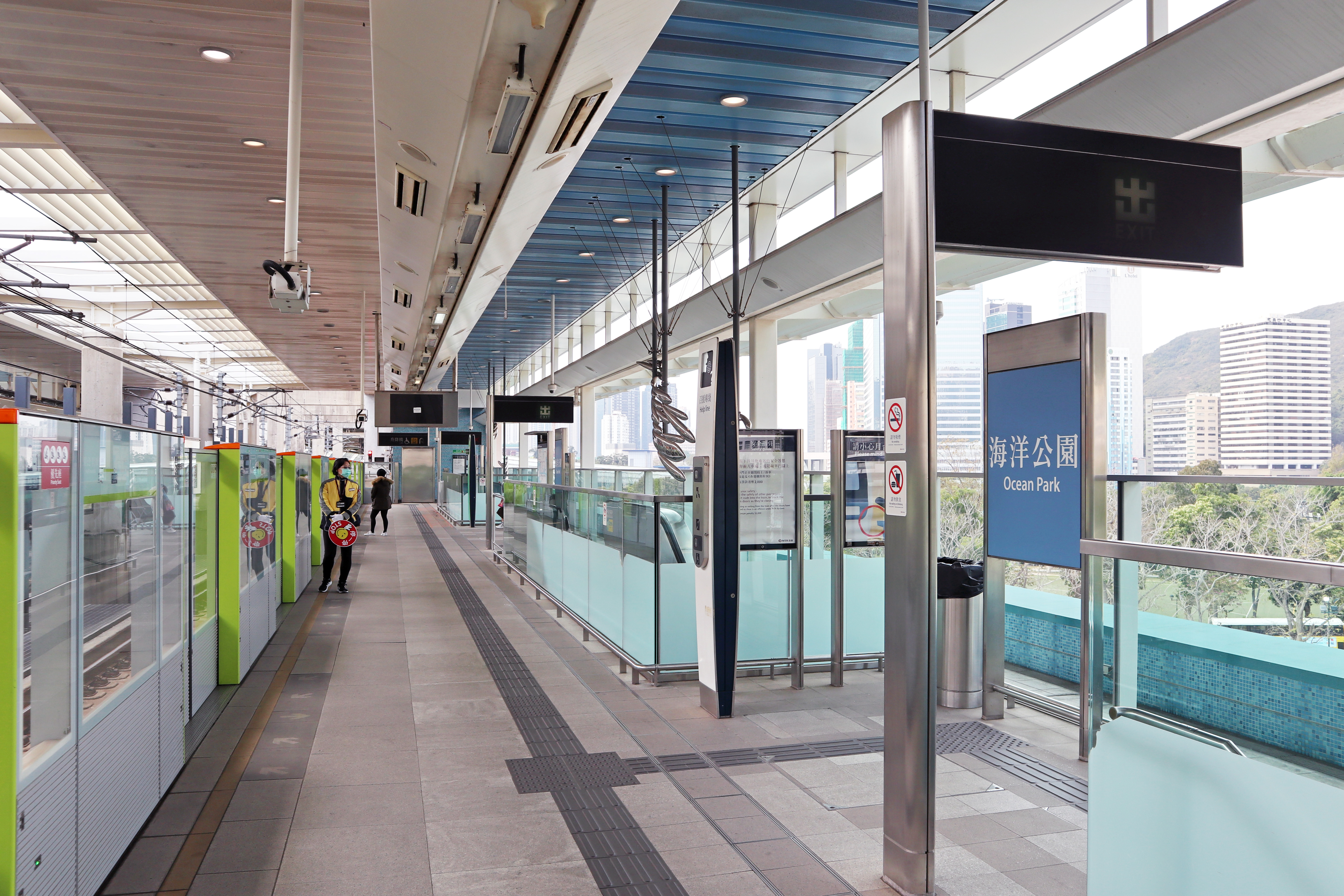
Platform 2 to Admiralty
