= Wong Chuk Hang station =

MTR station on Hong Kong Island

Wong Chuk Hang 黃竹坑
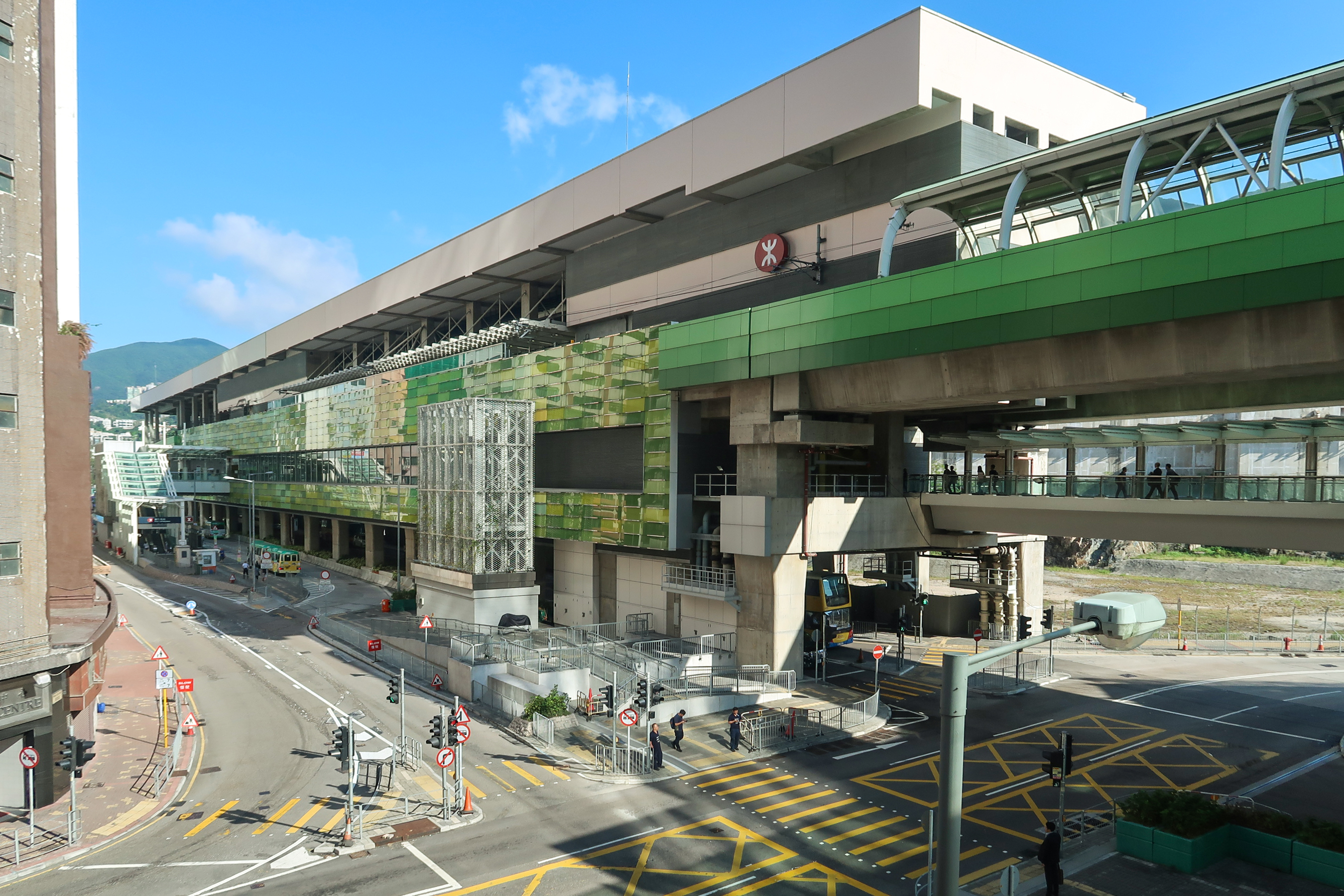
- Wong Chuk Hang station in 2018

Chinese name
- Traditional Chinese: 黃竹坑
- Simplified Chinese: 黄竹坑
- Cantonese Yale: Wòngjūkhāang
- Jyutping: Wong^{4}zuk^{1}haang^{1}
- Literal meaning: Yellow Bamboo Pit
Transcriptions
Standard Mandarin
- Hanyu Pinyin: Huángzhúkēng
Yue: Cantonese
- Yale Romanization: Wòngjūkhāang
- Jyutping: Wong^{4}zuk^{1}haang^{1}

General information
- Location: Staunton Creek; Southern District, Hong Kong
- Coordinates: 22°14′53″N 114°10′05″E
- System: MTR rapid transit station
- Owner: MTR Corporation
- Operator: MTR Corporation
- Lines: South Island line; South Island (West) (proposed)
- Platforms: 2 (1 island platform)
- Tracks: 2

Construction
- Structure type: Elevated
- Accessible: Yes

Other information
- Station code: WCH

History
- Opened: 28 December 2016; 9 years ago

Services
Preceding station	MTR	Following station
Ocean Park towards Admiralty	South Island line	Lei Tung towards South Horizons
Planned
Aberdeen towards HKU	South Island line (West)	Terminus
Track layout
Location
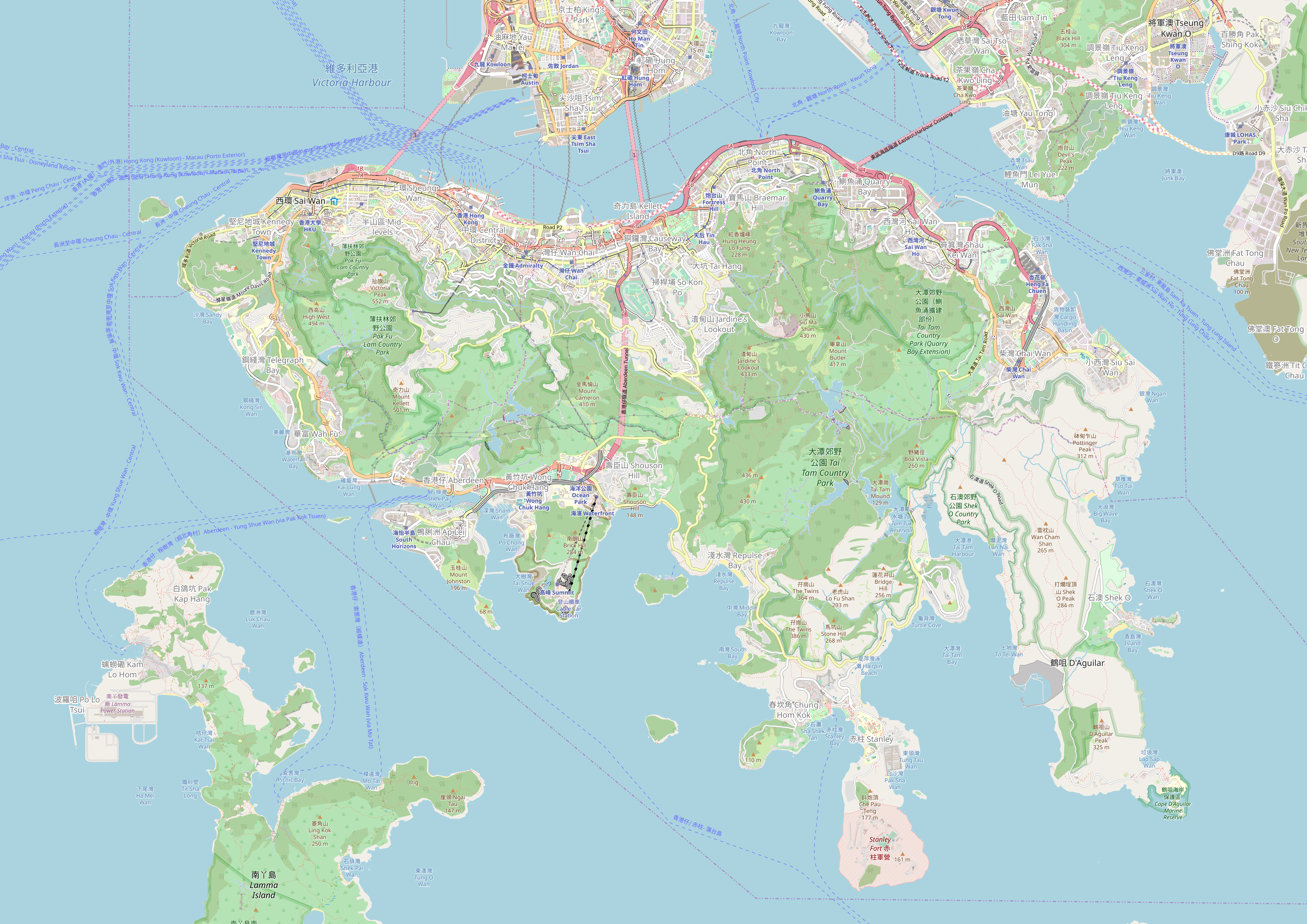
- Location within MTR Location within Hong Kong Island

Wong Chuk Hang (Chinese: 黃竹坑) is an elevated MTR rapid transit station in Hong Kong on the eastern section of the South Island line, built on the Staunton Creek Nullah and off the old site of Wong Chuk Hang Estate in Staunton Creek (Chung Mei). The station opened on 28 December 2016 with the rest of the South Island line. Its livery is yellow for the concourse and cream for the platforms.

It is named after the locality of the same name further east and serves residents in that area. The station is connected to a public transport interchange on a widened section of Heung Yip Road. A network of footbridges serves future commercial and residential areas, and the station exists as a hub to the Shum Wan area as a whole. The South Island line depot is located to the south.

Wong Chuk Hang is the fourth railway station in the territory to be built on a river, after Tuen Mun and Siu Hong stations on Tuen Mun River, and Long Ping on Yuen Long Nullah.

== History ==
Wong Chuk Hang station was opened on 28 December 2016.

== Station Artwork ==
The station artwork, Huddle by Chao Harn-kae, resembles birds flying.

== Station layout ==
U2; Platforms	Platform 2	South Island line towards Admiralty (Ocean Park) →
U2; Platforms	Island platform, doors will open on the right
U2; Platforms	Platform 1	← South Island line towards South Horizons (Lei Tung)
U1	Concourse	Customer service, MTRShops
U1	Concourse	Footbridges
G	Street level	Exits, public transport interchange
G	Depot	Wong Chuk Hang Depot

This elevated station has two tracks and an island platform. Commissioned by the MTR Corporation, Aedas, as part of the engineering team led by Atkins, were the architect for the station.

=== Entrances/exits ===
A footbridge connection to various areas of Shum Wan is provided. An exit also connects the station to the planned Wong Chuk Hang Station Public Transport Interchange, for passengers to connect to other modes of public transport.

Wong Chuk Hang station has three entrances/exits. Exit B is subdivided into 3 exits and entrances. The footbridge across Wong Chuk Hang Road and Heung Yip Road, connecting the B-prefixed exits, opened on 3 April 2016.

- A1/A2: Public transport interchange in median of Heung Yip Road (1 lift)
- B: Nam Long Shan Road, Wong Chuk Hang Road, Aberdeen, Wong Chuk Hang industrial area, Yip Kan Street, Yip Hing Street (via footbridge) (3 lifts)
- C: The Southside
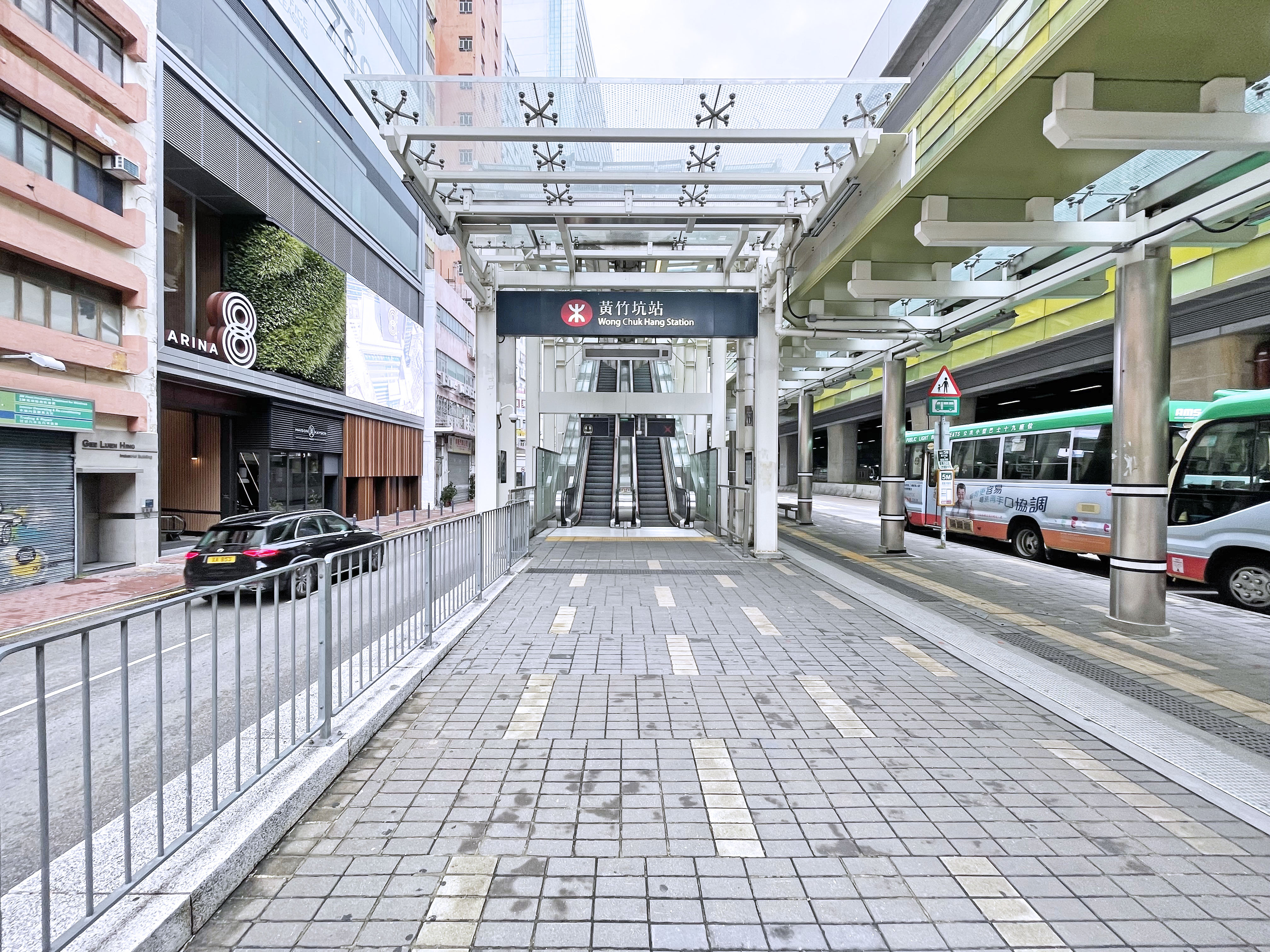
Exit A1

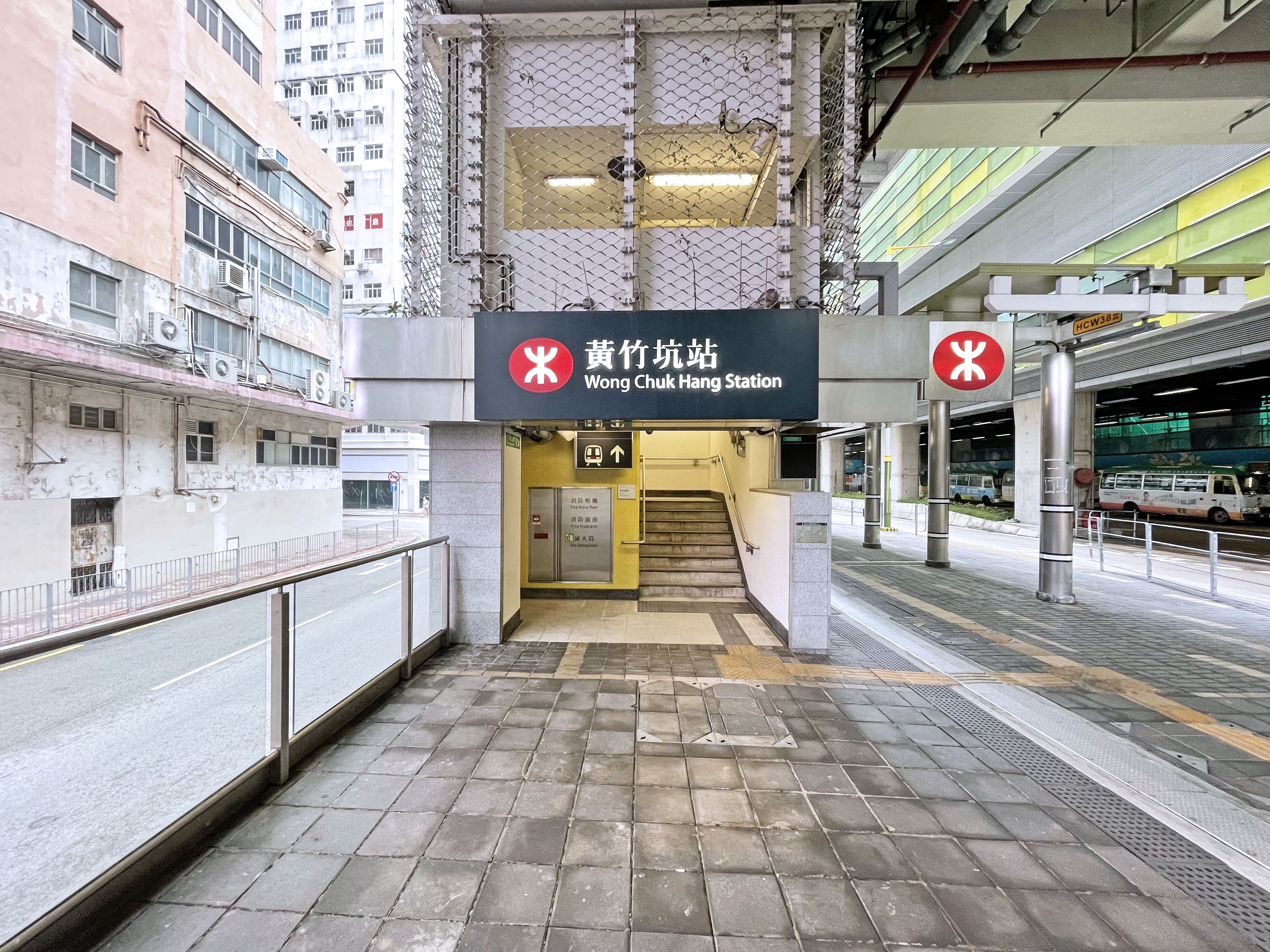
Exit A2

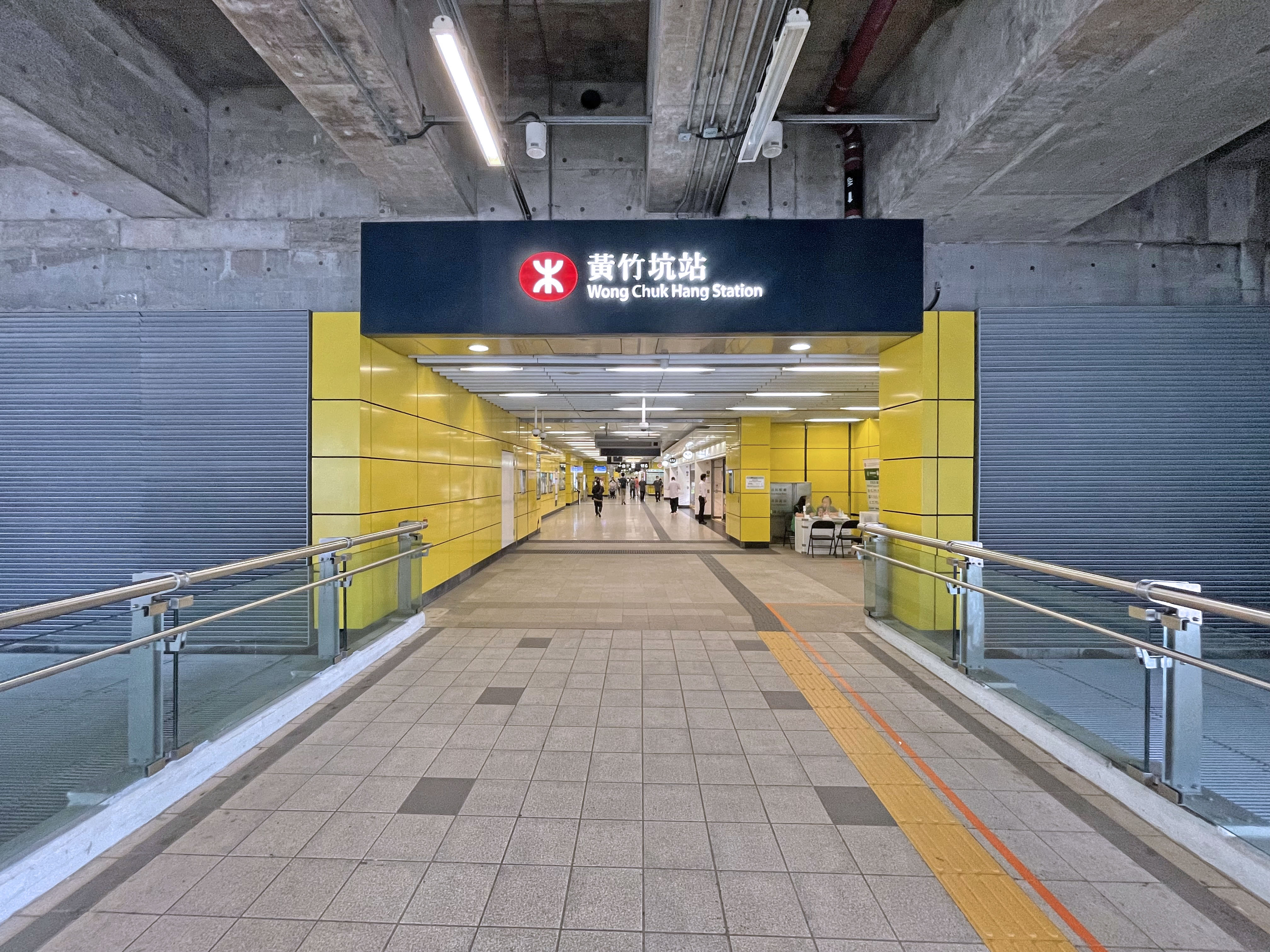
Exit B

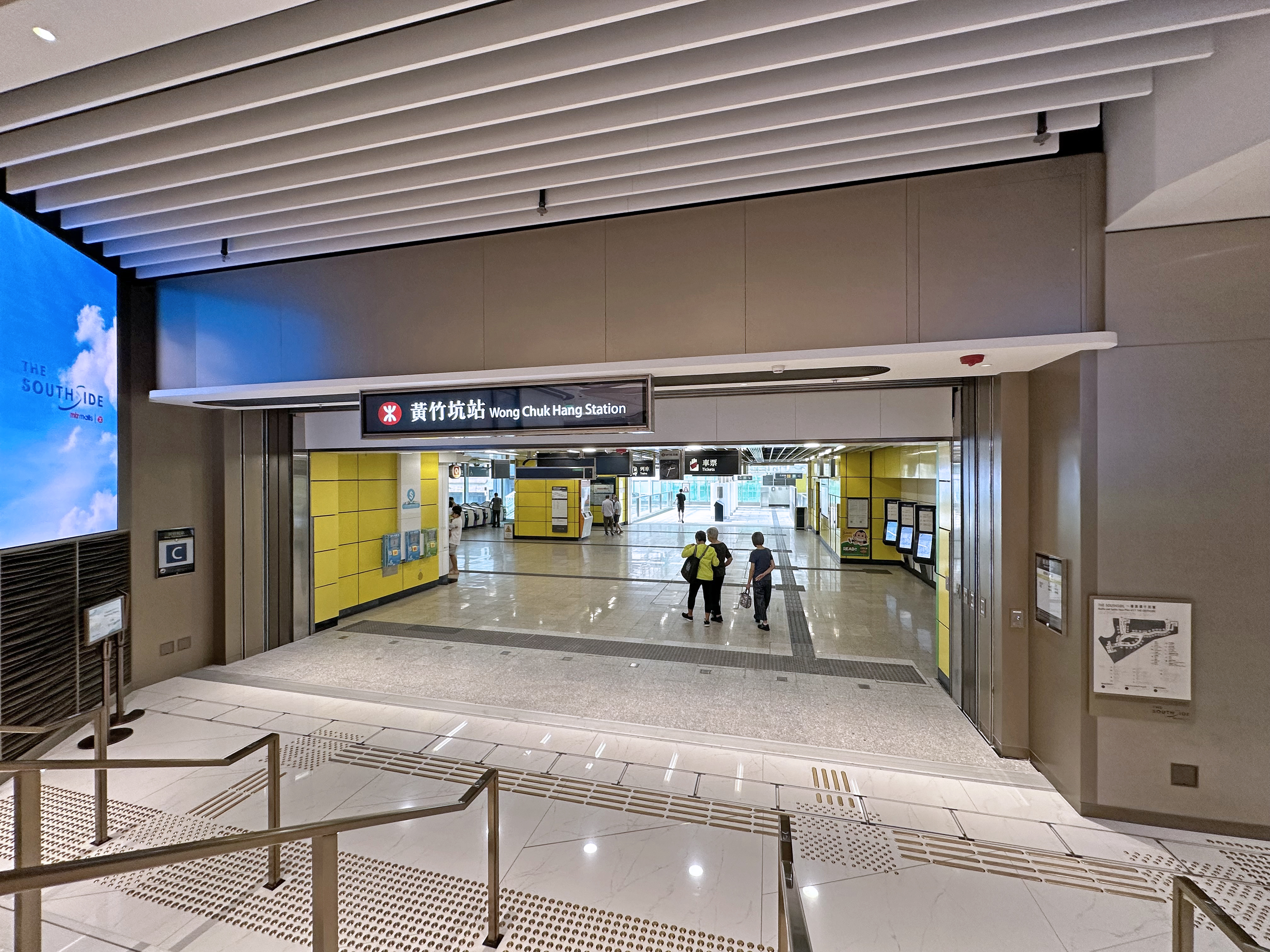
Exit C

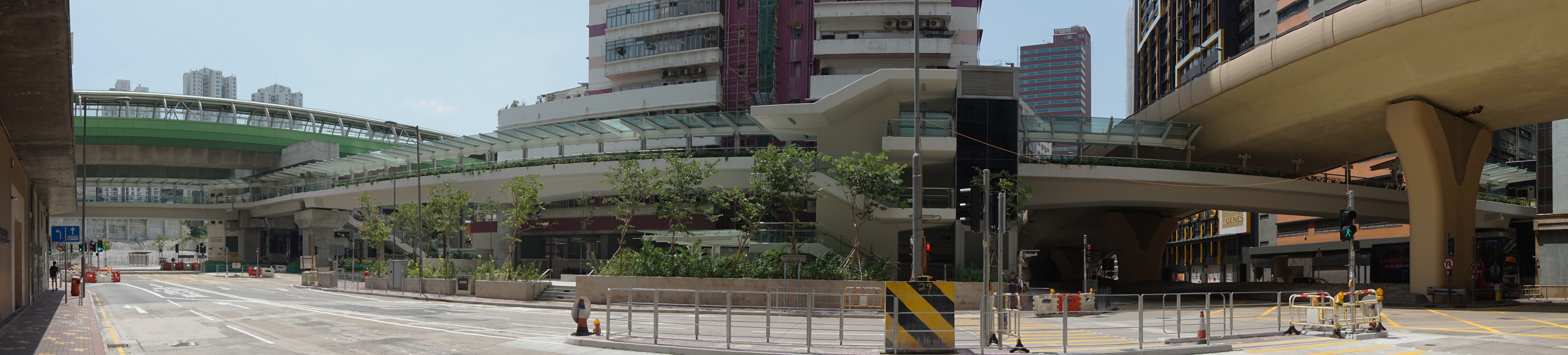
Exit B footbridge

== Wong Chuk Hang Depot ==
While the main station will take up the northern part of the former Wong Chuk Hang Estate site, an underground depot is located to the south. This depot services and maintains South Island line trains. The depot is completely sealed and is situated on sunken ground to avoid noise pollution to areas nearby.

Atop the depot, a residential estate will be developed by the MTR Corporation. It will comprise 14 blocks with about 4,700 flats, as well as a commercial element.

== Future ==
The station is proposed to become an interchange station between the eastern and western sections of the South Island line. The platforms of the South Island line (West) will be built over those of the existing South Island line.
