= Aberdeen Channel Bridge =

Aberdeen Channel Bridge 香港仔海峽大橋
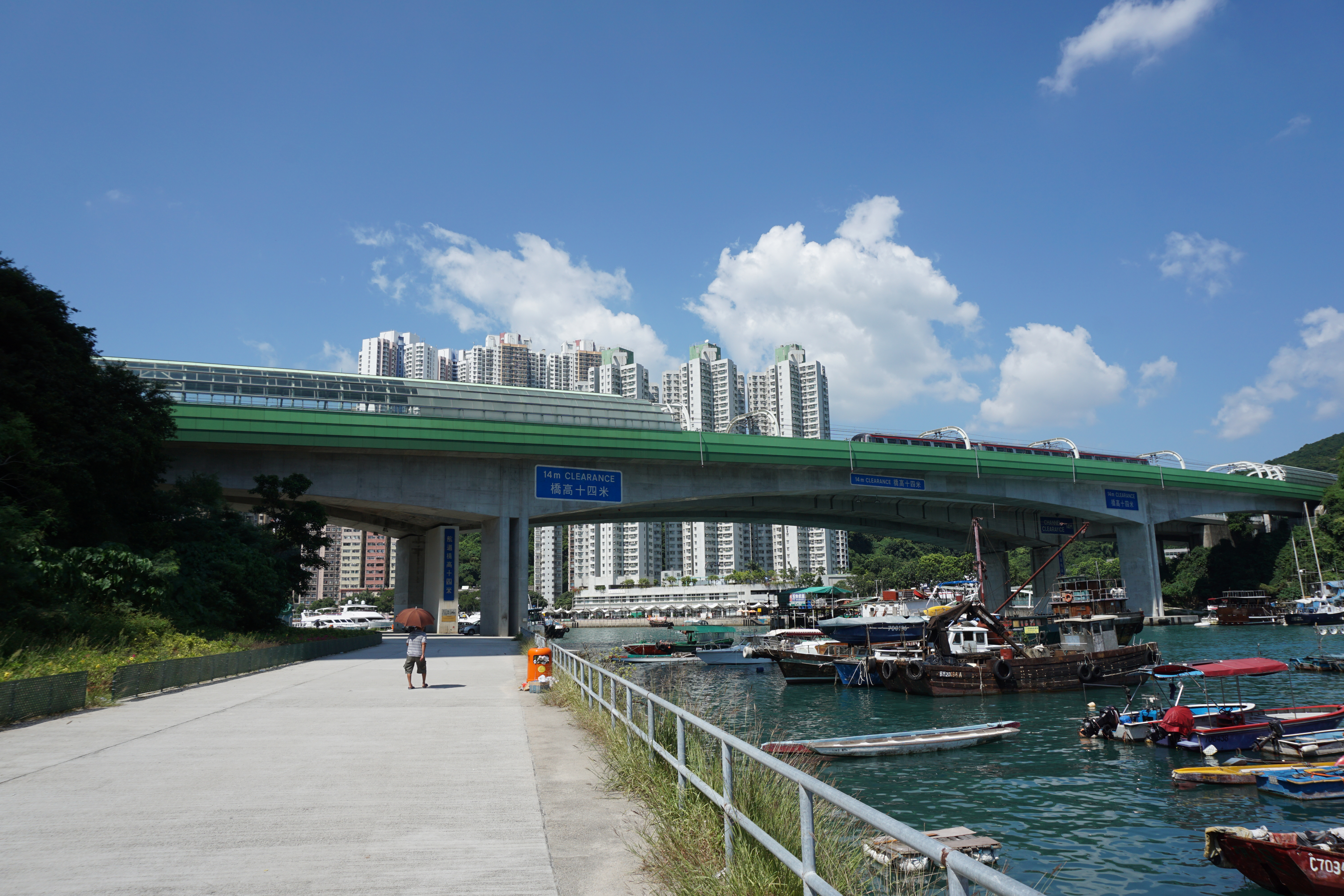
- Aberdeen Channel Bridge
- Coordinates: 22.245456°N 114.159902°E
- Carries: South Island line
- Crosses: Aberdeen Channel
- Locale: Lei Tung station and Wong Chuk Hang station

Characteristics
- Design: Box girder bridge
- Material: Concrete
- Total length: 230 m (750 ft)
- Clearance below: 14 m (46 ft)

History
- Designer: Atkins Global
- Construction start: 2011; 15 years ago
- Construction end: 2015; 11 years ago
- Opened: 28 December 2016; 9 years ago

Statistics
- Toll: Charged by MTR

Location
- Interactive map of Aberdeen Channel Bridge

Aberdeen Channel Bridge
- Traditional Chinese: 香港仔海峽大橋
Transcriptions

The Aberdeen Channel Bridge (Chinese: 香港仔海峽大橋) is a double-track railway bridge in Hong Kong. It carries the MTR's South Island line over the Aberdeen Channel, linking Lei Tung station and Wong Chuk Hang station. Its name reflects the channel the bridge crosses.

The bridge carries one track of traffic in each direction. Construction of the bridge started in 2011 and was initially set to complete in 2015. The actual completion date was delayed by a year and the South Island Line opened on 28 December 2016. This bridge is Ap Lei Chau's only rail connection to Hong Kong Island, before that, the first bridge, Ap Lei Chau Bridge was the only fixed link for long, has been used by road traffic was constructed and put into use since 1980.

== See also ==
- Aberdeen Typhoon Shelters
