= Wong Chuk Hang Estate =

Public housing estate in Wong Chuk Hang, Hong Kong

Coordinates: 22.2453°N 114.1687°E

- Traditional Chinese: 黃竹坑邨
- Simplified Chinese: 黄竹坑村
- Literal meaning: "Yellow Bamboo Pit" Estate
Transcriptions
Standard Mandarin
- Hanyu Pinyin: Huángzhúkēng Cūn
Yue: Cantonese
- Jyutping: Wong4zuk1haang1 cyun1

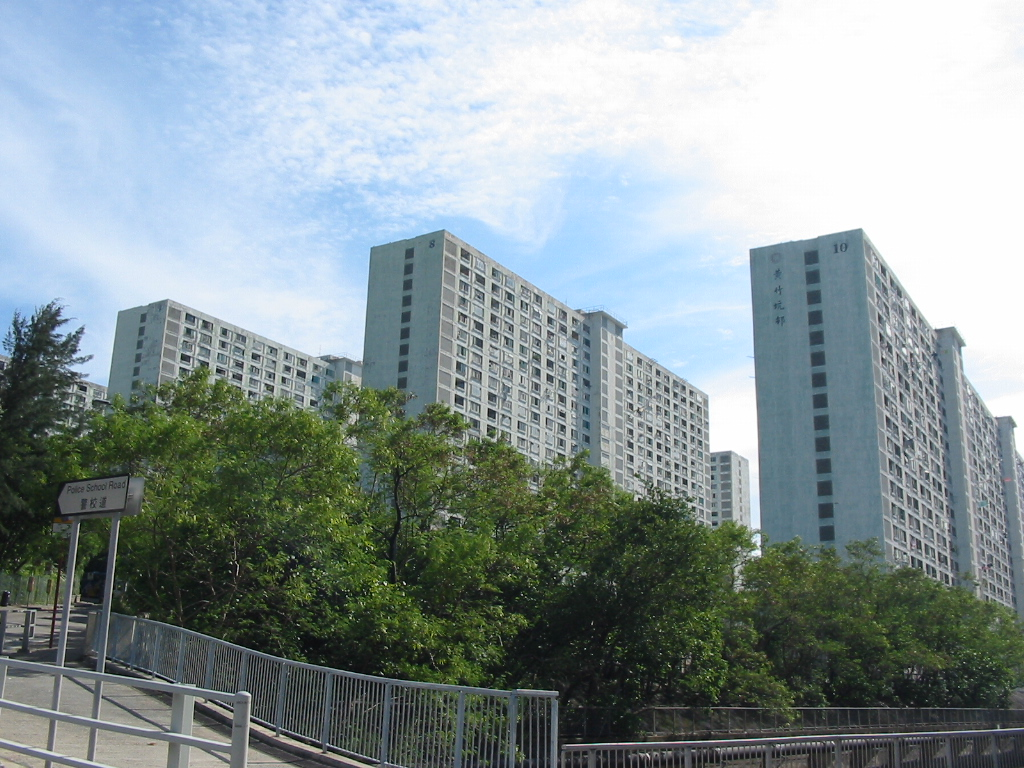
Wong Chuk Hang Estate

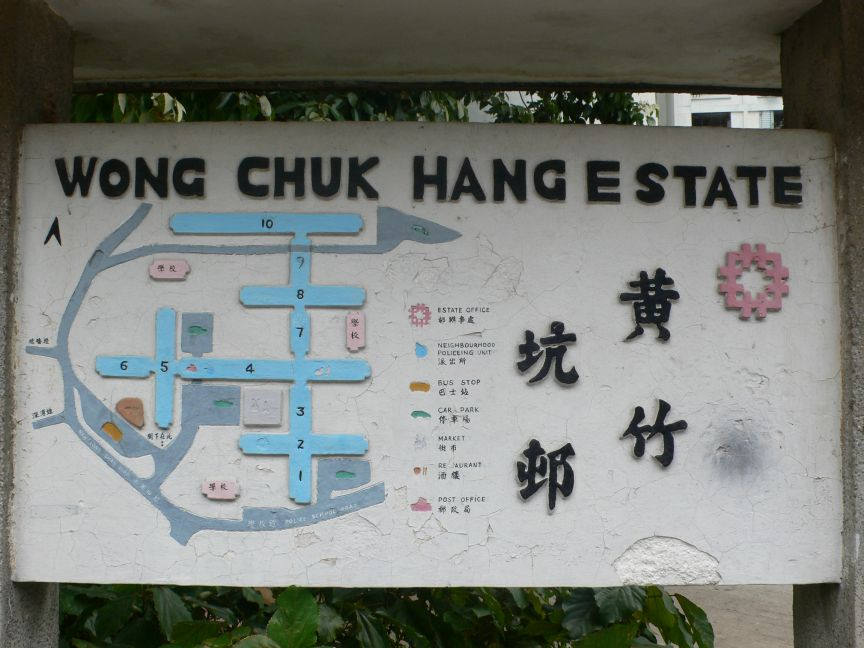
Map of Wong Chuk Hang Estate

Wong Chuk Hang Estate (Chinese: 黃竹坑邨) was a public housing estate in Staunton Creek, Hong Kong. The estate had ten residential blocks and was cleared in 2007. The estate has been replaced by the MTR Wong Chuk Hang station and Wong Chuk Hang Depot.

== Background ==
Wong Chuk Hang Estate was the only Government Low Cost Housing Estate on Hong Kong Island in the 1960s and the 1970s. It consisted of 10 residential blocks that were developed in 3 phases. Phase 1 (Block 1 and 2), Phase 2 (Block 3 to 6) and Phase 3 (Block 7 to 10) were completed in 1968, 1972 and 1973 respectively. In 1973, the estate was renamed Wong Chuk Hang Estate. In 1985, Block 9 was found to have structural problems by Hong Kong Housing Authority, and was demolished in 1988. In 2007, the whole estate was cleared and most of the tenants were moved to the nearby Shek Pai Wan Estate. The site has been replaced by the MTR Wong Chuk Hang station, one of the railway stations of the South Island line, and a railway depot.

== See also ==
- Wong Chuk Hang station
- Public housing in Hong Kong
- List of public housing estates in Hong Kong
