= Wong Chuk Hang (constituency) =

Constituency of the Southern District Council of Hong Kong

- Elected constituency for the Southern District Council
- Boundary of Wong Chuk Hang in Southern District
- District: Southern
- Legislative Council constituency: Hong Kong Island West
- Population: 17,715 (2019)
- Electorate: 9,344 (2019)

Current constituency
- Created: 1988
- Number of members: One
- Member: Vacant

Wong Chuk Hang is one of the 17 constituencies in the Southern District, Hong Kong.

The constituency returns one district councillor to the Southern District Council, with an election every four years. The seat was last held by Tsui Yuen-wa of the Democratic Party.

Wong Chuk Hang constituency is loosely based on Wong Chuk Hang and Aberdeen area including Broadview Court with estimated population of 16,589.

== Councillors represented ==
=== 1988 to 1991 ===
Election	Member	Party	Member	Party
1988	Ma Yuet-har	Civic Association	Ko Kam-cheung	Civic Association

=== 1991 to present ===
Election	Member	Party
1991	Ma Yuet-har	LDF
1994	Ma Yuet-har	Independent
1999	Joseph Chan Yuek-sut	Independent
2003	Ma Yuet-har	Independent
2007	Tsui Yuen-wa→Vacant (Note: Resigned on 9 July 2021.)	Democratic

== Election results ==
=== 2010s ===
Southern District Council Election, 2019: Wong Chuk Hang
Party	Candidate	Votes	%	±%
Democratic	Tsui Yuen-wa	3,983	57.93	+3.23
FTU (DAB)	Chan Wing-yan	2,893	42.07	−3.23
Majority		1,090	15.86	
Turnout		6,910	73.97	
Democratic hold		Swing		

Southern District Council Election, 2015: Wong Chuk Hang
Party	Candidate	Votes	%	±%
Democratic	Tsui Yuen-wa	2,645	54.7	–2.5
FTU	Chan Wing-yan	2,190	45.3	+2.8
Majority		455	9.4	–5.0
Turnout		4,887	54.5	
Democratic hold		Swing	–2.7	

Southern District Council Election, 2011: Wong Chuk Hang
Party	Candidate	Votes	%	±%
Democratic	Tsui Yuen-wa	2,344	57.2	+0.4
FTU (DAB)	Yuen Chi-kwong	1,752	42.8	+7.8
Majority		588	14.4	−7.4
Democratic hold		Swing		

=== 2000s ===
Southern District Council Election, 2007: Wong Chuk Hang
Party	Candidate	Votes	%	±%
Democratic	Tsui Yuen-wa	2,073	56.8	
DAB	Wong Choi-lap	1,277	35.0	
Liberal	Hui Wan-mai	301	8.2	
Majority		796	21.8	N/A
Democratic gain from Independent		Swing		

Southern District Council Election, 2003: Wong Chuk Hang
Party	Candidate	Votes	%	±%
Independent	Ma Yuet-har	uncontested		
Independent gain from Independent		Swing		

=== 1990s ===
Southern District Council Election, 1999: Wong Chuk Hang
Party	Candidate	Votes	%	±%
Independent	Joseph Chan Yuek-sut	unconstested		
Independent hold		Swing		

Southern District Board Election, 1994: Wong Chuk Hang
Party	Candidate	Votes	%	±%
Independent	Ma Yuet-har	uncontested		
Independent hold		Swing		

Southern District Board Election, 1991: Wong Chuk Hang
Party	Candidate	Votes	%	±%
LDF	Ma Yuet-har	uncontested		
LDF hold		Swing		

=== 1980s ===
Southern District Board Election, 1988: Wong Chuk Hang
Party	Candidate	Votes	%	±%
Civic	Ma Yuet-har	3,588	87.7	
Civic	Ko Kam-cheung	3,017	73.8	
Independent	Lee Sai-yick	529	12.9	
Independent	Yuen Hung-kwan	496	12.1	
Civic win (new seat)				
Civic win (new seat)				
