= Mount Cameron (Hong Kong) =

Hill in Hong Kong

- 金馬倫山
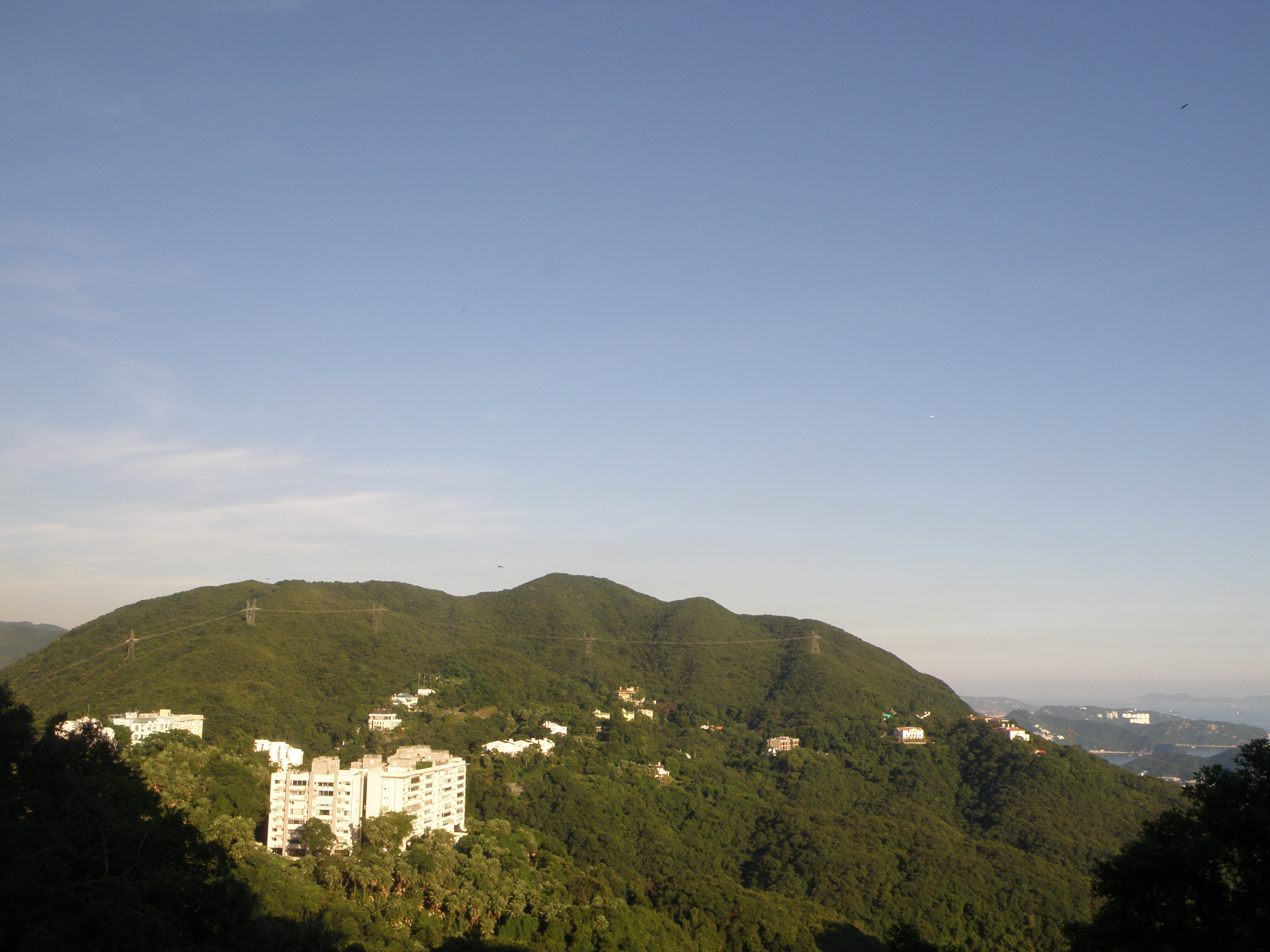
- View of Mount Cameron

Highest point
- Elevation: 439 m (1,440 ft)
- Coordinates: 22.262343°N 114.175162°E

Geography
- Location within Hong Kong
- Location: Hong Kong

Mount Cameron (Chinese: 金馬倫山) is a 439-metre (1,440 ft) high hill in Hong Kong. Located within the Aberdeen Country Park, it was likely named for Major General William Gordon Cameron, British Army officer and former Administrator of Hong Kong.

The trail to reach the peak of Mount Cameron is an extension of Hong Kong Trail Section 4.

Mount Cameron is located in Wan Chai District.

== Summit ==
Happy Valley and the city harbour skyline can be sighted at Mount Cameron's peak when facing North, while Wong Chuk Hang can be sighted when facing South. Lamma Island can also be spotted further from the sight of Wong Chuk Hang.

== History ==
A memorial for fallen Japanese soldiers was built during the occupation of Hong Kong on a nearby hill, northwest of Mount Cameron. It was later demolished in 1947. Its location is sometimes referred to as "Mount Cameron".

== See also ==
- List of mountains, peaks and hills in Hong Kong
- Victoria Peak
- Mount Gough
