= Staunton Creek Nullah =

Nullah in Hong Kong

Coordinates: 22°14′47″N 114°09′36″E

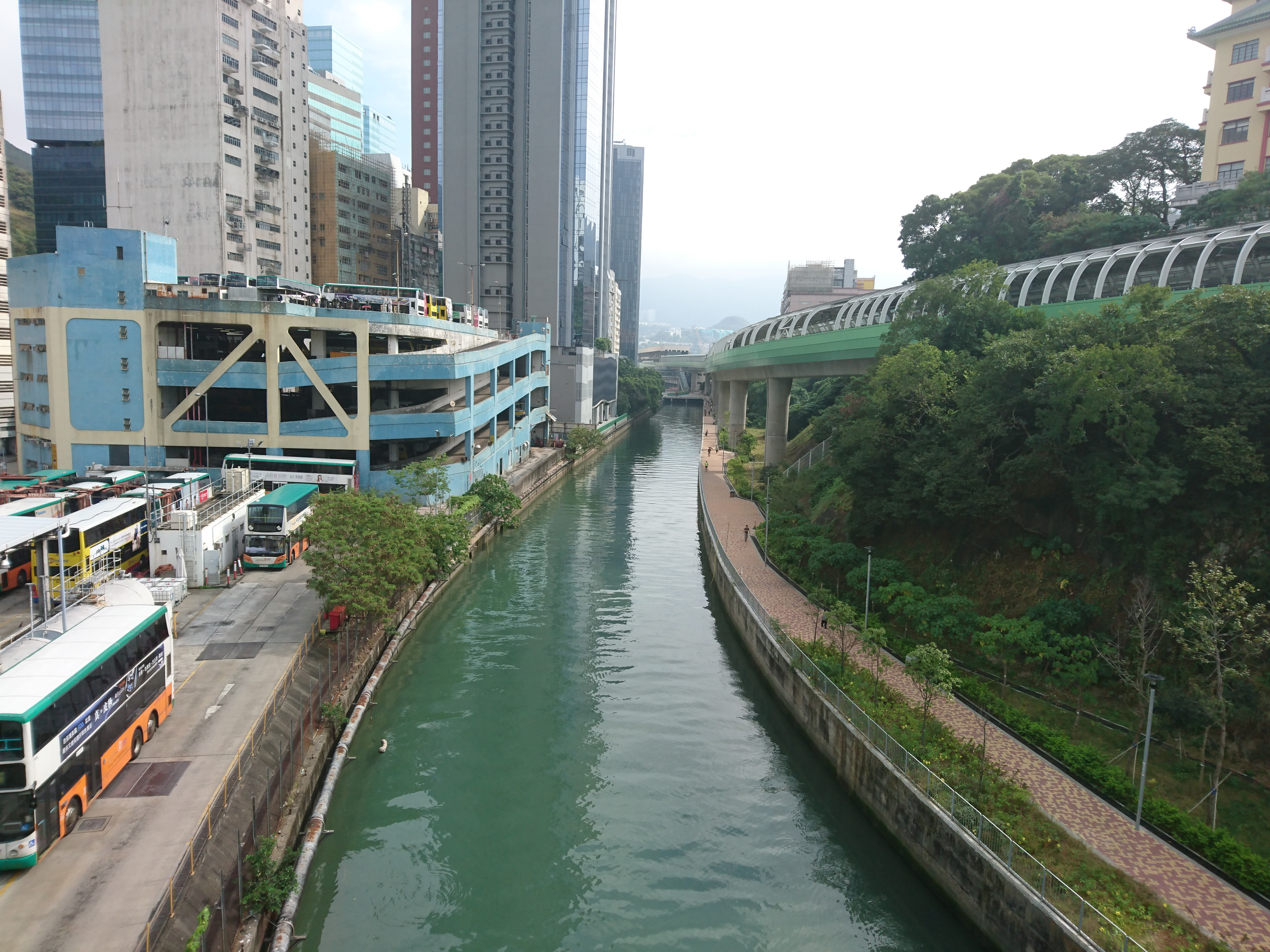
- The nullah near a bus depot
- Traditional Chinese: 黃竹坑明渠
- Cantonese Yale: wòhng jūk hāang mìhng kèuih
Transcriptions
Yue: Cantonese
- Yale Romanization: wòhng jūk hāang mìhng kèuih
- Jyutping: wong4 zuk1 haang1 ming4 keoi4

Staunton Creek Nullah (Chinese: 黃竹坑明渠) is a nullah in Hong Kong, located in Wong Chuk Hang, in the Southern District of Hong Kong Island. The stream is in the east of the valley near Mount Cameron starting from Aberdeen Sports Ground as an artificial open channel, flowing along Heung Yip Road at Aberdeen Typhoon Shelter (Aberdeen Channel).

== See also ==
- List of rivers and nullahs in Hong Kong
