= Wong Chuk Hang =

Neighbourhood in Southern District, Hong Kong

Coordinates: 22°14′53″N 114°10′00″E

Wong Chuk Hang 黃竹坑
- Suburb
- Wong Chuk Hang
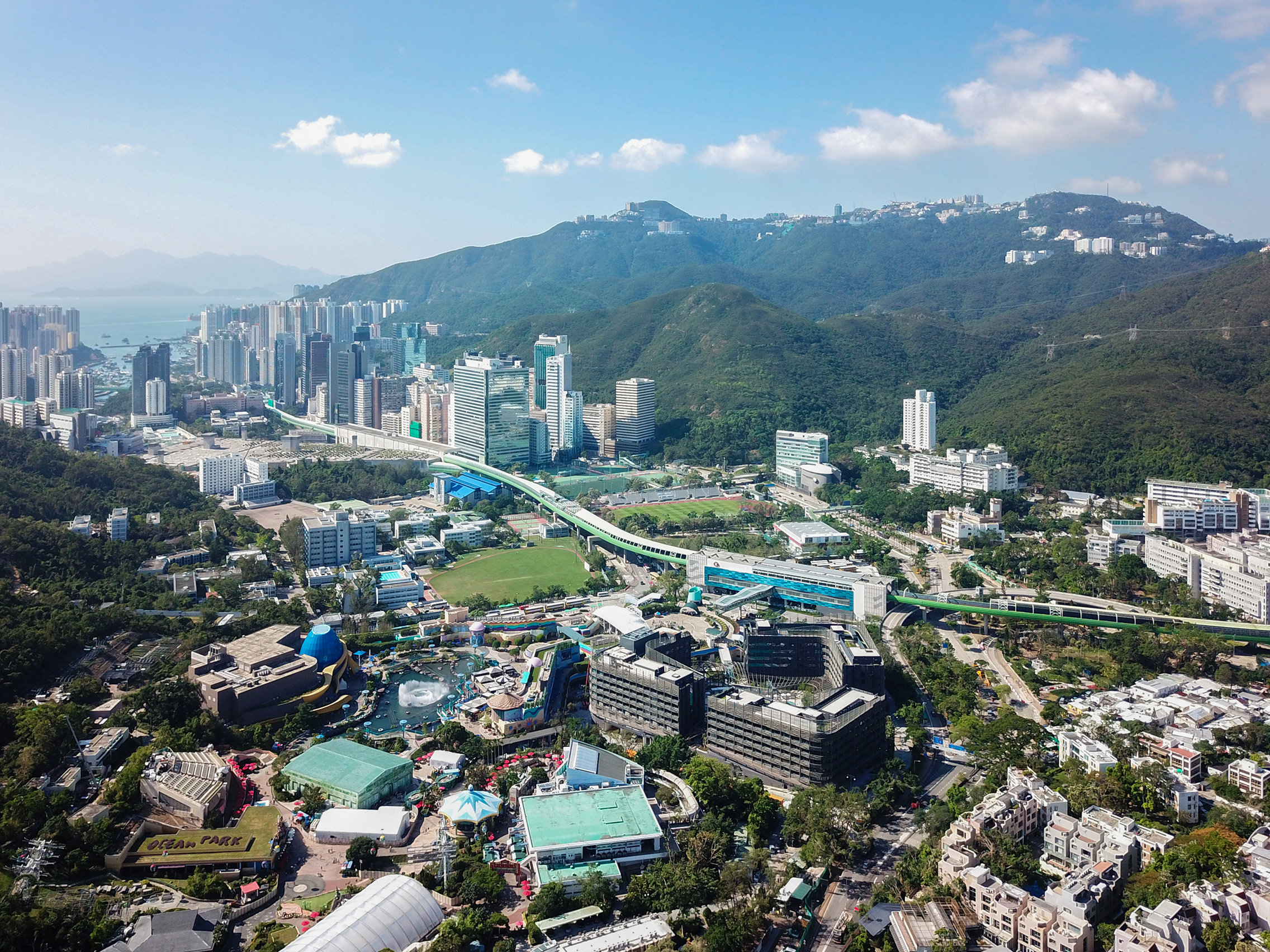
- A view of residential Wong Chuk Hang from the Ocean Park cable car system
- Interactive map of Wong Chuk Hang
- Country: Hong Kong
- District: Southern District
- Seat: Wong Chuk Hang

Government
  - Body: District Council
  - District Councillor: Tsui Yuen-wa (Democratic Party)

Wong Chuk Hang
- Traditional Chinese: 黃竹坑
- Simplified Chinese: 黄竹坑
- Cantonese Yale: Wòhngjūkhāang
- Literal meaning: "Yellow Bamboo Pit"
Transcriptions
Standard Mandarin
- Hanyu Pinyin: Huángzhúkēng
- Gwoyeu Romatzyh: Hwangjwukeng
- IPA: [xwǎŋ.ʈʂǔ.kʰə́ŋ]
Yue: Cantonese
- Yale Romanization: Wòhngjūkhāang
- Jyutping: Wong4zuk1haang1
- IPA: [wɔ̏ːŋ.tsók̚.háːŋ]

Wong Chuk Hang (Chinese: 黃竹坑; Jyutping: wong4 zuk1 haang1, Cantonese pronunciation: [wɔ̏ːŋ tsók̚ háːŋ]) is a neighbourhood in the Southern District of Hong Kong Island, in Hong Kong.

== History ==
Neolithic artifacts have been unearthed in a region called Chung Hom Wan, which is not far from Wong Chuk Hang. In 1550 the Hong Kong Village (香港村) was established in Wong Chuk Hang; it still exists, much diminished in size, as Wong Chuk Hang Kau Wai. A satellite village, Wong Chuk Hang San Wai, was established in the 1860s and 1870s. The name Staunton (along with valley and creek) is likely linked to Sir George Staunton, 2nd Baronet.

== Features ==
Features of Wong Chuk Hang include:

- Grantham Hospital
- Holy Spirit Seminary
- Hong Kong Police Training School
- Ocean Park
- Wong Chuk Hang Estate

== Economy ==
The head office of the clothing Lane Crawford is in One Island South, Wong Chuk Hang.

== Climate ==
Climate data for Wong Chuk Hang (1990–2016)
Month	Jan	Feb	Mar	Apr	May	Jun	Jul	Aug	Sep	Oct	Nov	Dec	Year
Record high °C (°F)	28.0 (82.4)	28.5 (83.3)	30.3 (86.5)	30.9 (87.6)	32.5 (90.5)	35.3 (95.5)	36.2 (97.2)	36.0 (96.8)	36.0 (96.8)	33.4 (92.1)	31.7 (89.1)	29.4 (84.9)	36.2 (97.2)
Mean daily maximum °C (°F)	19.5 (67.1)	20.2 (68.4)	22.3 (72.1)	25.3 (77.5)	28.3 (82.9)	29.8 (85.6)	30.7 (87.3)	30.8 (87.4)	30.3 (86.5)	28.2 (82.8)	25.2 (77.4)	21.4 (70.5)	26.0 (78.8)
Daily mean °C (°F)	16.4 (61.5)	17.3 (63.1)	19.6 (67.3)	22.9 (73.2)	25.9 (78.6)	27.7 (81.9)	28.3 (82.9)	28.2 (82.8)	27.5 (81.5)	25.3 (77.5)	22.0 (71.6)	18.1 (64.6)	23.3 (73.9)
Mean daily minimum °C (°F)	13.8 (56.8)	14.9 (58.8)	17.3 (63.1)	20.8 (69.4)	23.9 (75.0)	25.9 (78.6)	26.2 (79.2)	26.0 (78.8)	25.3 (77.5)	23.0 (73.4)	19.5 (67.1)	15.4 (59.7)	21.0 (69.8)
Record low °C (°F)	3.4 (38.1)	7.0 (44.6)	9.0 (48.2)	10.9 (51.6)	16.1 (61.0)	20.8 (69.4)	22.6 (72.7)	22.5 (72.5)	18.7 (65.7)	16.3 (61.3)	9.6 (49.3)	4.7 (40.5)	3.4 (38.1)
Average precipitation mm (inches)	33.7 (1.33)	25.5 (1.00)	75.8 (2.98)	162.9 (6.41)	300.5 (11.83)	472.9 (18.62)	359.3 (14.15)	396.3 (15.60)	327.9 (12.91)	85.9 (3.38)	41.4 (1.63)	29.6 (1.17)	2,311.7 (91.01)
Average rainy days (≥ 0.5 mm)	3.8	5.5	7.1	9.7	13.2	18.0	16.4	14.5	12.7	6.8	4.4	4.8	116.9
Average relative humidity (%)	71	76	79	83	84	85	83	83	78	71	70	67	77
Source: Hong Kong Observatory

== Transport ==
Road

Aberdeen Tunnel is a two-tube tunnel linking Wong Chuk Hang and Happy Valley.

Rail

Ocean Park station and Wong Chuk Hang station, stations of the MTR South Island line.

== Education ==
Wong Chuk Hang is in Primary One Admission (POA) School Net 18. Within the school net are multiple aided schools (operated independently but funded with government money) and Hong Kong Southern District Government Primary School.

== See also ==
- Wong Chuk Hang (constituency)
- Prehistoric Hong Kong
