= Holy Spirit Seminary =

Coordinates: 22.246459°N 114.161746°E

- Chinese: 聖神修院
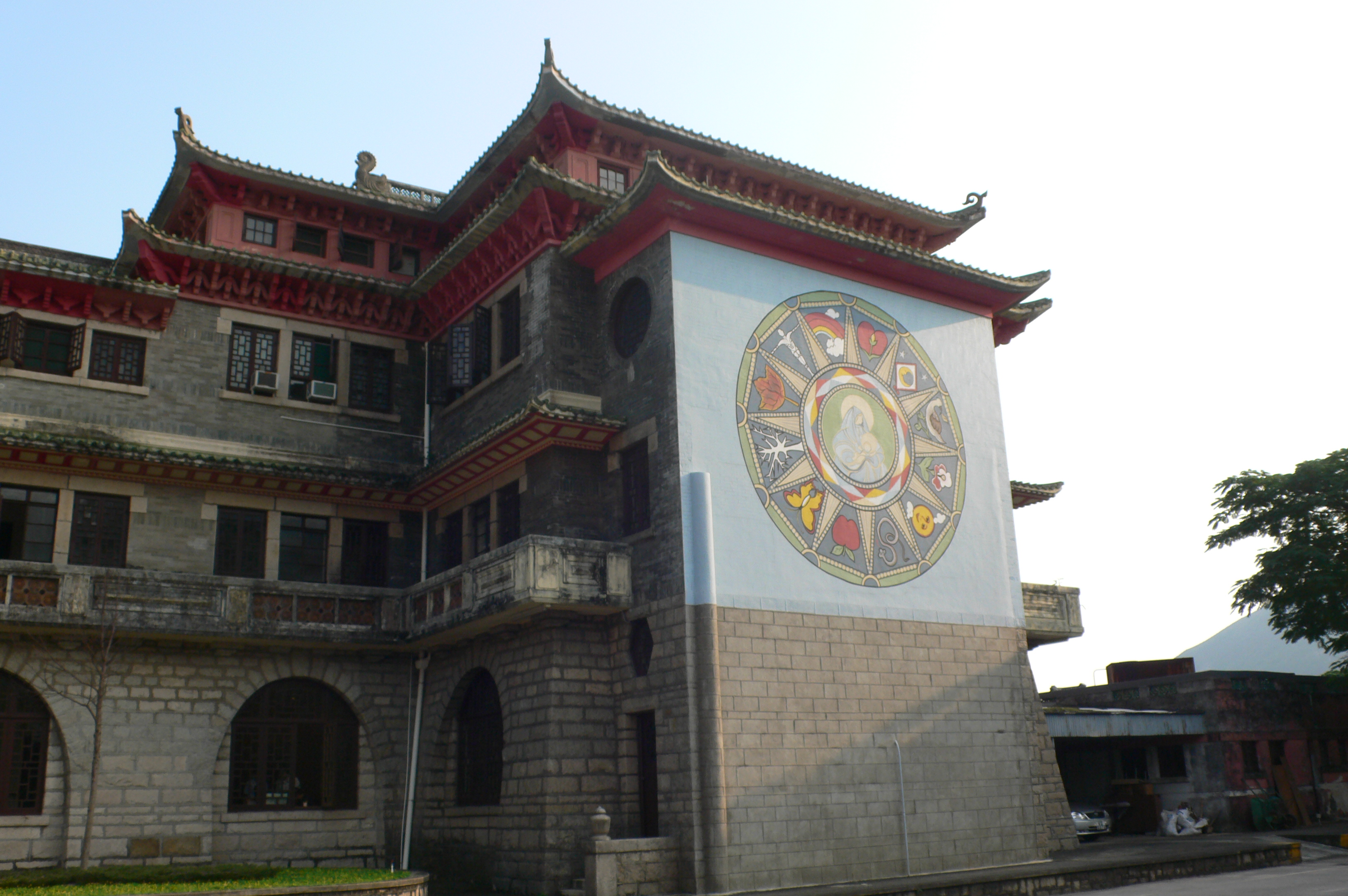
- Holy Spirit Seminary
- Location: 6 Welfare Road, Aberdeen, Hong Kong
- Country: Hong Kong, China
- Denomination: Catholic
- Website: http://www.hss.org.hk

History
- Former name: Regional Seminary for South China
- Status: Diocesan Seminary
- Founded: 3 October 1930; 95 years ago
- Consecrated: 1 November 1931; 94 years ago

Architecture
- Heritage designation: South Block (Grade 1); Chapel (Grade 3)
- Architect(s): Dom. Adalbert Gresnigt, OSB
- Style: Chinese

Administration
- Diocese: Hong Kong

Clergy
- Rector: Bishop Joseph Ha, OFM (Auxiliary Bishop of Hong Kong)

Holy Spirit Seminary
- Traditional Chinese: 聖神修院
- Simplified Chinese: 圣神修院
Transcriptions
Standard Mandarin
- Hanyu Pinyin: Shèngshén Xiūyuàn
Yue: Cantonese
- Jyutping: sing3 san4 sau1 jyun6*2

The Holy Spirit Seminary (Chinese: 聖神修院) is the seminary which is affiliated with the Roman Catholic Diocese of Hong Kong. Since its foundation in 1931 as the "Regional Seminary for South China" (Chinese: 華南總修院), it has provided theological and pastoral formation to young men who aspire to serve the Church as diocesan priests.

Its Seminary College also provides courses in theology and philosophy for lay students.

== History ==
The seminary descends from the "Regional Seminary for South China", which was transferred to the Diocese of Hong Kong in 1964 as China no longer sent seminarians at that point. The Jesuits, Salesians and Franciscans have been involved in it.

On Saturday, 22 September 2012, Pope Benedict XVI named Professor Anna Kai-Yung Chan, a Professor at Holy Spirit Seminary's College of Theology and Philosophy, as one of the papally-appointed Experts to serve at the upcoming October 2012 13th Ordinary General Assembly of the Synod of Bishops on the New Evangelization.
