= Lei Tung station =

MTR station on Ap Lei Chau, Hong Kong

Lei Tung 利東
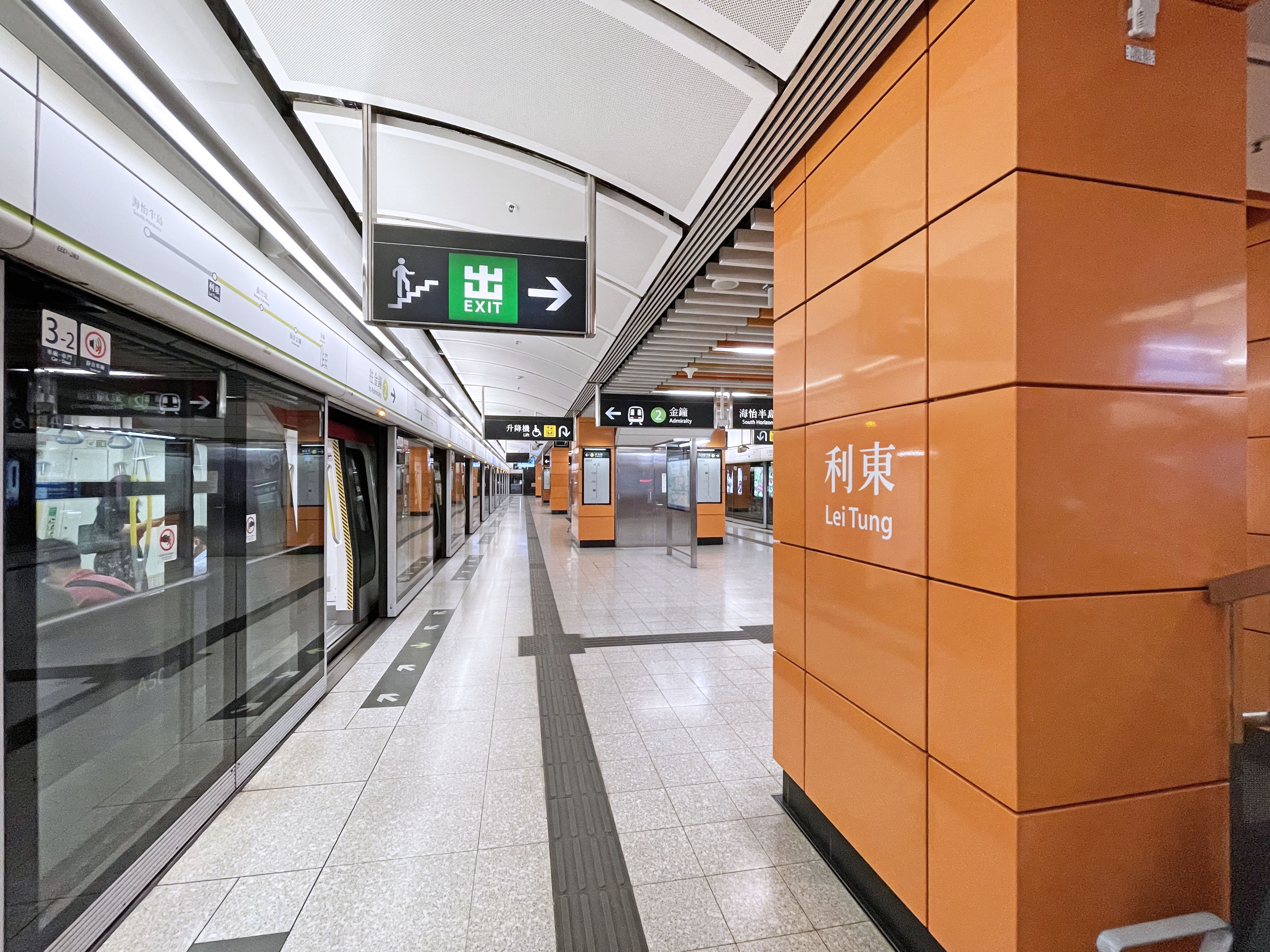
- Platform 2 to Admiralty

Chinese name
- Traditional Chinese: 利東
- Cantonese Yale: Leihdūng
Transcriptions
Standard Mandarin
- Hanyu Pinyin: Lìdōng
Yue: Cantonese
- Yale Romanization: Leihdūng
- Jyutping: Lei6dung1

General information
- Location: Lei Tung Estate Road, Ap Lei Chau; Southern District, Hong Kong
- Coordinates: 22°14′32″N 114°09′22″E
- System: MTR rapid transit station
- Owner: MTR Corporation
- Operator: MTR Corporation
- Line: South Island line
- Platforms: 2 (1 island platform)
- Tracks: 2

Construction
- Structure type: Underground
- Platform levels: 1
- Accessible: Yes

Other information
- Station code: LET

History
- Opened: 28 December 2016; 9 years ago

Services
Preceding station	MTR	Following station
Wong Chuk Hang towards Admiralty	South Island line	South Horizons Terminus
Track layout
Location
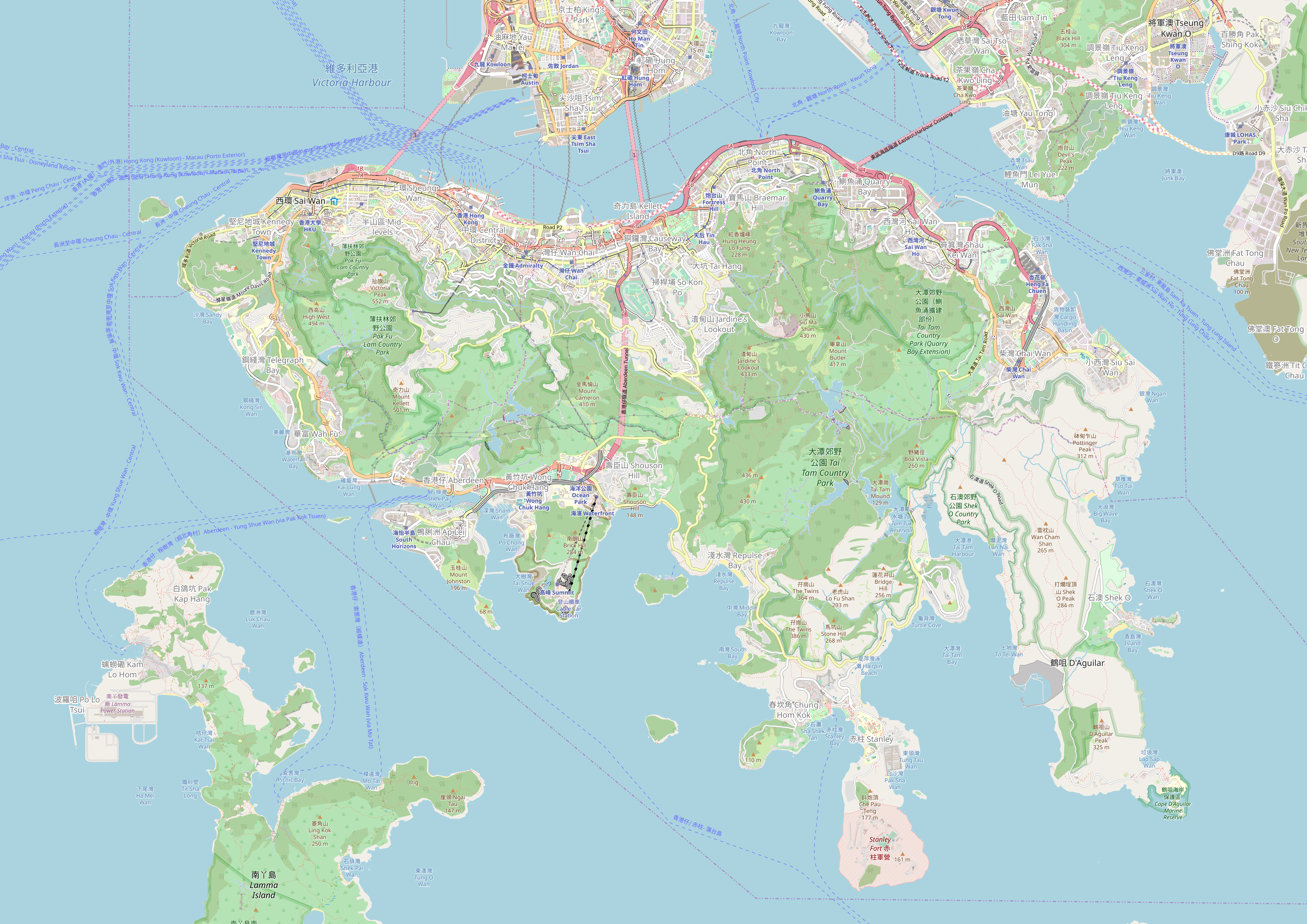
- Location within MTR Location within Hong Kong Island

Lei Tung (Chinese: 利東; Cantonese Yale: Leihdūng) is an underground MTR rapid transit station in Hong Kong on the eastern section of the South Island line, located beside Mount Johnston on Ap Lei Chau in Southern District. Its livery is orange.

The station is named after the adjacent public housing estate of the same name, which it serves in addition to Ap Lei Chau Main Street. The station is located below Yue On Court and Lei Tung Estate. It is the southernmost railway station in Hong Kong, with this record previously held by Chai Wan.

== History ==
The station was built by the Leighton Contractors–John Holland Joint Venture under Contract 904, awarded May 2011, which also included South Horizons station and sections of running tunnel. It was constructed using the drill-and-blast method.

Lei Tung station was opened on 28 December 2016, with the rest of the South Island line.

== Station Artwork ==
Artworks in the station are Dawn of a New Day and Journeys Along the South Island Line (East) by local children under the respective leadership of Castally Leung Ching-man and Sum Sum Tse. The art is located in the passageway to exit A, as well as the concourse and lift cars of exit B.

== Station layout ==
G	Street level	Exits
L7	Concourse	Customer service, MTRShops, Vending machines, ATMs
L7	Concourse	Octopus Add Value Machine
L8; Platforms	Platform 2	South Island line towards Admiralty (Wong Chuk Hang) →
L8; Platforms	Island platform, doors will open on the right
L8; Platforms	Platform 1	← South Island line towards South Horizons (Terminus)

The station is underground with two tracks and an island platform. North of the station, the line rises onto Aberdeen Channel Bridge, a railway bridge designed by Atkins Global that spans the Aberdeen Channel.

=== Entrances/exits ===
Lei Tung station has three exits. The exit to Lei Tung Estate Bus Terminal is connected to the concourse by lifts instead of escalators, due to the 40 m (130 ft) depth of the platforms. Passage from exit A to exit B does not require entering the paid area.

- A1: Ap Lei Chau Main Street (ground level)
- A2: Ap Lei Chau Bridge Road (accessed by lift)
- B: Lei Tung Estate, Lei Tung Commercial Centre, taxi stand, bus terminal (all entry/exit by 4 lifts)
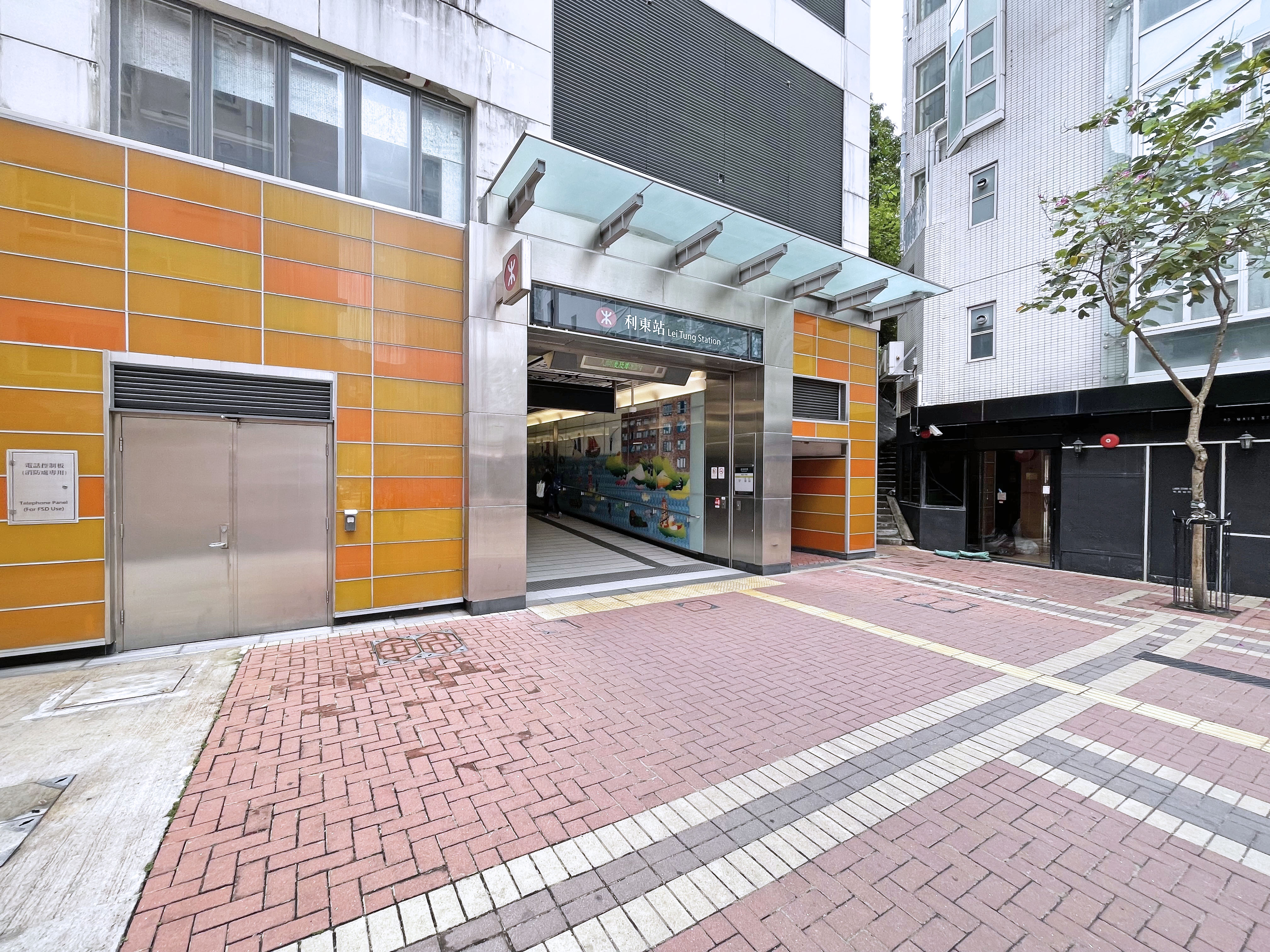
Exit A1

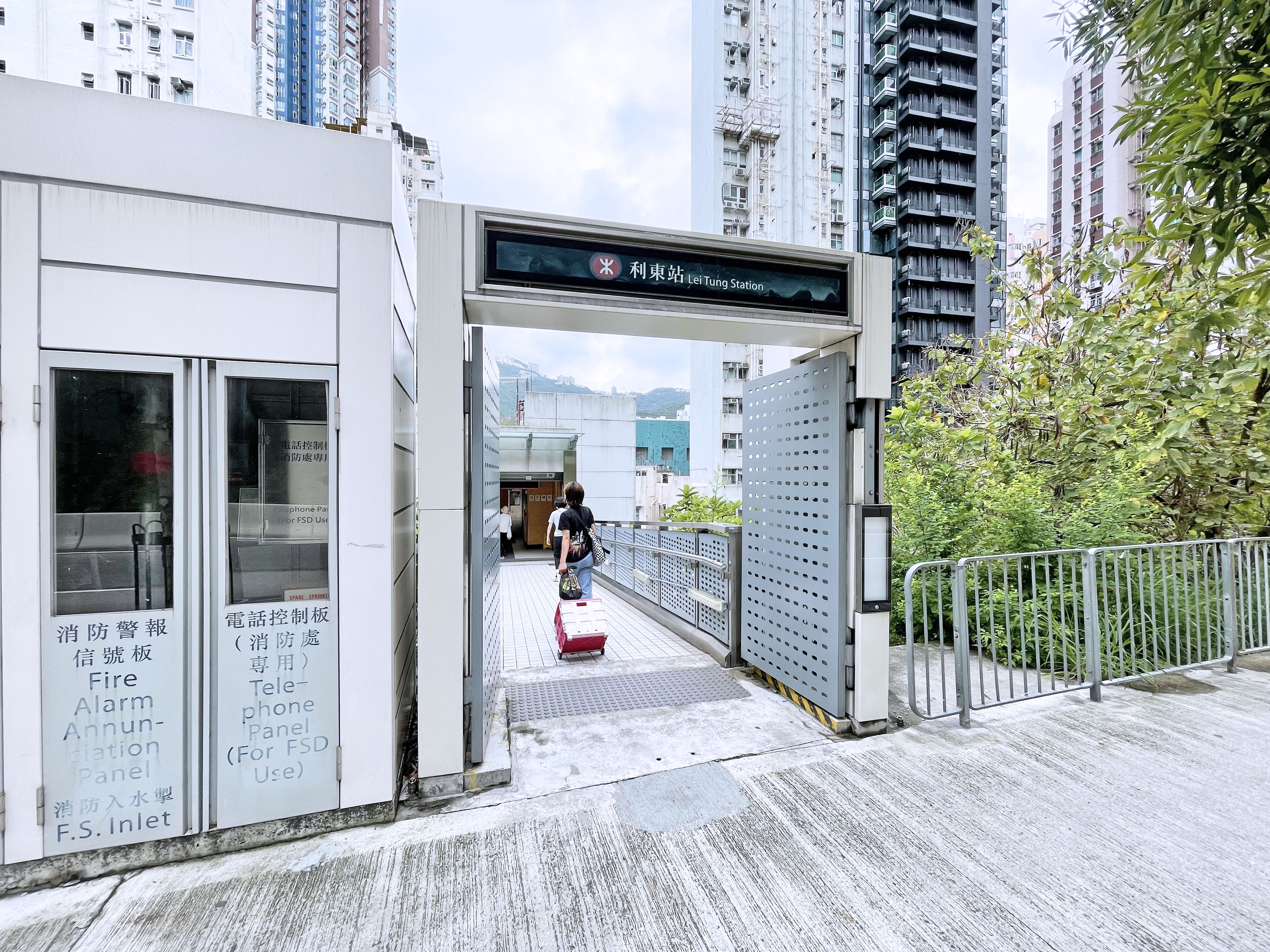
Exit A2

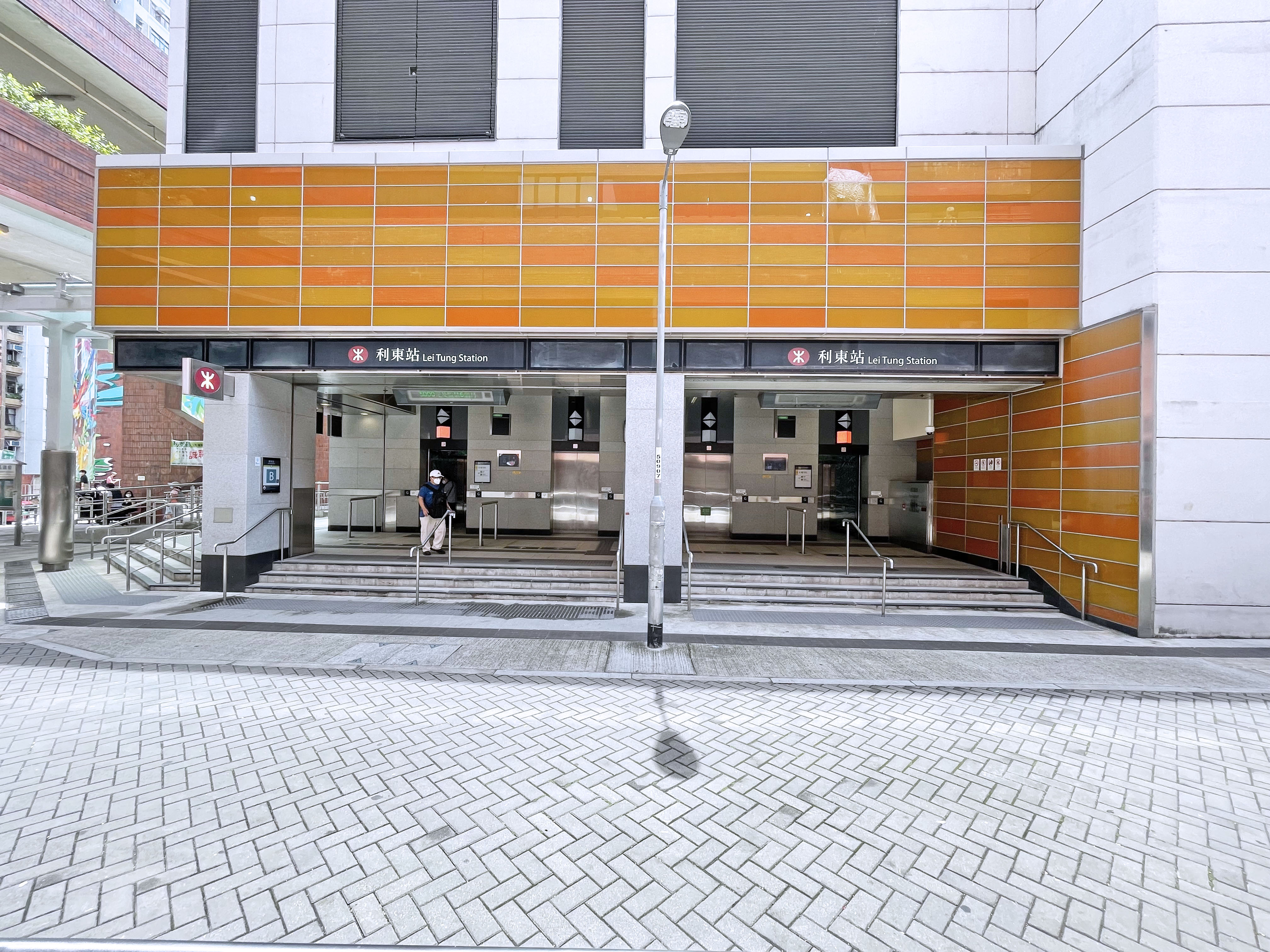
Exit B
