= South Horizons station =

MTR station on Ap Lei Chau, Hong Kong

South Horizons 海怡半島
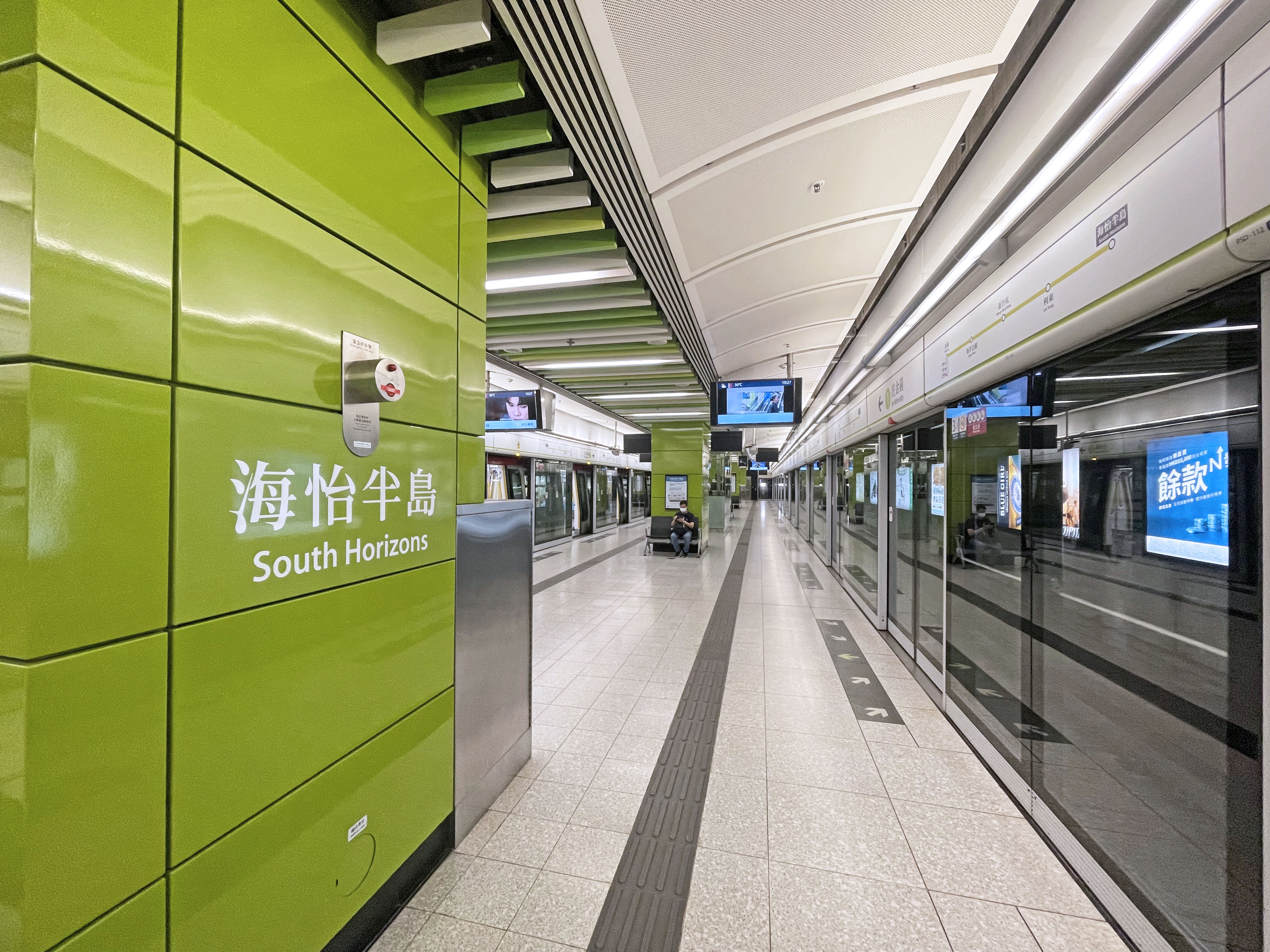
- Platforms of South Horizons Station

Chinese name
- Traditional Chinese: 海怡半島
- Cantonese Yale: Hóiyì Bundóu
Transcriptions
Standard Mandarin
- Hanyu Pinyin: Hǎiyí Bàndǎo
Yue: Cantonese
- Yale Romanization: Hóiyì Bundóu
- Jyutping: Hoi2ji4 Bun3dou2

General information
- Location: Ap Lei Chau; Southern District, Hong Kong
- Coordinates: 22°14′33″N 114°08′57″E
- System: MTR rapid transit station
- Owner: MTR Corporation
- Operator: MTR Corporation
- Line: South Island line
- Platforms: 2 (1 island platform)
- Tracks: 2

Construction
- Structure type: Underground
- Accessible: Yes

Other information
- Station code: SOH

History
- Opened: 28 December 2016; 9 years ago

Services
| Preceding station | MTR | Following station |
|---|---|---|
| Lei Tung towards Admiralty | South Island line | Terminus |
Track layout
Location
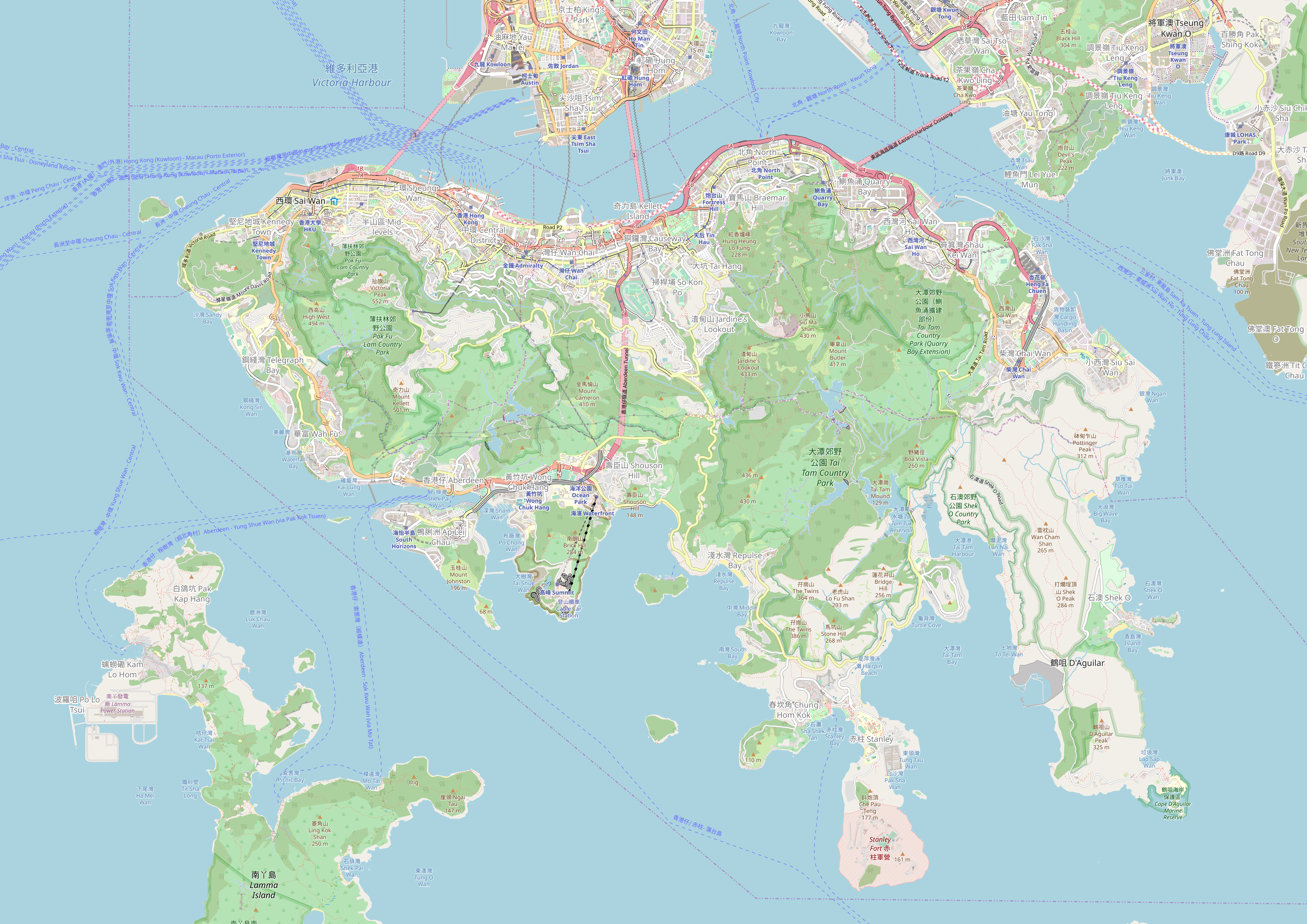
- Location within MTR Location within Hong Kong Island

South Horizons (Chinese: 海怡半島; Cantonese Yale: Hóiyì Bundóu) is an underground MTR rapid transit station in Hong Kong, located on Ap Lei Chau in Southern District. It is the southern terminus of the South Island line. It opened on 28 December 2016 with the rest of the South Island line.

The station is located under the junction of Yi Nam Road and South Horizon Drive, and primarily serves residents of the South Horizons private housing estate, in addition to Ap Lei Chau Estate and Ap Lei Chau West Industrial Area. The station has a unique shape in the form of a letter Y, and has no overrun track.

== History ==
The station was built by the Leighton Asia – John Holland Joint Venture under Contract 904, awarded May 2011, which also included Lei Tung station and sections of running tunnel. It was constructed using the cut-and-cover method.

== Station Artwork ==
There are two artworks in the station. Along the glass walls of exits A and B, the work Tree Shadow in the Gridline, by Cheung Wai-lok, features shadows of trees in order to transition the exit passageways between indoors and outdoors.

On the platform level, the mosaic Soaring Horizon, created by children overseen by Karen Pow Cheuk-mei, features the surrounding landscape on the horizon, including the sea.

== Station layout ==
| G | Street level | Exits |
| L1 | Concourse | Customer service, MTRShops, Vending machines, ATMs |
| L1 | Concourse | Octopus Add Value Machine |
| L2; Platforms | Platform 2 | South Island line towards Admiralty (Lei Tung) → |
| L2; Platforms | Island platform, doors will open on the left/right |
| L2; Platforms | Platform 1 | South Island line towards Admiralty (Lei Tung) → |

This underground station has two tracks and an island platform. The station's single concourse is located at the west of the station (near the bumper blocks), with all three exits extending from this concourse.

=== Entrances/exits ===
South Horizons station has three exits serving the residential buildings of South Horizons. There are two lifts for exit C.

- A: Ap Lei Chau Estate (using an 80 m-long (260 ft) footbridge) / South Horizons Phase 1 & 4, Marina Square East Centre
- B: South Horizons Phase 2 & 3, South Horizon Drive, Marina Square West Wing
- C: South Horizons Phase 3 & 4, Yi Nam Road, public transport interchange
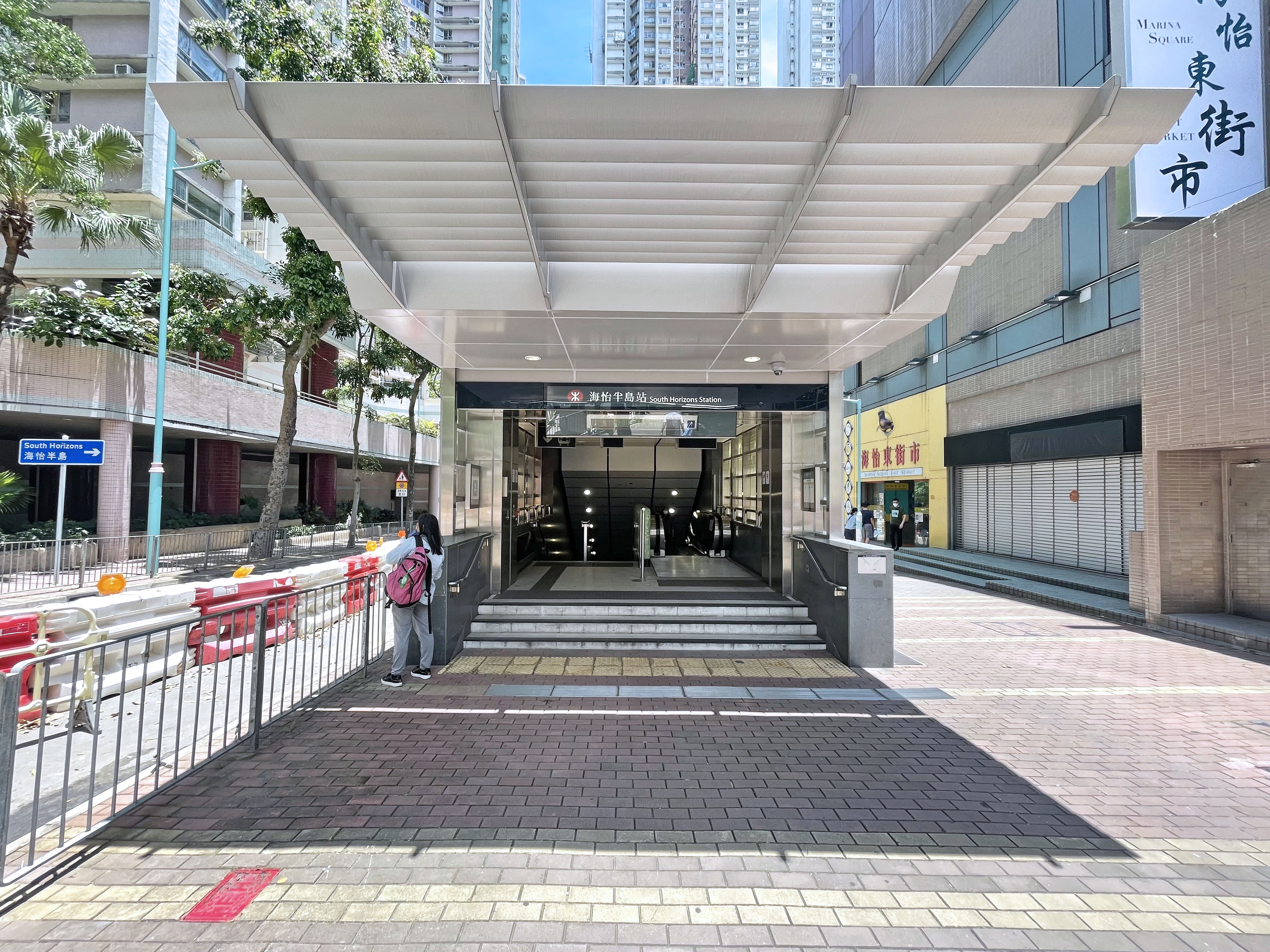
Exit A

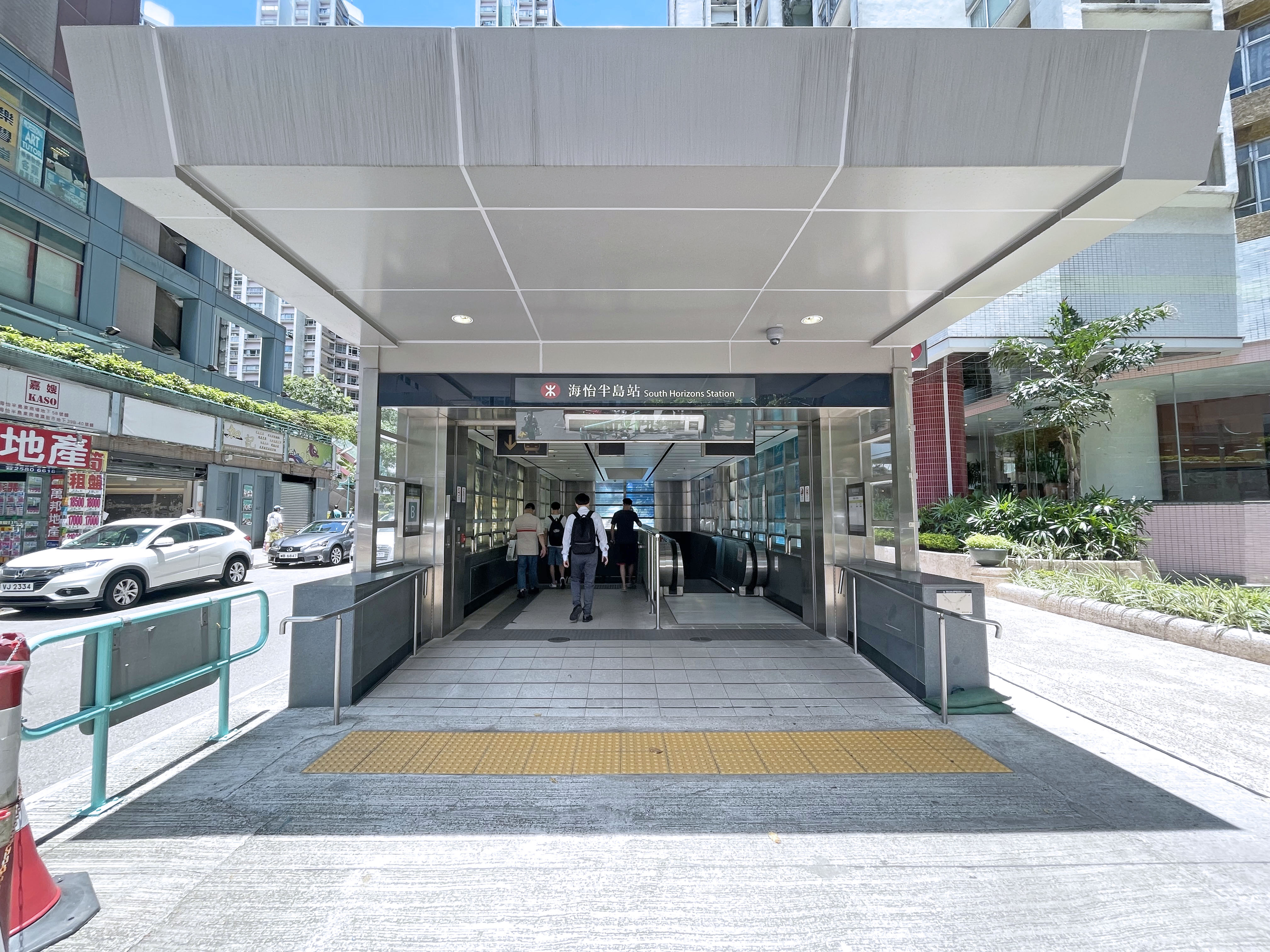
Exit B

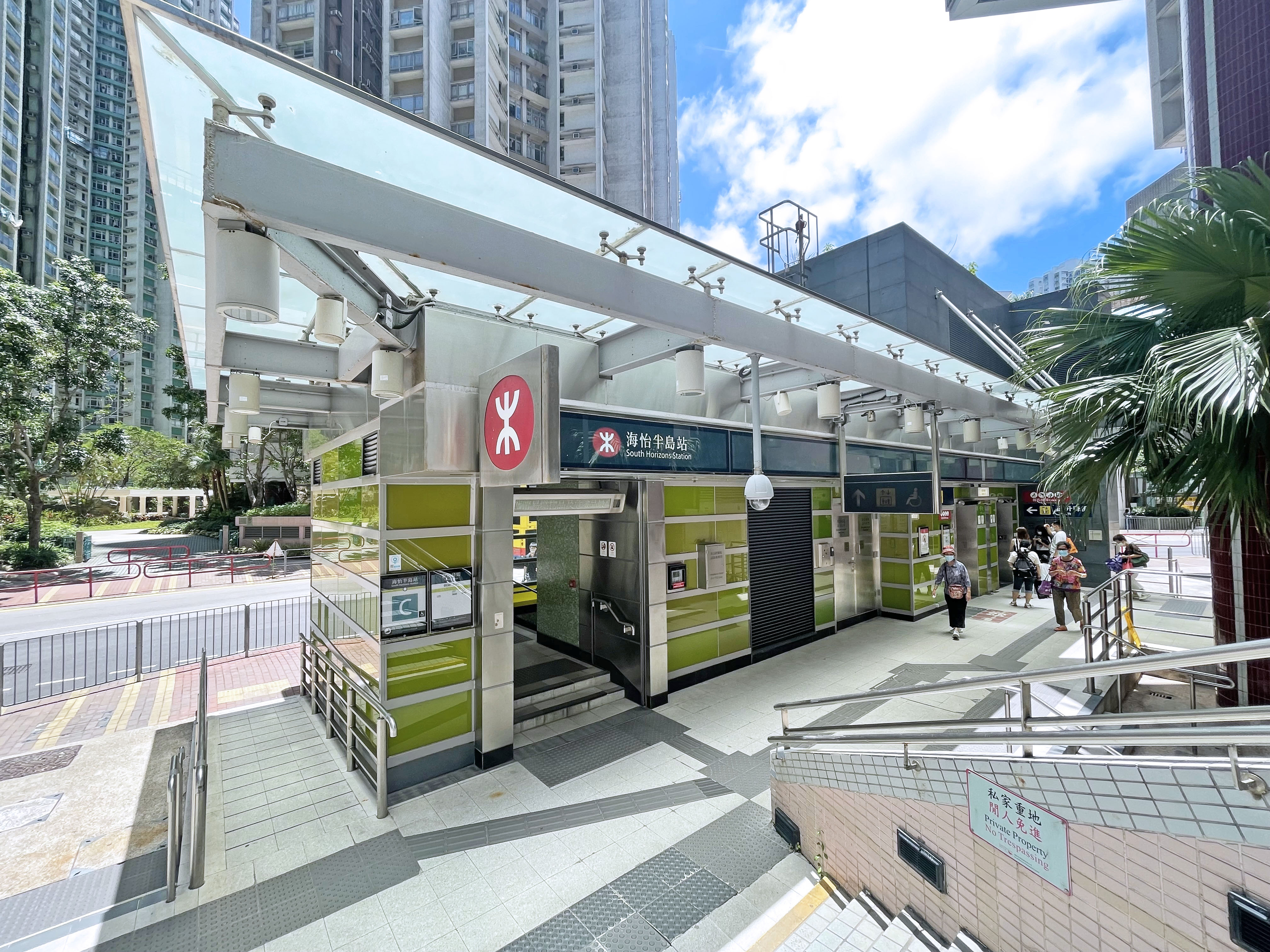
Exit C
