= South Horizons East (constituency) =

- Elected constituency for the Southern District Council
- Boundary of South Horizons East in Southern District
- District: Southern
- Legislative Council constituency: Hong Kong Island West
- Population: 14,642 (2019)
- Electorate: 8,461 (2019)

Current constituency
- Created: 1999
- Number of members: One
- Member: Vacant

South Horizons East is one of the 17 constituencies in the Southern District, Hong Kong.

The constituency returns one district councillor to the Southern District Council, with an election every four years. Since its creation in the 1999 election, the seat was last held by Civic Party James Yu Chun-hei.

South Horizons East constituency is loosely based on the eastern part of the South Horizons in Ap Lei Chau with estimated population of 15,319.

== Councillors represented ==
Election	Member	Party
1999	Lam Kai-fai	Independent
2019	James Yu Chun-hei→Vacant (Note: Resigned on 9 July 2021.)	Civic

== Election results ==
=== 2010s ===
Southern District Council Election, 2019: South Horizons East
Party	Candidate	Votes	%	±%
Civic	James Yu Chun-hei	3,750	55.89	+16.39
Independent	Lam Kai-fai	2,960	44.11	−2.59
Majority		790	11.78	
Turnout		6,744	79.71	
Civic gain from Independent		Swing		

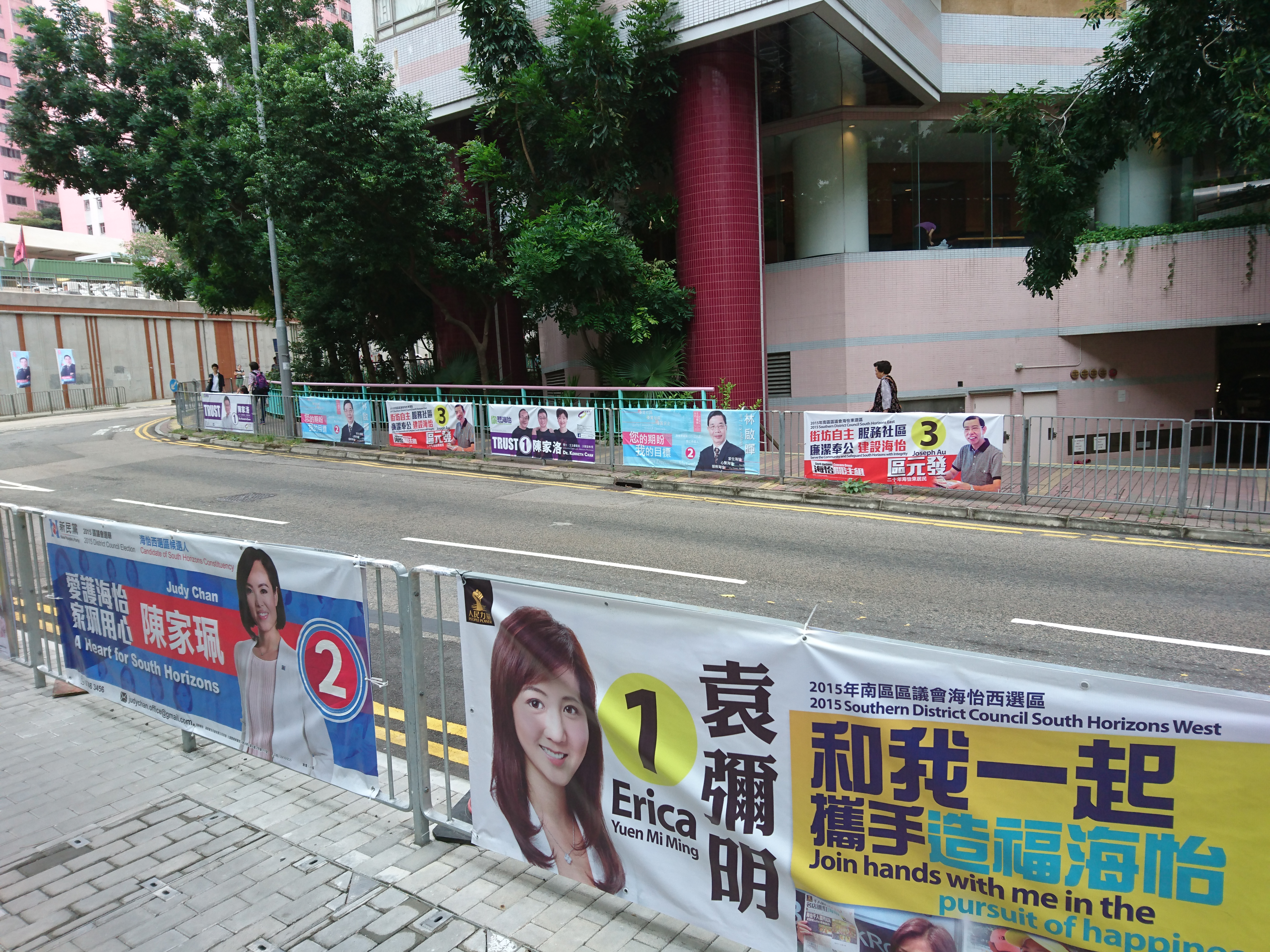
Election banners in the 2015 election.

Southern District Council Election, 2015: South Horizons East
Party	Candidate	Votes	%	±%
Independent	Lam Kai-fai	2,180	46.7	–19.5
Civic	Kenneth Chan Ka-lok	1,845	39.5	+5.7
Nonpartisan	Joseph Au Yuen-fat	643	13.8	
Majority		335	7.2	
Turnout		4,701	62.7	
Independent hold		Swing	–12.6	

Southern District Council Election, 2011: South Horizons East
Party	Candidate	Votes	%	±%
Independent	Lam Kai-fai	2,275	66.2	+9.7
Civic	Kwok Wing-hang	1,161	33.8	−6.8
Independent hold		Swing		

=== 2000s ===
Southern District Council Election, 2007: South Horizons East
Party	Candidate	Votes	%	±%
Independent	Lam Kai-fai	1,687	56.5	−2.3
Civic	William Ngai Wai-wang	1,129	40.6	
Independent hold		Swing		

Southern District Council Election, 2003: South Horizons East
Party	Candidate	Votes	%	±%
Independent	Lam Kai-fai	1,613	58.8	
Democratic	Fung Wai-kwong	1,128	41.2	
Independent hold		Swing		

=== 1990s ===
Southern District Council Election, 1999: South Horizons East
Party	Candidate	Votes	%	±%
Independent	Lam Kai-fai	950	55.5	
Democratic	Cora Chea Yuen-yue	745	43.5	
Independent win (new seat)				
