= South Horizons =

Housing estate in Ap Lei Chau, Hong Kong

Coordinates: 22.243364°N 114.147563°E

- Traditional Chinese: 海怡半島
- Simplified Chinese: 海怡半岛
- Literal meaning: Ocean Harmony Peninsula
Transcriptions
Standard Mandarin
- Hanyu Pinyin: Hǎi Yí Bàndǎo
Yue: Cantonese
- Jyutping: hoi2 ji4 bun3 dou2

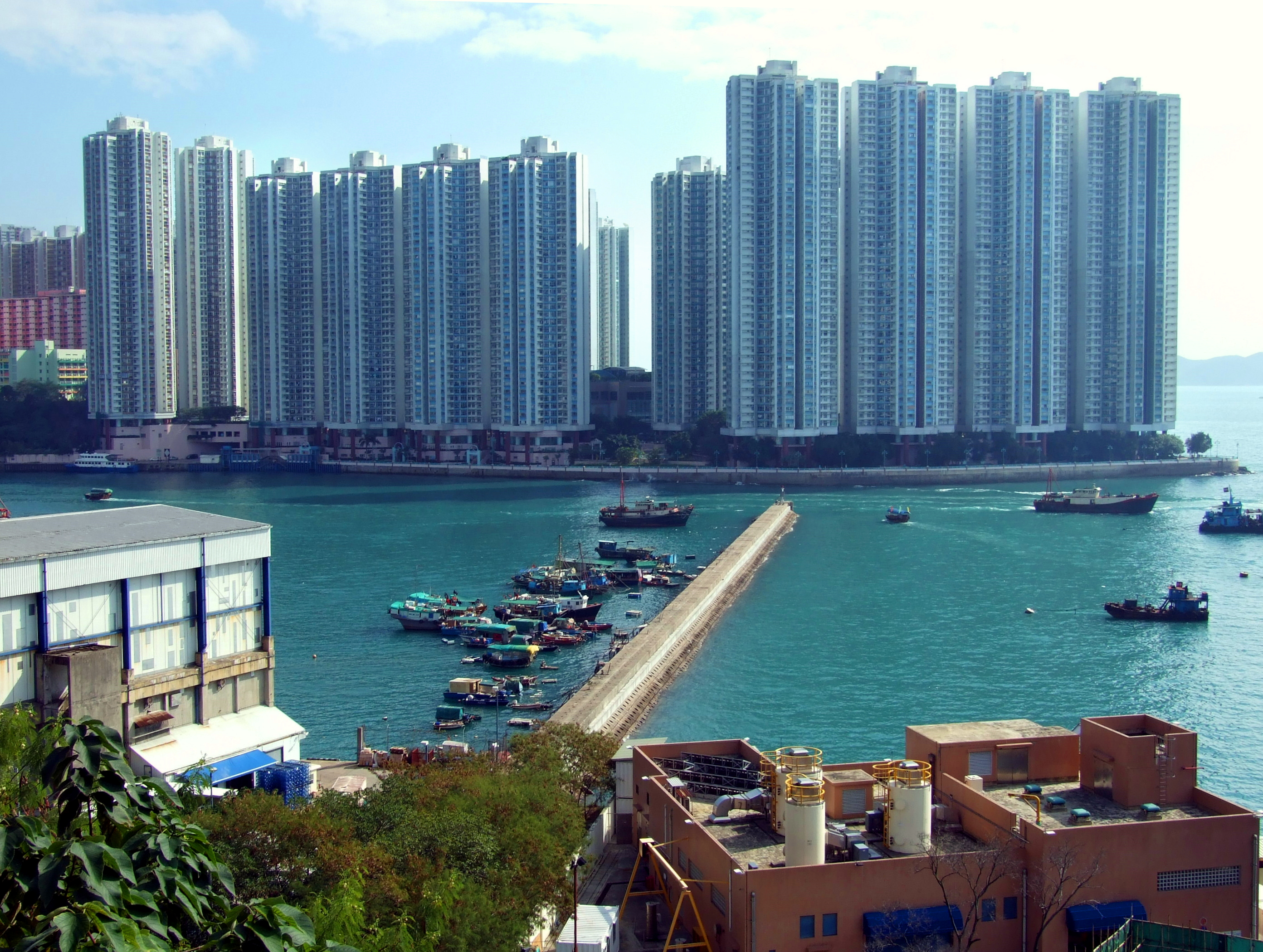
South Horizons Phases I and II at the western end of Ap Lei Chau, viewed from the north, across Aberdeen West Typhoon Shelter.

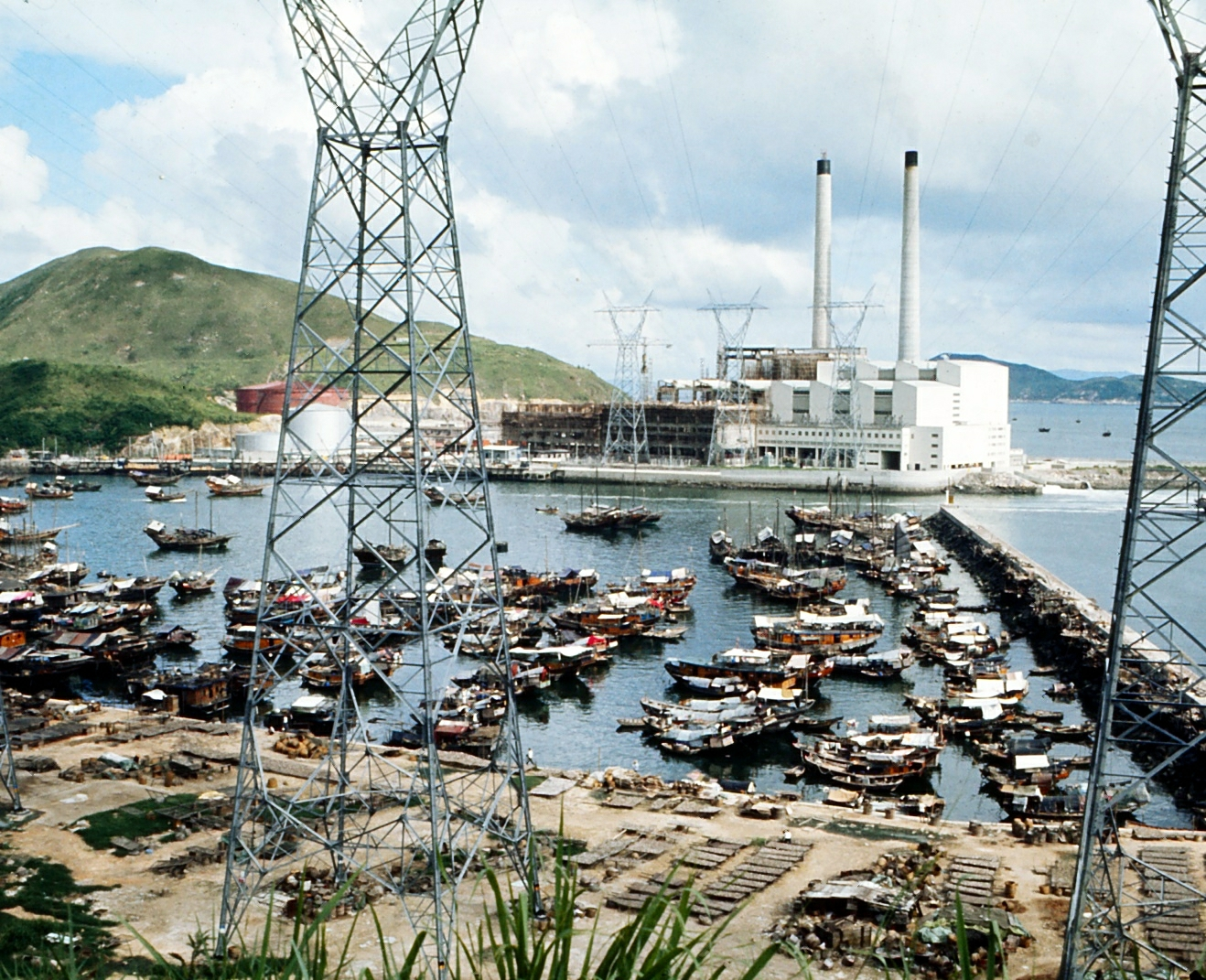
The former Ap Lei Chau Power Station in 1971, viewed from the north, across Aberdeen West Typhoon Shelter.

Map of South Horizons

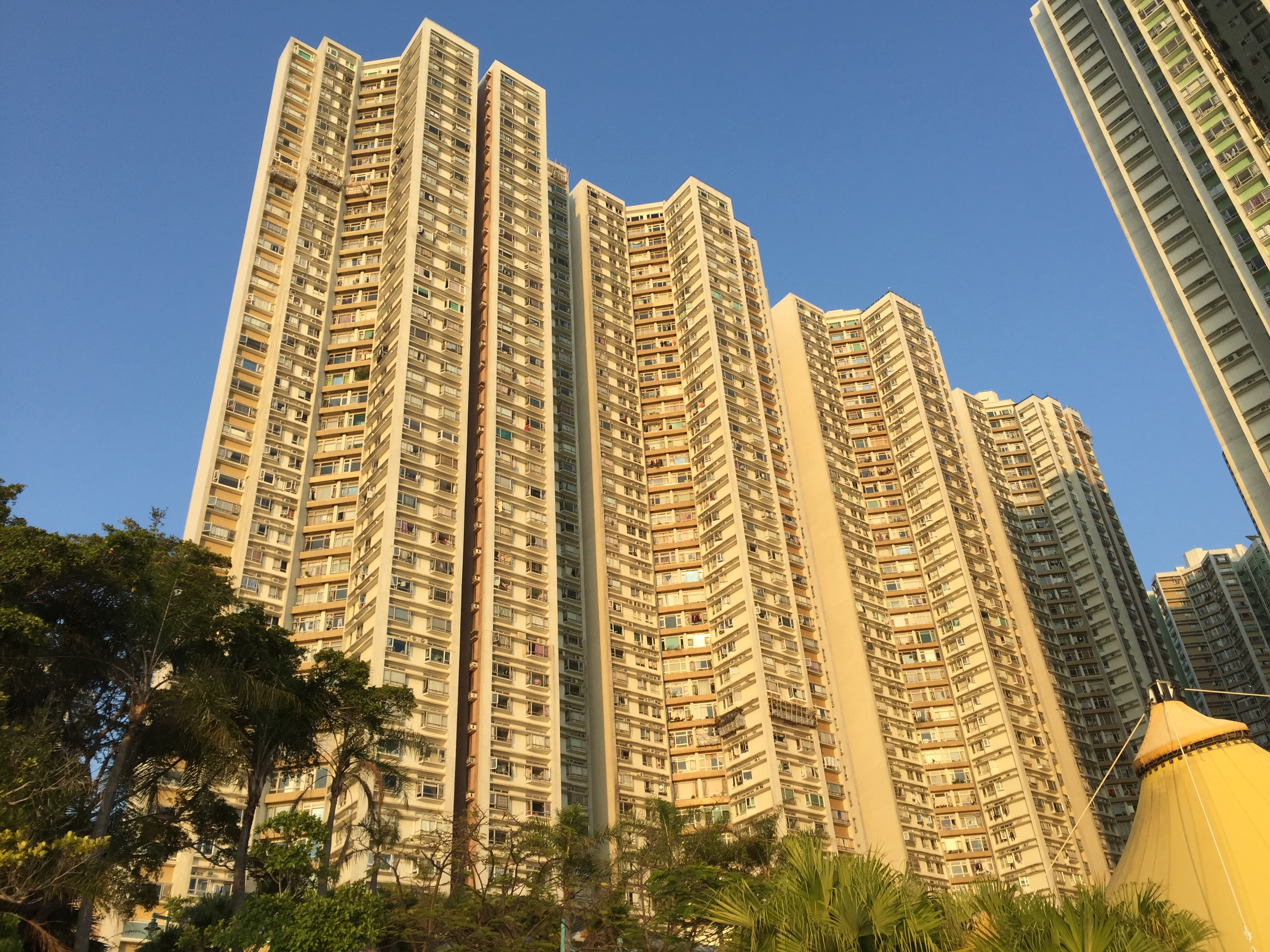
South Horizons buildings

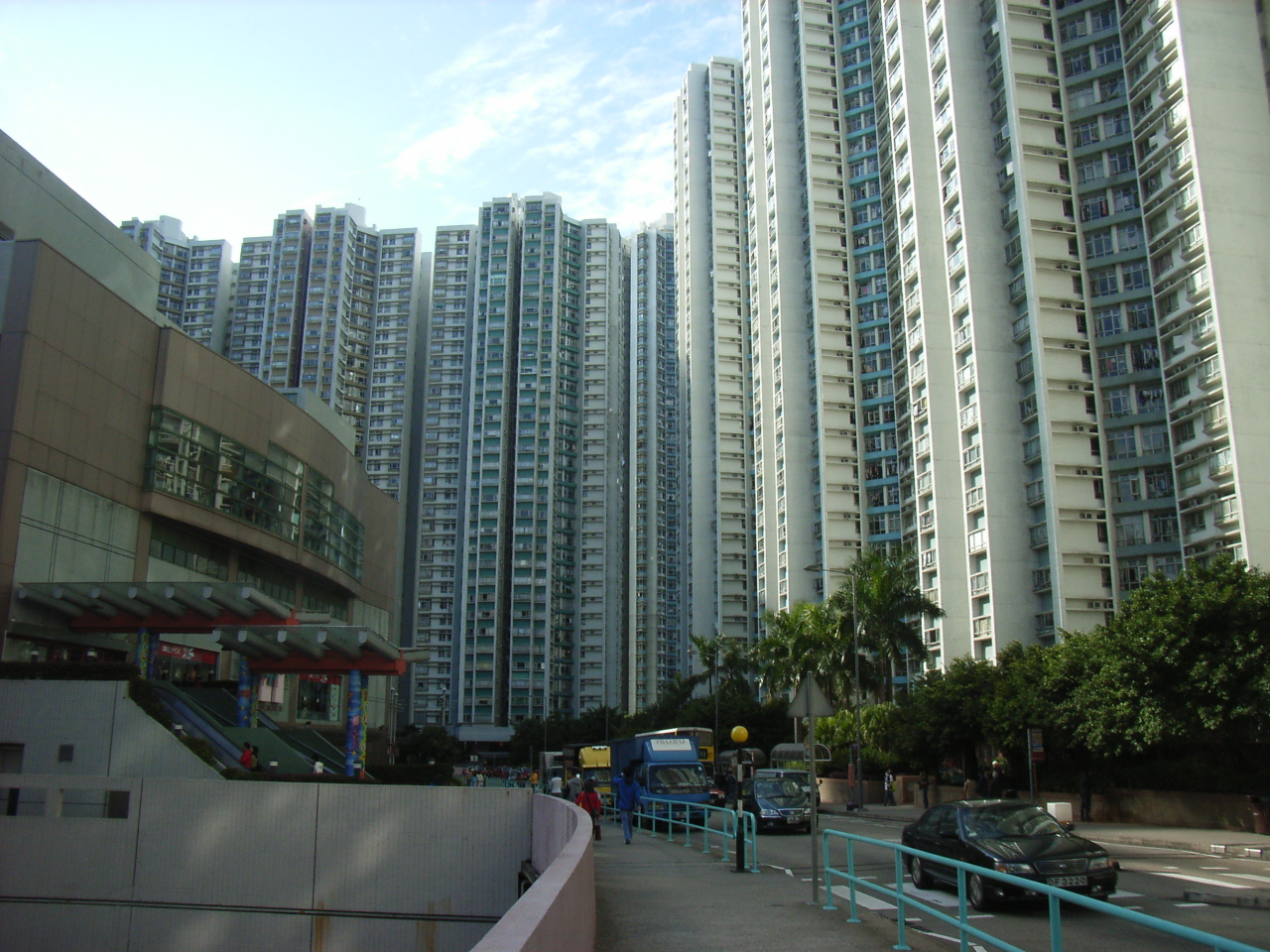
South Horizons Phase II (middle) and Phase I (right), with Marina Square West on the left.

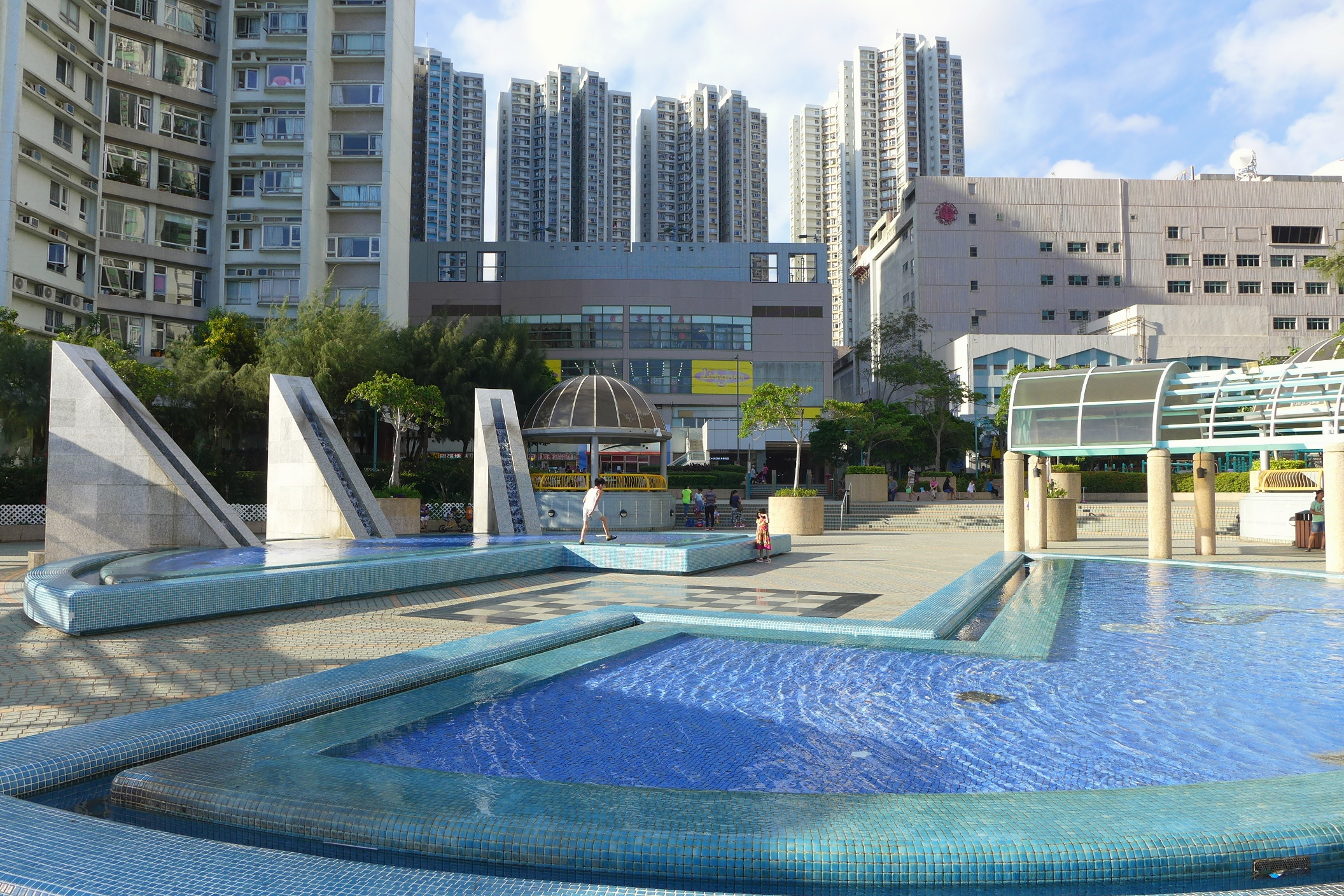
Fountain Plaza. The building housing the operational headquarters of Hongkong Electric is on the right.

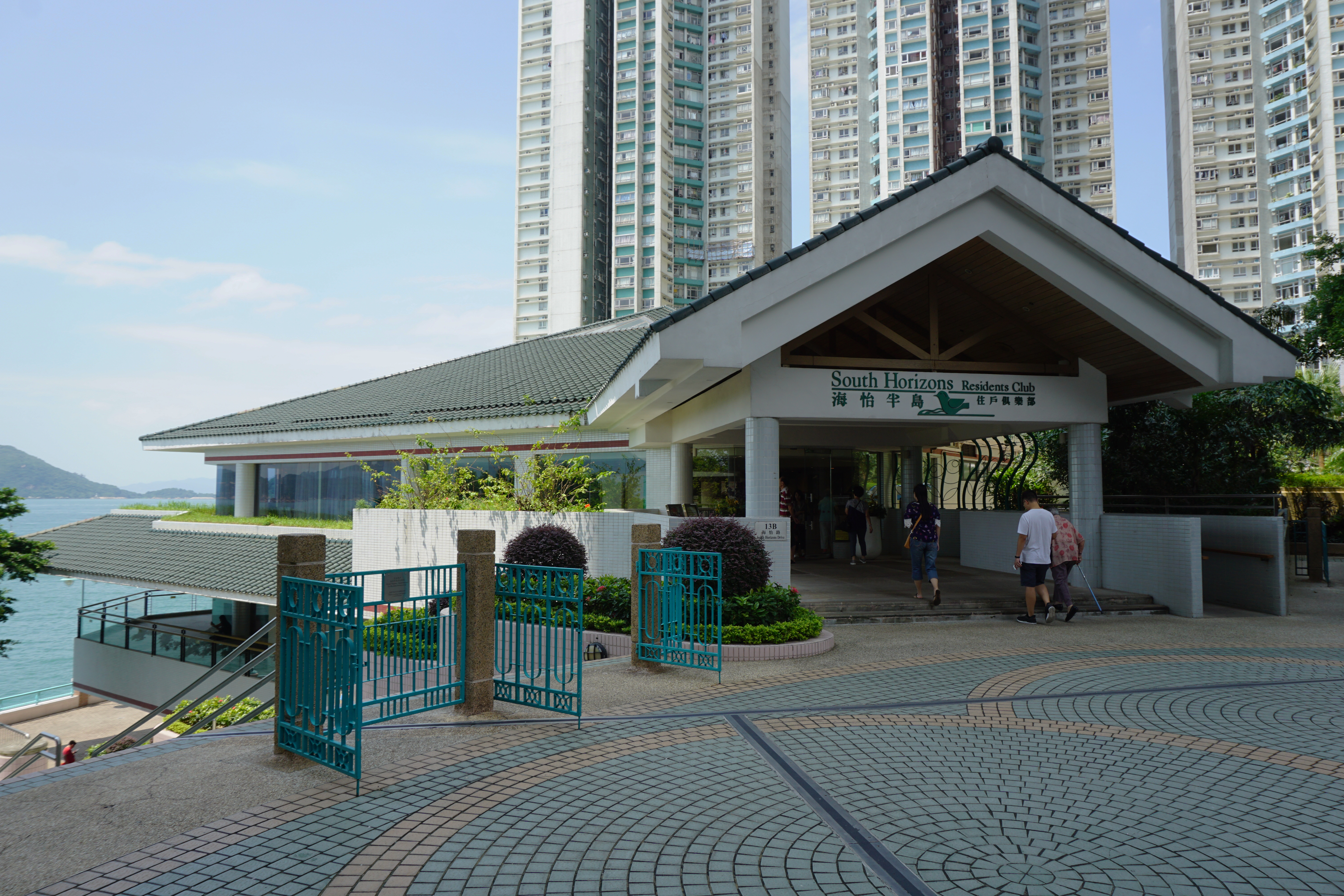
South Horizons Residents Club

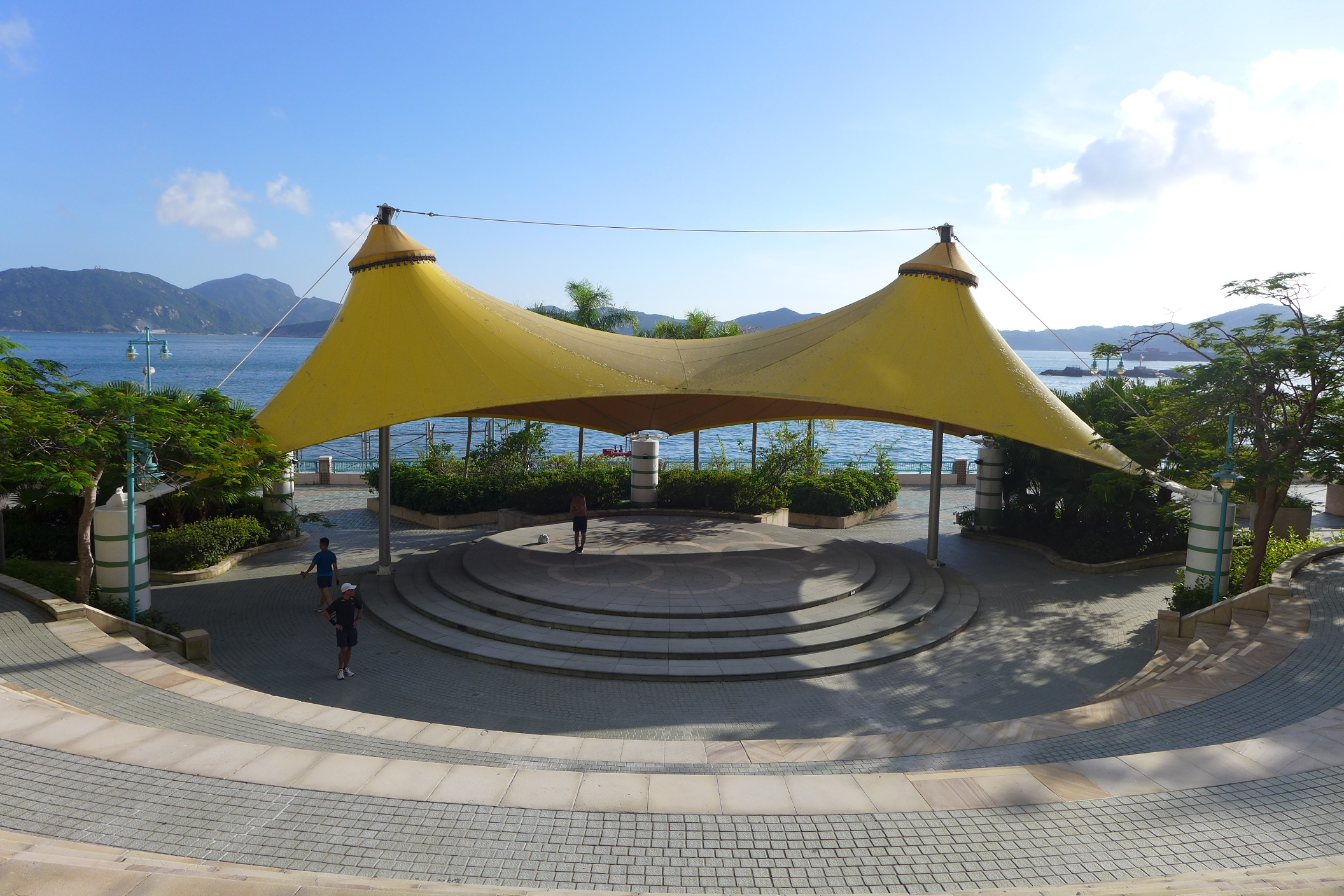
Amphitheatre

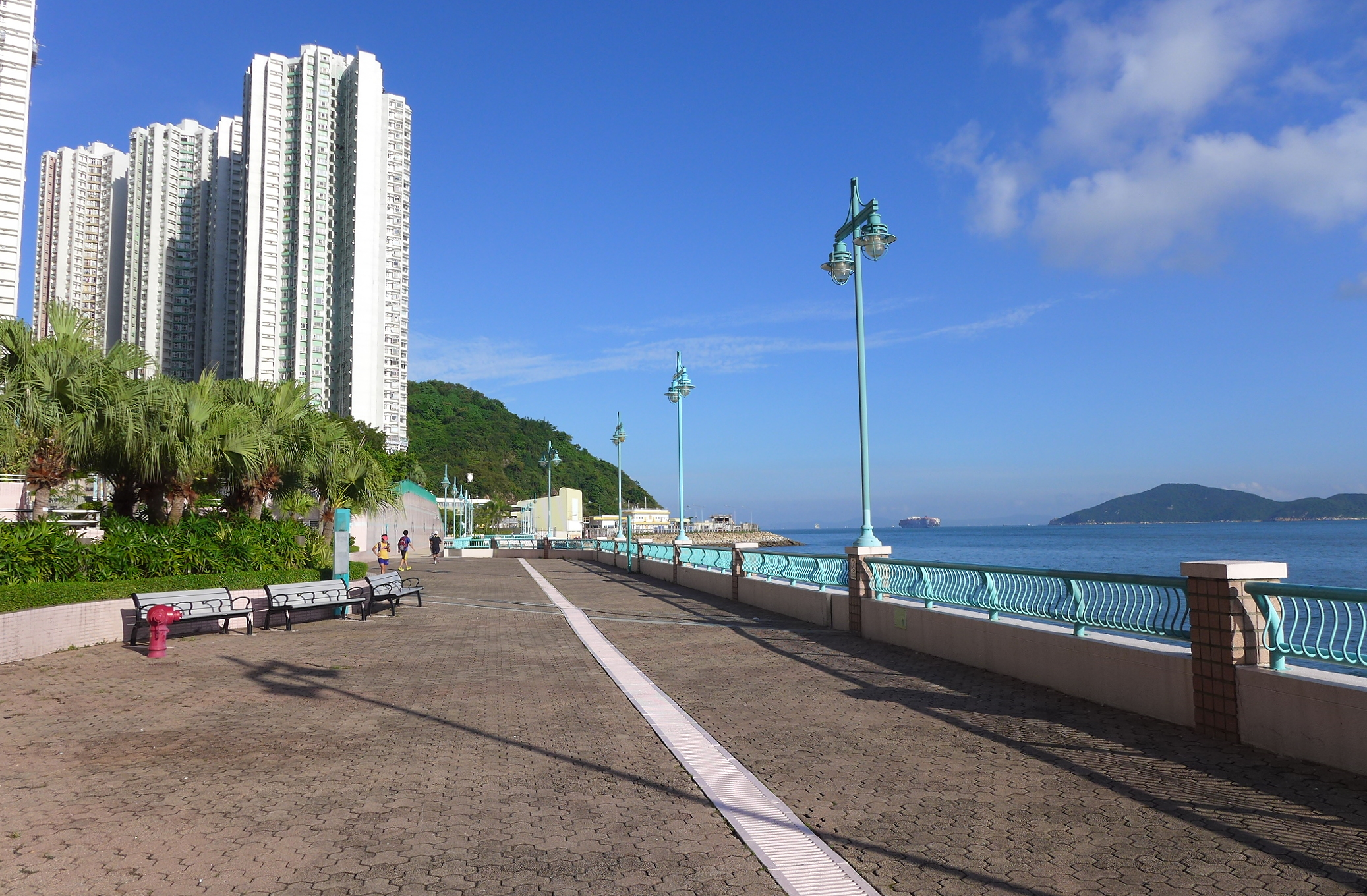
800m long Water Promenade

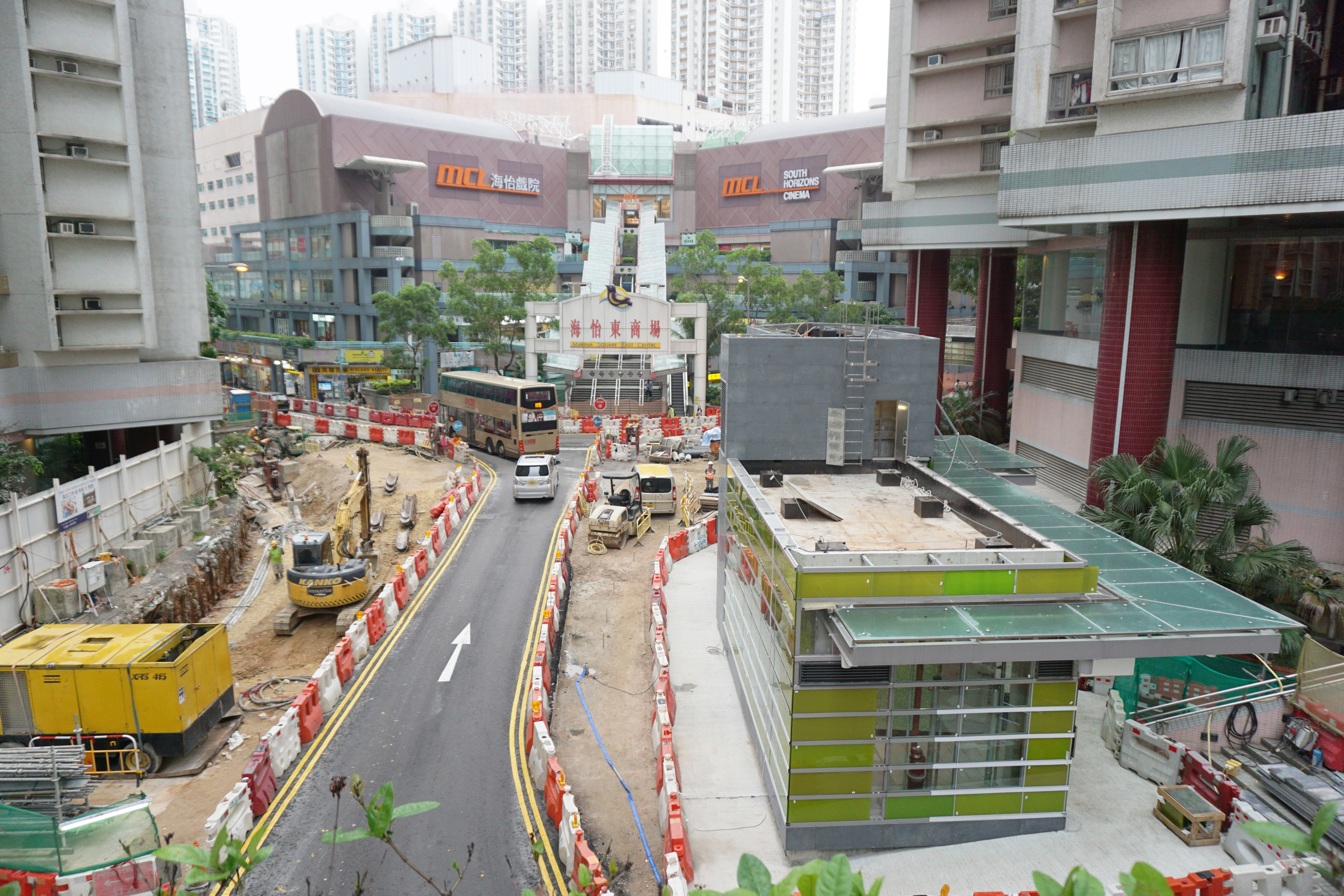
West construction site of South Horizons station in May 2016. The building in the middle is Marina Square East Centre.

South Horizons (Chinese: 海怡半島) is a private housing estate located in Aberdeen at the western end of Ap Lei Chau (a.k.a. Aberdeen Island), in the Southern District of Hong Kong. Developed by Secan Limited, a Hutchison Whampoa associate company, it consists of 34 blocks, ranging in height from 25 to 42 storeys, completed between 1993 and 1995. Census data indicated that South Horizons had a population of 31,496 in 2011 and was the most populated among the private and public estates of the district.

== Description ==
South Horizons was built in four phases, with Phase I and Phase IV closer to Ap Lei Chau Estate, a public housing estate in Aberdeen, Hong Kong. The property is currently owned and managed by Hutchison Whampoa Limited. The estate has a total of 9,812 residential units. It has been described as a "middle-class estate", with a median monthly domestic household income of HK$ 54,300 in 2011.

South Horizons covers two of the 17 constituencies of Southern District Council, South Horizons East and South Horizons West. Each of these two constituencies returns one district councillor to the Southern District Council, with an election every four years.

South Horizons has been marketed as Hutchison Whampoa's second "Garden City" project, the first one being Whampoa Garden, completed in Hung Hom in 1991. More than 50 plant species are cultivated there, and a nature trail along the shore features information boards on tree species. In 2004, Phases II to IV received a Silver Award for Landscape Design as part of the Best Landscape Award for Private Property Development.

== History ==
Prior to modern development, the land occupied by South Horizons was occupied by hillside and village houses, farmlands, and a sea bay. It was acquired by Hongkong Electric in 1964, and the Ap Lei Chau Power Station of Hongkong Electric and an adjoining oil depot of Shell Hong Kong Ltd were built subsequently. The power station was in operation from 1968 to 1989. Its generators were relocated to Lamma Power Station, while the operational headquarters of Hongkong Electric remained on the site. The Shell Oil Depot was in operation between 1970 and the late 1980s. In 1973, failure of the foundations of the oil depot led to 3,600 metric tons of heavy marine diesel oil being released into Picnic Bay and Aberdeen Harbour. Shell replaced its Ap Lei Chau depot, together with another one in Kwun Tong District (current site of Laguna City), by a new site opened in 1991 on the south side of Tsing Yi.

== Property market ==
A new computer balloting scheme was put to use at South Horizons to determine the order in which prospective buyers could purchase flats. It was advanced by the government and developers alike as a replacement for the first-come, first-served sales system, which resulted in long queues plagued by disorder and triad intimidation, for example a 1990 incident where 1,000 triad-led men descended upon a sales queue at another Hutchison Whampoa development, Laguna City. Police and the Consumer Council stated in 1992 that the new system "appeared to be working fairly".

In 1995, the ownership structure of South Horizons Phase IV (a.k.a. The Oasis): Hutchison Whampoa Properties: 50%, Cheung Kong (Holdings): 30%, and Hongkong Electric Holdings: 20%. The introduction of 7 blocks of The Oasis on the market in 1995 was one of the largest that year and was followed by analysts as an indication of the state of the market.

All retail space in the estate is provided at the Marina Square West and Marina Square East shopping centres. Hoping to capitalise on the impending opening of the South Horizons station, the Taiwanese owner of Marina Square West (Estate Dragon Group) issued eviction notices to 30 small businesses housed in the shopping arcade. More than 1,000 residents of South Horizons staged a demonstration in 2014 against the plan to transform the arcade into a "high-end shopping outlet for mainland tourists" in spite of local needs and shopping habits.

== Facilities ==
Facilities of the housing complex include:

- Garden
- Harbour-front Promenade
- Residents Club (near Phase II)
- Playground in every phase
- Car Park

Sports

- 3 swimming pools: 1 indoor and 2 outdoor
- Outdoor Playground (located in Phase IV) including both football and basketball court
- Sports Complex
  - Indoor: squash, table tennis, badminton, snooker, etc.
  - Outdoor: golf practice driving range and tennis courts

Shopping centres

Two shopping centres are located in the middle of the complex: Marina Square West (海怡西商場), managed by Savills, owned by Paliburg Holdings (百利保控股), and Marina Square East (海怡東商場), with a dispersed ownership.

Education

Clubhouse playgroup: one private playgroup organised and located at the sports complex

South Horizons has about five kindergartens. There are also two primary schools:

- Precious Blood Primary School (South Horizons) (next to Marina Square East)
- Hong Kong Southern District Government Primary School (Phase IV)

== Transport ==
Along with South Horizons station of the MTR, there are also numerous bus routes, some of which only go to nearby Ap Lei Chau Estate.

== Demographics ==
According to the 2016 by-census, South Horizons had a population of 30.886. The median age was 41.5 and the majority of residents (85.6 per cent) were of Chinese ethnicity. The average household size was 3.4 people. The median monthly household income of all households (i.e. including both economically active and inactive households) was HK$74,210.

== Politics ==
For the 2019 District Council election, the estate fell within two constituencies. Phase 1 and Phase 2 are located in the South Horizons West constituency, which was formerly represented by Kelvin Lam Ho-por until July 2021, while Phase 3 and The Oasis fall within the South Horizons East constituency, which was formerly represented by James Yu Chun-hei until July 2021.

== Education ==
South Horizons is in Primary One Admission (POA) School Net 18. Within the school net are multiple aided schools (operated independently but funded with government money) and Hong Kong Southern District Government Primary School (香港南區官立小學).

== See also ==
- City Garden, a private housing estate in North Point, was built from 1983 to 1986 by Cheung Kong Holdings on the former site of North Point Power Station of Hongkong Electric.
