= Ap Lei Pai =

Uninhabited island in Hong Kong, linked to the south of Ap Lei Chau by a tombolo

鴨脷排
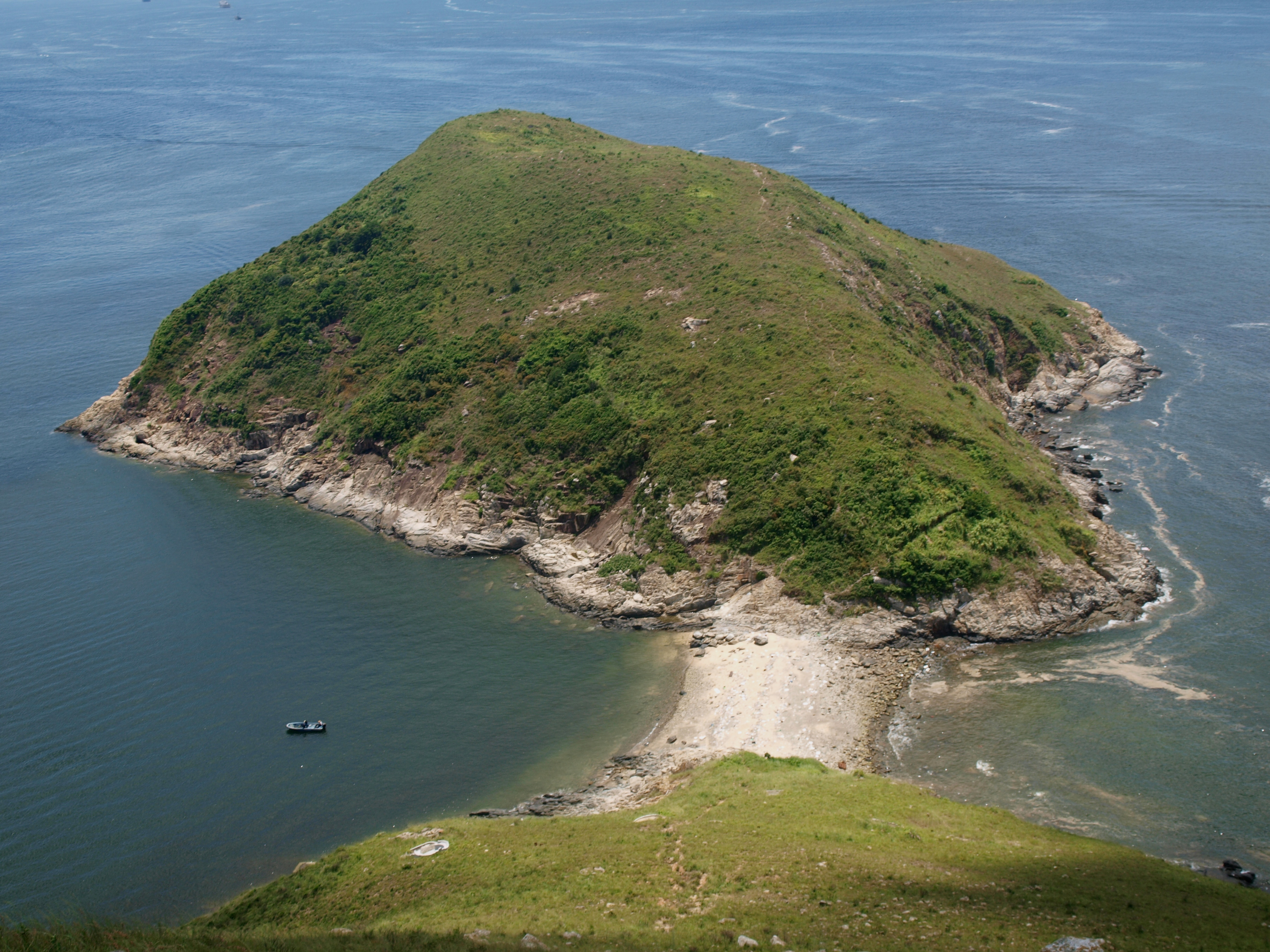
- Ap Lei Pai Island as seen from Ap Lei Chau Island. A tombolo connects the two islands.
- Interactive map of Ap Lei Pai

Geography
- Coordinates: 22°13′50.5554″N 114°9′40.4994″E
- Adjacent to: East Lamma Channel; Aberdeen Channel

Administration
- Hong Kong
- District: Southern District

Demographics
- Population: Uninhabited

Ap Lei Pai
- Traditional Chinese: 鴨脷排
Transcriptions
Yue: Cantonese
- Yale Romanization: Aap leih pàaih
- Jyutping: Aap^{3} lei^{6} paai^{4}

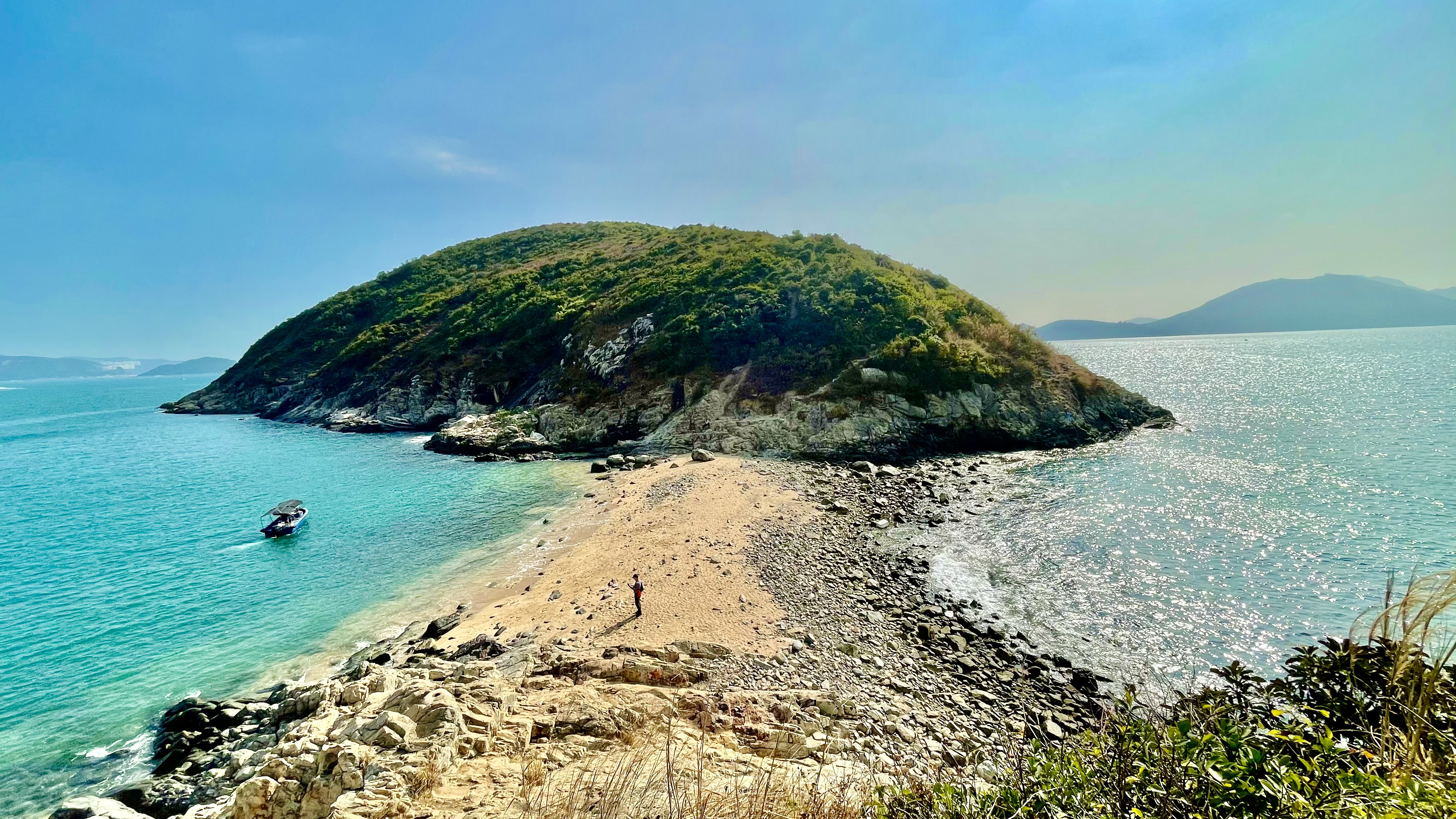
Ap Lei Pai viewed from the Tombolo.

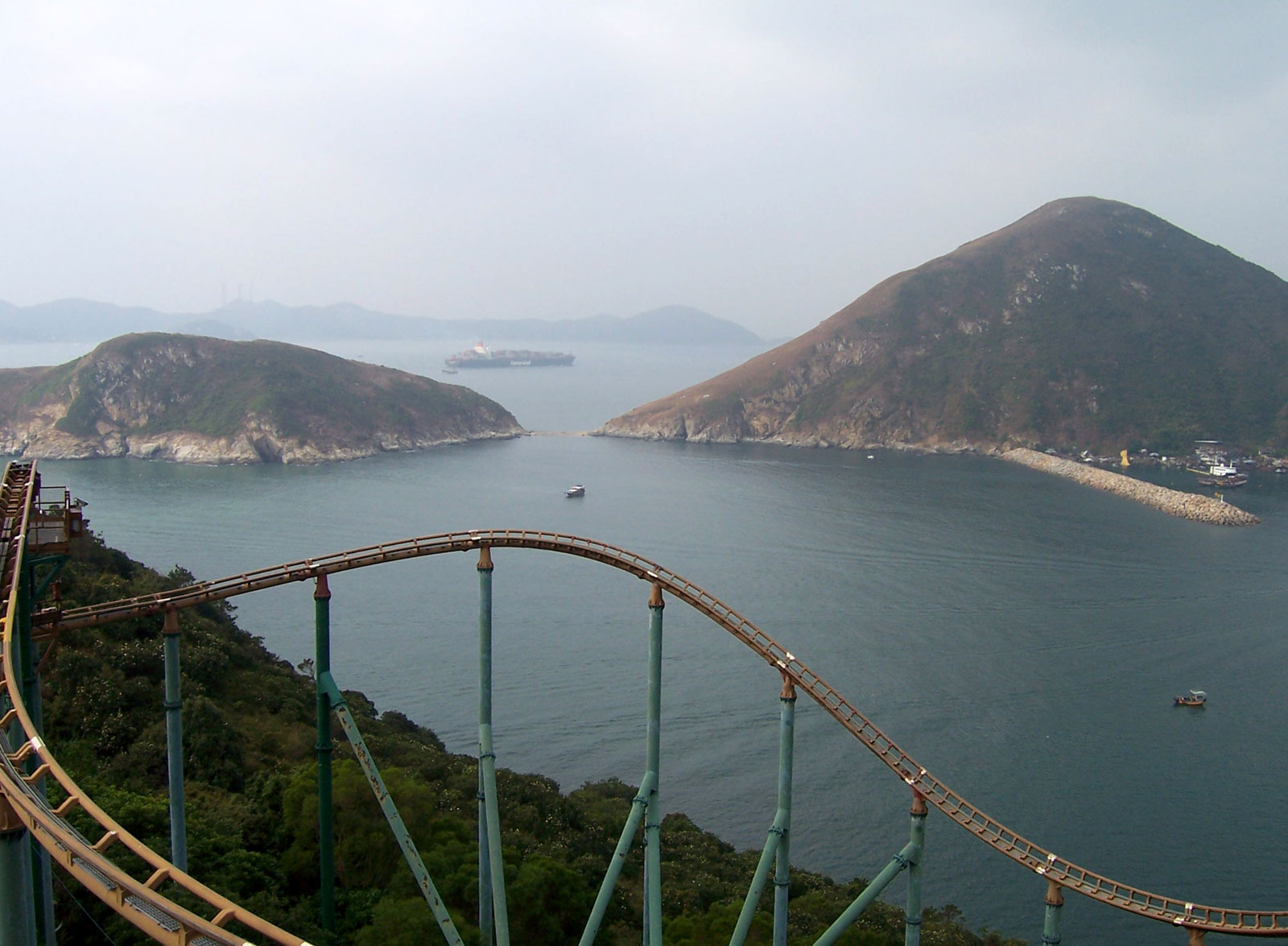
Ap Lei Pai (left) and Ap Lei Chau (right); taken from Ocean Park. Lamma Island is visible in the background.

Ap Lei Pai or Aberdeen Rock is an uninhabited island in Hong Kong, linked to the south of Ap Lei Chau in Hong Kong. It is located between the East Lamma Channel and Aberdeen Channel. The island can be reached by crossing a tombolo connected to the base of Mount Johnston. It is under the administration of the Southern District.

== See also ==
- List of islands and peninsulas of Hong Kong
