= KWG =

KWG may refer to:

- A piece of German law called Kreditwesengesetz which regulates financial transactions.
- Kaba Deme language; ISO 639-3 language code KWG
- Kaiser Wilhelm Institute (Kaiser Wilhelm Gesellschaft), Germany
- Kew Gardens station (London), England; National Rail station code KWG
- Kite Wind Generator general wind power
- Kitegen (Kite Wind Generator), wind power from high altitude winds
- Koolewong railway station, New South Wales, Australia; station code KWG
- Koninklijk Wiskundig Genootschap, the Royal Dutch Mathematical Society
- Kryvyi Rih International Airport, Ukraine; IATA airport code KWG
- KWG (AM), a radio station (1230 AM) licensed to serve Stockton, California, United States
- KWG Property, a property developer in Guangzhou, China
