= Ap Lei Chau Power Station =

Former power station in Hong Kong

Ap Lei Chau Power Station 鴨脷洲發電廠
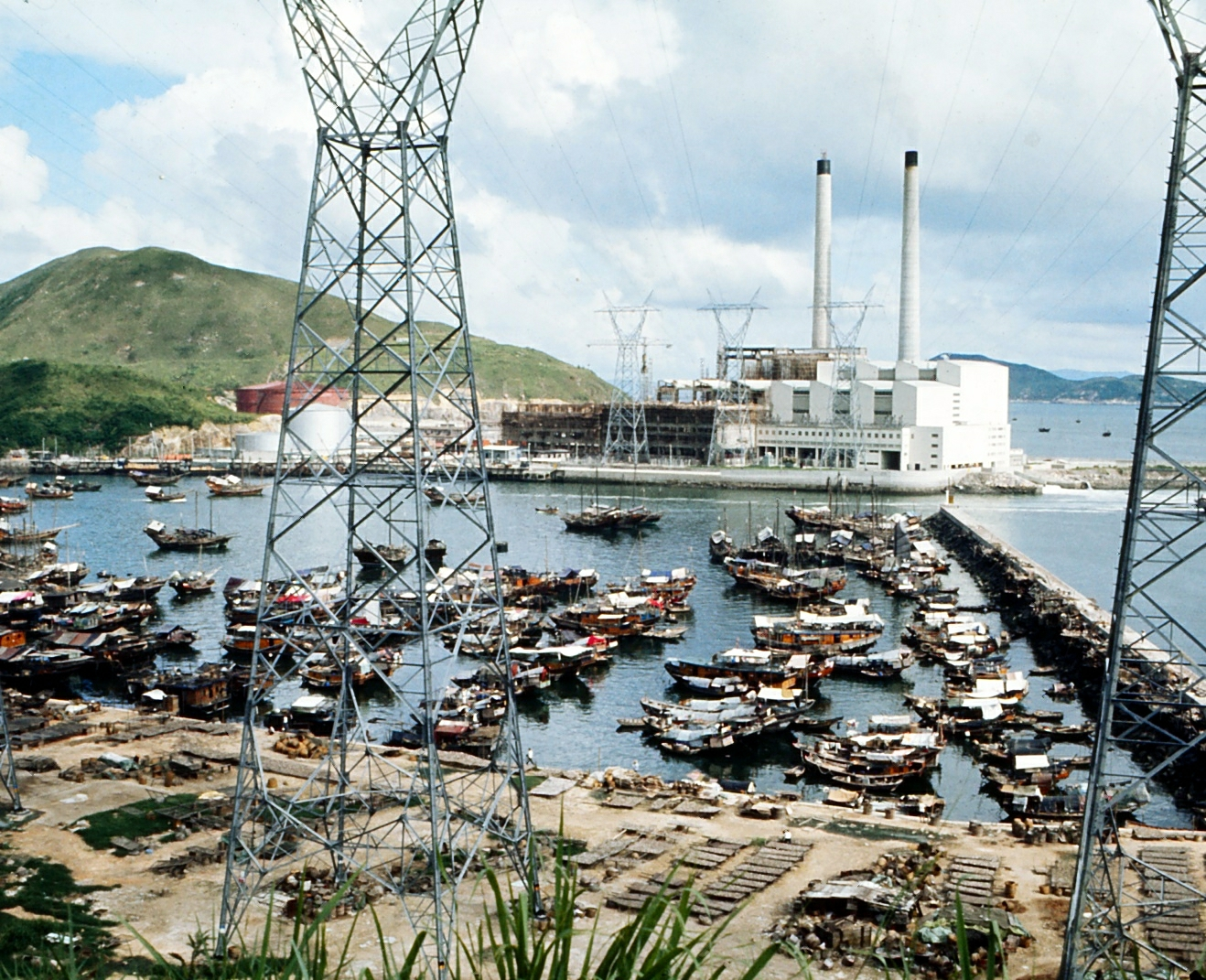
- Country: British Hong Kong
- Location: Ap Lei Chau
- Coordinates: 22.243717°N 114.147521°E
- Status: Decommissioned
- Commission date: 1968
- Decommission date: 1989

Power generation
- Nameplate capacity: 750 MW

External links
- Commons: Related media on Commons

Ap Lei Chau Power Station
- Traditional Chinese: 鴨脷洲發電廠
Transcriptions
Yue: Cantonese
- Yale Romanization: Aap leih jāu faat dihn chóng
- Jyutping: Aap3 lei6 zau1 faat3 din6 cong2

The Ap Lei Chau Power Station was an oil-fired power station in Ap Lei Chau, Hong Kong.

== History ==
The power station was commissioned in 1968 and was the largest power station in British Hong Kong at that time. The power station was decommissioned starting in 1984 and eventually closed in 1989. Its generators were then moved to Lamma Power Station. The area around the power station is now surrounded by the South Horizons residential area.

== Generation ==
The power station provided electricity to the western area of Hong Kong.

== See also ==
- List of power stations in Hong Kong
- Hongkong Electric Company
