= Ap Lei Chau =

Island in Hong Kong

鴨脷洲
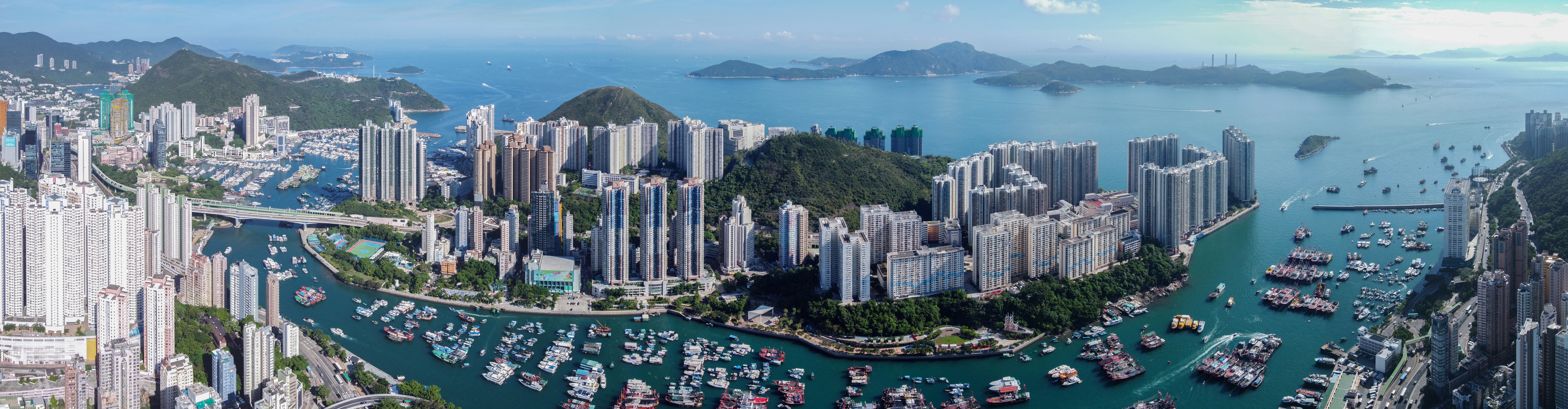
- Aerial view of Ap Lei Chau, across Aberdeen Harbour (2021)

- Location of Ap Lei Chau within Hong Kong

Geography
- Location: South of Hong Kong Island
- Coordinates: 22°14′30″N 114°9′20″E
- Area: 1.3 km^{2} (0.50 sq mi)
- Highest elevation: 196 m (643 ft)
- Highest point: Mount Johnston

Administration
- Hong Kong
- District: Southern District

Demographics
- Population: 79,727 (2021)
- Pop. density: 61,328/km^{2} (158839/sq mi)

Ap Lei Chau
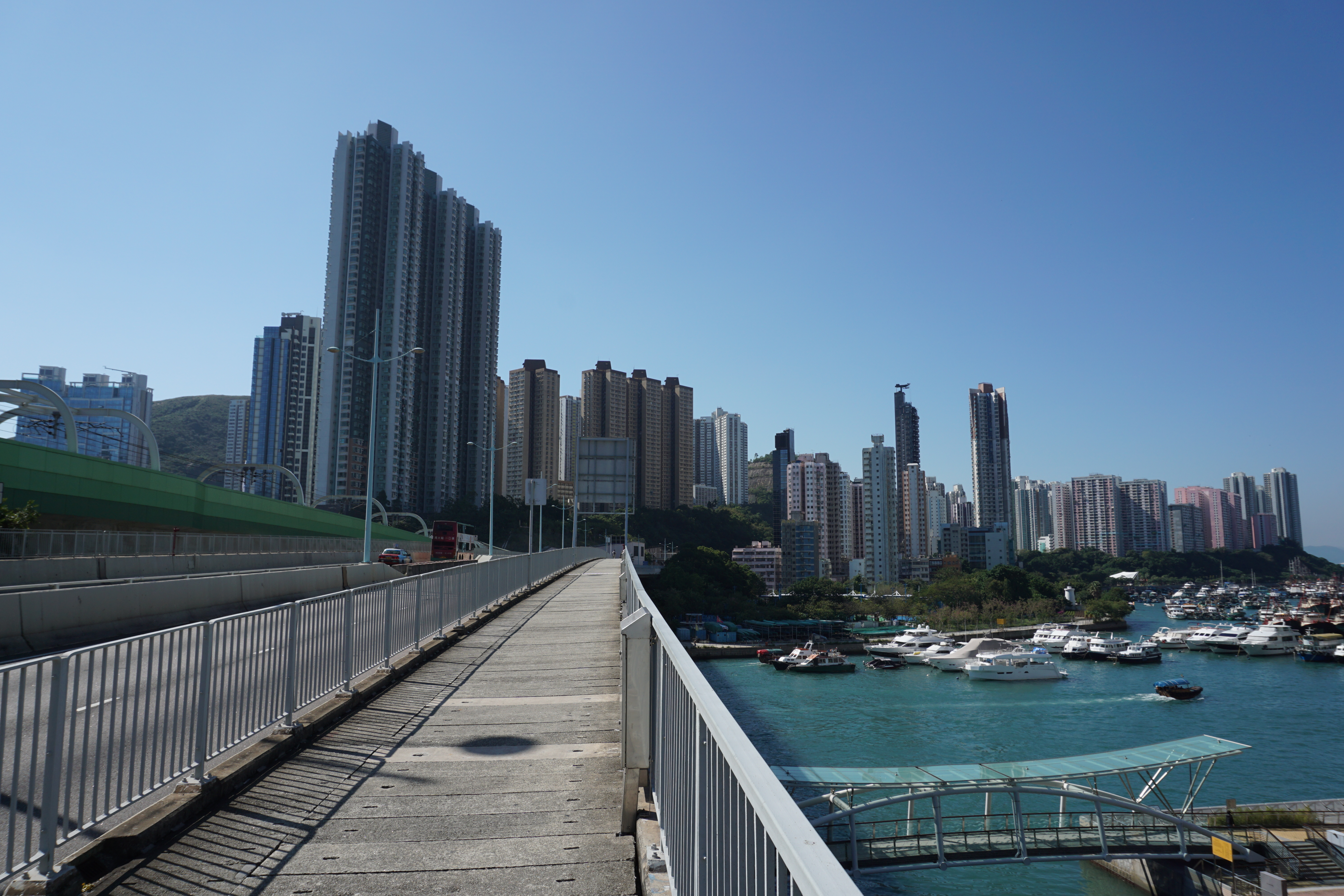
- Ap Lei Chau viewed from Ap Lei Chau Bridge in 2016
- Traditional Chinese: 鴨脷洲
- Simplified Chinese: 鸭脷洲
- Cantonese Yale: Aap Leih Jāu
- Literal meaning: Duck-Tongue Island
Transcriptions
Standard Mandarin
- Hanyu Pinyin: Yālìzhōu
- Wade–Giles: Ya-li-chou
Hakka
- Romanization: Ap^{5} Li^{4} Ziu^{1}
Yue: Cantonese
- Yale Romanization: Aap Leih Jāu
- Jyutping: Aap^{3} Lei^{6} Zau^{1}

Ap Lei San
- Traditional Chinese: 鴨脷山
- Simplified Chinese: 鸭脷山
- Literal meaning: Duck-Tongue Island; Duck-Tongue Mountain
Transcriptions
Standard Mandarin
- Hanyu Pinyin: Yālìshān
- Wade–Giles: Ya-li-shan

Hong Kong Village
- Chinese: 香港村
- Literal meaning: Fragrant Harbour Village
Transcriptions
Standard Mandarin
- Hanyu Pinyin: Xiānggǎngcūn

Ap Lei Chau or Aberdeen Island is an island of Hong Kong, located off Hong Kong Island next to Aberdeen Harbour and Aberdeen Channel. It has an area of 1.30 square kilometres (0.50 sq mi) after land reclamation. Administratively it is part of the Southern District. Ap Lei Chau is one of the most densely populated islands on earth.

In the 2000s, the Guinness World Records called it the world's most densely populated island on their website.

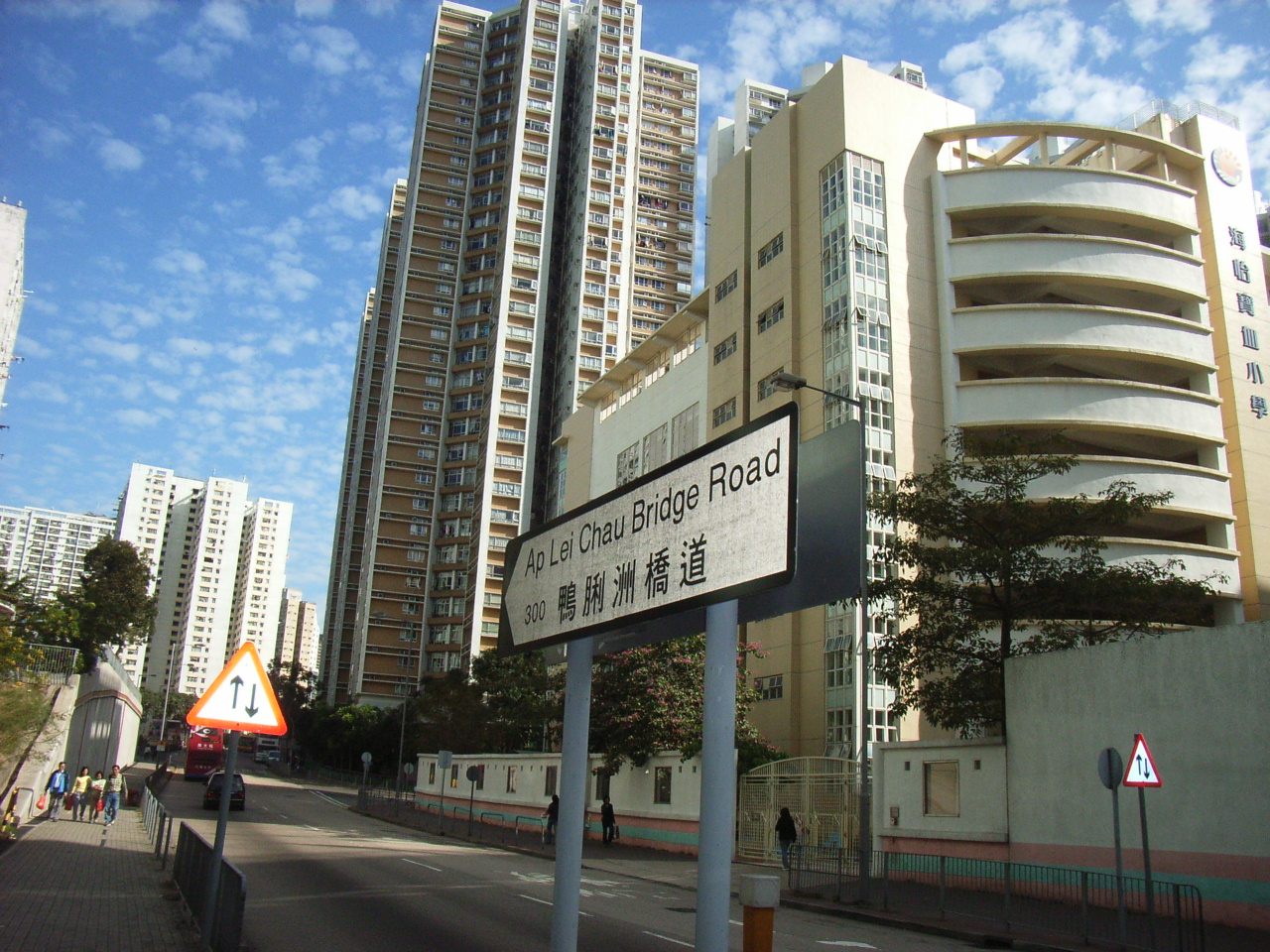
Ap Lei Chau Bridge Road on Ap Lei Chau

== History ==
Before the First Opium War, Ap Lei Chau was a small fishing village, with its harbour forming an excellent natural typhoon shelter. The island appears on a Ming-era map with its primary settlement labelled "Fragrant Harbour Village". Its early phonetic rendering of the Cantonese phrase hēung góng is the probable origin of the name for Hong Kong, although the town eventually took the name of its island.

Under the terms of the 1841 Treaty of Nanking, it was ceded to the British together with Hong Kong Island. It was sometimes known as Taplichan, Taplishan, &c. from an alternative name for the island.

The island had a largely uneventful history under British rule.

In 1968, Hongkong Electric opened a power station on Ap Lei Chau to provide electricity for the whole of Hong Kong Island. In 1980 and 1994, a bridge was constructed to connect the island to the Hong Kong Island, and this created momentum for rapid economic development. Public housing estates were built to accommodate people, including some who had suffered in a fire in the Aberdeen typhoon shelter. In 1989, the generators of the power station were relocated to Lamma Island, and the old power station has been demolished and re-developed into the South Horizons residential area, with the addition of some land reclaimed from the sea.

== Geography and demographics ==
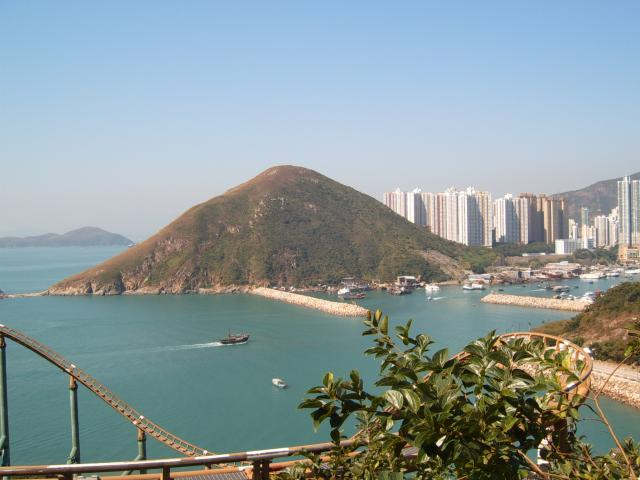
Mount Johnston on Ap Lei Chau, viewed from Ocean Park

Ap Lei Chau was named after the shape of the island, which resembles the tongue of a duck. Ap means duck, Lei means tongue, and Chau means island. The northern part has the highest population, while the southern part of the island is less densely populated.

The highest point on the island is Yuk Kwai Shan (玉桂山; aka. Mount Johnston), with an altitude of 196 metres (643 ft).

It comprises four main residential areas — Lei Tung Estate, Ap Lei Chau Main Street, South Horizons and Ap Lei Chau Estate, each of which comprises several highrise towers. There is also an industrial estate on the southern tip of the island.

The population of Ap Lei Chau is 79,727. The sum of the population in constituency areas D02 to D07 and its area is 1.30 square kilometres (0.50 square miles), giving it a population density of 61,328 inhabitants per square kilometre (158,840/sq mi) and making it the fourth most densely populated island in the world.

Population per District Council Constituency Area
	District Council Constituency Area	Population (2021)
D02	Ap Lei Chau Estate	12,089
D03	Ap Lei Chau North	11,897
D04	Lei Tung I	12,307
D05	Lei Tung II	14,043
D06	South Horizons East	14,444
D07	South Horizons West	14,947
	Total	79,727

Ap Lei Chau also lends its name to the Ap Lei Chau geologic formation, which covers most of Hong Kong Island.

== Places of interest ==
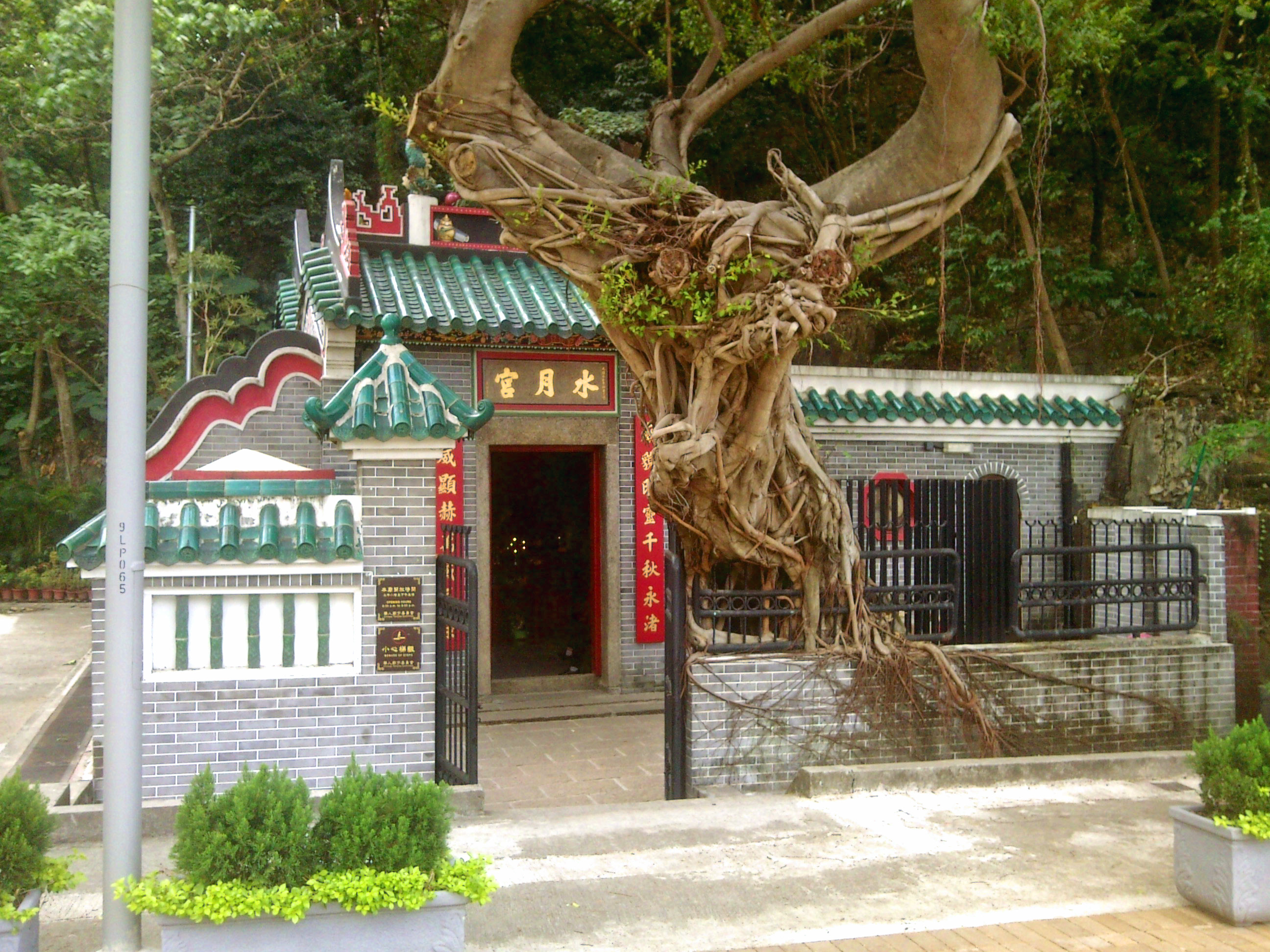
Shui Yuet Temple on Ap Lei Chau

The Hung Shing Temple located on Hung Shing Street, off Main Street, Ap Lei Chau, is a notable site. Dating back to 1773, it is the oldest temple in the Aberdeen and Ap Lei Chau areas and is a declared monument.

The Shui Yuet Temple aka. Kwun Yum Temple is located at No. 181 Main Street, Ap Lei Chau. Dedicated to Kwun Yum, it was built at the end of the 19th century and is a Grade III historic building. The temple site is adjacent to the site of the former Aberdeen Police Station. Clearly chosen for its fung shui, the superior dragons were seen as being protection from the 'threat of the tiger's jaw' from the police station. Although the police station has now been demolished, the dragons are still present and seen as enduring feng shui guards. Apart from Kwun Yum, the temple also houses Kwan Tai, Tin Hau, Chai Kung and Wong Tai Sin.

== Transport ==
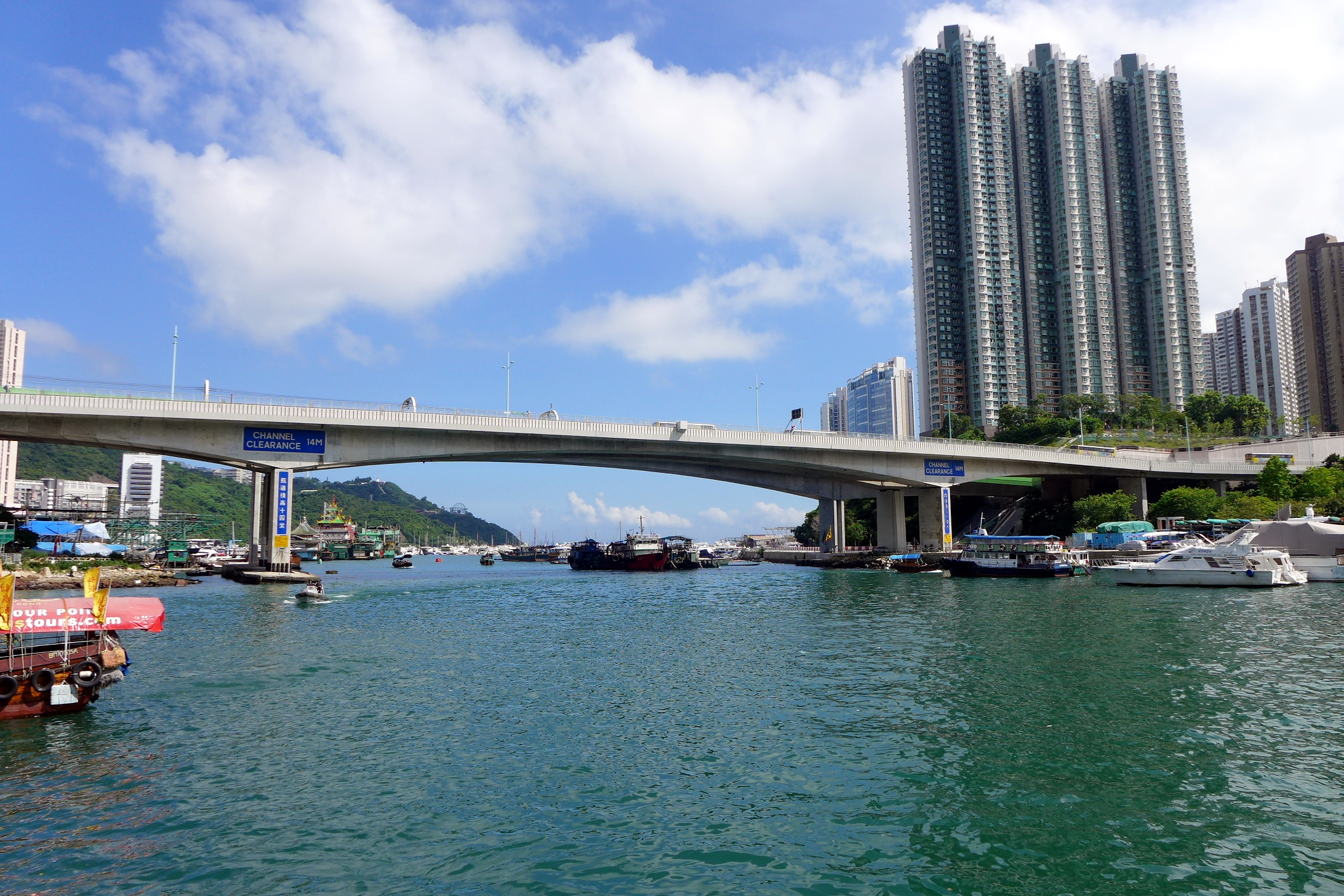
Ap Lei Chau Bridge

Ap Lei Chau and Hong Kong Island are connected by the four-lane Ap Lei Chau Bridges. Opened in 1983, it originally only had two lanes, and was widened to four in 1994 with a duplicated bridge to the northwest of the original one.

Buses are the main form of transport for the residents in Ap Lei Chau. Bus routes depart from the six bus termini on the island to various places on Hong Kong Island and in Kowloon:

- Ap Lei Chau Estate
- Ap Lei Chau (Lee Lok Street) and Ap Lei Chau (Lee King Street) in the industrial area
- Ap Lei Chau Main Street
- Lei Tung Estate
- South Horizons

Green minibuses and taxis are available. Red minibuses are prohibited from entering the island.

There is a regular sampan service running between Ap Lei Chau Main Street and Aberdeen. (Service hours: 6am-12am)

The MTR South Island line opened on 28 December 2016 links Admiralty of Hong Kong Island to Ap Lei Chau by the Aberdeen Channel Bridge, to the southeast of the Ap Lei Chau Bridges. There are two stations on the island: Lei Tung (for Lei Tung Estate and Ap Lei Chau Main Street) and South Horizons (for South Horizons, Ap Lei Chau Estate and Ap Lei Chau Industrial Estate).

== Education ==
Ap Lei Chau is in Primary One Admission (POA) School Net 18. Within the school net are multiple aided schools (operated independently but funded with government money) and Hong Kong Southern District Government Primary School (香港南區官立小學) in Ap Lei Chau. Aided primary schools in Ap Lei Chau in POA 18 include Aplichau Kaifong Primary School (鴨脷洲街坊學校) and St Peter's Catholic Primary School (聖伯多祿天主教小學), both in Lei Tung Estate, as well as Precious Blood Primary School (South Horizons) (海怡寶血小學).

Hong Kong Public Libraries operates the Ap Lei Chau Public Library in the Ap Lei Chau Municipal Services Building.

== Community issues ==
Since Ap Lei Chau is currently the fourth most densely populated island in the world, public space is highly insufficient. In 2016, the Hong Kong Government reallocated the waterfront land of the former Hong Kong Driving School on Lee Nam Road for building luxury apartments, ignoring the suggestion of the locals and intensified the problem of insufficient land use. In February 2017, it was reported that the land, measuring 11,761 square metres (126,590 sq ft), had been sold by tender for a record price of HK$16.86 billion (US$2.17 billion) to a venture between KWG Property and Logan Property Holdings.

== See also ==
- Ap Lei Pai
- List of places in Hong Kong
- List of islands and peninsulas of Hong Kong
- Shek Pai Wan
- Magazine Island

== See also ==
- List of islands by population density
