= Mount Johnston (Hong Kong) =

Mountain in Hong Kong

Mount Johnston, Hong Kong
- 玉桂山
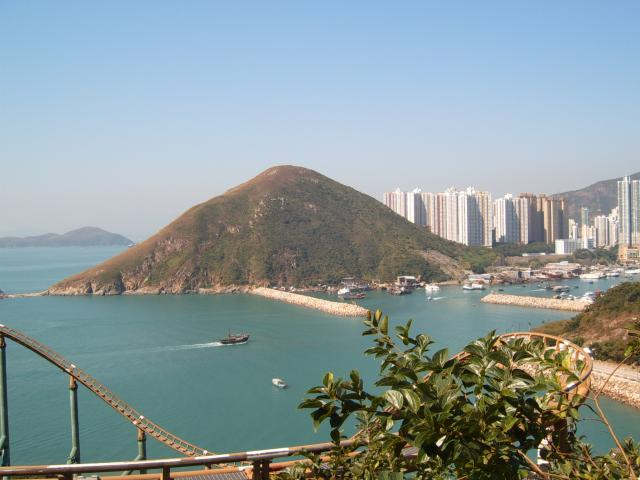
- View of Mount Johnston

Highest point
- Elevation: 196 m (643 ft)
- Coordinates: 22°14′17″N 114°09′24″E

Geography
- Location within Hong Kong
- Location: Hong Kong

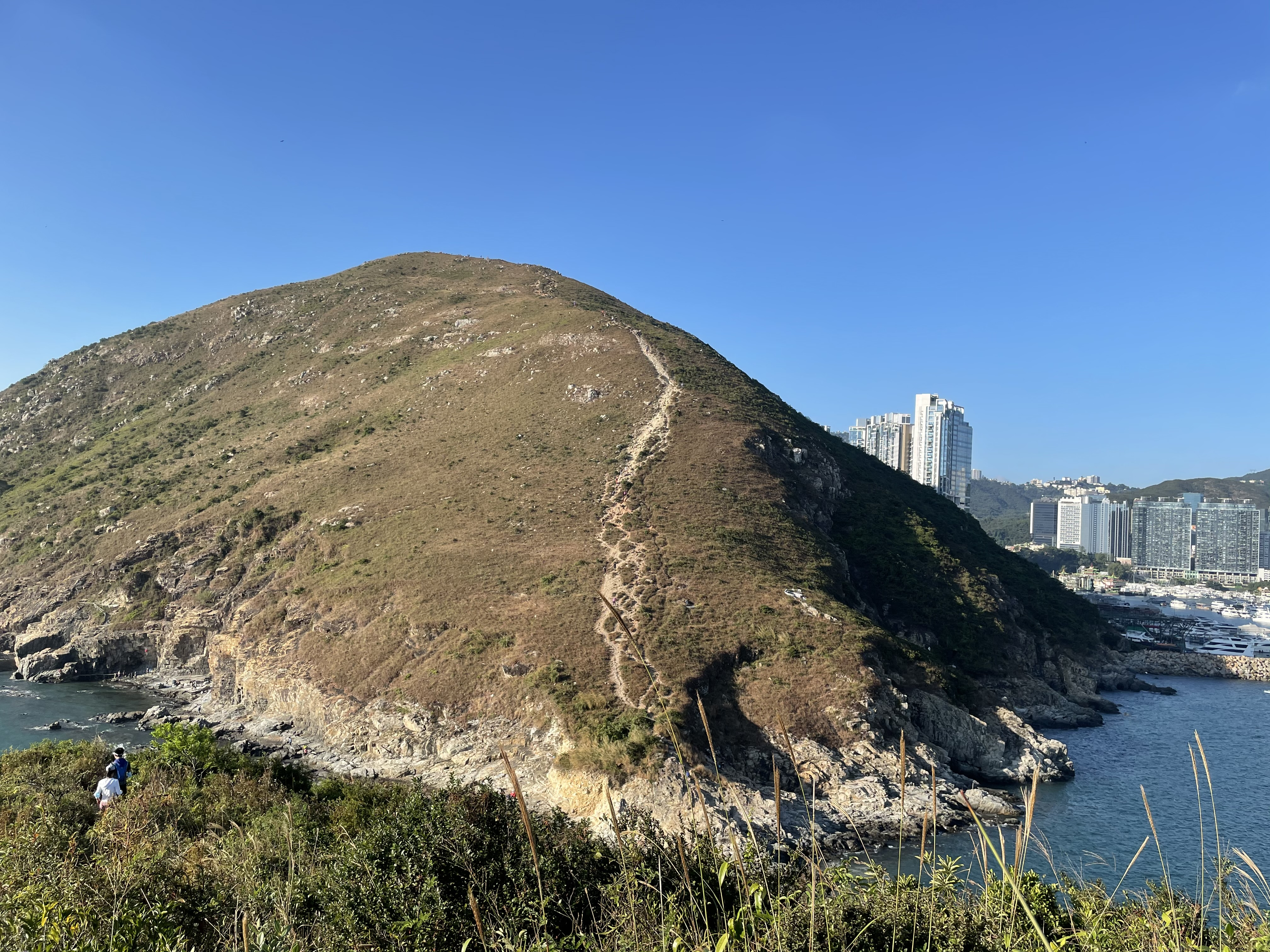
Mount Johnston viewed from Ap Lei Pai

Mount Johnston (Chinese: 玉桂山), also known as Yuk Kwai Shan, is a hill located on the island of Ap Lei Chau in Hong Kong. The hill is 196m in height and is a popular site for hiking. A narrow tombolo connects the ocean facing shore of Mount Johnston to Ap Lei Pai.

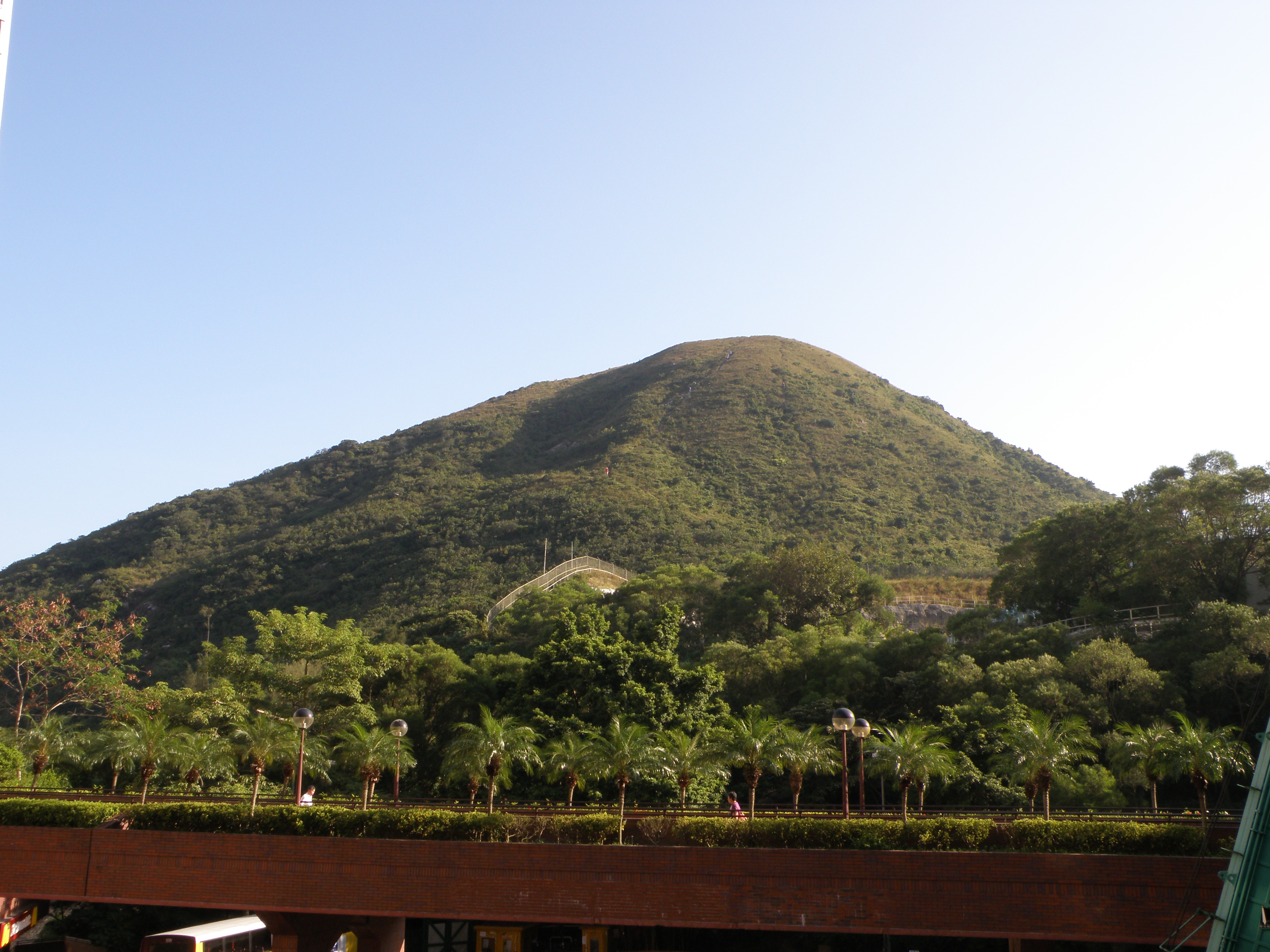
Summit of Yuk Kwai Shan

== History ==
This hill is named after Alexander Robert Johnston (14 June 1812 – 21 January 1888), a British colonial official who served twice as Acting Administrator of Hong Kong from 1841 to 1842.

== Fake Yuk Kwai Shan ==
A nearby summit lower than Mount Johnston's (i.e. Yuk Kwai Shan) main peak houses leisure facilities by the government and is called Fake Yuk Kwai Shan by the local hiking community.

== Hiking ==
The steep incline of this hill means that parts of trail leading to its summit from the south side require the use of a rope installed on the mountain.

== Road access ==
There is no road access up the hill.

== See also ==
- List of mountains, peaks and hills in Hong Kong
