= Aberdeen Channel =

Channel between Ap Lei Chau and Nam Long Shan

Coordinates: 22°13′58.4″N 114°9′51.2″E

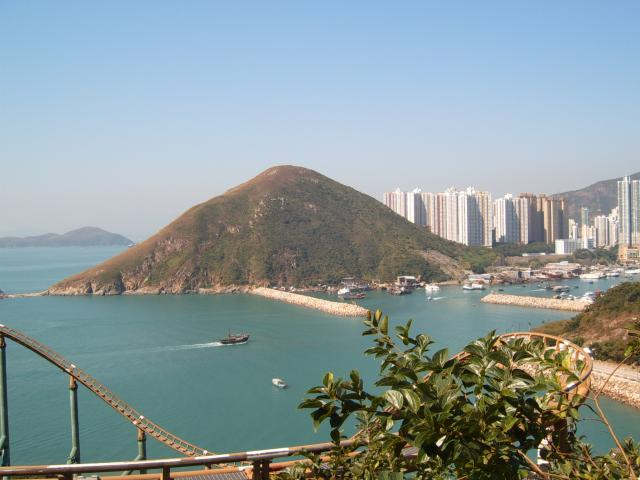
Aberdeen Channel

Aberdeen Channel (Chinese: 香港仔海峽) is a channel between the east side of Ap Lei Chau (Aberdeen Island) and Nam Long Shan (Brick Hill) on Hong Kong Island in Hong Kong. With two bays, Po Chong Wan and Tai Shue Wan, major portions of the channel are transformed into Aberdeen South Typhoon Shelter. As the channel approaches the north end of Ap Lei Chau it becomes Aberdeen Bay.
