= KWG Property =

Property development company in Guandong, China

KWG Group Holdings
- Native name: 合景泰富集團
- Type: Privately owned company
- Industry: Real estate
- Founded: 1995
- Headquarters: Guangzhou, Guangdong, China
- Area served: People's Republic of China
- Key people: Chairman: Mr. Kong Jian Min
- Website: www.kwgproperty.com/en

KWG Group Holdings (SEHK: 1813) is one of the largest privately owned property developers in Guangzhou, Guangdong, China. It is engaged in the development of residential, commercial and hotel properties in Guangzhou, Suzhou, Kunshan, Chengdu and Beijing. In particular, KWG is focusing on developments in the Zhujiang New Town, a new central business district in Guangzhou and the venue of the Asian Games in 2010.

The company was established in 1995 and listed on the Hong Kong Stock Exchange in 2007.

== See also ==
- Real estate in China
- Australian Villa
