= Ap Lei Chau Estate =

Public housing estate in Ap Lei Chau, Hong Kong

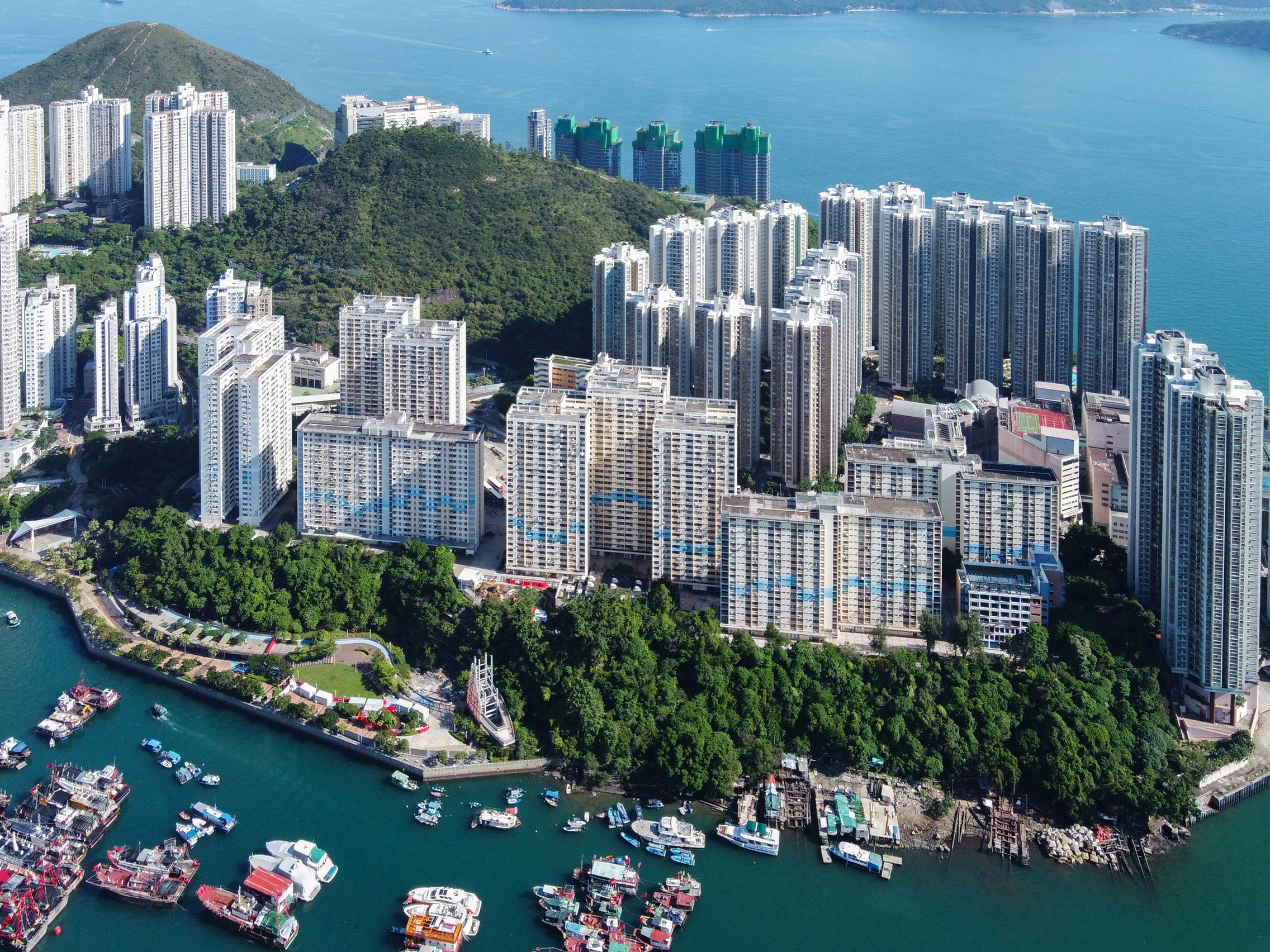
- Ap Lei Chau Estate
- Interactive map of Ap Lei Chau Estate

General information
- Location: 322 Ap Lei Chau Bridge Road, Ap Lei Chau; Hong Kong Island, Hong Kong
- Coordinates: 22.244705°N 114.1498625°E
- Status: Completed
- Category: Public rental housing
- Population: 14,504 (2016)
- No. of blocks: 8
- No. of units: 4,453

Construction
- Constructed: 1980; 46 years ago
- Authority: Hong Kong Housing Authority

Ap Lei Chau Estate (Chinese: 鴨脷洲邨) is a public housing estate in Ap Lei Chau, Hong Kong Island, Hong Kong. It is the first public housing estate in Ap Lei Chau. Completed in two phases in 1980 to 1982, respectively, the estate consists of 8 residential blocks providing 4,453 flats. It was one of the public housing estates built from 1980 to 1982 to accommodate people affected by a major fire in Aberdeen Typhoon Shelter.

== Houses ==
Name	Chinese name	Building type	Completed
Lei Ning House	利寧樓	Old Slab	1981
Lei Yee House	利怡樓	Old Slab	1981
Lei Tim House	利添樓	Old Slab	1980
Lei Chak House	利澤樓	Triple H	1980
Lei Fook House	利福樓	Double H	1982
Lei Moon House	利滿樓	Double H	1982

== Demographics ==
According to the 2016 by-census, Ap Lei Chau Estate had a population of 14,504. The median age was 53.1, and the majority of residents (97.1 per cent) were of Chinese ethnicity. The average household size was 2.8 people. The median monthly household income of all households (i.e. including both economically active and inactive households) was HK$21,650.

== Politics ==
Ap Lei Chau Estate is located in Ap Lei Chau Estate constituency of the Southern District Council. It is currently represented by Lam Yuk-chun, who was elected in the 2019 elections.

== See also ==
- Public housing estates in Pok Fu Lam, Aberdeen and Ap Lei Chau
