= D'Aguilar Peninsula =

Peninsula in Hong Kong

Coordinates: 22°13′40″N 114°14′40″E

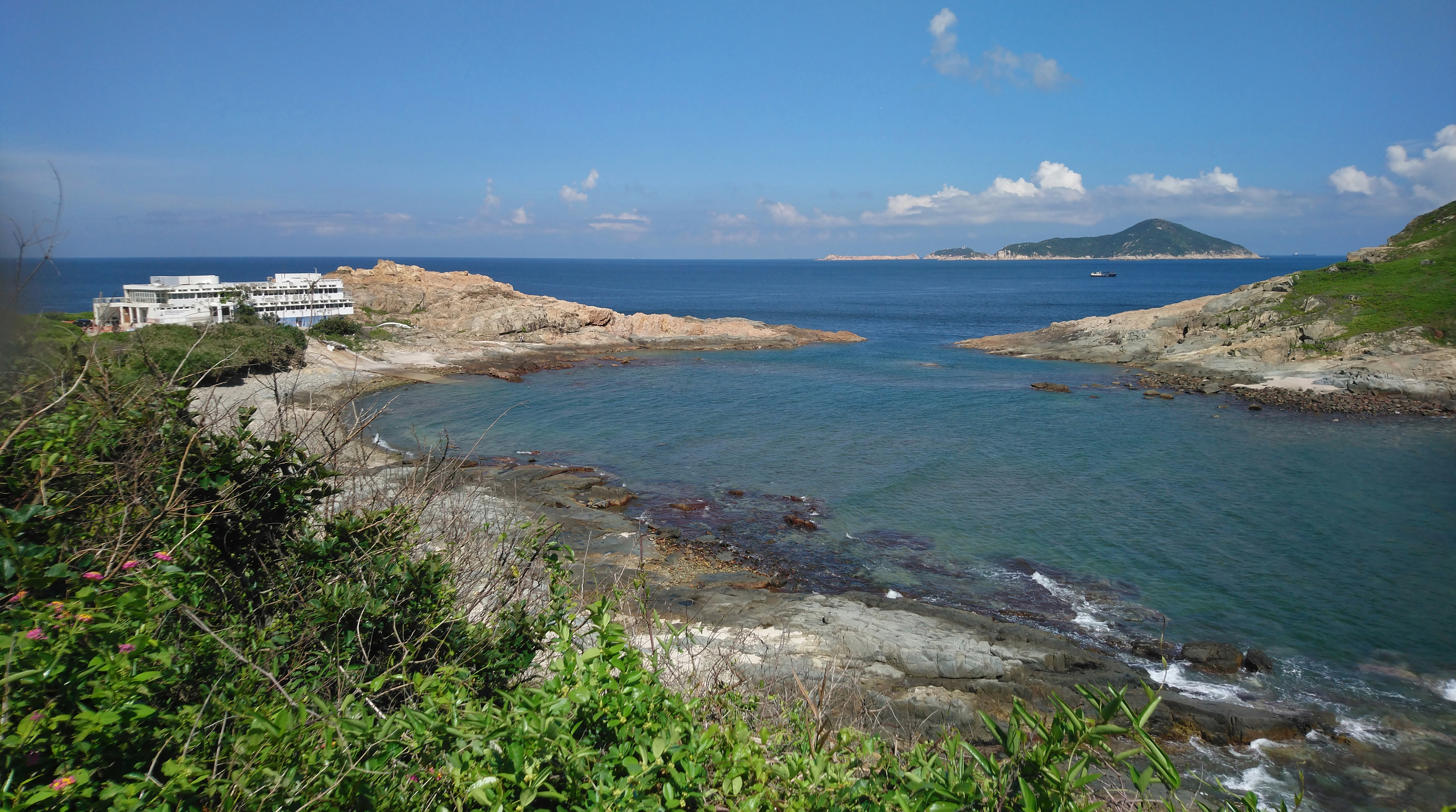
Cape D'Aguilar, at the southeastern part of D'Aguilar Peninsula.

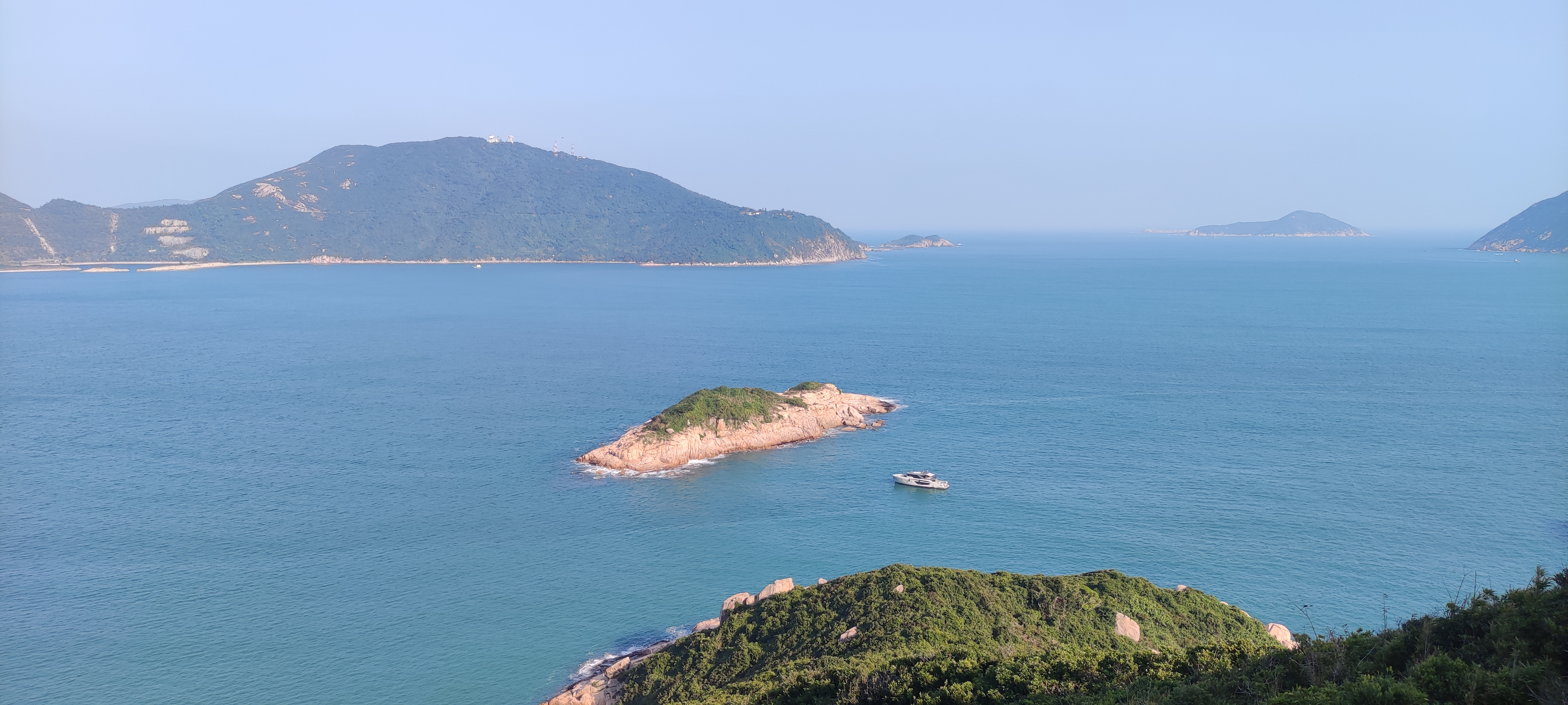
View of D'Aguilar Peninsula across Tai Tam Bay.

D'Aguilar Peninsula (Chinese: 鶴咀半島) is located in southeastern Hong Kong Island, in the Southern District of Hong Kong. It is named after Major-General Sir George Charles d'Aguilar.

Cape D'Aguilar is located in the southeastern part of D'Aguilar Peninsula. "Hok Tsui" (Chinese: 鶴咀) actually refers to a different cape to the southwest of the peninsula.

== Conservation ==
A site located on the north-western slope of D'Aguilar Peak and south of Windy Gap, covering an area of 5 hectares (12 acres), was designated as a Site of Special Scientific Interest in 1975.

== See also ==
- Shek O Country Park
