= List of schools in Southern District, Hong Kong =

This is a list of schools in Southern District, Hong Kong.

== Secondary schools ==
Aided

- Aberdeen Baptist Lui Ming Choi College
- Aberdeen Technical School (香港仔工業學校)
- Caritas Chong Yuet Ming Secondary School (明愛莊月明中學))
- Hong Kong Sea School (香港航海學校)
- Hong Kong True Light College
- Pui Tak Canossian College (嘉諾撒培德書院)
- Pui Ying Secondary School (培英中學)
- Sacred Heart Canossian College
- San Wui Commercial Society Chan Pak Sha School (新會商會陳白沙紀念中學)
- SKH Lui Ming Choi Secondary School (聖公會呂明才中學)
- St Peter's Secondary School (聖伯多祿中學)
- Yu Chun Keung Memorial College No. 2 (余振強紀念第二中學)

Direct Subsidy Scheme

- HKUGA College (港大同學會書院)
- St Stephen's College

English Schools Foundation

- South Island School
- West Island School

Private

- Canadian International School
- German Swiss International School (Pok Fu Lam Campus)
- Han Academy (漢鼎書院)
- Hong Kong International School
- Independent Schools Foundation Academy
- Singapore International School
- The Harbour School (港灣學校)
- Victoria Shanghai Academy (滬江維多利亞學校)
- Wycombe Abbey School Hong Kong (香港威雅學校)

== Primary schools ==
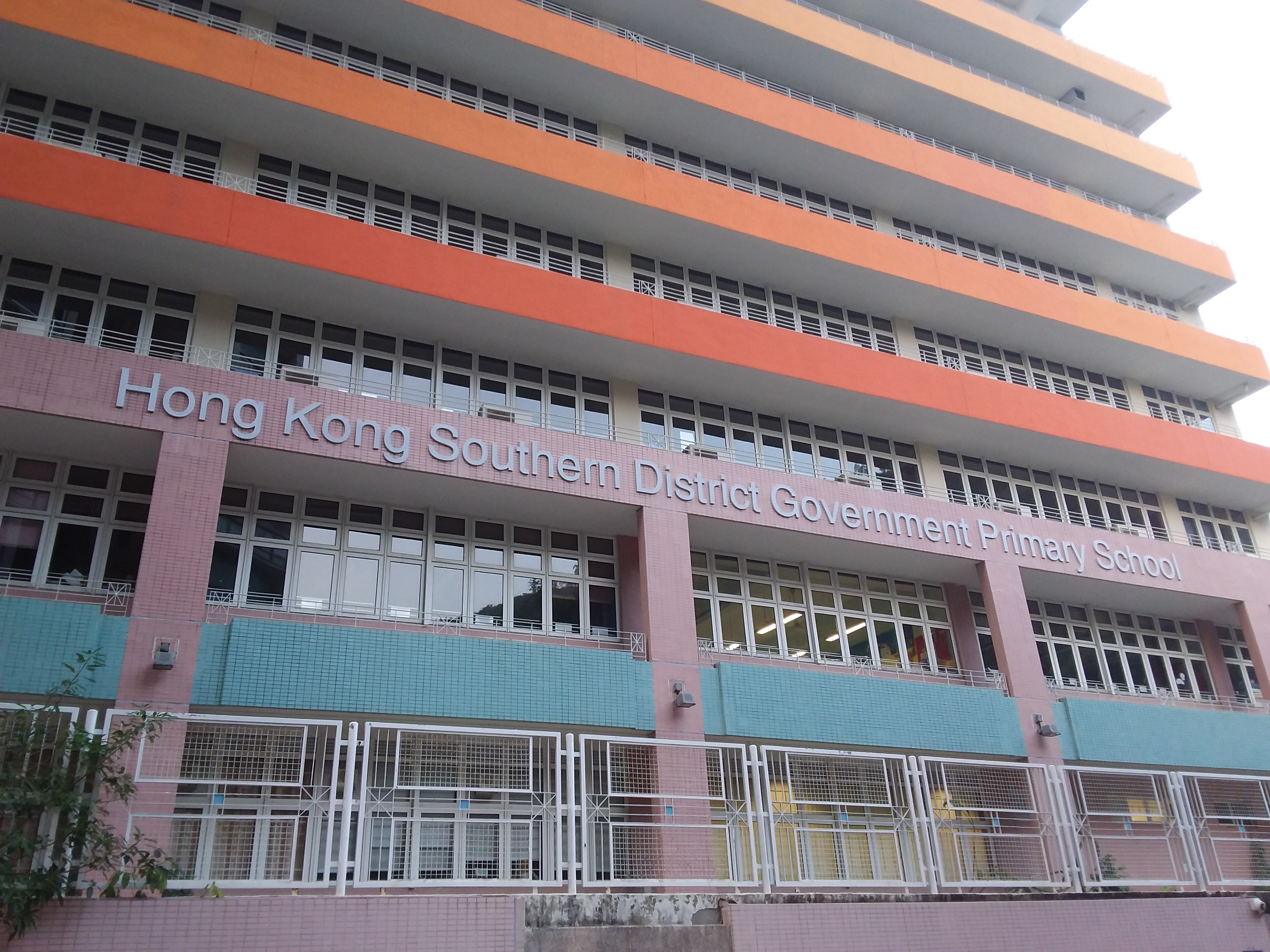
Hong Kong Southern District Government Primary School

Government

- Hong Kong Southern District Government Primary School (香港南區官立小學)
- Island Road Government Primary School (香島道官立小學)

Aided

- Aberdeen St Peter's Catholic Primary School (香港仔聖伯多祿天主教小學)
- Aplichau Kaifong Primary School (鴨脷洲街坊學校)
- Precious Blood Primary School (South Horizons) (海怡寶血小學)
- Precious Blood Primary School (Wah Fu Estate) (華富邨寶血小學)
- Pui Tak Canossian Primary School (嘉諾撒培德學校)
- SKH Chi Fu Chi Nam Primary School (聖公會置富始南小學)
- SKH Tin Wan Chi Nam Primary School (聖公會田灣始南小學)
- St Peter's Catholic Primary School (聖伯多祿天主教小學)
- TWGH Hok Shan School (東華三院鶴山學校)

Direct Subsidy Scheme

- St Paul's Co-Edu College Primary School (聖保羅男女中學附屬小學)
- St Paul's College Primary School (聖保羅書院小學)

English Schools Foundation

- Kennedy School

Private

- German Swiss International School (Pok Fu Lam Campus)
- Kellett School
- Singapore International School
- St Stephen's College Preparatory School (聖士提反書院附屬小學)
- The Harbour School (港灣學校)
- Victoria Shanghai Academy (滬江維多利亞學校)
- Wycombe Abbey School Hong Kong (香港威雅學校)

== Special schools ==
Aided

- Ebenezer New Hope School (心光恩望學校)
- Ebenezer School (心光學校)
- HK Juvenile Care Centre Chan Nam Cheong Memorial School (香港青少年培育會陳南昌紀念學校)
- Hong Kong Red Cross John F. Kennedy Centre (香港紅十字會甘迺迪中心)
- Hong Kong Red Cross Hospital Schools The Duchess of Kent Children's Hospital at Sandy Bay (香港紅十字會醫院學校)
- Hong Kong Red Cross Hospital Schools Queen Mary Hospital (香港紅十字會醫院學校)
- Marycove School (瑪利灣學校)
- TWGH Tsui Tsin Tong School (東華三院徐展堂學校)

== Former schools ==
- Pokfulam Government Primary School - Now the German Swiss School Pok Fu Lam Campus.
