= West Island line and South Island line =

West Island line and South Island line may refer to several Hong Kong MTR lines:

- West Island line, an extension of the Island line westwards from Sheung Wan to Kennedy Town stations
- South Island line, a line from Admiralty to South Horizon stations
- South Island line (West), a proposed line from HKU to Wong Chuk Hang stations

== See also ==
- History of the South Island line and West Island line
