= Kau Pei Chau =

Uninhabited islet in Hong Kong

Native name: 狗髀洲
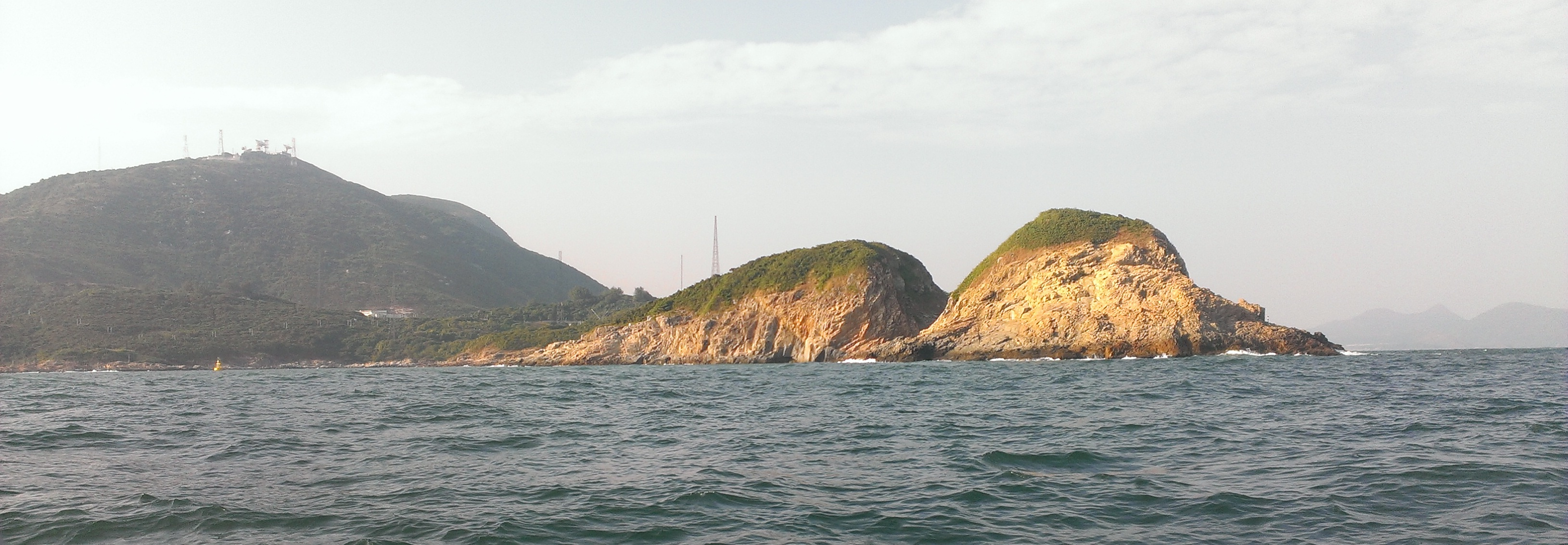

- Location within Hong Kong

Geography
- Coordinates: 22°12′00″N 114°15′00″E
- Length: 1,340 m (4400 ft)

Administration
- Hong Kong
- District: Southern

Demographics
- Population: 0

Kau Pei Chau
- Chinese: 狗髀洲
- Literal meaning: Dog Buttocks/Thigh Island
Transcriptions
Standard Mandarin
- Hanyu Pinyin: Gǒu Bì Zhōu
Yue: Cantonese
- Yale Romanization: Gáu béi jāu
- Jyutping: Gau2 bei2 zau1
- Sidney Lau: Gau^{2} Bei^{2} Jau^{1}

Kau Pei Chau is an uninhabited islet located off the coast of Hong Kong Island on its southeastern end, about 50 metres (165 feet) off the tip of Cape D'Aguilar. Administratively, it is part of Southern District. Kau Pei Chau has a length of 1.34 kilometres (0.83 mi). It is located directly south of the Cape D’Aguilar Marine Reserve.

== Name ==
Kau Pei (狗髀) literally means the thigh of a dog. Its original name in Chinese is Kau Pui (Chinese: 筊杯; Sidney Lau: Gaau^{2} Booi^{1}), which is a divination tool used in temples to request an answer from the gods in ancient China.

== See also ==
- List of islands and peninsulas of Hong Kong
- Cape D'Aguilar Marine Reserve
