= Cape D'Aguilar =

Cape on Hong Kong Island, Hong Kong

Coordinates: 22°12′28″N 114°15′38″E

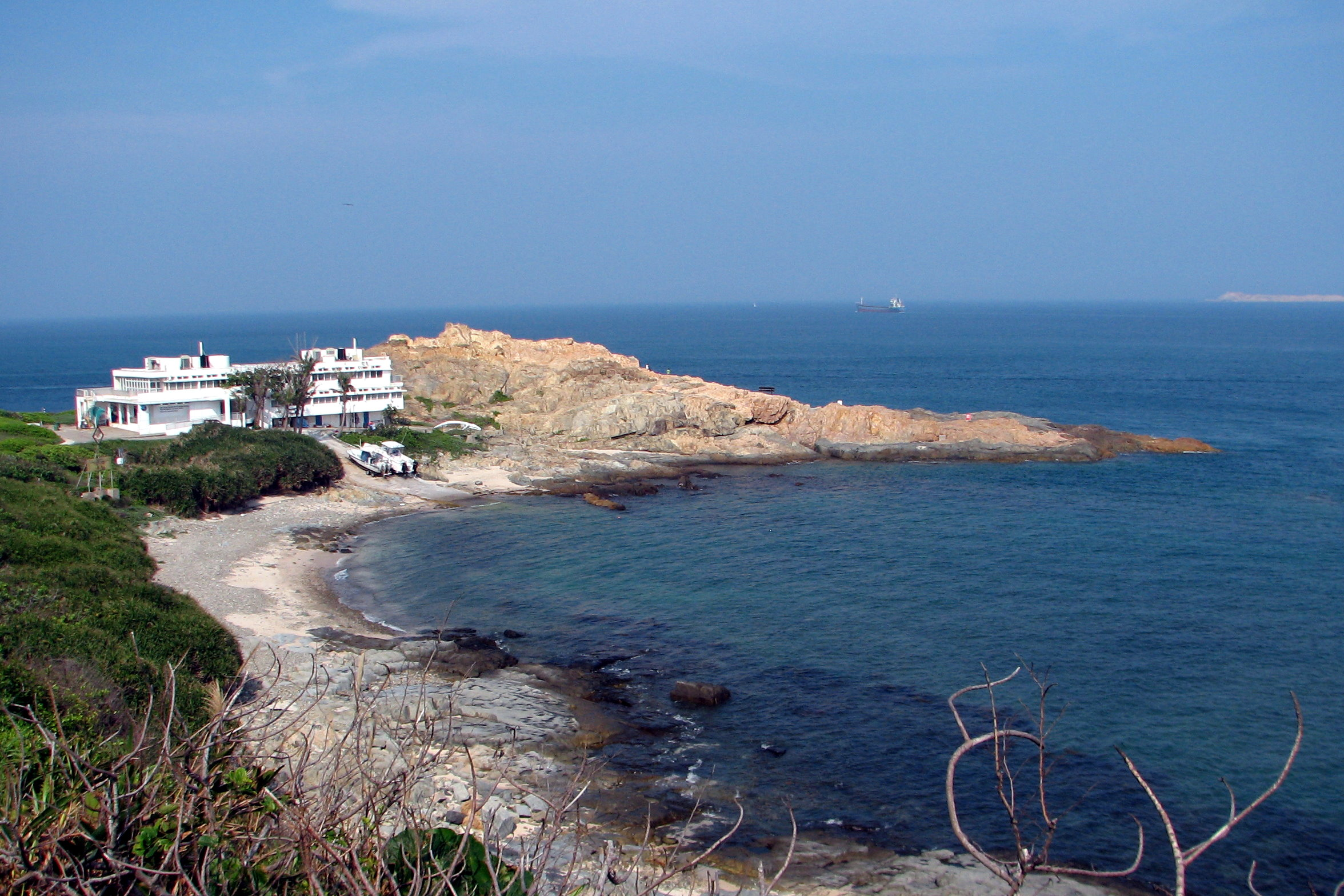
- Cape D'Aguilar
- Traditional Chinese: 鶴咀
- Simplified Chinese: 鹤咀
- Literal meaning: Crane Beak
Transcriptions
Standard Mandarin
- Hanyu Pinyin: Hèzuǐ
- Wade–Giles: Ho^{4}-tsui^{3}
- IPA: [xɤ̂.tswèɪ]
Yue: Cantonese
- Yale Romanization: Hohkjéui
- Jyutping: Hok6 Zeoi2
- IPA: [hɔk̚˨.tsɵɥ˧˥]

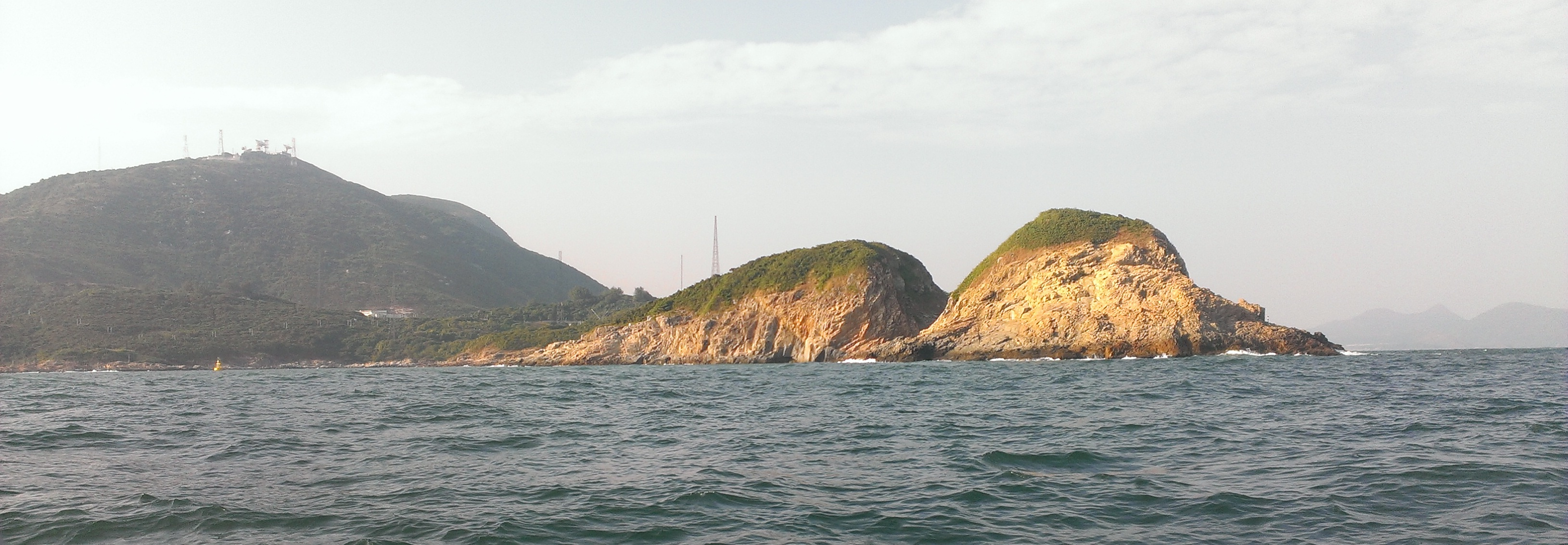
Kau Pei Chau

Cape D'Aguilar (Chinese: 鶴咀) is a cape on Hong Kong Island, Hong Kong. The cape is on the southeastern end of D'Aguilar Peninsula. To its north are Shek O and D'Aguilar Peak.

== Name ==
It is named after Major-General George Charles d'Aguilar.

== History ==
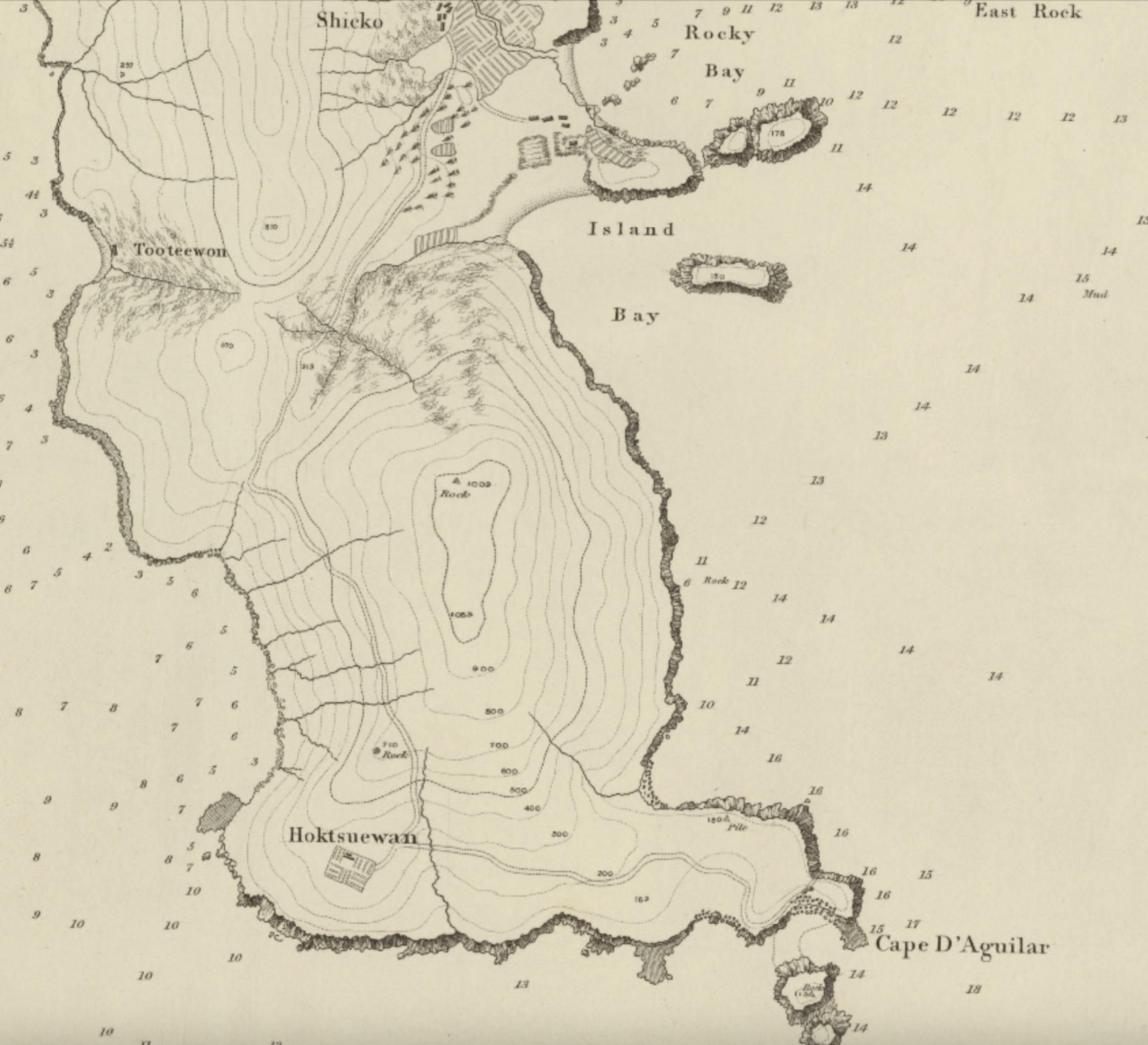
Cape D'Aguilar as surveyed in 1845.

The name Cape D'Aguilar appeared first on a map in 1845 surveyed by Lieutenant Collinson and Sir John Francis Davis. (see image) The Chinese name likely originated from the nearby village Hoktsuewan (鶴嘴灣) Around the same time and before, Cape D'Aguilar was also regularly named Tylong Head in maps, a direct translation of the Chinese 大浪頭 [lit. Big Wave Head].

== Geography ==
Cape D'Aguilar is in the Southern District. Nearby, there are two small islands collectively called Kau Pei Chau (狗髀洲). A channel called Sheung Sze Mun (雙四門) is located close to the cape.

Cape D'Aguilar Road is the only road for access. The Hong Kong Government Gazette confirmed the name on April 12, 1935:

Road branching off Shek O Road at Windy Gap and terminating at Cape D'Aguilar Wireless Station ... Cape D'Aguilar Road 鶴 嘴 道

— No. 302, Hong Kong Government Gazette, 28 September 1935,

== Marine Reserve ==
Cape D'Aguilar is environmentally protected as part of the Cape D'Aguilar Marine Reserve.

== Sightseeing ==
Common sights for visitors include the Bones of Miss Willy, a whale's skeleton display mounted in front of the University of Hong Kong's Swire Institute of Marine Science.

The Crab's Eye is a sea cave off the Cape D'Aguilar Road, connected to the Thunder Cave. It is also a popular sightseeing point for tourists.

Another popular sightseeing point is the Bokhara Battery, the remains of an artillery battery that was used during the Battle of Hong Kong.

== See also ==
- Cape D'Aguilar Lighthouse
- Green Island Lighthouse Compound
- Waglan Lighthouse
- Tang Lung Chau Lighthouse
