= Aberdeen Baptist Lui Ming Choi College =

Secondary school in Hong Kong

Aberdeen Baptist Lui Ming Choi College 香港仔浸信會呂明才書院

Location
- 18 Lei Tung Estate Road, Ap Lei Chau
- Coordinates: 22.2422°N 114.1556°E

Information
- Motto: AGATHOS & ALETHEIA; Be true and kind
- Religious affiliation: Christian
- Established: 1974; 52 years ago
- School district: Hong Kong Island
- Principal: Ms. Yeung Mei Lun
- Teaching staff: About 50
- Enrollment: Approximately 950
- Houses: House of Calvin; House of Luther; House of Moody; House of Spurgeon
- Colours: Blue and White
- Affiliation: Aberdeen Baptist Church
- Campus area: ~10000m^{2}
- Website: www.ablmcc.edu.hk

Aberdeen Baptist Lui Ming Choi College
- Traditional Chinese: 香港仔浸信會呂明才書院
- Simplified Chinese: 香港仔浸信会吕明才书院
Transcriptions
Standard Mandarin
- Hanyu Pinyin: Xiānggǎngzǎi Jìnxìnhuì Lǚ Míngcái Shūyuàn
Yue: Cantonese
- Jyutping: hoeng1 gong2 zai2 zam3 seon3 wui6*2 leoi5 ming4 zi2 syu1 jyun6*2

ABLMCC
- Chinese: 浸中
Transcriptions
Standard Mandarin
- Hanyu Pinyin: Jìn Zhōng
Yue: Cantonese
- Jyutping: zam3 zung1

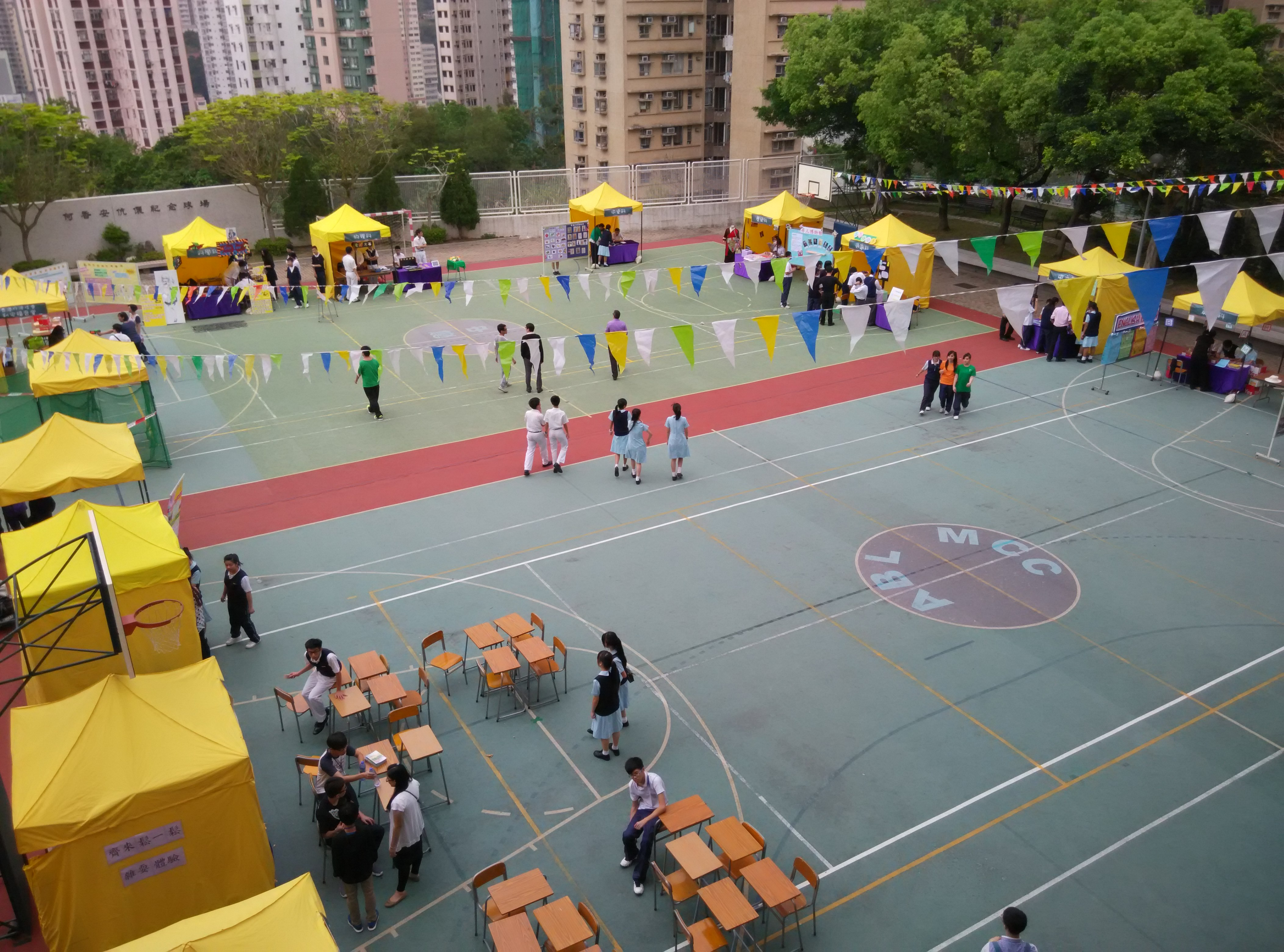
The East Playground

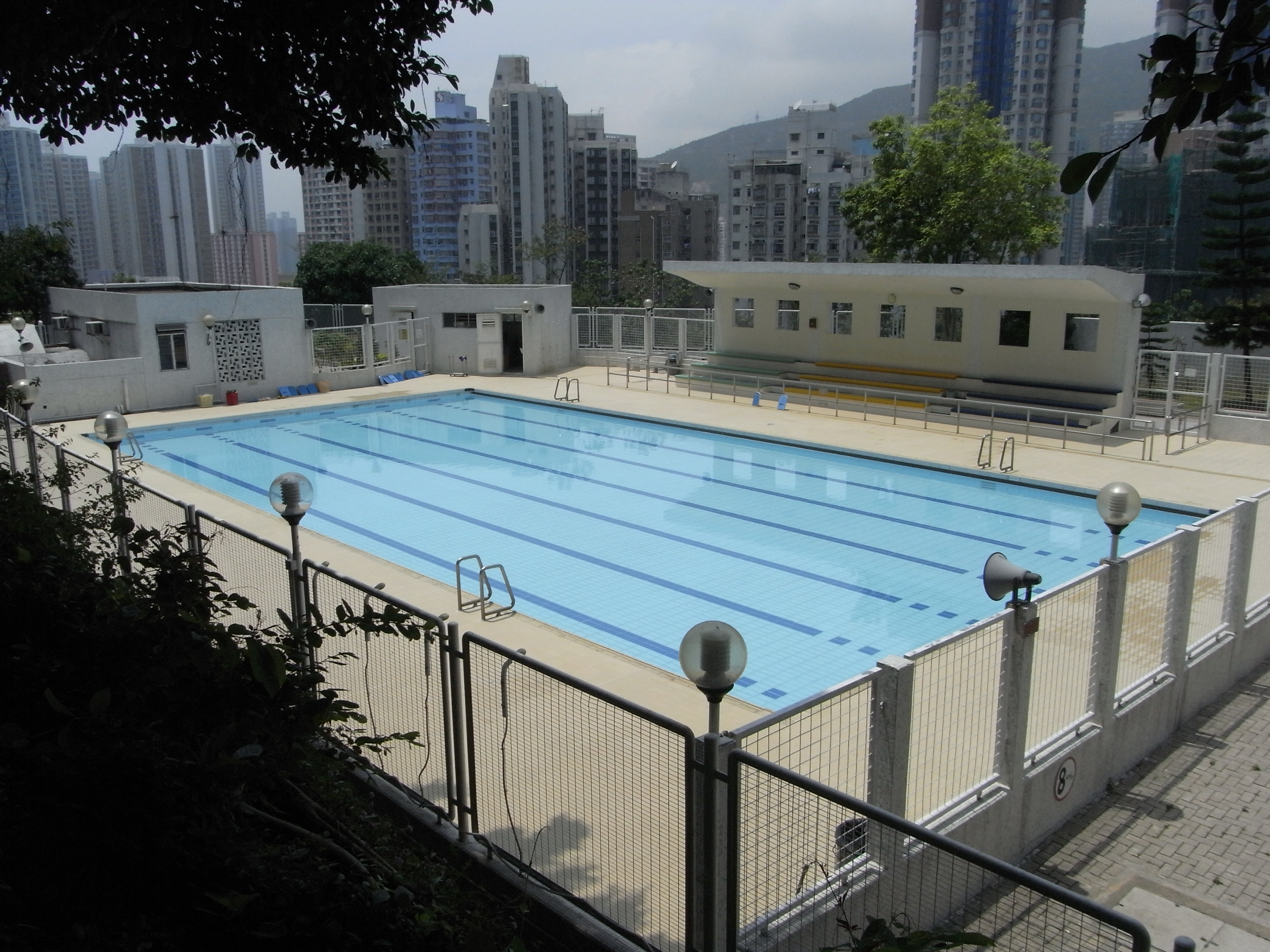
Swimming Pool

Aberdeen Baptist Lui Ming Choi College (abbreviated as ABLMCC, Chinese: 香港仔浸信會呂明才書院 or abbreviated as 浸中) is a Baptist co-educational government aided secondary school in Ap Lei Chau, Southern District, Hong Kong near Lei Tung station.

== History ==
1974–1978: Pui Chun Secondary School (培真中學)
1978–1987: Aberdeen Baptist Secondary School (香港仔浸信會書院)
1987–present: Aberdeen Baptist Lui Ming Choi College (香港仔浸信會呂明才書院)

== House system ==
There are four Houses in Aberdeen Baptist Lui Ming Choi College:

- House of Calvin (Blue)
- House of Luther (Yellow)
- House of Moody (Red)
- House of Spurgeon (Purple)
- House of Schweitzer (Cancelled in 90s.)
- House of Wesley (Cancelled in 90s.)
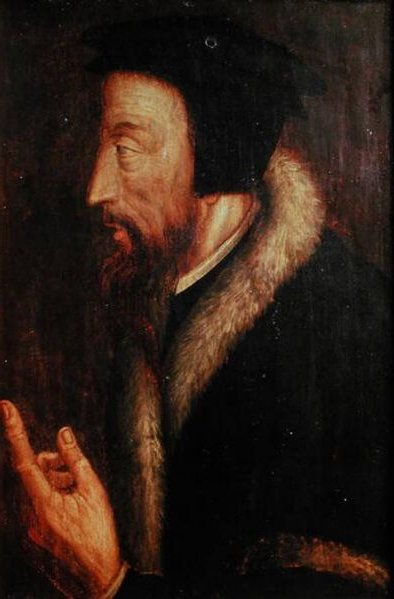
John Calvin (Calvin House)。

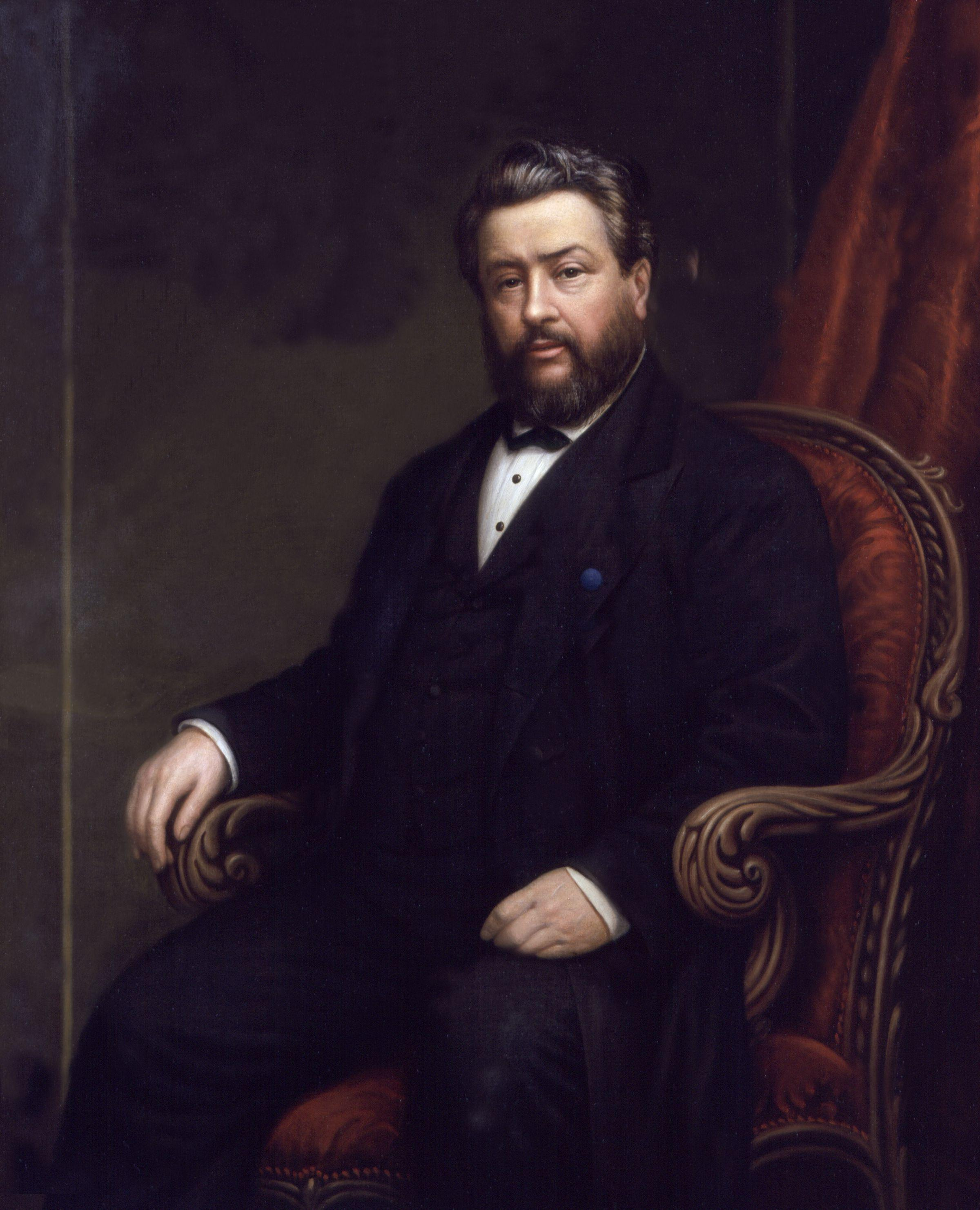
Charles Haddon Spurgeon(Spurgeon House)。

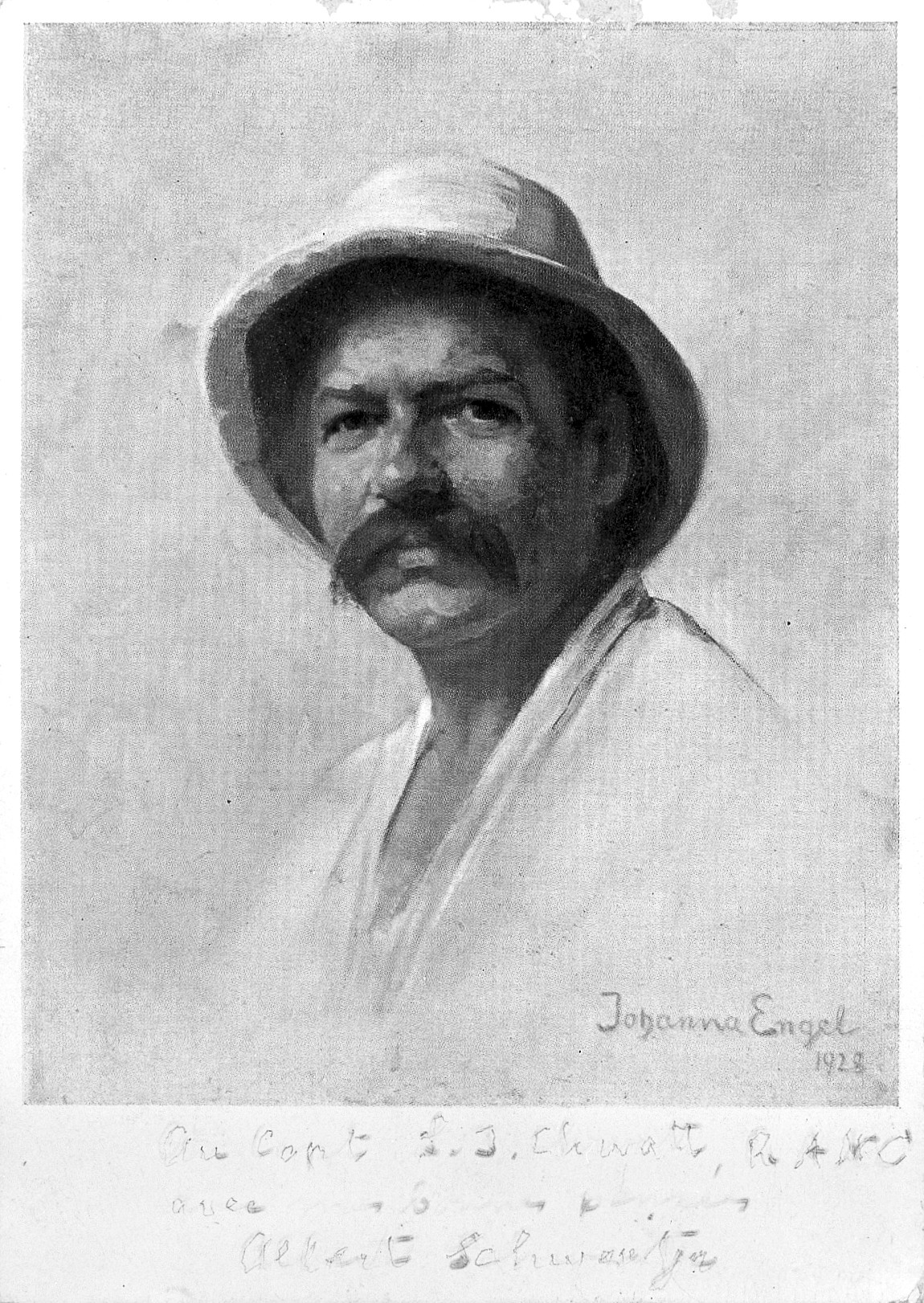
A. Schweitzer (Schweitzer House)。

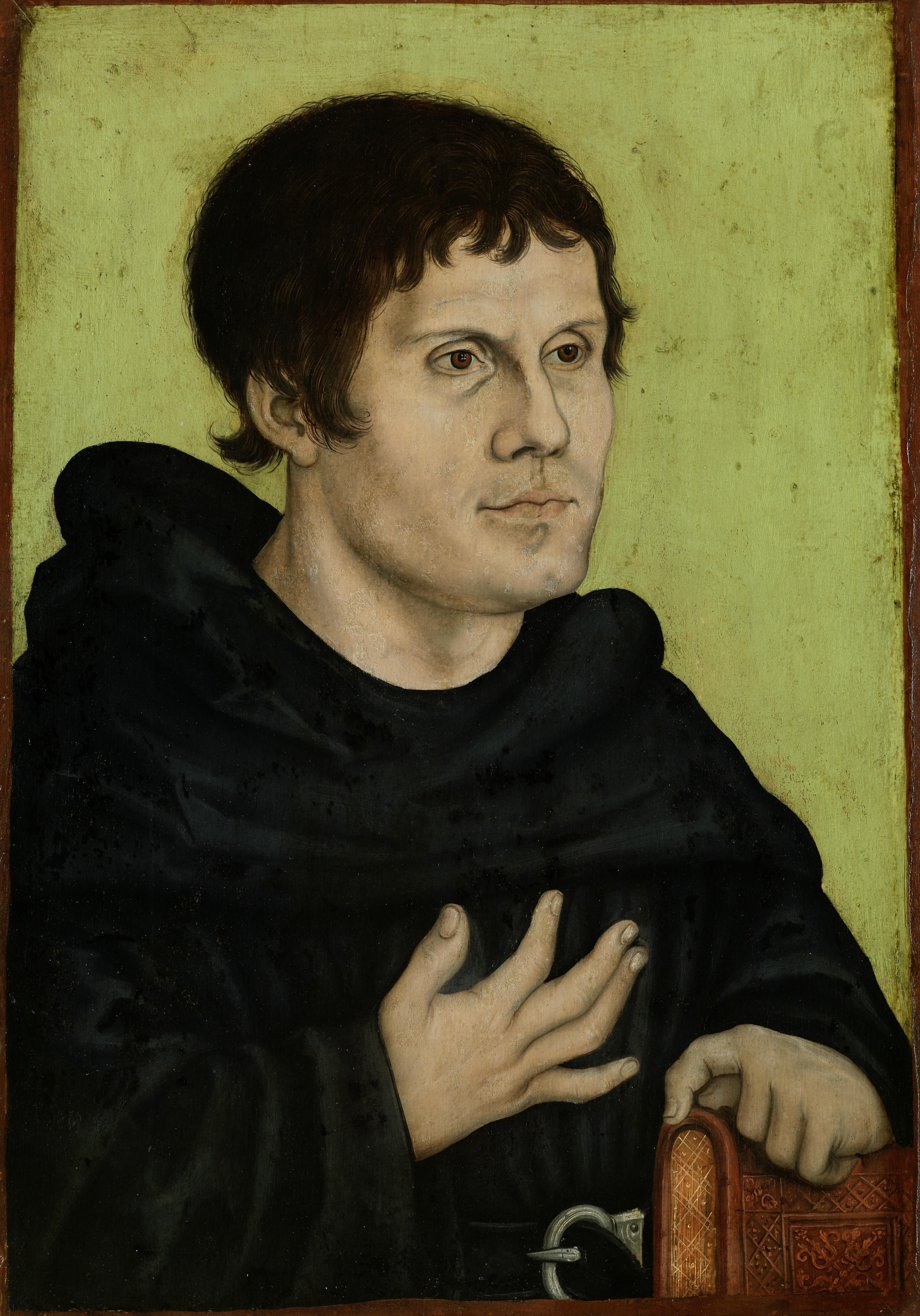
Martin Luther (Luther House)。

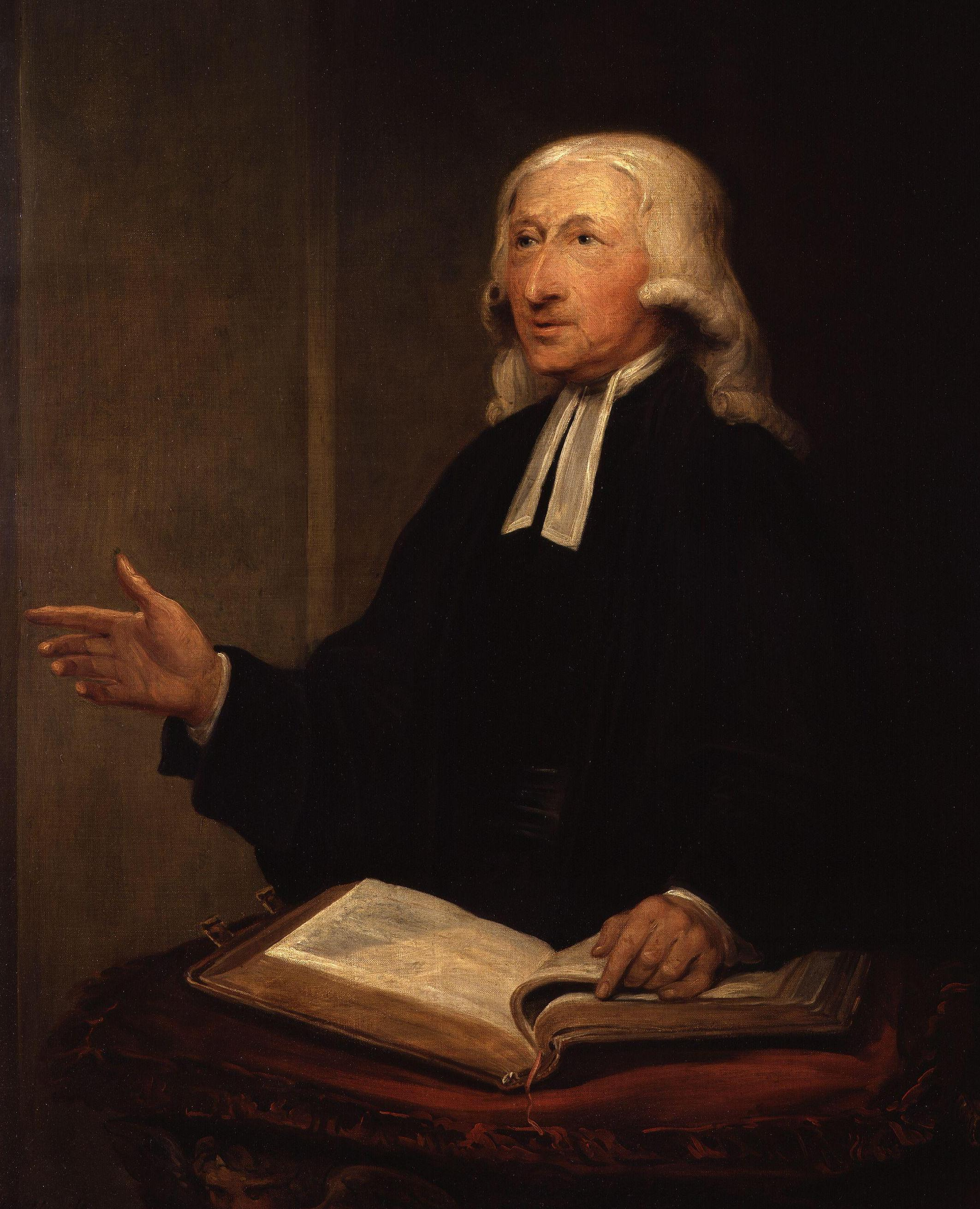
John Wesley (Wesley House)。

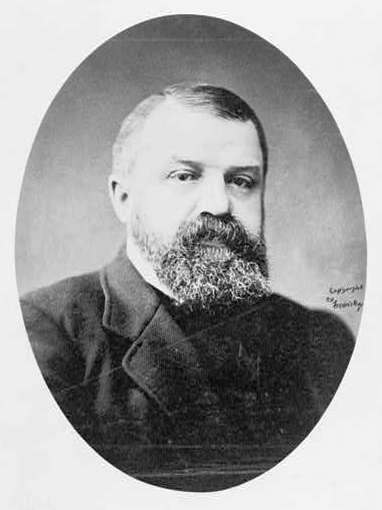
Lyman Moody (Moody House)。

== Notable staff ==
- Lee Wing Kei, a football commentator at Now TV (Hong Kong)

== Notable alumni ==
- Grace Ip Pui Man, a Hong Kong singer
- Chan King Yin, a Hong Kong windsurfer
