= History of the South Island line and West Island line =

The history of the South Island line and West Island line encompasses a number of proposals which were made for extending the Hong Kong MTR metro system to the south and west of Hong Kong Island, which were not serviced by any rail transport before 2014. The West Island line opened as an extension of the Island line on 28 December 2014. The South Island line has completed construction and commenced service on 28 December 2016. In 2025, the Government gave approval for detailed planning work to begin for the South Island line (West). Construction is targeted to begin in 2027, with completion targeted for 2034.

Timeline of South Island line and West Island line
Date	Event
1960	Stations of West Island line were proposed as part of Island line project
1980	West Island line stations were deferred due to ageing population of Western District and debts of MTRC
2000	West Island line was proposed in Railway Development Strategy
2002	MTRC submitted its first proposal to government for the South Island line and West Island line
2003	Executive Council modified to the South Island line plans, and took into account the parallel development of Route 4 highway
Mid- to Late-2003	MTRC began feasibility study to look for cost effective options. A modified proposal was submitted in November with three options of alignment in the South Island line
2004	MTRC submit a revised alignment scheme: Western part of South Island became Island Extension
Mid-2004	Legislative Council debate whether to build highway or South Island line. Government later announced to defer both rail line because of low ridership of the previous project West Rail line and its rail incidents
2005	MTRC submitted a revised scheme to Legislative Council. South Island line was separated into East and West section.
2007	Government officials confirmed the South Island line (East) would be one of the priority. Chief executive later announced to build in 2011, and open in 2015. Executive Council approved final scheme of South Island
2009	Executive Council approved final scheme of West Island line
2011	A resident filed suit against the government
2014	Commencement of West Island line South Island line (West) was readdressed on the Railway Development Strategy 2014, divided into two sections Apple Daily revealed commencement date of South Island line would be postponed by 1.5 years, MTRC confirmed
2016	Commencement of South Island line

== 1960s to 1980s ==
Consultant Freeman, Fox, Wilbur Smith & Associates, has been hired by Hong Kong government, studied possibilities of mass transport in Hong Kong. In September 1967, they proposed a mass transit railway network, which included the Island line from Kennedy Town to Chai Wan. In 1980, only the Sheung Wan to Chai Wan section was approved due to debt of MTRC and ageing population of Western District. Yet, some of the ground-level-units within private buildings are reserved by government through public easement, in order to preserve for railway station entrances.

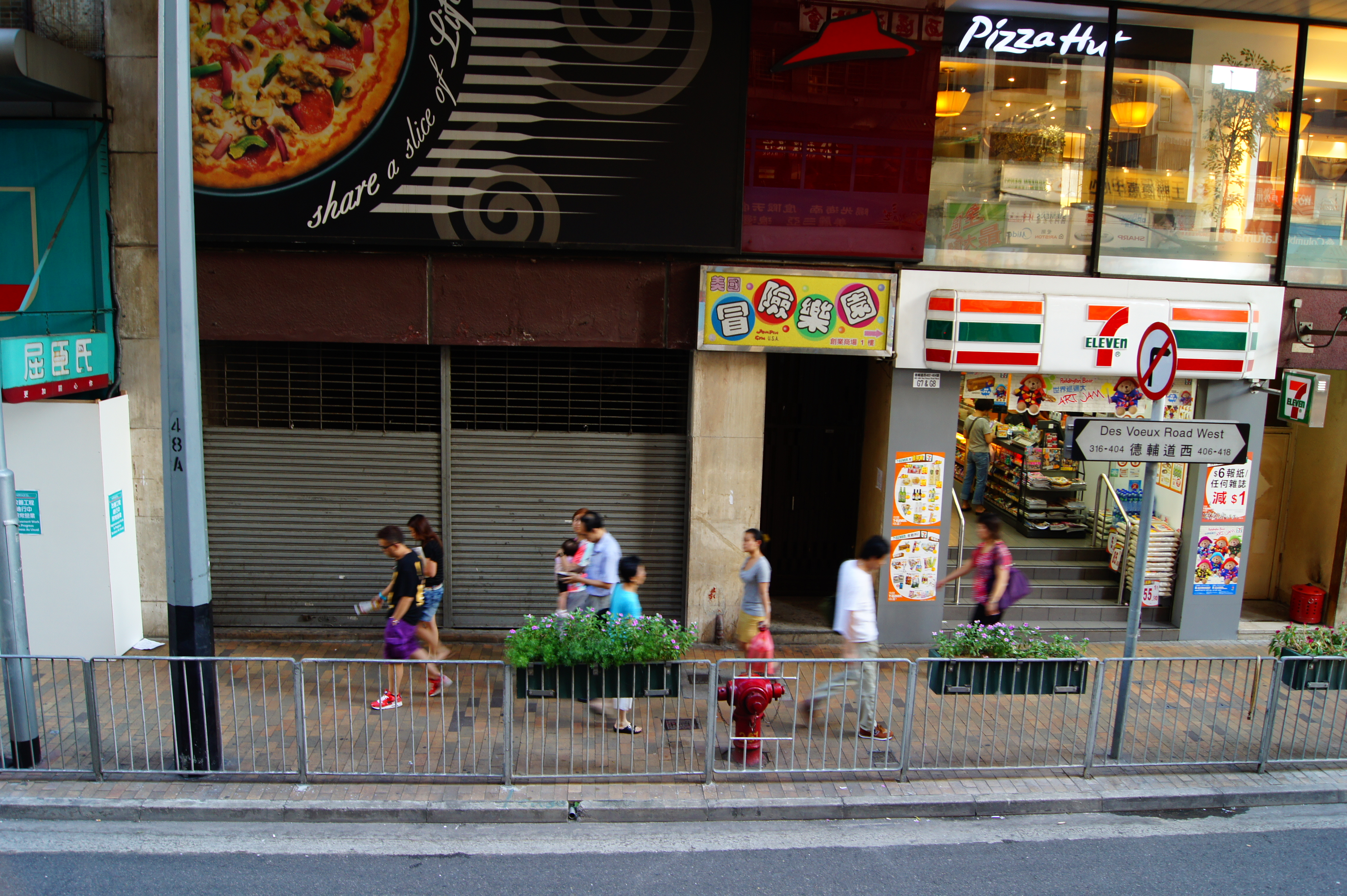
Reserved space at Chong Yip Shopping Centre

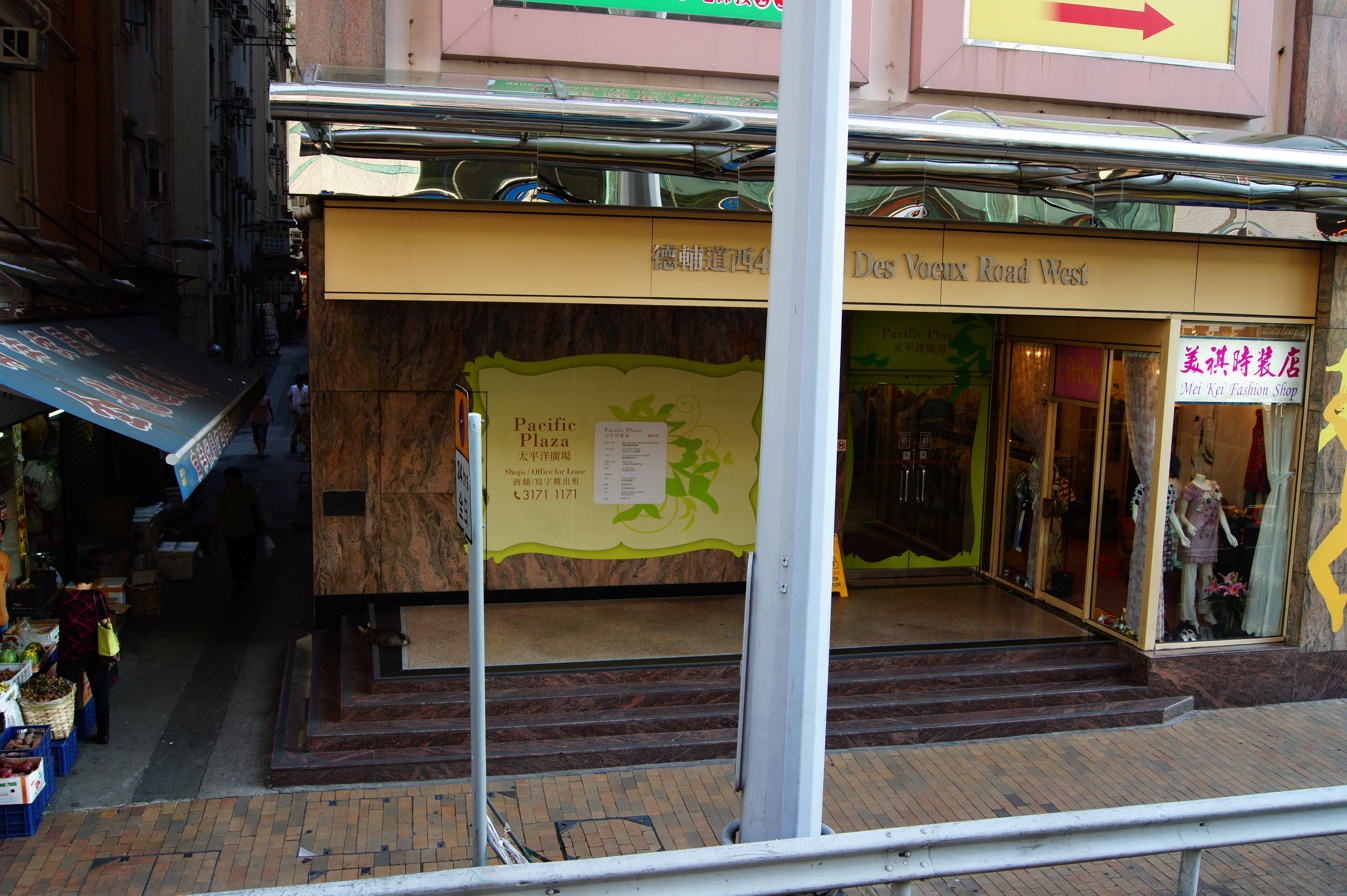
Reserved space at Pacific Plaza

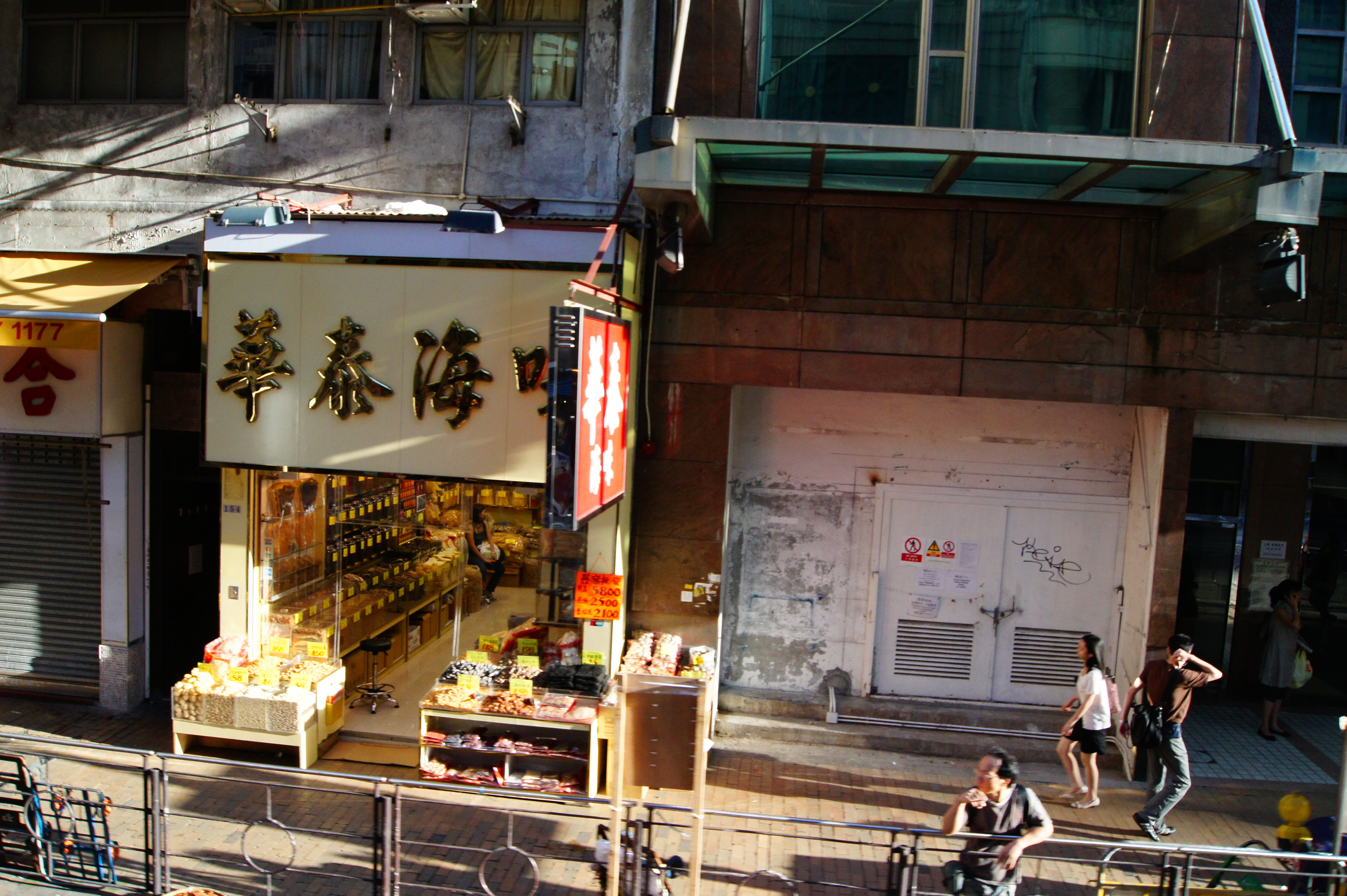
Reserved space at Eco Tree Hotel

== Early 2000 ==
The West Island line was first proposed in the Railway Development Strategy 2000 by the Transport Bureau, aiming to connect the Tseung Kwan O line to part of the Island line to create a new railway corridor.

== 2002 proposal ==
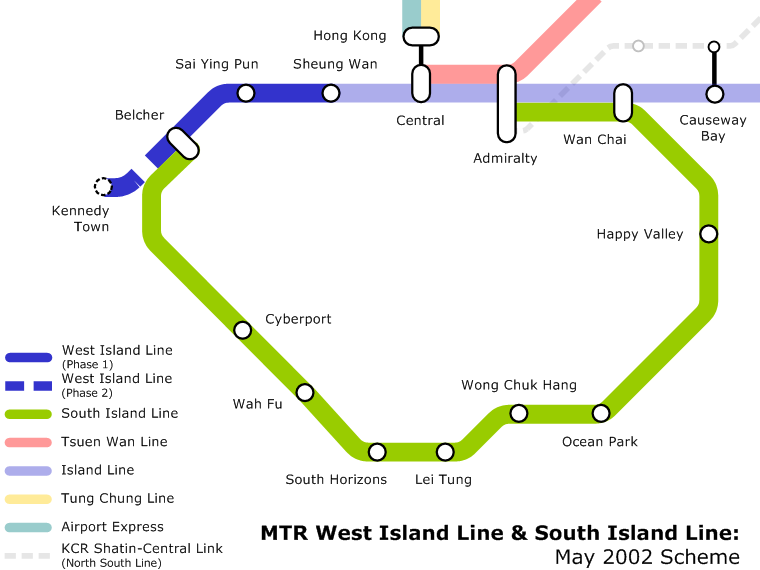
Alignment of 2002 Original Scheme

The MTR Corporation Limited (MTRC) submitted its first proposal for the South Island line and West Island line in May 2002. The new lines were intended to promote tourism in Aberdeen. The West Island line would be an extension of the Island line.

In the proposal, the South Island line would be a semicircular line with nine stations, intended to serve the southern end of Hong Kong Island towards Aberdeen. It would interchange with the Island line at University and Wan Chai, which would also be its terminus stations. The stations in between would be, from University, Cyberport, Wah Fu, South Horizons, Lei Tung, Wong Chuk Hang, Ocean Park and Happy Valley.

The West Island line would be an extension of the Island line. Construction of the new West Island line would be divided into two phases. Phase one would begin at the already existing Sheung Wan station. A further two stations, Sai Ying Pun and University (near The University of Hong Kong) would be added to extend the length of the Island line. University would also serve as an interchange for the South Island line. Phase two would include an extension to Kennedy Town. The construction of phase two, which will include a depot near Kennedy Town station, is subject to the land availability of the western reclamation.

On 21 January 2003, the Executive Council of Hong Kong made modifications to the South Island line plans, to achieve a more cost-effective option and taking into account the parallel development of Route 4. However, the first proposal had some major drawbacks. Specifically, construction of West Island line as heavy rail would not include Kennedy Town if there was no Western reclamation. There would also be environmental and traffic management challenges if the West Island line went under Des Voeux Road West. There would not be an Aberdeen station for serving the Aberdeen area, and a transfer station at Wan Chai would not cater well for the needs of cross-harbour trips (passengers would have to change to Island line trains for Admiralty and then change for cross-harbour trips on the Tsuen Wan line).

The Executive Council gave MTRC permission to proceed with further planning on Phase 1 of West Island line. However, the first proposal had some major drawbacks. Specifically, construction of West Island line as heavy railway type tunnels and stations would not include Kennedy Town if there is no Western reclamation. There would also be great environmental impact and traffic management challenge if West Island line goes under Des Voeux Road West.

== 2003 proposal ==
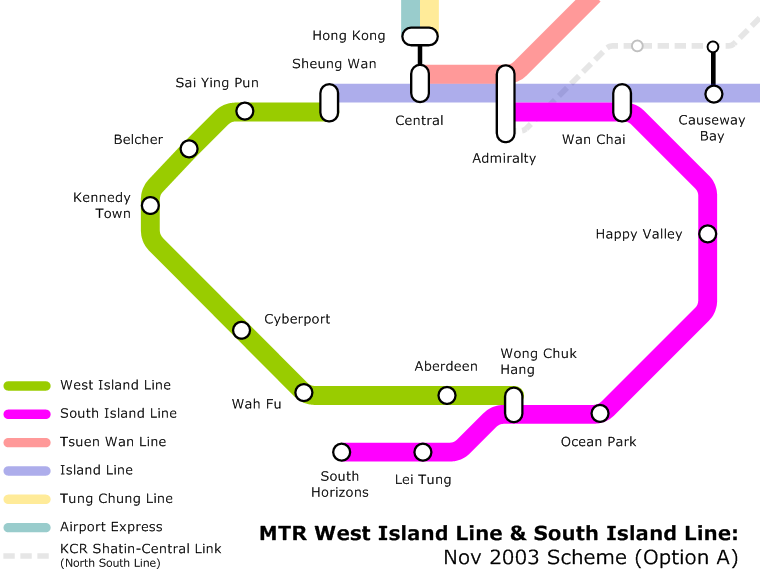
Alignment of 2003 Preliminary Scheme. Notice that Option A of South Island line serves the most.

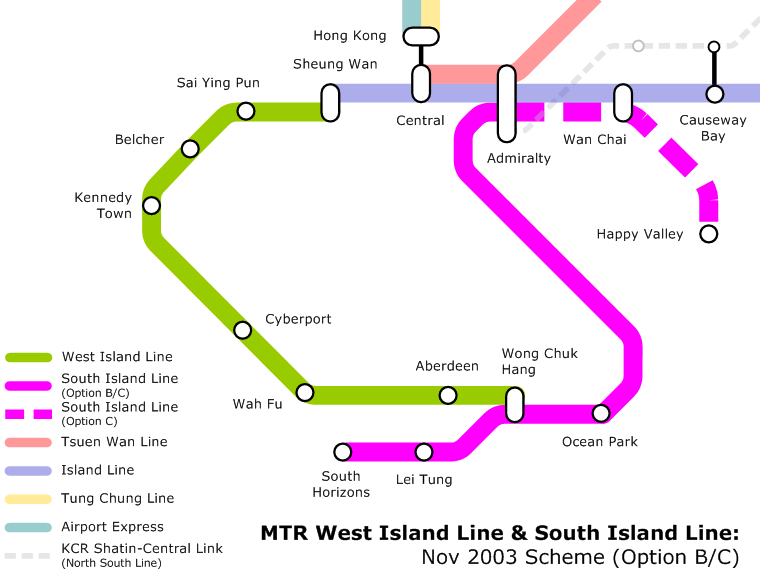
Alignment of 2003 Preliminary Scheme. Option B is the most direct route from Southern District.

To respond to the criticism directed towards the original proposal, the MTRC started a feasibility study of the lines in mid-2003 to look for cost effective options to improve the system. The study also evaluated the external benefits of the project and its impact on other modes of public transport. The company derived a modified proposal in November 2003, with three options of alignment in the South Island line part, to address the drawbacks in the initial scheme.

The western section of the South Island line was transferred to the West Island line, now a medium-capacity rail line from Sheung Wan to Wong Chuk Hang interchanging with the Island line at Sheung Wan. The South Island line would also be a medium-capacity system.

=== South Island line ===
- South Horizons
- Lei Tung
- Wong Chuk Hang (Interchange to West Island line)
- Ocean Park
- Happy Valley (Option C)
- Wan Chai (Interchange to Island line)
- Admiralty (Interchange to Tsuen Wan line & Island line)

=== West Island line ===
- Sheung Wan (Interchange to Island line)
- Sai Ying Pun
- University
- Cyberport
- Wah Fu
- Aberdeen
- Wong Chuk Hang (Interchange to South Island line)

== 2004 proposal ==
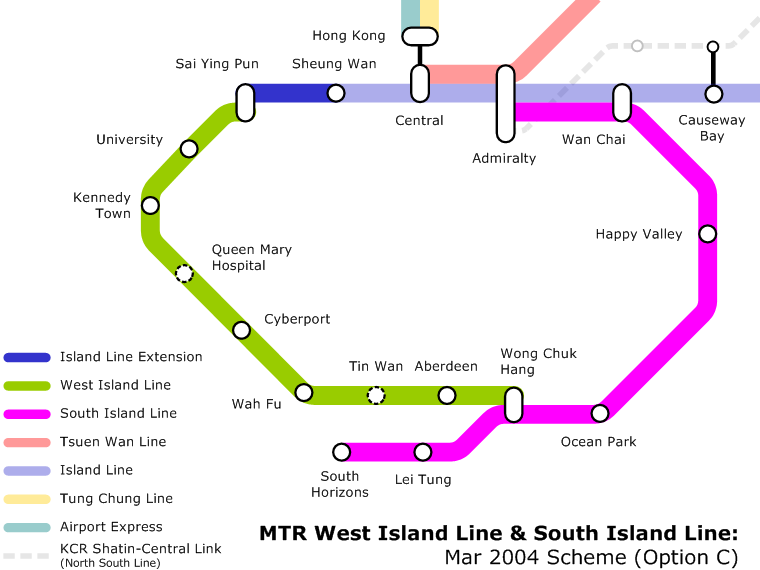
Alignment of 2004 Revised Alignment Scheme. This is by far the most publicised scheme. '''Option C''' serves the most but also costs the most.

The corporation handed in the Revised Alignment Scheme in March 2004. South Island line runs from South Horizons to Admiralty in the scheme, still having three alignment options. West Island line in the previous proposal was separated into two parts: the northern part of which became an extension to Island line, and the southern part which remained a line of its own.

A short extension from Sheung Wan to Sai Ying Pun, in which the latter station provides a transfer to the West Island line.

=== South Island line ===
- South Horizons
- Lei Tung
- Wong Chuk Hang (Interchange to West Island line)
- Ocean Park
- Happy Valley (Option B, C)
- Wan Chai (Interchange to Island line) (Option C)
- Admiralty (Interchange to Tsuen Wan line & Island line) (Option A, B, C)

=== West Island line ===
- Sai Ying Pun (Interchange to Island line)
- HKU
- Kennedy Town
- Queen Mary Hospital (Future Stop)
- Cyberport
- Wah Fu
- Tin Wan (Future Stop)
- Aberdeen
- Wong Chuk Hang (Interchange to South Island line)

== Deferral of the scheme ==
On 28 May 2004, the Panel of Transport of Legislative Council held a meeting to consider the development of West and South Island lines along with the highway link (Route 4).

Residential, environmental and some professional organisations support building the lines instead of highway. Rail links are more environmentally friendly and will help ease congestion of the Aberdeen Tunnel. The lines can also help sustainable development and will preserve the shoreline along western and southern Hong Kong Island.

Other transport operators and various organisations opposed the rail link, claiming that the rail link could lead to severe competition between different modes of transport, and that reduction of road transport might eventually cause job losses. Some panel members stated that the projected population growth in the south cannot support the new lines, and that the government should have a thorough plan on how to develop the Southern District before implementing the rail links.

However, some panel members suggested that the new lines could help promote tourism in the area. They asked the government to moderate the various modes of transport upon the new lines' inaugurations so as to relieve concerns from the transport operators.

Government officials stated that the low ridership of the West Rail line and its rail incidents warranted extra planning on the new rail lines to ensure enough ridership and appropriate, cost-effective system design. Therefore, the West Island line and South Island line project was deferred, and approval was given to the detailed planning of the highway.

== 2005 proposal ==
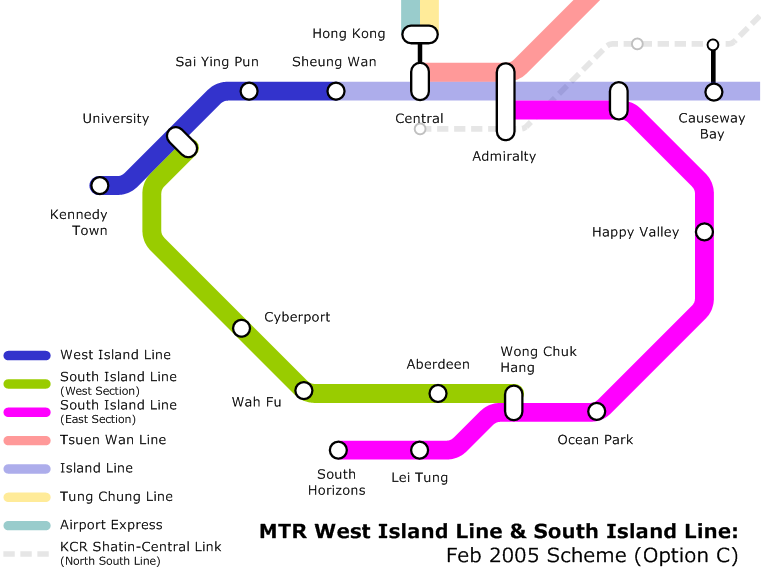
Alignment of the 2005 scheme.

On 25 February 2005, the Panel of Transport of Legislative Council had a meeting discussing West and South Island line. MTR has submitted a revised scheme on 22 February and an introduction to the scheme was conducted in the meeting.

The three alignment options of South Island line were:

- Option A: Ocean Park – Happy Valley – Wan Chai – Admiralty
  This alignment is the most expensive, but has the greatest catchment.
- Option B: Ocean Park – Admiralty (no intermediate station)
  Reduces travel times from Southern District to CBD. Least expensive option.
- Option C: Ocean Park – Admiralty (with possible extension to Wan Chai and Happy Valley)
  Similar to option B, but enables further extension to Happy Valley in the future.

=== South Island line (West) ===
It was separated from the West Island line in the last proposal, running from University to Wong Chuk Hang:

- University (Interchange to West Island line)
- Cyberport
- Wah Fu
- Aberdeen
- Wong Chuk Hang (Interchange to South Island line (E))

=== South Island line (East) ===
It runs on the same alignment of South Island line in Revised Scheme, and the three options stated before still exist. The line starts at South Horizons:

- South Horizons
- Lei Tung
- Wong Chuk Hang (Interchange to South Island line (W))
- Ocean Park
- Happy Valley (Option B, C)
- Wan Chai (Option B only)
- Admiralty (Option A, B, C)

=== West Island line ===
In the scheme, West Island line included only the extension to Island Line. The rest became the west section of South Island line. The new West Island line would run from Sheung Wan to Kennedy Town:

- Sheung Wan
- Sai Ying Pun
- HKU (Interchange to South Island line (West))
- Kennedy Town

=== Discussions on the 2005 new plan ===
The MTR claimed that the latest scheme had the following advantages:

1. No reclamation needed, and it alleviates air and noise pollution
2. Supporting tourism in Southern District: as Wong Chuk Hang will soon have nine new hotels and Ocean Park will be redeveloped

The officials from Environment, Transport and Works Bureau said that consideration of funding depends on the development of tourism in Southern District, especially after the submission of Ocean Park redevelopment project.

In February 2007, the government announced in a Southern District Council meeting that the South Island line was currently at a 4th priority when it came to future railway projects, much to the anger of the district councillors present. This implied that the South Island line was unlikely to be opened to the public before 2015.

On 10 October 2007, Chief executive Donald Tsang announced in the policy address that the South Island line would start construction in around 2011, and will be opened in 2015. On 27 October 2007, MTR announced that stations will be built in Wong Chuk Hang and around Ocean Park, but MTR did not confirm whether the line will pass through Wan Chai and Happy Valley.

== 2007 Executive Council scheme ==
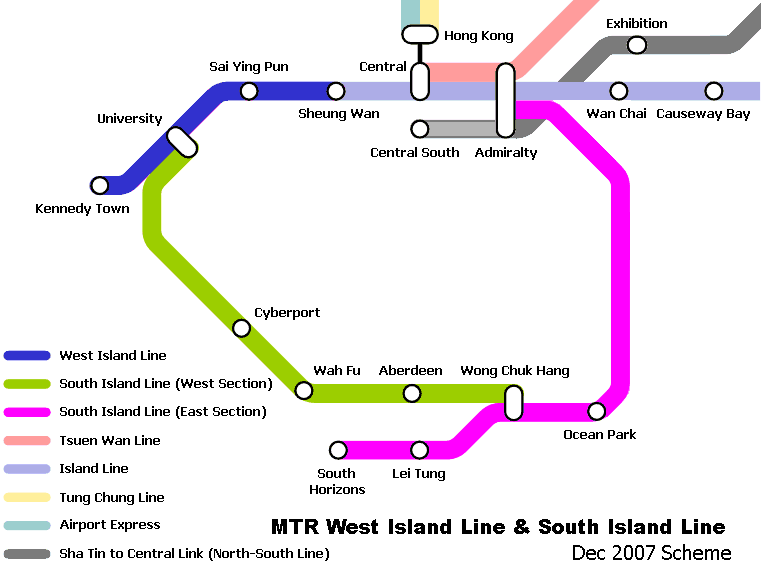
Alignment of the 2007 scheme. Wan Chai station and Happy Valley Station were omitted.

On 18 December 2007, the Executive Council of Hong Kong approved the construction of the east section of South Island line. A total of five stations will be built, not including Wan Chai and Happy Valley from the 2005 proposal. The railway will be seven kilometres long, and it will take 10 minutes to travel from South Horizons station to Admiralty station. The railway will be a medium-capacity system and cost HK$10 billion, which is 42% more than the original estimate of HK$7 billion of 2006.

The West Island line extension was given final authorisation in March 2009. Construction of the 3-kilometre extension started on 10 August 2009, for completion in 2014. The cost of the line is estimated to be HK$15.4 billion.

The construction of South Island line (West) has not been confirmed yet.

In June 2011 a resident of the South Horizons private residential estate at Ap Lei Chau filed suit against the government (including the chief executive, Transport Department, and Financial Services and the Treasury Bureau) in the High Court to block the construction of the South Island line. His suit alleged that the dust resulting from the construction of the line would cause harm to trees, and that the importation of large numbers of mainland and South Asian construction workers posed a threat to public safety.

== 2014 plan on South Island line (West) ==
South Island line (West) readdress on the Railway Development Strategy 2014. During consultation stage, consultant AECOM and MVA suggested to divide South Island line into two sections:

- Aberdeen Section: Wah Fu, Tin Wan, Aberdeen, Wong Chuk Hang
- Pokfulam Section: Hong Kong University(shortened as HKU), Queen Mary Hospital, Cyberport

They suggested that Aberdeen Section had higher traffic demand, as commuters would take a short alignment to Admiralty or CBD. Plus, Tin Wan was first taken into consideration and Queen Mary Hospital was re-proposal after 2004 scheme. Yet, this divided scheme was opposed by some of the Southern District Councillors, Cyberport commuters and residents. Some Southern District Councillors, like Lo Kin-hei and Henry Chai disagreed, especially after government has given MTRC topside development rights of Wong Chuk Hang Depot. The profit of topside housing is estimated to be fifty billion Hong Kong Dollars.

In the final report of Railway Development Strategy 2014, it confirmed the need of South Island line (West), but it did not determine whether to build the whole line or not. The estimated cost is twenty-five billion dollars in 2013 price.

On 20 December 2025, the Government granted approval for the MTR to proceed with detailed planning and design work for the South Island Line (West).

== Construction ==
=== South Island line (East) Construction and Deferral of opening ===
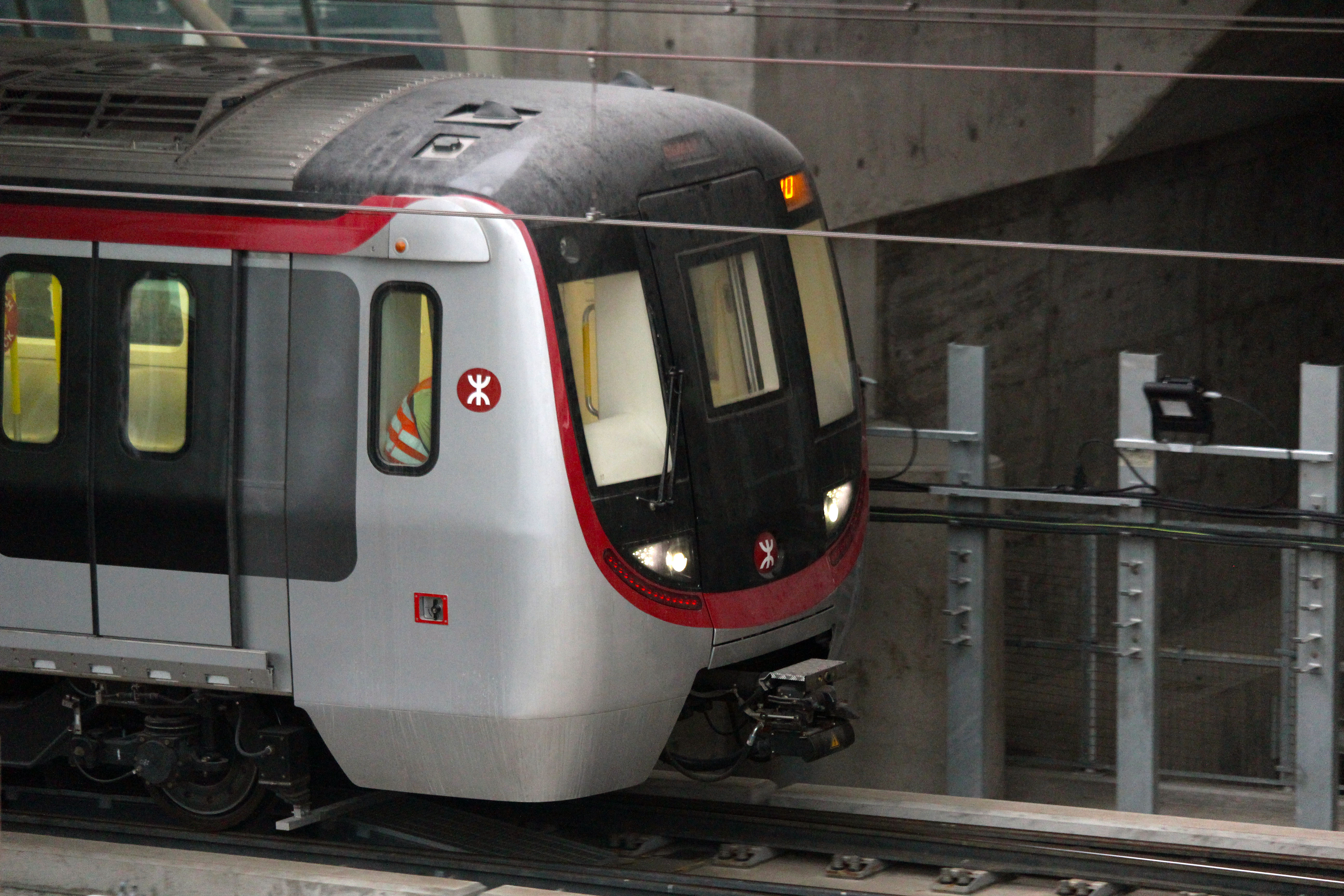
A test train approaching Wong Chuk Hang in December 2015

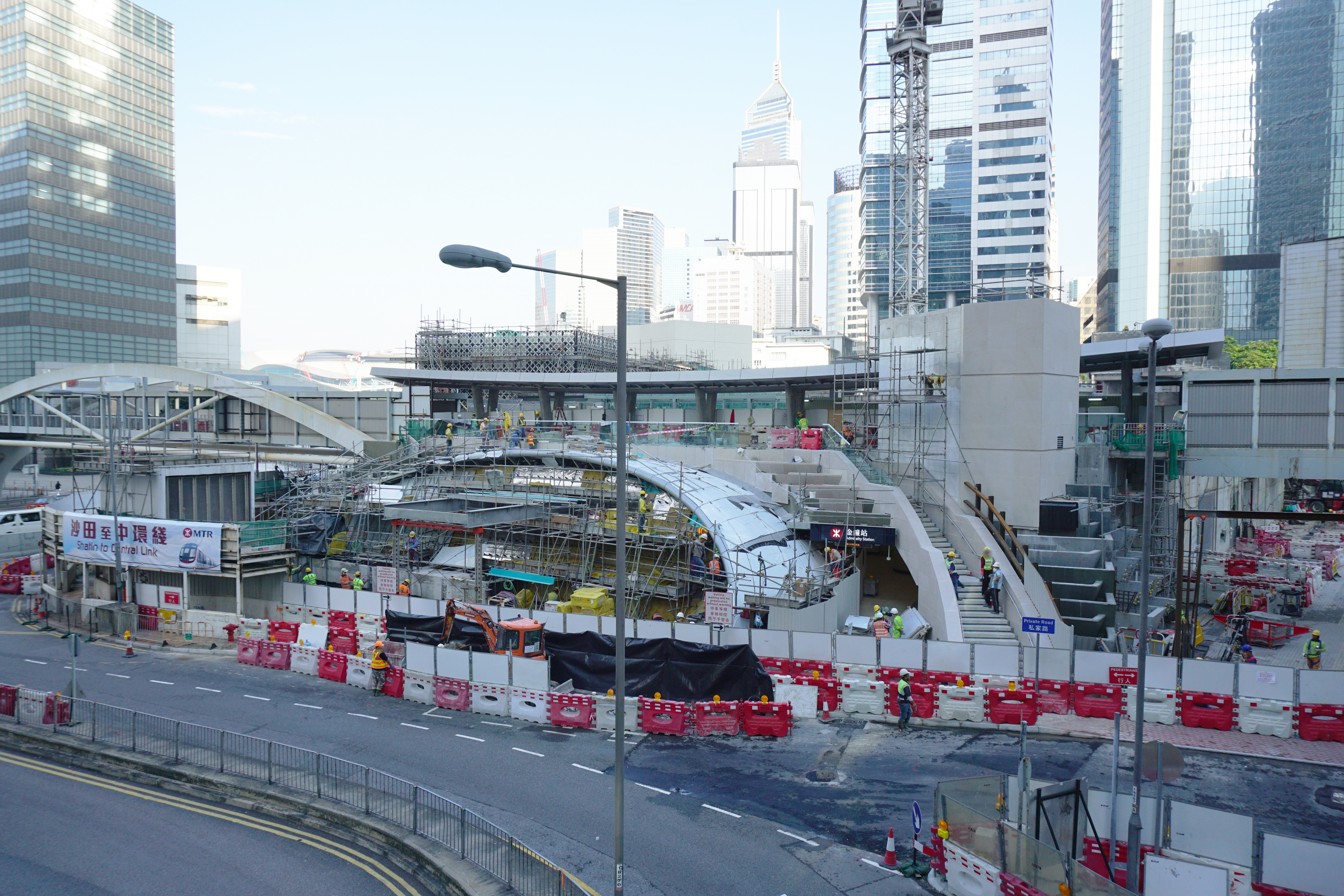
New concourse and platforms of South Island line at Admiralty

Project Agreements and Entrustment Agreement for MTR South Island line and the Kwun Tong line extension were signed by the Hong Kong government and MTR Corporation on 18 May 2011. South Island line (East) would be constructed in accordance to 2007 scheme.

The opening of the South Island line was originally planned for 2015. On 21 May 2014, an informant told Apple Daily that the commencement date of the line would be postponed by one and a half years. MTR Corporation asserted it would be opened as expected. Yet, the Transport and Housing Bureau revealed the delay of construction work and demanded MTR to review the commencement. Members of the Legislative Council and District Council criticised MTR for hiding the project's progress from the public and demanded a progress report at the Council's meeting. Eight days later at the South District Council meeting, MTRC announced the delay was caused by the expansion work of Admiralty station. High-density building, underground public facilities and the existing Admiralty station would prolong the work progress, as "safety comes first". However, the claimed 2015 opening date remained unchanged. In November 2014, a revised opening date of December 2016 was announced.

In October 2016, MTRC chairman Frederick Ma warned that the opening of the South Island line could be delayed by three more months. However, on 10 November 2016, he announced the South Island line would open by the end of 2016, saying the engineering team overcame the many challenges in expanding Admiralty station. Finally, MTRC chief executive Lincoln Leong officially declared the South Island line would begin operation on 28 December 2016.

=== West Island line construction and deferral of opening ===
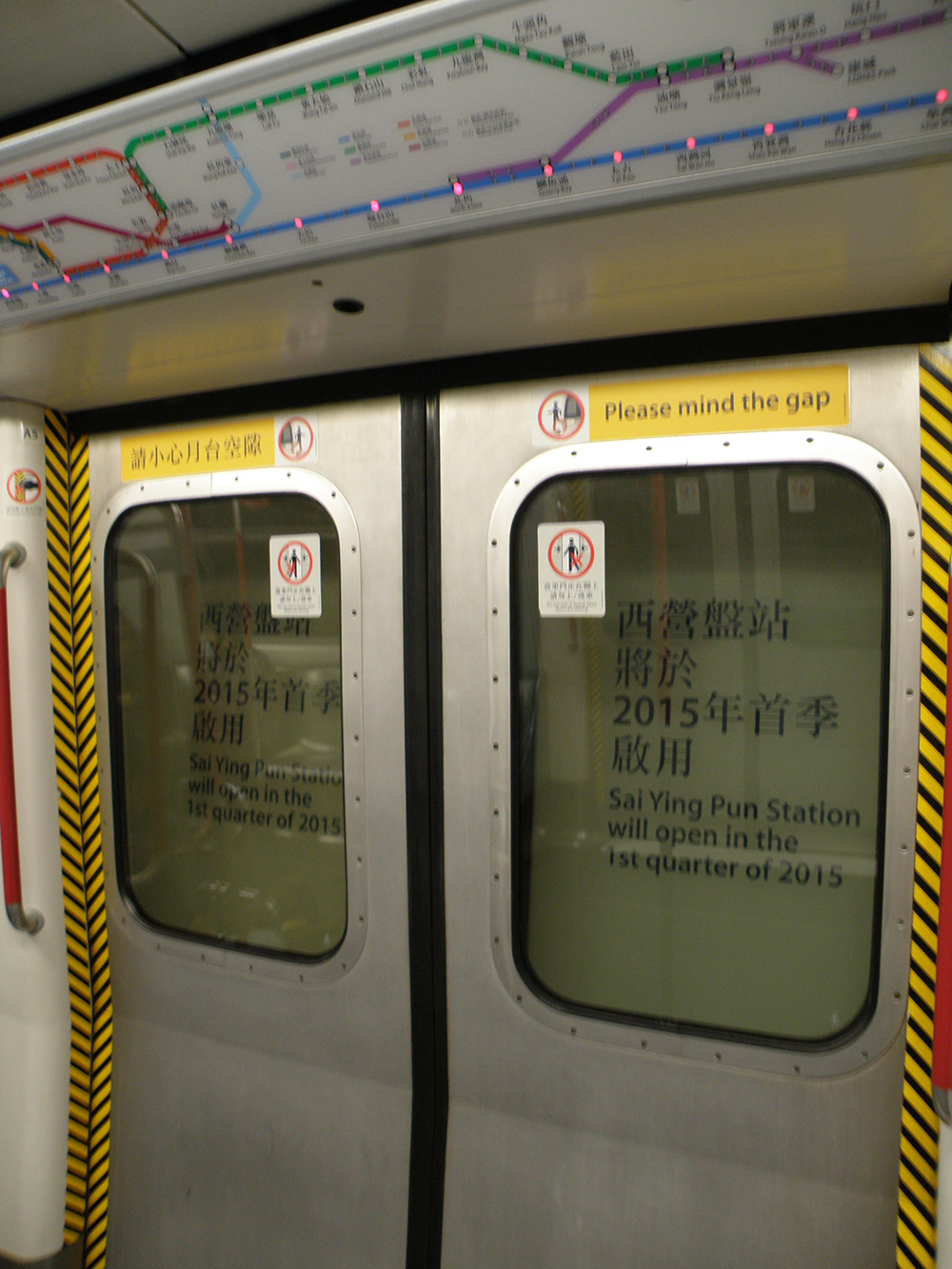
Sai Ying Pun station opening was deferred. When trains stopped at Sai Ying Pun, the doors did not open, and the trains departed without any passenger exchange.

West Island line construction work began in 2009 and expected to completed in 2014. Yet, MTRC revealed the deferral of construction in May 2014. Two entrances of Sai Ying Pun station, which are for Queen's Road West and First Street, had suffered unstable ground condition. The ground-freezing method was used, but it would delay the commencement of Sai Ying Pun. In the same month, MTRC proposed to government that West Island line would be opened as schedule, but Sai Ying Pun would not be in service for public. Government acknowledged and agreed with the plan.

== Commencement ==
West Island line commenced on 28 December 2014 and its first Island line train departed at Kennedy Town at 0600. Trains had skipped Sai Ying Pun. This arrangement stopped when Sai Ying Pun station commenced operations on 29 March 2015.

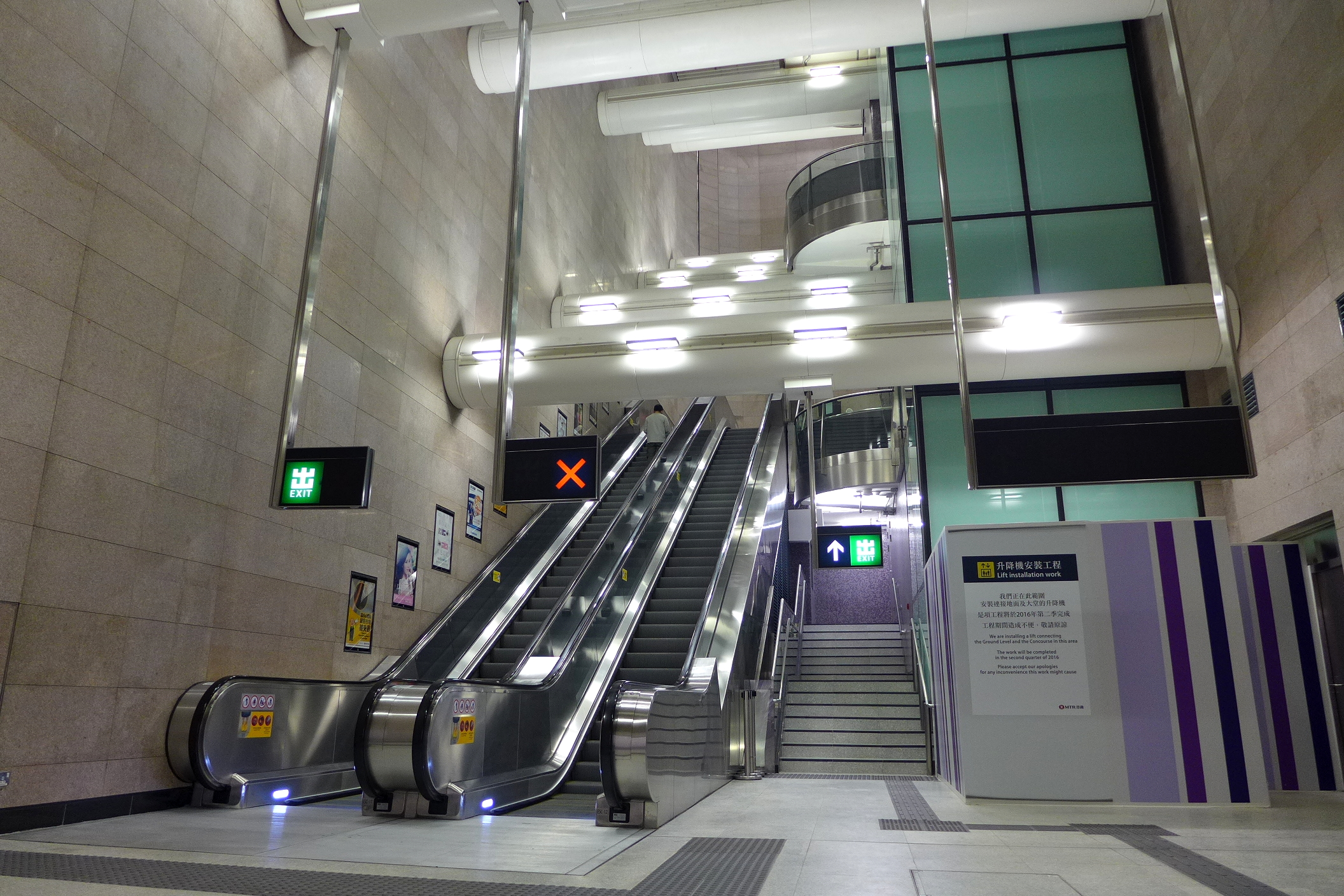
Exit B3 of Sai Ying Pun with escalators, lift and staircase

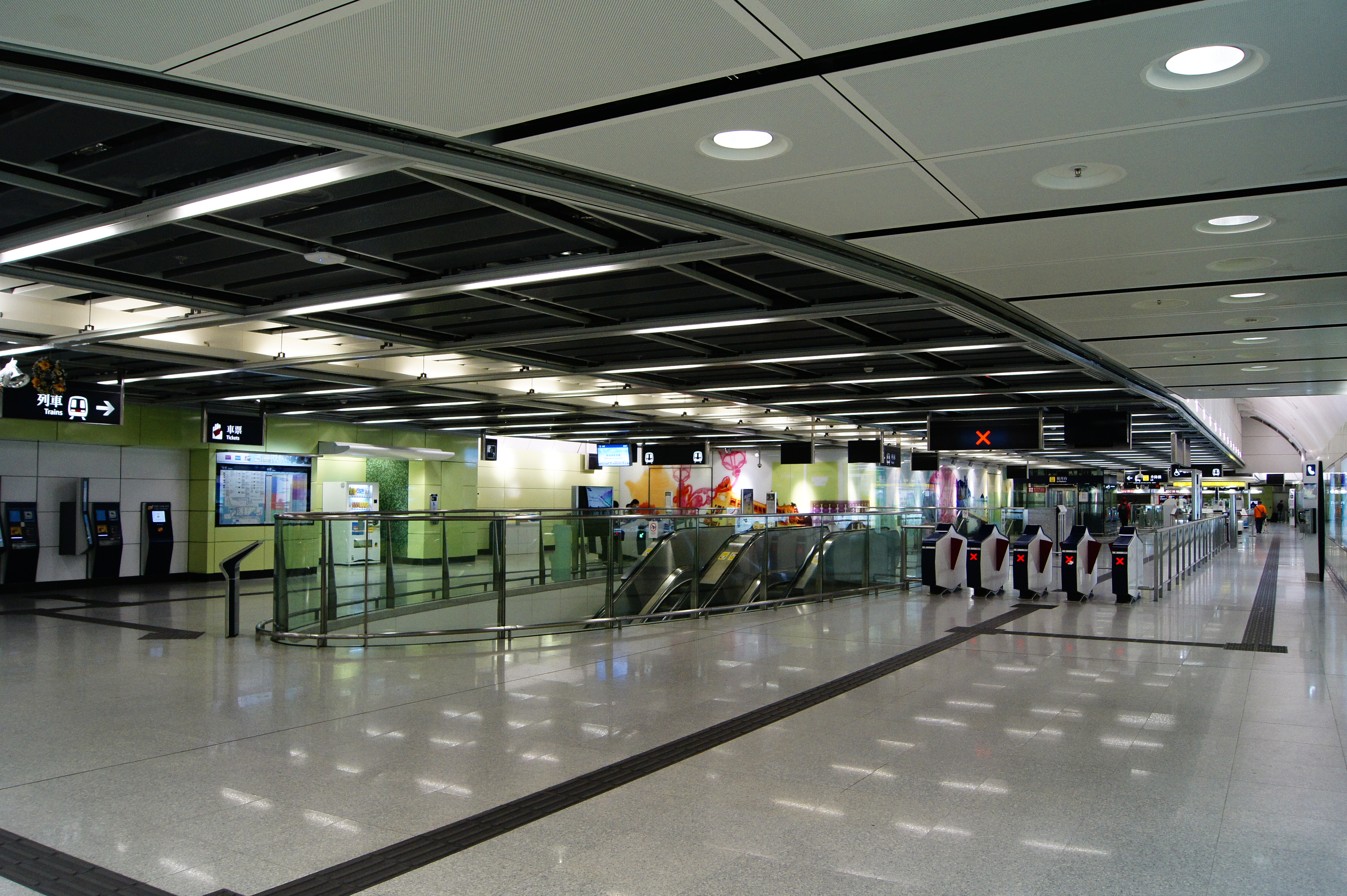
HKU station concourse

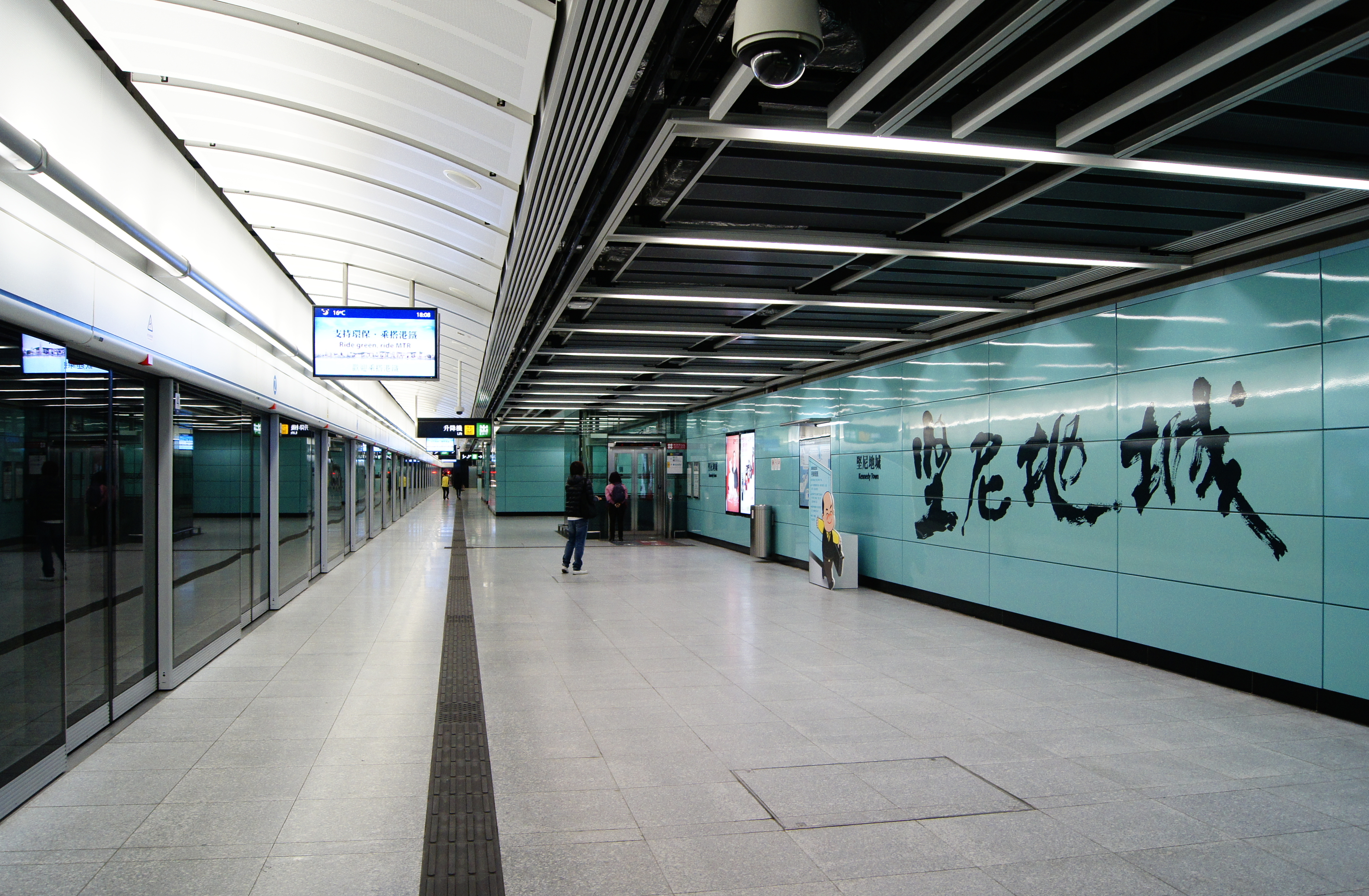
All Island line trains to Kennedy now terminate at Kennedy Town Platform 2

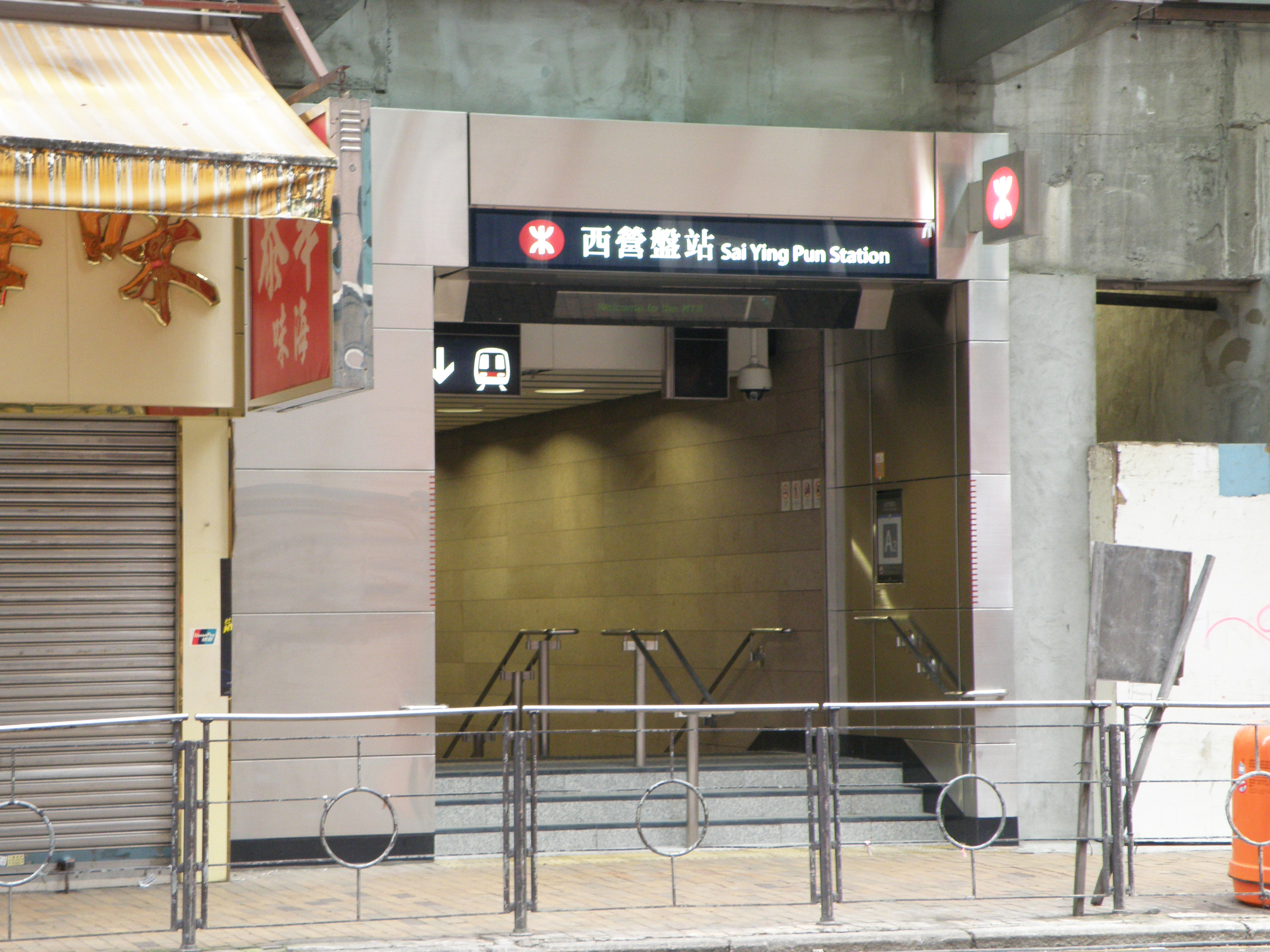
Reserved space at Eco Tree Hotel now serves as entrance A2 of Sai Ying Pun

South Island line opened on 28 December 2016. First train was dispatched from South Horizons at 05:55. Despite the benefits of the railway, it caused controversy among bus users in both cases. For instance, in the former case, passengers from Wah Kwai were forced to switch to a bus via the often congested Aberdeen Tunnel (Citybus Route 70, which only runs every 20-25 minutes from Wah Kwai in the morning) to get to Central, or take the extremely slow Citybus Route 43M (which diverted to a much longer route via Victoria Road because a previous route there, Citybus Route M47, was forcibly cancelled), and lost their direct bus service to Pok Fu Lam Road including the major hospital in Southern District, Queen Mary Hospital. At the same time, Victoria Road passengers including Baguio Villa residents were unhappy because the M47 (every 12-15 minutes initially, and later changed to every 13-20) was more frequent than the 43M (every 20-25 minutes initially, but now every 30 minutes most of the day in 2022 after a major frequency cut, which disproportionately affects Victoria Road passengers) and it also had the advantage of "no need to transfer to Sai Ying Pun, Sheung Wan and Central"). In the latter case, the effects were especially seen during the ongoing pandemic, which led to the cancellation of the express NWFB Route 590. Some routes with little or no direct overlap with the South Island Line were also reduced in frequency before the pandemic, including the aforementioned 43M as well as NWFB Route 595, a major route that South Horizons residents relied on to get to Aberdeen for shopping or other purposes (which is even reduced to every 20 minutes temporarily at at least one time.)

== See also ==
- Future projects of the MTR
- Extension of Island line to Western District
- South Island line
- South Island line (West)
