= Cape D'Aguilar Marine Reserve =

Marine Reserve in Hong Kong

Coordinates: 22.2063°N 114.2573°E

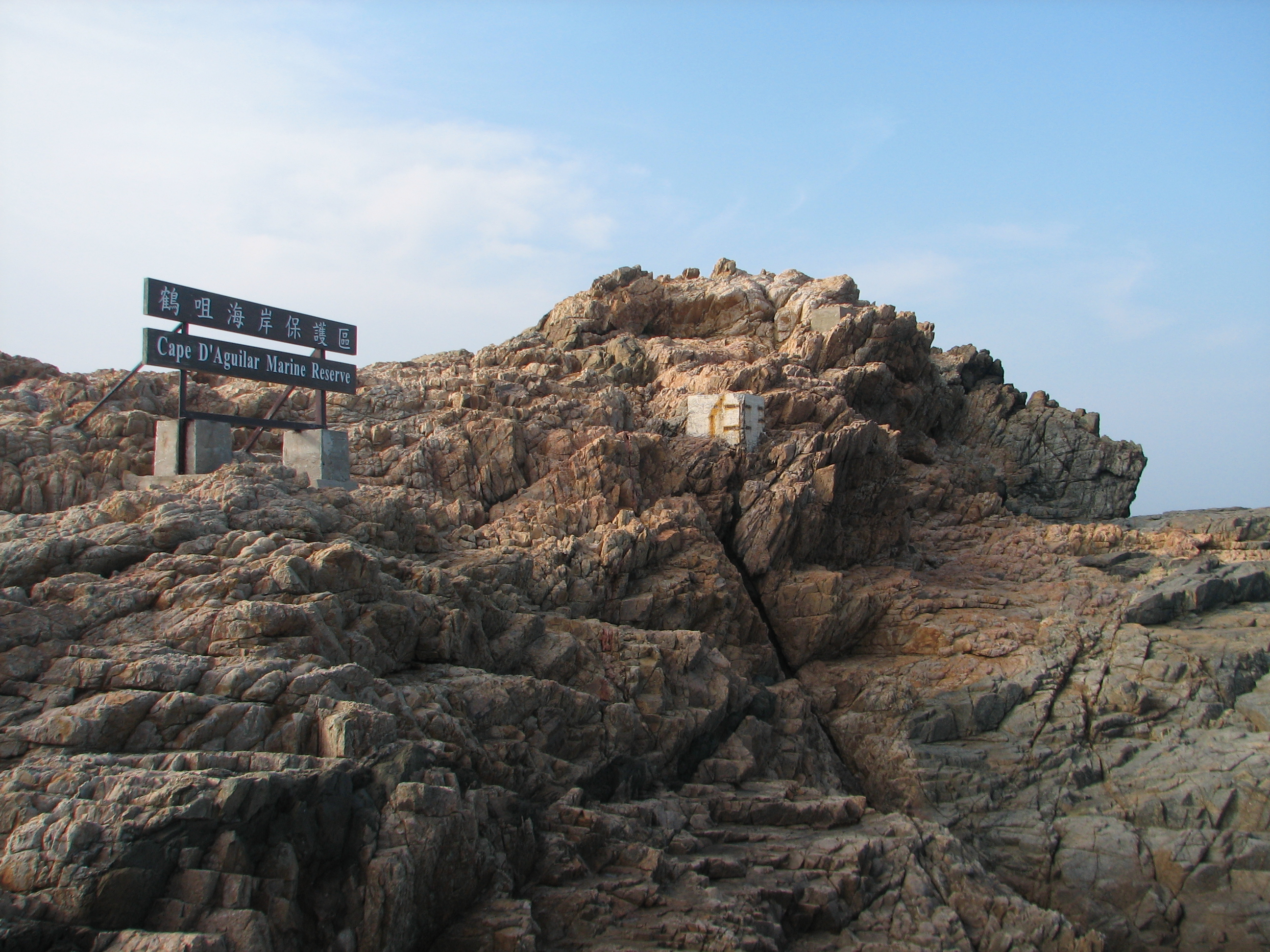
Cape D'Aguilar Marine Reserve sign

Cape D'Aguilar Marine Reserve (Chinese: 鶴咀海岸保護區) is the only Marine Reserve (distinct from Marine Parks) in Hong Kong. It is located at the far south-east corner of Hong Kong Island and covers an area of just 20 hectares (49 acres), mainly between Kau Pei Chau and the rocky coastline. It was designated in July 1996 under the Marine Parks Ordinance to protect the rocky shores and the subtidal habitats in the area.

Cape D'Aguilar Marine Reserve is managed by the Agriculture, Fisheries and Conservation Department (AFCD) with on-site assistance from the Swire Institute of Marine Science, a research faculty of the University of Hong Kong.

== History ==
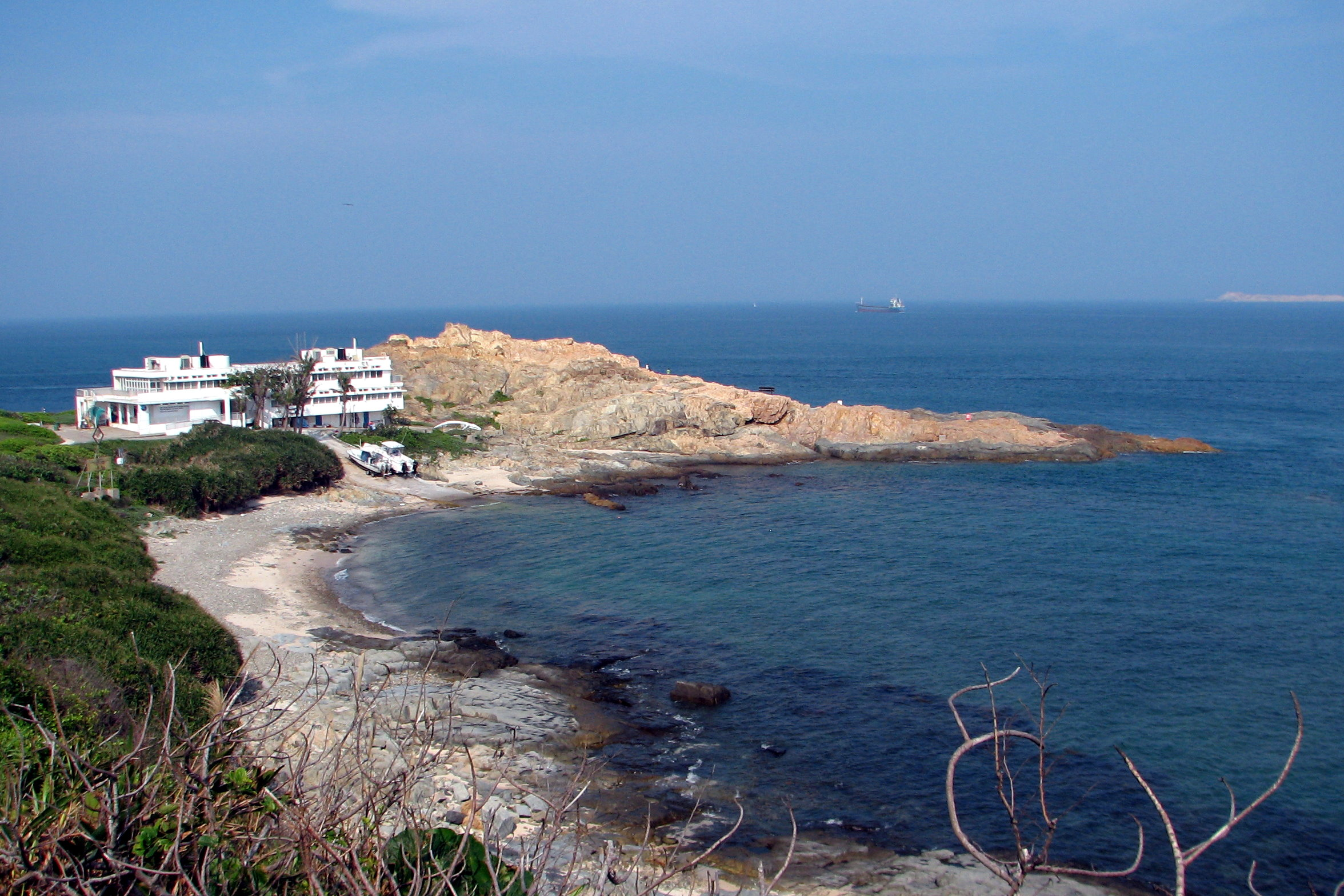
Cape D'Aguilar

In 1991, the area was designated a Site of Special Scientific Interest (SSSI) by the Government. In 1996, it became the only Marine Reserve in Hong Kong.

== Rules in the reserve ==
Fishing, swimming, diving and collecting organisms are strictly prohibited in the marine reserve and a permit must be obtained from the AFCD before conducting research there.

== Display of whale skeleton ==
Since 27 June 1991, a whale skeleton measuring 6.4 m (21 ft) in length has been on display in the marine reserve, near the research facility of the Swire Institute of Marine Science (Swims). The skeleton belongs to a juvenile male fin whale that died on 12 April 1955, but is commonly mistaken as the remains of Hoi Wai, a famous female orca that performed at Ocean Park Hong Kong from 1979 to 1997.

=== Origin ===
The juvenile fin whale was first found on 12 April 1955, floating among debris near the Ming Shan Wharf in Victoria Harbour. While migrating north from the South China Sea, it had separated from its mother, most likely due to sickness. The whale calf appeared lethargic and was slowly starving. Marine police subsequently euthanised it via a gunshot to the head, an outcome considered by Swims to be "the most humane". The marine police originally intended to move the dead whale out to sea, but were met by RV Alister Hardy, a research vessel of the University of Hong Kong (HKU). The whale carcass was subsequently handed off to the research vessel, which towed it to Aberdeen on the south side of Hong Kong Island for processing by HKU zoologists.

As then-British Hong Kong was experiencing a refugee wave from China, the whale's flesh was publicly carved up the following day as food for refugee camps. This attracted an audience of up to 1,000 people. Some superstitious fisherman worried that the "ghost fish" would bring bad luck, and in an attempt to pacify angry spirits, made an 8 m (26 ft) paper whale that they burned and released in Tseung Kwan O.

The whale's skeleton was preserved and displayed across different buildings on the main campus of HKU until 35 years later, when it underwent a year-long reconstruction. On 27 June 1991, it was relocated to its current location, on the shores of Cape D'Aguilar, next to the then-newly established Swire Marine Laboratory (now Swims). Swims considers the whale skeleton an important symbol of marine conservation.

=== 2018 damage and subsequent preservation ===
In September 2018 during Typhoon Mangkhut, some of the skeleton's bones were damaged by waves. The ribs were cracked, the lower right jawbone dislodged, and the left hip bone blown away. Swims subsequently organised the "Restoring Hong Kong’s Whale" campaign to raise funds for repair works. It intends on moving the original skeleton to its new biodiversity centre nearby for preservation, replacing the outdoor display with a 3D-printed copy that can withstand typhoons, salt spray, and Hong Kong's summer weather.

== See also ==
- Cape D'Aguilar
