= Southern District, Hong Kong =

District in Hong Kong

Southern 南區
- District
- Southern District
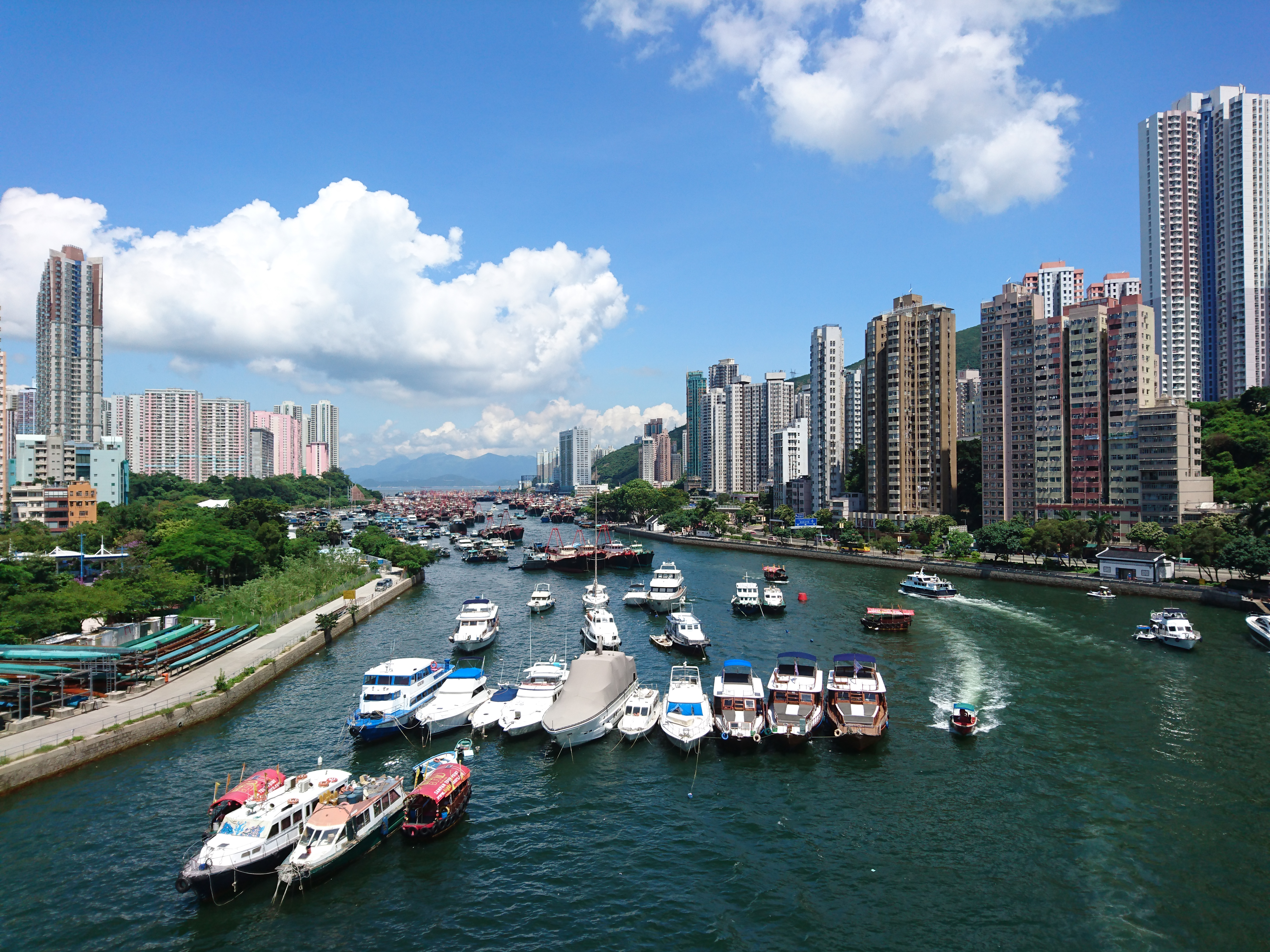
- Day view of Aberdeen in the Southern District

- Location of Southern District within Hong Kong
- Coordinates: 22°14′50″N 114°09′32″E
- Statutory-defined area: Hong Kong
- Region: Hong Kong (special administrative region)
- Country: China
- Constituencies: 17

Government
  - District Council Chairman: vacant
  - District Council Vice-Chairman: Paul Zimmerman
  - District Officer: Cheng Kong-Chung

Area
  - Total: 38.8 km^{2} (15.0 sq mi)

Population (2016)
  - Total: 274,994
  - Density: 7,090/km^{2} (18,400/sq mi)
- Time zone: UTC+8 (Hong Kong Time)
- Largest neighbourhood by population: Ap Lei Chau (86,752 – 2016 est)
- Location of district office and district council: 3 Aberdeen Praya Road, Staunton Creek‌
- Website: Southern District Council

Southern District
- Traditional Chinese: 南區
- Simplified Chinese: 南区
- Cantonese Yale: Nàahm kēui
Transcriptions
Standard Mandarin
- Hanyu Pinyin: Nánqū
Wu
- Wugniu: noe^{2} chiu^{1}
- IPA: Shanghainese: [nø˨ tɕʰy˧]
Yue: Cantonese
- Yale Romanization: Nàahm kēui
- Jyutping: naam^{4} keoi^{1}
- IPA: [nam˩ kʰɵɥ˥]

The Southern District is one of the 18 districts of Hong Kong. It is located in the southern part of Hong Kong Island and the largest part of the island. It had a population of 274,994 in 2016.

== Geography ==
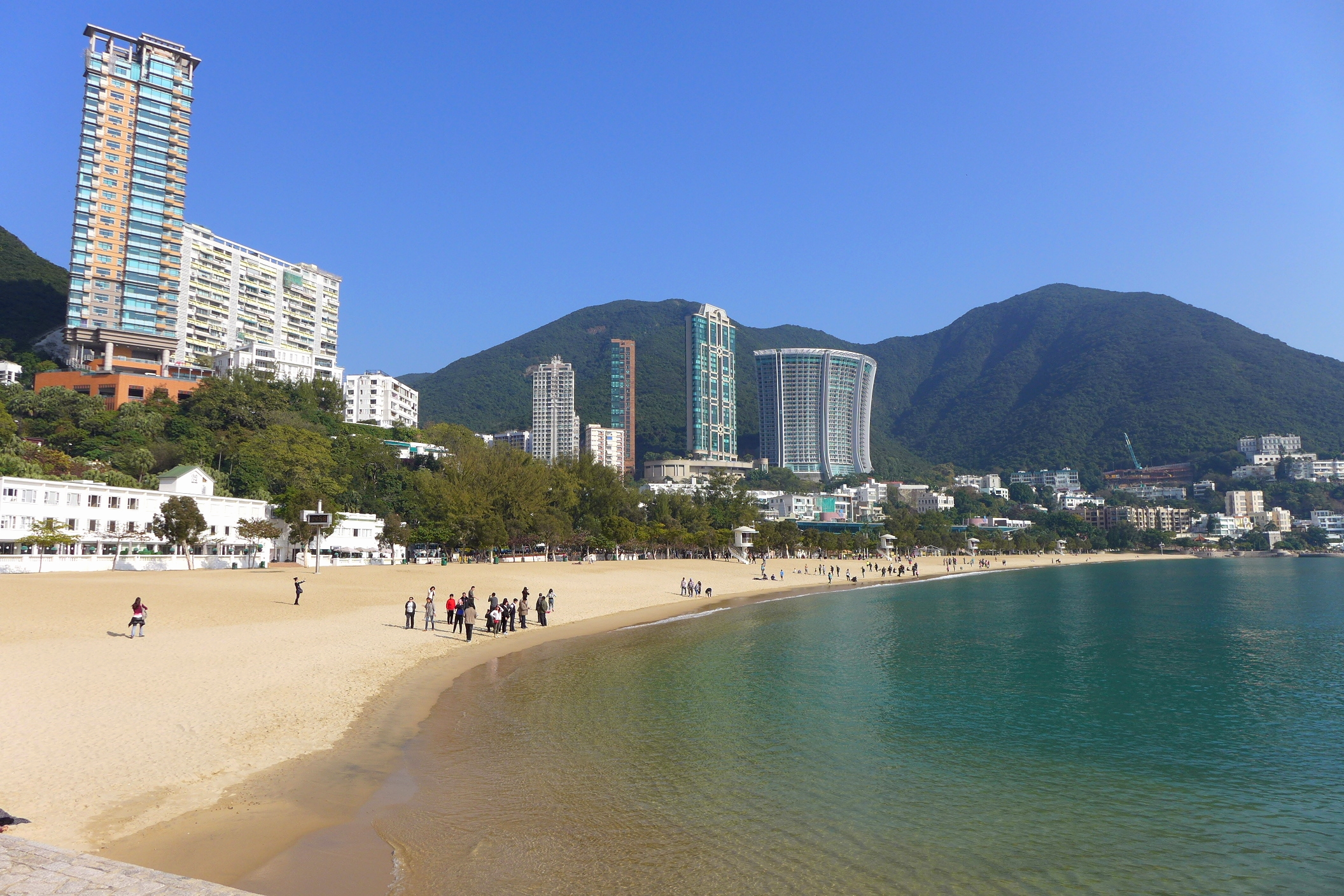
Repulse Bay

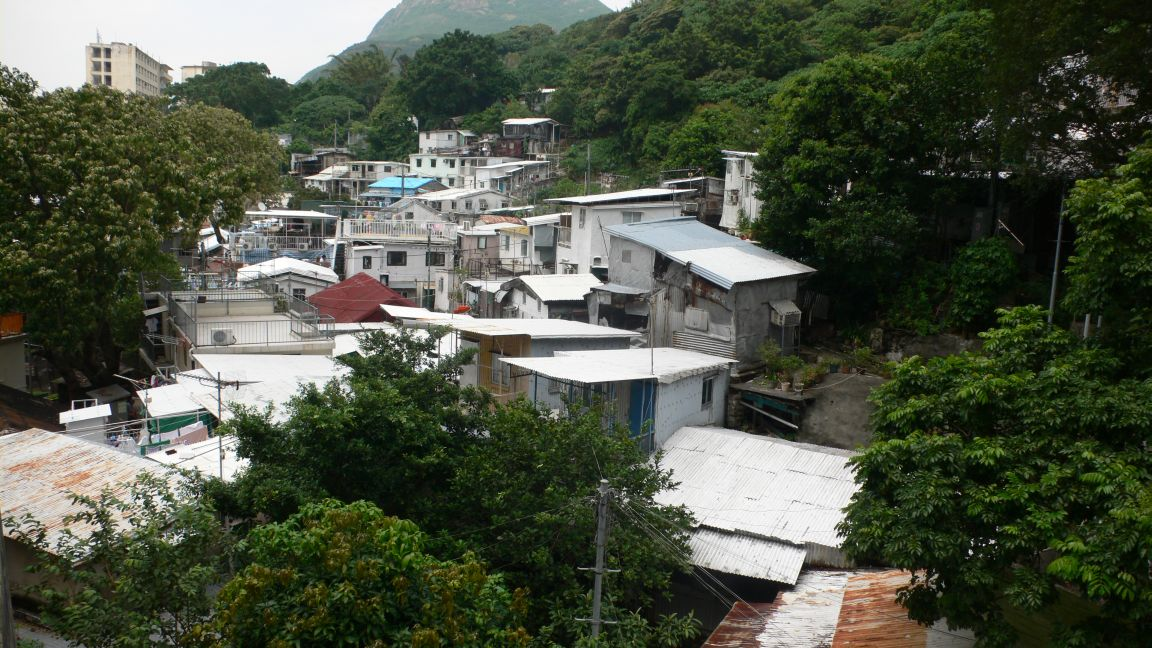
Pok Fu Lam Village

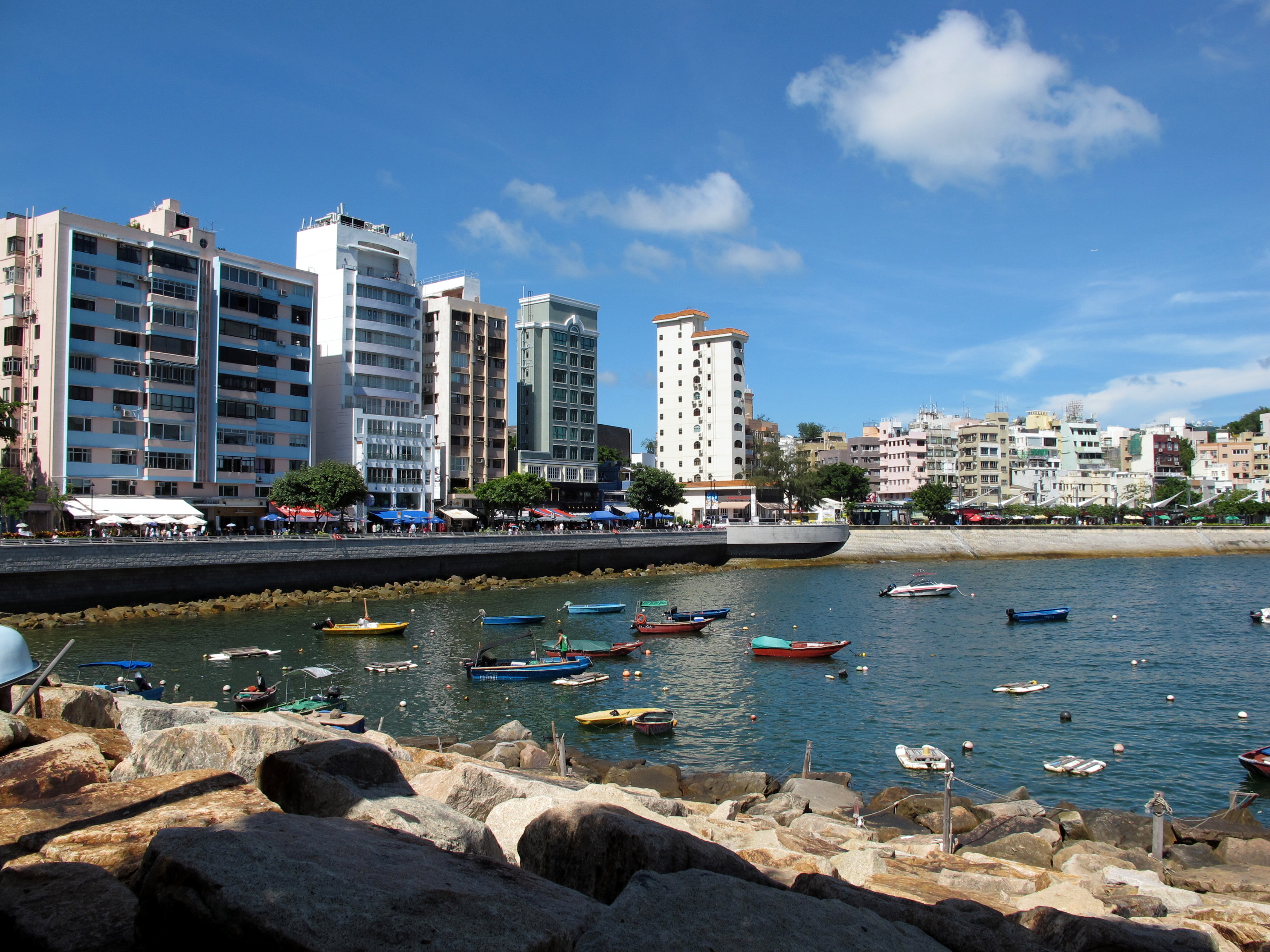
Stanley

The Southern District faces the South China Sea at the south, and is backed by hills and reservoirs, designated as country parks, at the north. The eastern half of the district is semi-rural, with some of Hong Kong's most popular beaches. The western half of the district is partly residential and partly industrial.

== Residential areas ==
The residents of Southern District vary from the Chinese majority, resident minorities, to the community of expatriates. The eastern half containing areas such as Stanley and Repulse Bay is especially popular among expatriates and affluent locals because of the combination of its close proximity to Central and the wholesome environment. The western half of Southern district is more urbanized, with areas such as Aberdeen containing more housing developments than the eastern half.

Large private housing estates in the district include: Baguio Villa, Chi Fu Fa Yuen, Aberdeen Centre, South Horizons, Bel-Air (Cyberport), Redhill Peninsula and Hong Kong Parkview.

== Areas and attractions ==
The district includes the following areas:

- Aberdeen
- Ap Lei Chau, an island connected to Aberdeen by three bridges (two for road and the other for rail)
- Cape D'Aguilar, where Cape D'Aguilar Marine Reserve is located
- Deep Water Bay
- Pok Fu Lam
- Repulse Bay
- Shek O
- Shouson Hill
- Stanley
- Tai Tam
- Wah Fu
- Wong Chuk Hang

Islands of the district:

- Aberdeen Island or Ap Lei Chau
- Ap Lei Pai
- Kau Pei Chau (狗脾洲)
- Lo Chau (羅洲)
- Lung Shan Pai (龍山排)
- Magazine Island (火藥洲)
- Middle Island (熨波洲, Tong Po Chau)
- Ng Fan Chau (五分洲)
- Round Island (銀洲)
- Tai Tau Chau (大頭洲)
- Tau Chau (頭洲)

Tourist attractions within the district include Aberdeen's floating restaurants and fishing harbour; the Ocean Park; the swimming beach of Repulse Bay; The Home of Teresa Teng; the souvenir market and, formerly, the Hong Kong Maritime Museum at Stanley.

== Education ==
- List of schools in Southern District, Hong Kong

Hong Kong Public Libraries operates four libraries in this district, at Aberdeen, Ap Lei Chau, Pok Fu Lam, and Stanley.

== Transport ==
The Southern District is served by Pok Fu Lam Road, Aberdeen Tunnel, Wong Nai Chung Gap Road and Tai Tam Road. It became the last district of Hong Kong to be served by the MTR, when the South Island line commenced operations in 2016, linking Ap Lei Chau and Wong Chuk Hang with Admiralty. The proposed MTR South Island line (West) will serve the western half of the area. There are currently no proposed routes to Stanley or Repulse Bay due to the large number of buses that serve those destinations.

== See also ==
- List of places in Hong Kong
