= Larry Griffin (disambiguation) =

Larry Griffin (1954–1995) was an American criminal.

Larry Griffin may also refer to:

- Larry Griffin (American football)
- Symbolyc One, music producer ne Larry Griffin
- Larry Griffin (thief) of the Patsy Conroy Gang
- Larry Griffin, Irish postman who disappeared in 1929, likely murdered
