= Wong Chuk Hang San Wai =

Village in Southern District, Hong Kong

Coordinates: 22.249161°N 114.176695°E

- Traditional Chinese: 黃竹坑新圍
- Simplified Chinese: 黄竹坑新围
- Literal meaning: "Yellow Bamboo Pit New Village"
Transcriptions
Standard Mandarin
- Hanyu Pinyin: Huángzhúkēng Xīn Wéi
Yue: Cantonese
- Jyutping: Wong4zuk1haang1 san1 wai4

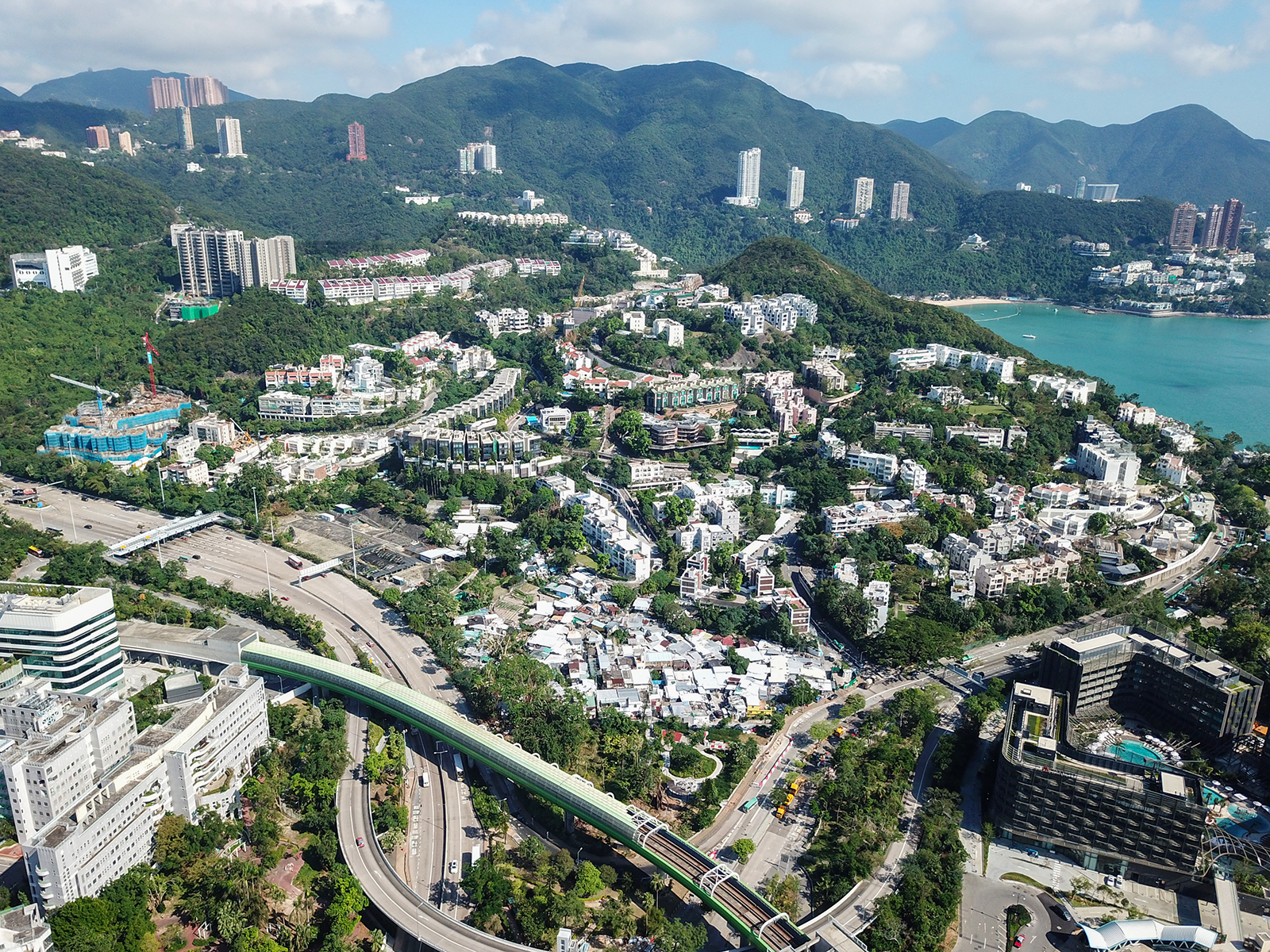
View of Shouson Hill, with Wong Chuk Hang San Wai visible in the foreground.

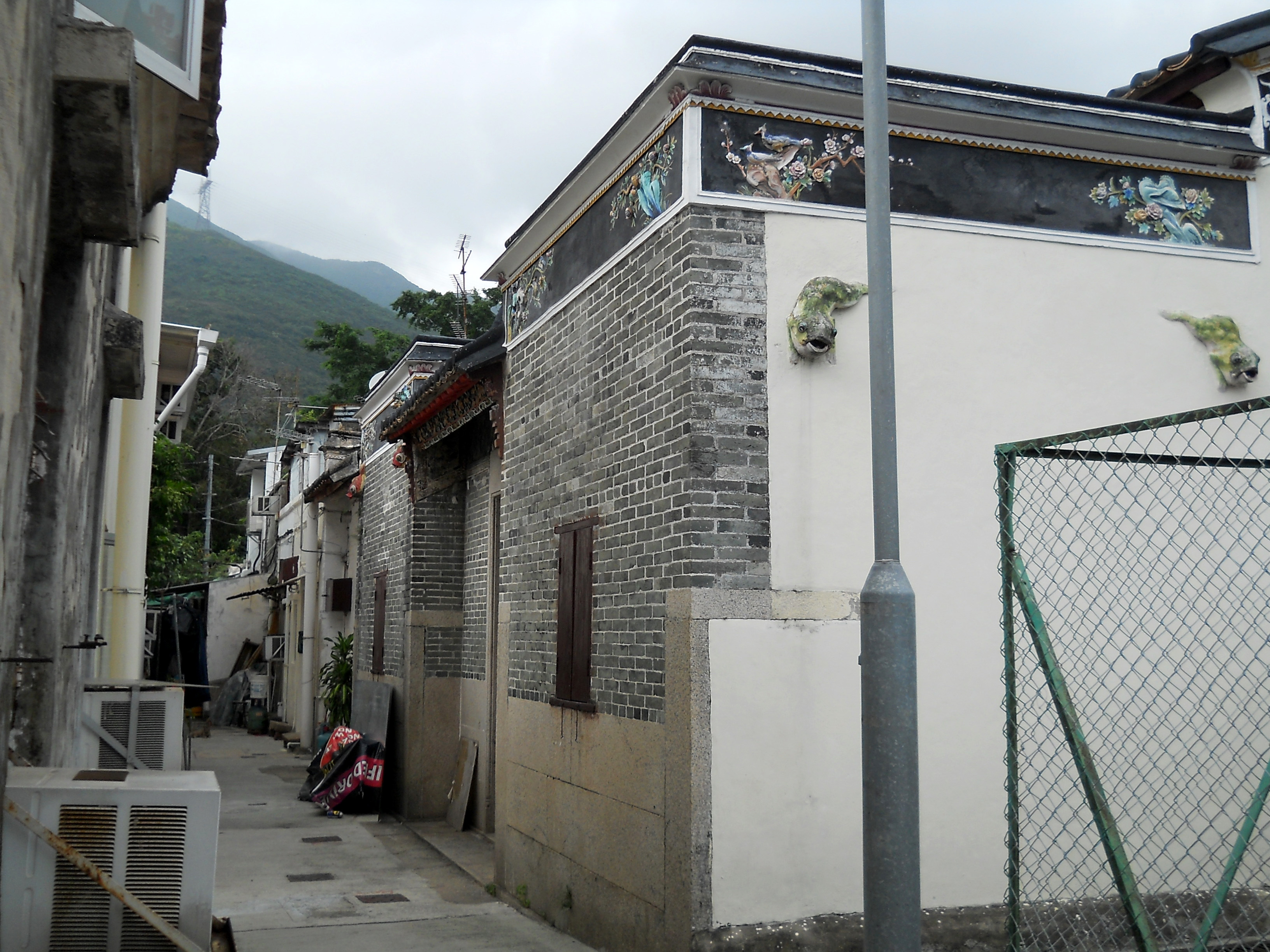
Old House, No. 10 Wong Chuk Hang San Wai

Wong Chuk Hang San Wai (Chinese: 黃竹坑新圍; lit. 'Wong Chuk Hang new village') is a village in the Wong Chuk Hang area of Southern District, Hong Kong. It is located at the bottom of Shouson Hill.

== Administration ==
For electoral purposes, Wong Chuk Hang San Wai is part of the Bays Area constituency, which is currently represented by Jonathan Leung Chun.

== History ==
Wong Chuk Hang San Wai was established in the 1860s and 1870s, as the population of nearby Wong Chuk Hang Kau Wai (黃竹坑舊圍; 'Wong Chuk Hang old village') grew. Wong Chuk Hang Kau Wai had been established in the 18th century by members of the Chow clan of Guangdong province. Sir Shouson Chow is said to have been born in Wong Chuk Hang San Wai in 1861.

Wong Chuk Hang Kau Wai appears as 'Heung-kong-wai' (香港圍, 'Hong Kong Wai' in modern transliteration) on the "Map of the San-On District", published in 1866 by Simeone Volonteri. A substantial part of the village was demolished at the time of the construction of Aberdeen Tunnel.

At the time of the 1911 census, the population of Wong Chuk Hang was 57. The number of males was 44.
