= Little Hong Kong =

Little Hong Kong may refer to:

- Aberdeen, Hong Kong, an area on southwest Hong Kong Island in Hong Kong
- Central Ordnance Munitions Depot, military site in Abedeen, Hong Kong, which the British named Little Hong Kong
- Little Hong Kong/Guangdong, area in New York City
