= Woodhouse, County Waterford =

Coordinates: 52.124°N 7.475°W

Woodhouse Estate
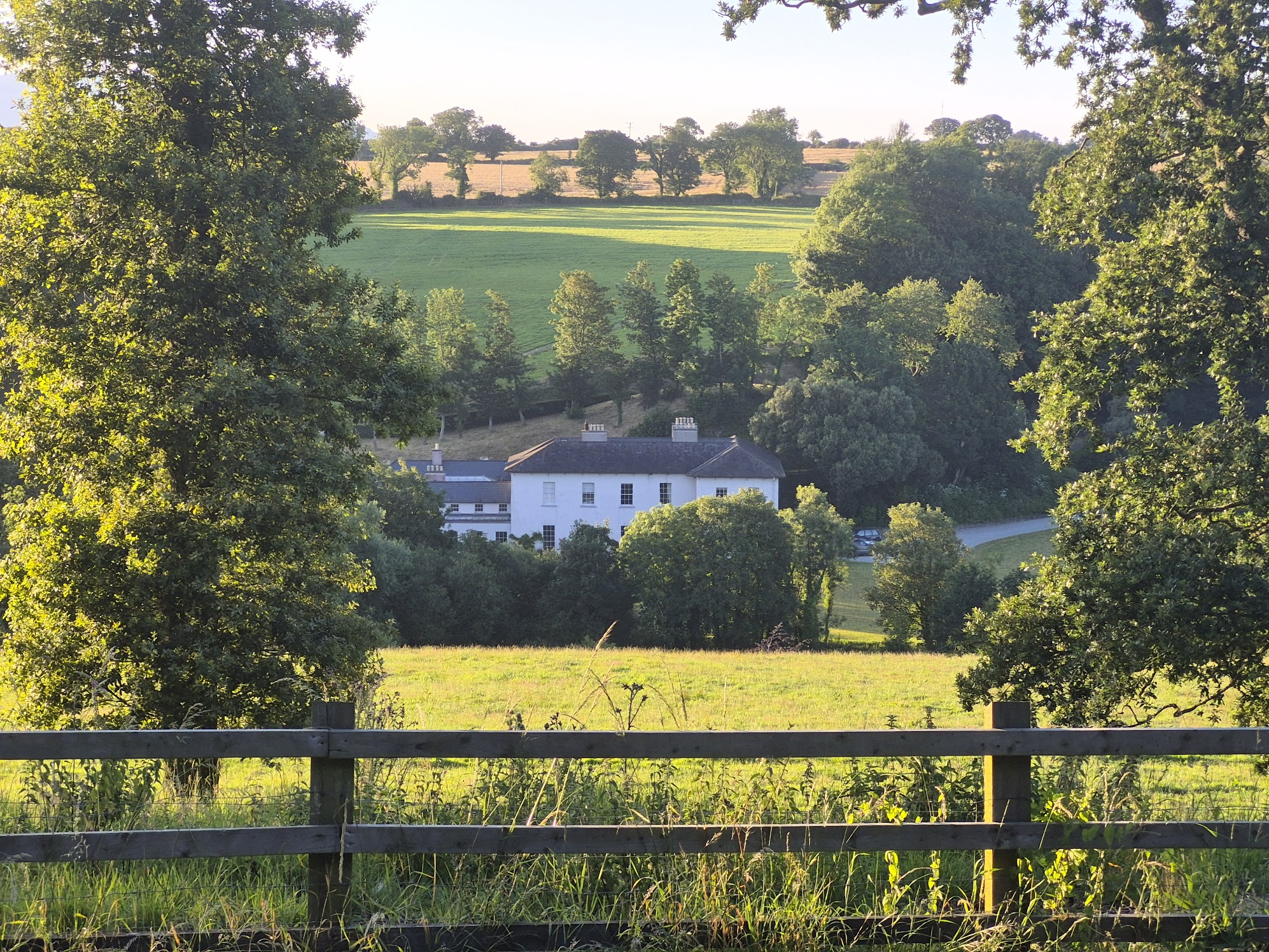

General information
- Location: Stradbally, Co. Waterford
- Owner: Jim Thompson

Woodhouse is a Georgian mansion and c. 500-acre estate just outside the village of Stradbally, County Waterford, Ireland.

The original house was built in the early part of the 16th century by the Fitzgeralds (a branch of the Desmond Geraldines) and was owned by them up to 1724. By 1774 it was recorded as being in the possession of the Uniake family, and by the time of Griffith's Valuation in 1868 it was owned by Robert Uniacke and was valued at £52 10s.

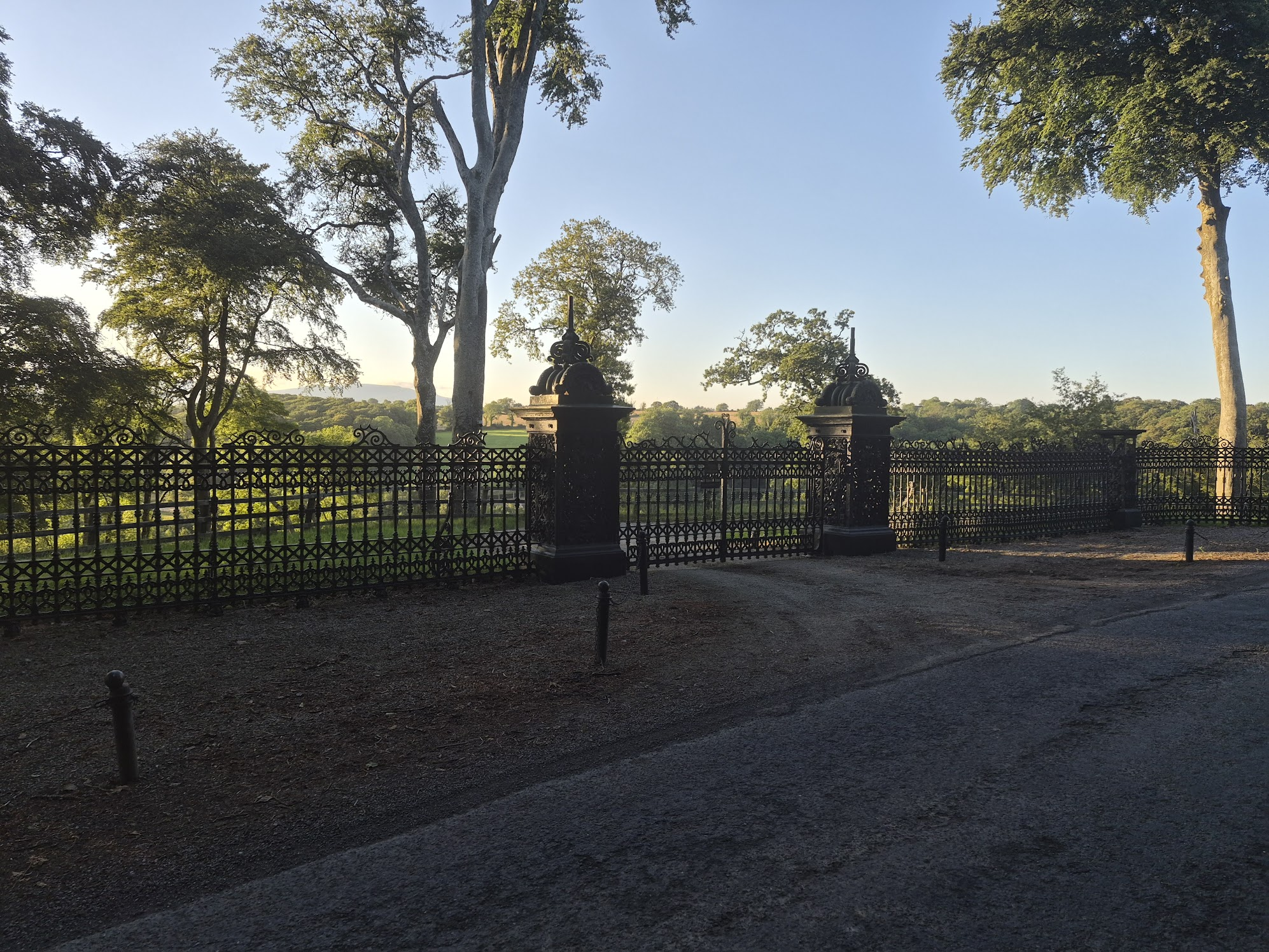
The entrance to Woodhouse Estate in Stradbally

In 1855 the house came into the ownership of a branch of the Beresford family and in 1894 the house and estate were recorded as the seat of Robert H. Beresford. In 1906 it was the property of John Beresford and still valued at over £52. In 1942, the Irish Tourist Association survey notes that the owner of the house, Major Lord William Beresford was then resident in India.

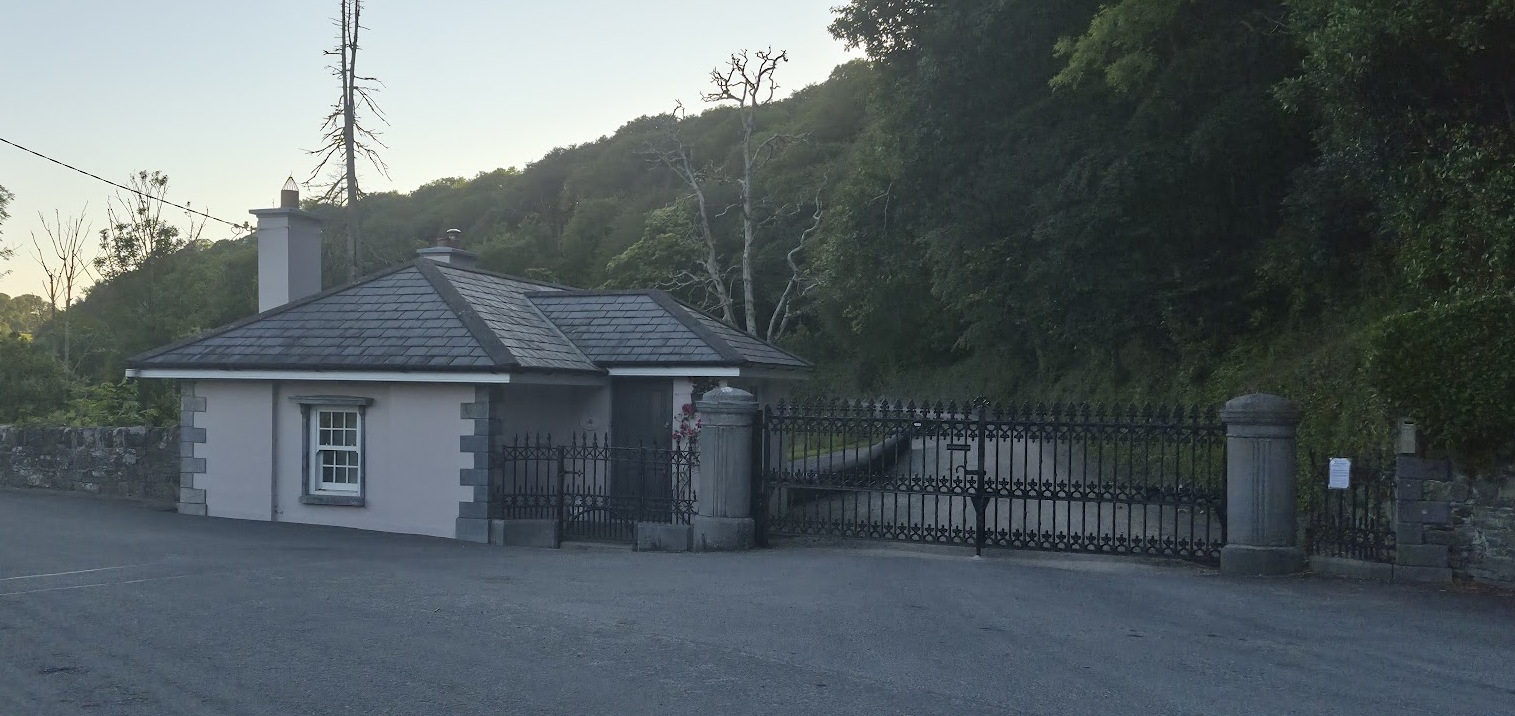
The Gatehouse for Woodhouse Estate in Stradbally

The entry for the house in the National Inventory of Architectural Heritage (NIAH) describes it as a "Detached three-bay single-storey over basement gate lodge, c.1850, with three-bay two-storey rear elevation to south". The entry refers to the house's "Square-headed window openings with stone sills, and one with rendered surround having hood moulding over on consoles". The NIAH notes that a number of replacements and renovations to the features of the house in the mid-20th century.

The property was bought in 2012 for €6.5m by American businessman Jim Thompson, the founder and chairman of Crown Worldwide Group.

Several buildings on the estate and in the village have been renovated as tourist accommodation and event spaces. The estate hosts public events throughout the year, including afternoon tea, children's events and events related to art and business.
