= Bays Area (constituency) =

- Elected constituency for the Southern District Council
- Boundary of Bays Area in Southern District
- District: Southern
- Legislative Council constituency: Hong Kong Island West
- Population: 18,410 (2019)
- Electorate: 4,152 (2019)

Current constituency
- Created: 1994
- Number of members: One
- Member: Jonathan Leung Chun (Liberal)

Bays Area is one of the 17 constituencies in the Southern District, Hong Kong.

The constituency returns one district councillor to the Southern District Council, with an election every four years. The incumbent councillor is Fergus Fung.

Bays Area constituency is loosely based on the areas of the Shouson Hill, Deep Water Bay, Repulse Bay, Middle Bay and South Bay in the southern part of the Hong Kong Island with estimated population of 16,270.

== Councillors represented ==
Election	Member	Party
1994	Alex Chan King-ho	Liberal
1996	Alex Chan King-ho	DAB
1999	Howard Young	Liberal
2007	Fergus Fung Se-guon	Liberal
2019	Jonathan Leung Chun	Liberal

== Election results ==
=== 2010s ===
Southern District Council Election, 2019: Bays Area
Party	Candidate	Votes	%	±%
Liberal	Jonathan Leung Chun	1,882	69.99	+3.09
Nonpartisan	Ding Wai-leung	807	30.01	
Majority		1,075	39.98	
Turnout		2,697	64.96	
Liberal hold		Swing		

Southern District Council Election, 2015: Bays Area
Party	Candidate	Votes	%	±%
Liberal	Fergus Fung Se-goun	957	66.9	–8.9
Nonpartisan	David John Schaus	474	33.1	
Majority		484	33.8	
Turnout		1,442	38.7	
Liberal hold		Swing		

Southern District Council Election, 2011: Bays Area
Party	Candidate	Votes	%	±%
Liberal	Fergus Fung Se-goun	970	75.8	+14.7
Civic	Albert Lai Kwong-tak	309	24.2	
Liberal hold		Swing		

=== 2000s ===
Southern District Council Election, 2007: Bays Area
Party	Candidate	Votes	%	±%
Liberal	Fergus Fung Se-goun	448	61.1	
Independent	Albert Leung Sze-ho	285	38.9	
Liberal hold		Swing		

Southern District Council Election, 2003: Bays Area
Party	Candidate	Votes	%	±%
Liberal	Howard Young	1,119	65.1	
DAB	Zheng Qiao-you	600	34.9	
Liberal hold		Swing		

=== 1990s ===
Southern District Council Election, 1999: Bays Area
Party	Candidate	Votes	%	±%
Liberal	Howard Young	507	50.6	
DAB	Alex Chan King-ho	488	48.8	
Liberal gain from DAB		Swing		

Southern District Board Election, 1994: Bays Area
Party	Candidate	Votes	%	±%
Liberal	Alex Chan King-ho	507	50.6	
HKDF	Alan Lung Ka-lun	272	37.9	
Liberal win (new seat)				
