= Stradbally, County Waterford =

Village in Ireland

Stradbally An tSráidbhaile (Irish)
- Village
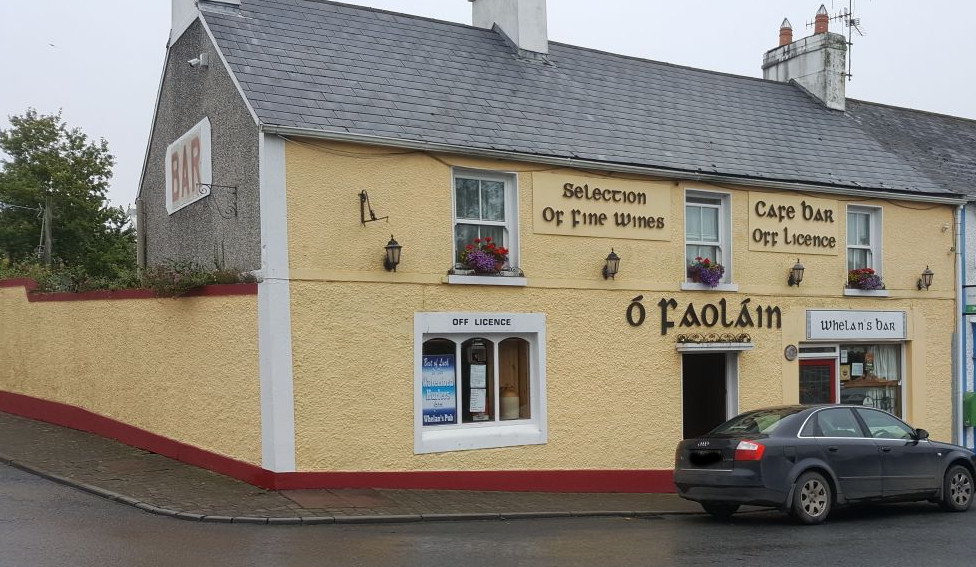
- Pub in Stradbally

- Location in Ireland
- Coordinates: 52°07′48″N 7°27′36″W
- Country: Ireland
- Province: Munster
- County: County Waterford

Population (2016)
  - Total: 438
- Time zone: UTC+0 (WET)
  - Summer (DST): UTC-1 (IST (WEST))

Stradbally (from Irish An tSráidbhaile, meaning 'the (one) street town', IPA:[ˈanˠˈt̪ˠɾˠaːdʲˌwalʲə]) is a village in County Waterford, Ireland. The village is in a civil parish of the same name.

Stradbally has been recognised in the national Tidy Towns competition on many occasions, and is known as a pristine village with a very active local involvement in the upkeep of the area. Stradbally is known as "a shining example of what can be done through community involvement and pride of place" according to the judges of the competition.

The village has a stop on the Local link bus service Route 367 between Dungarvan and Tramore, which operates daily with several services per day, providing transport connections for the village residents, and other villages along the coast, to access the bigger towns in the area.

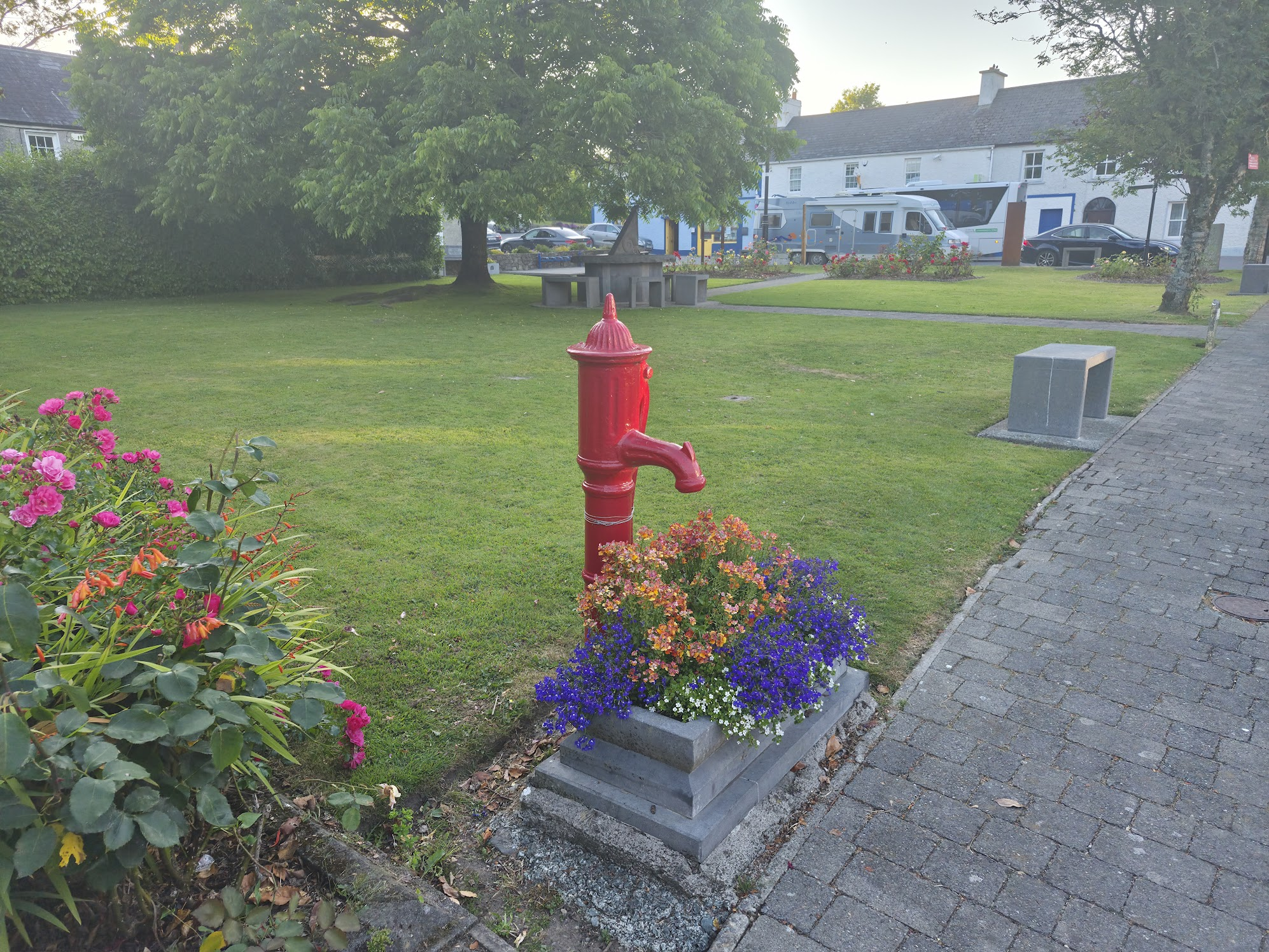
The village park in the centre of Stradbally in County Waterford

== History ==
=== Medieval period ===
In 1215, King John granted the custody of the counties of Waterford and Desmond (most of Cork and Kerry) to Thomas fitz Anthony. This was a reward for fitz Anthony's support for the king in fighting rebel barons in England at the time. Thomas fitz Anthony seems to have founded the medieval town of Stradbally, which was situated at the centre of his lordship (he also founded Thomastown in County Kilkenny). Thomas fitz Anthony died in 1226 or 1227 and the lordship subsequently passed to one of his sons-in-law, Thomas de Dene. When Thomas de Dene's son Reginald died in 1302, he held a quarter of the town of Stradbally from the king. Stradbally subsequently passed to a branch of the FitzGeralds, Earls of Desmond, who held it until the early 18th century. In 1300, when King Edward I levied his Irish domains to finance his war against Scotland, Stradbally was one of five towns in the county to be assessed for special payments. It is also known that Stradbally had a mill, as there are references to it in 1298 and 1336, but its location is not known. All this suggests that Stradbally was an important medieval town. All that remains of medieval Stradbally, however, is its church; it is not known what became of the rest of the town. In 1654 the Civil Survey described Stradbally as ‘a County Towne with a greate many howses’, which suggests that the medieval settlement had survived in some form up until then.

=== 18th and 19th centuries ===
The present village of Stradbally dates from around the end of the 18th century, and was built by the Uniacke family of Woodhouse, who owned the village and most of the surrounding district. At the centre of the village is a market square surrounded by terraces of two-storey houses and businesses. The three-storey building which dominates the east side of the square is a former police barracks, and is probably slightly older than the buildings around it.

Stradbally has two churches. St James’ Church of Ireland church is located at the top of Church Lane, just behind the ruined medieval church. Work on this church began with the appointment of John Devereux as Vicar of Stradbally in 1798. The main body of the church was completed in 1802, with the addition of a tower four years later. The tower was originally topped with a spire, but this was removed in 1876 when the chancel was added. The church also had a gallery, accessed from the first floor of the belfry, but this is also long since gone. The church was dedicated to St James in 1970. It is typical of the numerous Church of Ireland churches built by the Board of First Fruits in the late 18th and early 19th centuries. The Board was an institution of the Church of Ireland that was established in 1711 by Queen Anne to build and improve churches in Ireland. Holy Cross Catholic church is located a short distance outside the village. A map from 1819 shows a church just south of where the present church now stands. The present church, a large, single-cell, barn-type structure, was built in 1834. Stained glass windows were added in 1868, followed by an imposing tower in 1870 and an apse in 1873. These additions were largely funded by the Barron family.

The Sisters of Mercy came to Stradbally in 1875 at the invitation of the parish priest, Fr Thomas Casey. Initially they lived in Myrtle Lodge, then in 1883 they moved into what had been Hannigan's Hotel in the square (now Whelan's pub). When Fr Casey died in 1885, the sisters moved into the former parochial house behind Holy Cross Church, renaming it Mount St Joseph's. They also built a school in the grounds, which opened in 1890. In addition to this the sisters established a small linen industry to give employment to local girls. The industry was successful and lasted for over thirty years, but mass production and cheap imports led to its closure in 1925. Dwindling vocations led to the convent's closure in 1988.

The school established by the sisters was not the only one in the village. A Church of Ireland school existed by the 19th century, opposite the Church of Ireland church. In 1819, the school was kept by the curate, who taught 'English, Greek and Latin, at £30 per annum for boarders, and four guineas for day boys'. The school has opened and shut several times, depending on numbers, but it continues in use to this day as St James’ National School. In 1806, local Catholic landowner Pierce Barron opened a school ‘for the gratuitous education of the poor of the parish’. The building was divided in two – boys were taught at one end and girls at the other. The building functioned as a boys' school until 1966 when the new boys’ school opened nearby. The Barron School was repurposed as a community hall, and has been extensively restored in recent years. In his Topographical Dictionary (1837), Samuel Lewis mentions a school supported by Mrs Uniacke of Woodhouse. This was located on the bank of the River Tay, at the entrance to Stradbally Cove. A painting of the school is held by the National Library. The building is now known as Cove Lodge.

The Woodhouse Estate was bought by the American businessman JimThompson in 2012.

=== 20th century ===
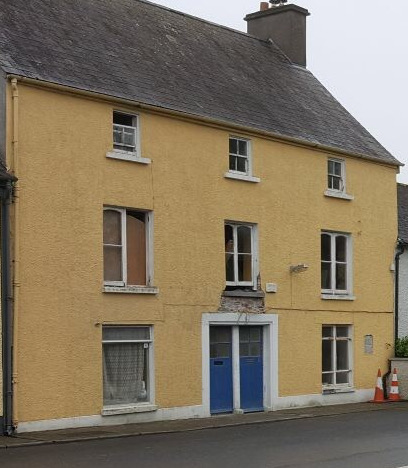
Former Garda station in Stradbally

Stradbally GAA club was founded in 1886. Stradbally team won five senior Gaelic football county football titles in a row from 1940 to 1944. The club also won five-in-a-row again from 2001 to 2005. Gaelic games were played in several locations in the district, before the club acquired a permanent pitch in the early 1970s and a clubhouse was built in 1979. There is also a handball alley, on the Chapel Road, which dates from the 1930s.

On Christmas Day 1929, local postman Larry Griffin disappeared from the village. Several residents were arrested and charged but the case fell apart and all were acquitted.

== Built heritage ==
=== Medieval church ===
Stradbally's ruined medieval church is situated beside the present Church of Ireland church. A large building, it comprises three sections – the nave, the chancel and the tower. The oldest (c.1215) and largest part of the church is the nave, rectangular in shape and over 17 metres long. It consists of two doorways, one each in the north and south walls. Either side of the north doorway are draw-bar sockets, for securing the door on the inside; in times of danger, the bar was drawn across and reinforced the door. Just inside the south doorway is a stoup or font for holy water, carved out of a single block of sandstone. The west gable was once surmounted by a bell-cot (a small shelter for the church bell), which was still there when John O’Donovan from the Ordnance Survey visited in 1841. This has now gone, but the remains of a small window can still be seen. Originally there would have been an arch connecting the nave with the chancel, but this is also now gone. The present chancel is a post-medieval rebuild. In the sanctuary, against the east gable, is a gravestone to the Powers of Ballyvoile – the inscription outlines their genealogy in detail, although doubt has been cast on elements of it.

The tower probably dates from the 13th or 14th century, and consisted of three storeys. What now remains of the tower is the north half; the south half may have collapsed into the original chancel, necessitating the reconstruction of same. In the surviving north portion of the tower are the remains of a spiral staircase. The tower probably served as a residence for the priest.

Perhaps due to its spacious interior, the church has often been mistaken for an Augustinian abbey. This belief probably stems from the fact that for over 300 years, the church was in the possession of the Augustinian Priory of Inistioge which, like Stradbally, was founded by Thomas fitz Anthony. In 1540, at the height of the Reformation, the church and rectory of Stradbally were taken over by the Crown, and came under the control of the Bishop of Lismore. It is not known how long the church remained open after this. In 1615 it was described as being in a dilapidated state.

The oldest dated gravestone in the churchyard, adorned with a skull and crossbones, is that of Michael Martin who died in 1717. Another inscribed gravestone lies prone in the corner of the nave. Around the edge of this stone is an inscription, the surviving portion of which reads: 'YSABELLA GAL… JACET PLNI'. The top of the stone is covered in a variety of symbols, including the lily (symbolising the Resurrection) and possible an all-seeing eye. The stone may date from the 17th century, when the church was possibly still in use. While the identity of "Ysabella" is not known, it has been speculated that she was a Galvin or Galwey, both of which are local names. One 19th-century scholar, however, thought that the stone had nothing to do with anyone named Ysabella, and suggested that if the inscription was complete, it would read: 'Beneath this altar lie the remains of Blessed Paulinus'.
