= James E. Thompson =

American businessman

- Born: January 14, 1940 (age 86)
- Education: San Jose State University (BS)
- Occupation: Businessman
- Known for: Founder of The Crown Worldwide Group
- Title: Chairman
- Spouse: Sally Thompson
- Children: 2

James E. Thompson, GBS (born January 14, 1940) is an American businessman who is the founder, chairman and chief executive of Crown Worldwide Group.

== Early life and education ==
Thompson was born in Jersey City, New Jersey and raised in Bayonne. His father was in the United States Navy and Thompson visited and lived in many places during his childhood, including Guam. He eventually made his way to California and attended San Jose State University. While studying at San Jose State University, Thompson was a brother of Alpha Tau Omega (Epsilon Chi Chapter). After graduating with a Bachelor of Science degree in aeronautical engineering, Thompson formed what is now known as The Crown Worldwide Group.

== Career ==
Thompson established Crown's first operation in 1965. Thompson was living in Japan at the time and recognized the need for an international moving service. With only US$1,000 in his bank account, he established Transport Services International in Yokohama. In 1970, the company expanded into Hong Kong and thereafter into other Asia Pacific locations. In 1975, Transport Services International became Crown Pacific, and by the early 1980s was established as the leading moving company in Asia. In later years, offices were established across America, Australasia and Europe, and the company was renamed Crown Worldwide Group.

Thompson was awarded the Gold Bauhinia Star, which is presented to eminent persons in Hong Kong who have given distinguished service to the community or who have rendered public or voluntary service of a very high degree of merit.

== Organizations and charity work ==
Lt. Gen Ma Chhoeun, adviser to the Cambodian prime minister, Hun Sen; Thompson and his sister, Hazel Joyce, honoring their mother Sadie

Following the opening of Crown's facility in Phnom Penh, Cambodia, Thompson and his wife Sally traveled to the region, where it was brought to their attention that the village of Proa Chum needed a school. Thompson contacted the Cambodian government and agreed to provide the funds for a school, requesting that it be named in his mother's honor. Early in 2008, Thompson announced the official opening of the Hun Sen Proa Chum Primary School in Phnom Penh.

Proa Chum Primary School

Thompson is a member of the International Advisory Board of the San Jose State University Business School and serves as the chairman of HKTDC (Hong Kong Trade Development Council) Logistics Services Advisory Committee (where he also served as a council member from 2002 to 2004). He also served as a board member of Ocean Park Corporation for six years, a nature-themed amusement park with a mission to assist in the understanding and practice of wildlife conservation. Although Thompson retired from this post in June 2009, Crown continues to support Ocean Park through a variety of charitable activities and services.

Thompson is also a non-executive director of the board of The Wharf (Holdings), a member of the Investment Promotion Ambassador Scheme, as well as the Hong Kong Trade and Industry Advisory Board (TIAB) and the ICAC (Independent Commission Against Corruption) Advisory Committee on Corruption. He also served two terms as chairman of the American Chamber of Commerce, Hong Kong from 2002 to 2003.

Additionally, Thompson serves as a member of the Hong Kong Forum and Vision 2047 which are organizations that actively discuss Hong Kong issues with visiting politicians, journalists and academics. He is also a member of the board of the Hong Kong-America Centre and has been a delegate representing Hong Kong on numerous Hong Kong Trade Development Council trade missions around the world.

Thompson is a member of the executive committee of the Society for the Promotion of Hospice Care, is an advisory board member of The Salvation Army and a trustee of Outward Bound Hong Kong. He currently chairs the annual Hike for Hospice charity event.

Thompson and his wife, Sally, are also very active in the Changing Young Lives Foundation and have chaired and organized several fund raising events. Formerly known as Save the Children Hong Kong, Changing Young Lives is a long-established charity organization based in Hong Kong, with a focus on helping children.

== Personal life ==
Thompson is a permanent resident of Hong Kong, where he has lived since 1978 with his wife Sally, who is a British national. Thompson's daughter Jennifer serves as Crown's Group CEO. She lives in New York City with her husband and three children. Thompson also has a son, James III, who has 3 daughters from a previous marriage.

Woodhouse Estate in Stradbally, Ireland was bought in 2012 by Thompson for €6.5m. He stated at the time that he intends to "throw himself into country living" and spend more time in Ireland.

Order of precedence
Preceded by Lawrence Fung; Recipients of the Gold Bauhinia Star	Hong Kong order of precedence Recipients of the Gold Bauhinia Star	Succeeded by Timothy Fok; Recipients of the Gold Bauhinia Star
