= Crown Worldwide Group =

Chinese logistics company

- Type: Privately owned
- Industry: Transportation, Relocation services, Logistics, Records Management, Warehouse Storage, Facilities Management, Art Installation, Corporate Moving, Interior fit-outs, Office Design
- Founded: 1965
- Founder: James E. Thompson
- Headquarters: Global/ APAC HQ; Hong Kong; Americas HQ; New York; EMEA HQ; London
- Area served: Worldwide over 270 locations, 53 countries
- Key people: James E. Thompson; Founder & Chairman; Ken Madrid; Group and APAC CEO; Kong Tze Shen; CEO ASIA; Barry Koolen; CEO EMEA; Jennifer Harvey; CEO Americas
- Number of employees: over 4,000 (2018)
- Divisions: Crown World Mobility; Crown Relocation; Crown Records Management; Crown Fine Art; Crown Workspace; Crown Logistics; Crown Wine Cellars
- Website: crownworldwide.com

Crown Worldwide Group is a privately owned multinational company headquartered in Hong Kong that provides a range of logistics and related services.

== Company overview ==
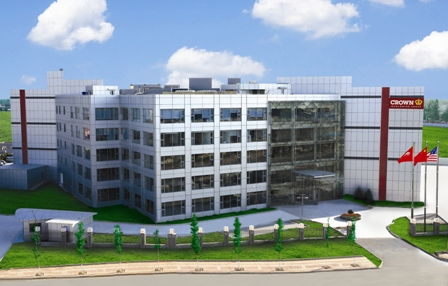
Crown Beijing, China

In 2018, Crown Worldwide Group generated revenue of approximately US$828 million, and owned assets of $736 million.

Operating more than 8.5 million square feet of warehouse space, one of the company's principal strategies is to continuously invest in new facilities. The Group includes: Crown World Mobility, Crown Relocations, Crown Records Management, Crown Fine Art, Crown Logistics, Crown Wine Cellars and the latest addition of Crown Workspace.

== History ==
Crown's first warehouse, 1965

In 1965, American Jim Thompson (then residing in Yokohama, Japan), recognized the need for an international moving service, so established Crown Worldwide Group. With $1,000 he established Transport Services International (as it was then known) in Yokohama with one office.

In 1970, the company expanded its operations into Hong Kong, followed by Singapore, Indonesia, Malaysia, and other Asia Pacific locations. By 1975, Transport Services International rebranded as Crown Pacific, solidifying its presence in Asia. In the early 1980s, the increased global mobility led to further expansion across America, Australasia, and Europe. These expansions were marked by the renaming of the company to Crown Worldwide Group.

Thompson is the founder and chairman. He graduated from San Jose State University with a Bachelor of Science degree in Aeronautical Engineering. He travelled to Asia shortly after graduation and has lived in Japan and Hong Kong ever since. Thompson is a U.S. citizen and a permanent resident of Hong Kong

In 2002, Jim Thompson, realized that there were no wine cellars in Asia. He made a proposal, to the Hong Kong Government to convert the Central Ordnance Munitions Depot into a commercial wine cellar, with a private members clubhouse and conservatory. After negotiating with 22 government departments and signing a seven-year lease, Crown Worldwide Group invested HKD 30 million ($3.8 million), and the Crown Wine Cellars opened in 2003. The Hong Kong wine cellars occupy four of 12 original pairs of bunkers. The clubhouse has three reception areas, two of which are located approximately twenty meters underground. They can accommodate approximately one hundred people for seated dinner events and over two hundred people for private cocktails functions.

Crown Wine Cellars has subsequently opened facilities in mainland China. The Hong Kong facility, located in a park-like setting in Shouson Hill, a suburb on Hong Kong Island, consists of two underground bunkers built by the British during World War II. Crown converted the bunkers and opened a private members' clubhouse.

=== Important milestones ===
In the 55 years that Crown has existed, it has reached and achieved many defining milestones.

Having previously provided transportation of two expositions for the Louvre Museum, Le Christ mort and Le Sacre de Napoléon. Crown Fine Art handled the relocation of the Mona Lisa in 2005.

The museum curator sought professional help removing the painting to change the frame and re-hang it. The Crown Fine Art team reported that although the Mona Lisa is a small painting, it is so well secured that it is actually heavy.

In April, 2007, to celebrate the 10th anniversary of the establishment of the Hong Kong SAR Government, China presented two young pandas to Hong Kong. Crown Relocations was involved in transporting the pandas to their new home in Ocean Park Hong Kong, a marine-based theme park located on the southern side of Hong Kong Island. The giant pandas arrived on 26 April 2007, and were unveiled to the public on 1 July, the 10th anniversary of the Hong Kong SAR government.

More recently, the newest brand of the Group, Crown Workspace has seen a massive rise since its launch and in 2018 Workspace saw the acquisitions of Fusion Workplace Services and Premier Workplace Services.

Crown Fine Art supported the Rijksmuseum in the start of Operation Night Watch by moving Rembrandt's The Night Watch painting for the third time. Being the biggest and most wide-ranging research and conservation project in the history of Rembrandt's masterpiece, the move, led by the Rijksmuseum alongside Crown Fine Art experts, is the first since 11 December 2003, when Crown Fine Art successfully moved the painting to the Philips Wing in the Rijksmuseum for the museum's ten-year renovation.

== Brands and marques ==
Crown truck featuring the company's red and yellow colours

=== Brands ===
- Crown World Mobility – provides corporate relocation services for companies moving employees internationally or domestically.
- Crown Relocations – provides removal and transportation services to assist people relocating both internationally and domestically. Crown Relocations also provide services to support other aspects of a relocation, such as obtaining visas, family support and purchasing real estate in a customer's new home.
- Crown Information Management – provides information management, document storage, management, destruction of records and consolation, to organizations in over 40 countries throughout the world.
- Crown Fine Art – provides transportation, installation and storage services for fine art that require special handling to museums, private collectors, art exhibitions etc.
- Crown Workspace – provides office design services, interior fit-outs and commercial office relocations.
- Crown Logistics – provides international freight forwarding, logistics for furniture fixtures and equipment and the hotel and oil and gas industries.
- Crown Wine Cellars – offers wine storage and handling at facilities in Hong Kong and mainland China.

=== Marques ===
Generally, in 1970 commercial trucks in Hong Kong were red and black, so Crown Pacific adopted these colors, featuring on the company business cards. Over time, more emphasis was placed on the red and the crown symbol was always visible on the logo.

Today, the company uses the Crown name and specified logo, with the tag of its various services.
