= Shouson Hill =

Hill in Southern District, Hong Kong

- 壽臣山
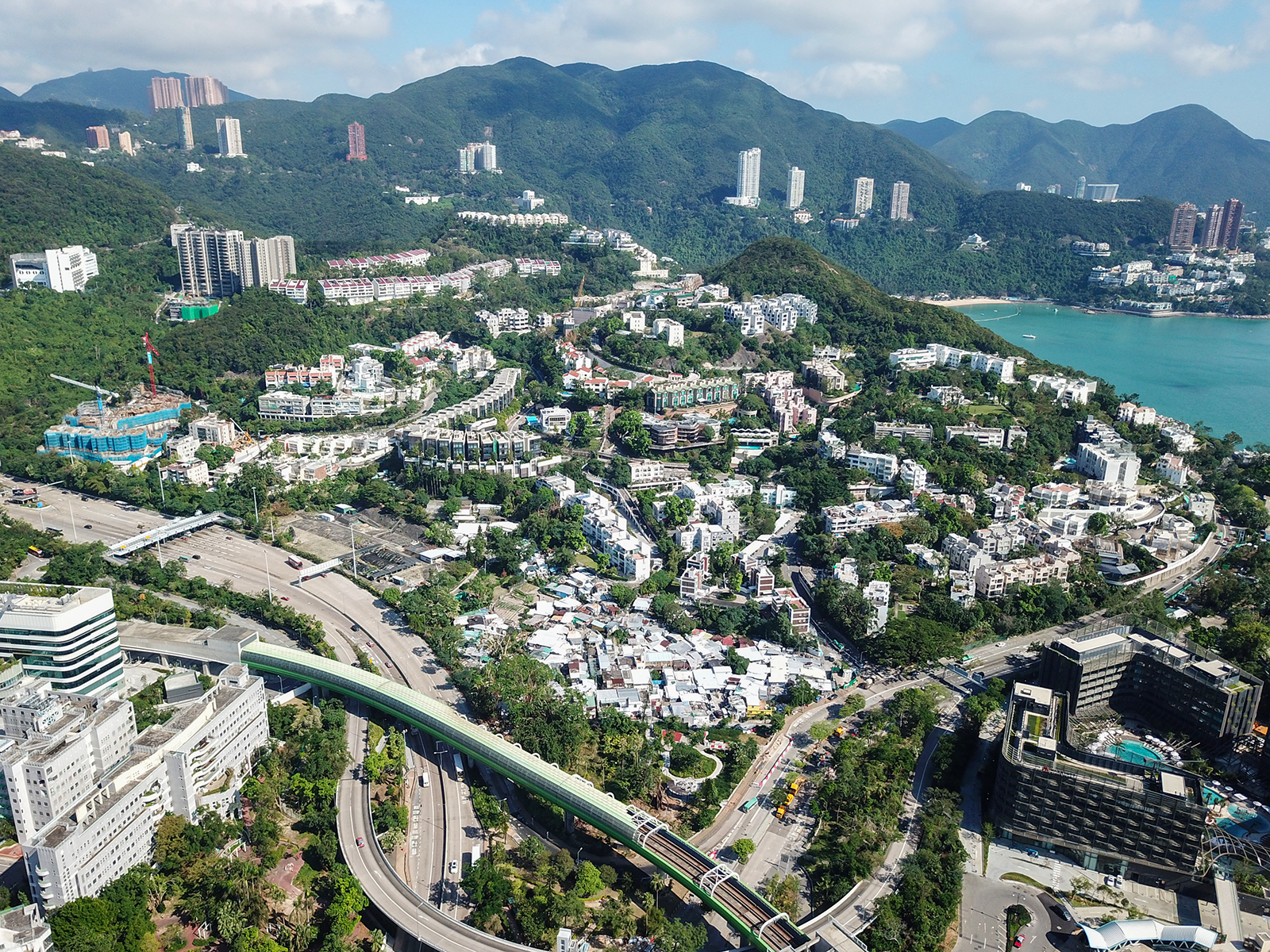
- View of Shouson Hill

Highest point
- Elevation: 148 m (486 ft)
- Coordinates: 22°14′54″N 114°10′49″E

Geography
- Location within Hong Kong
- Location: Hong Kong

Shouson Hill
- Traditional Chinese: 壽臣山
- Simplified Chinese: 寿臣山
Transcriptions
Standard Mandarin
- Hanyu Pinyin: Shòuchén Shān
Yue: Cantonese
- Jyutping: sau6 san4 saan1

Shouson Hill (Chinese: 壽臣山) is a hill (148 m high) on the coast of Deep Water Bay east of Wong Chuk Hang, in Southern District, on Hong Kong Island in Hong Kong.

North of the hill is an affluent residential area, which consists primarily of Shouson Hill Road, a loop off the main Wong Chuk Hang Road, together with a few side roads.

== Name ==
The hill is named after Chow Shouson, who was born in the village and became a senior official in the Qing dynasty before the 1911 Revolution and then an active businessman and politician in Hong Kong.

== History ==
The valley north of Shouson Hill was formerly a cultivated area containing a walled village. It has also been known as Wong Chuk Hang Valley and Staunton's Valley.

In the early 20th century, the British military used the hill to bunker troops and as a sentry post overlooking Deep Water Bay, Aberdeen, and area now occupied by Ocean Park. The bunkers are now abandoned and run down. During World War II, locals were evacuated to the area to avoid Japanese air assault.

== Geography ==
Shouson Hill comprises two sections: The West and South Nursery. The area slopes steeply to Deep Water Bay and gradually towards Aberdeen. Loose gravel and steep slopes make it prone to landslides during heavy rain that occasionally require the closure of sections of road. Vegetation covers nearly three-quarters of the hill, with species including mandarin shrubs, mangrove trees, palm trees and some coniferous forest trees. Fauna includes black kites, snakes, lizards and estuary birds.

== Local services ==
Local bus service includes the #5 Public Light Bus, between Aberdeen and Causeway Bay.

- Green Minibus No.5:Aberdeen ↔ Causeway Bay (via Shouson Hill, Happy Valley)

MTR South Island line Ocean Park station exit C is also located at the foot of the hill.

The lower parts of Shouson Hill Road and Shouson Hill Road West are a 10 to 15-minute walk to various bus services to city centre destinations such as Causeway Bay, Central and North Point. Other destinations include Repulse Bay and Stanley.

Shopping opportunities are limited to Shouson Place which includes a supermarket.

== Education ==
Shouson Hill is in Primary One Admission (POA) School Net 18. Within the school net are multiple aided schools (operated independently but funded with government money) and Hong Kong Southern District Government Primary School.

== See also ==
- Wong Chuk Hang San Wai
- Central Ordnance Munitions Depot
