= Central Ordnance Munitions Depot =

Coordinates: 22.2529°N 114.18345°E

- 壽臣山軍火庫
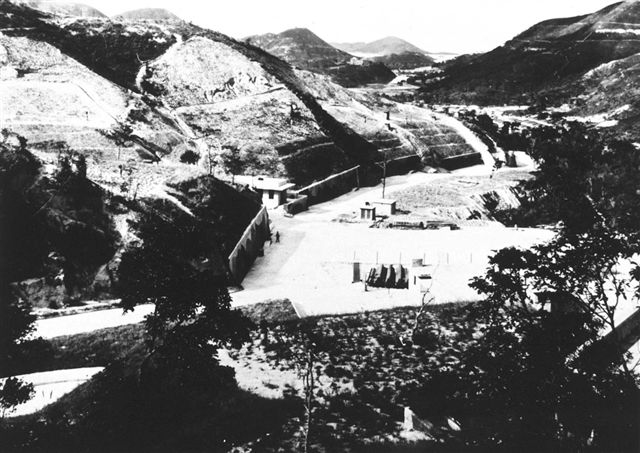
- External view of the munitions depot in 1941
- Interactive map of the Central Ordnance Munitions Depot area
- Alternative names: "Little Hong Kong"; Central Ordnance (Munitions) Depot

General information
- Type: bunker, munitions dump
- Location: Shouson Hill, Hong Kong
- Current tenants: Crown Wine Cellars
- Completed: 1937
- Renovated: March 2004
- Renovation cost: HK$30 million
- Landlord: Government of Hong Kong

Renovating team
- Awards: 2007 Award of Merit of the UNESCO Asia-Pacific Heritage Awards for Culture Heritage Conservation

Central Ordnance Munitions Depot
- Traditional Chinese: 壽臣山軍火庫
- Simplified Chinese: 寿臣山军火库
- Literal meaning: Shouson Hill Arsenal
Transcriptions
Standard Mandarin
- Hanyu Pinyin: Shòuchén Shān Jūnhuǒkù
Yue: Cantonese
- Yale Romanization: Sauh sàhn sāan gwān fó fu
- Jyutping: Sau6 san4 saan1 gwan1 fo2 fu3

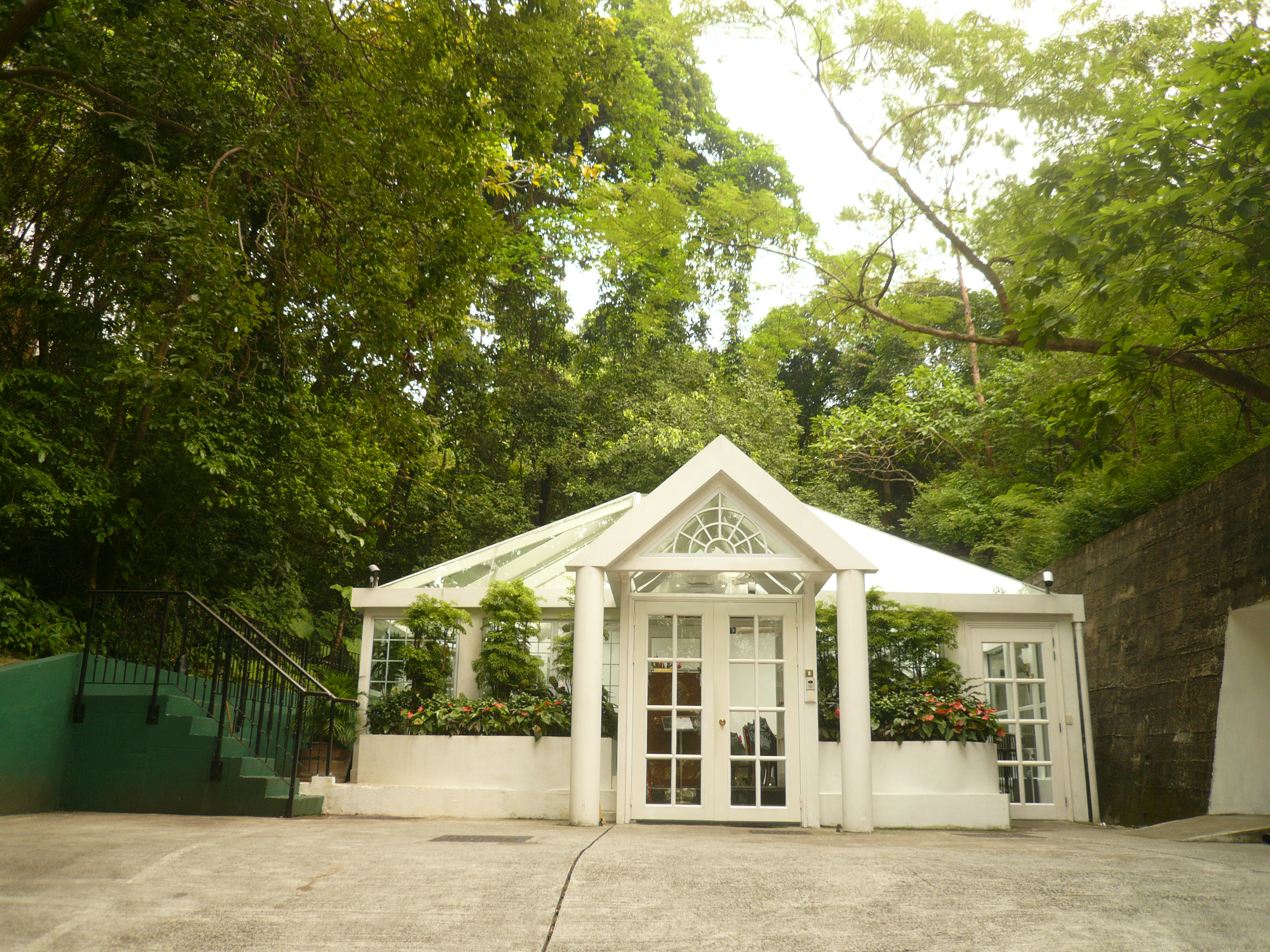
The Crown Wine Cellars is located in Shouson Hill, suburb of Hong Kong Island.

The Central Ordnance Munitions Depot was constructed in the late 1930s by British for the World War II to combat the Japanese Invasion as well as to store arms and ammunition for the defence of Hong Kong. The British used "Little Hong Kong", name for the fishing village town of Aberdeen, as a "code name" to refer to the military site and therefore confuse Japanese spies in the local community before the Japanese invasion.

Following a successful proposal made to the Government of Hong Kong for a commercial adaptive reuse of the underground bunkers in 2002, the Central Ordnance Munitions Depot has been renovated to become wine cellars. This revitalisation project won one of the four Awards of Merit of the 2007 UNESCO Asia-Pacific Heritage Awards for Culture Heritage Conservation.

== History ==
The Central Ordnance Munitions Depot was established in 1937 by the British Royal Engineers in preparation for the Second World War to combat the Japanese Invasion, and served as a secure military facility for ammunition and weapon storage. It was composed of 12 pairs of underground bunkers, a depot headquarters and a sentry box.

The original structures were constructed by the British military to serve as an ammunition and weapons storage depot in preparation for World War II. The site was originally known as the Central Ordnance (Munitions) Depot, and included 24 underground Bunkers, of which only 8 remain. Owing to their intended purpose, the Bunkers are located approximately 20 meters below ground with 1-meter thick concrete walls and 12-meter long entrance passages.

=== Architecture and construction ===
The overall site of Central Ordnance Munitions Depot measures approximately 820 feet (250 m) in width and 1,970 feet (600 m)in length. Before its destruction, the facility comprised 12 pairs of underground bunkers, a Depot headquarters building and a sentry box at the Western corner of the area.

Each bunker has been created in a similar design including an entrance corridor measuring 31 feet (9.4 m), an internal width of 24 feet (7.3 m) and a length of 40 feet (12.2 m), the only difference that some bunkers have is that they have an extra (false) brick wall inner-lining against the 1 meter thick wall since they had been planned for high explosive. The reason for this false wall's construction is to reduce the potential impact of an internal explosion.

The corridors are angled in an S-shape to turn aside the explosion wave of a possible burst of munitions. In addition, there are channels built into the corridor walls inclining from ceiling to floor at 45-degree angles. The purpose of these channels' construction is to capture the blast wave of a burst and force them to descend onto the corridor floor at 90-degree angles to the side walls thus preventing the blast waves from exiting the passageways.

A second smaller corridor which measures 1.25 meters in height and 50 cm in width can be found at the entrance to the bunker cavity. This smaller corridor travels around the outer wall of the bunkers thus creating a moisture trap which is essential as the bunkers are located under the water table for most of the year. This design of bunkers allows the inner concrete walls to stay free from being humid and therefore keeping armaments and ammunition dry.

A pair of 1.27 cm thick steel entrance door which opens up into the bunker area measures approximately 3.3 meters from the ground floor to the lowest point of the ceiling. The ceiling features rugged, wave-like design that rises and falls around 40 cm and it is covered in steel. This design is used again to minimise the effect of possible explosion and to benefit blast wave deflection.

Inside of the bunkers, escape hatch measuring one meter in diameters runs horizontally for 5 meters and then perpendicularly until the surface on the top of the bunkers. The metal structure and additional brick has been constructed on the slope to make escape easy under possible explosion or fire. In addition, "breather pipe" has been built to open up into a hidden structure above the slope for the case in which the troops be trapped inside of the bunkers.

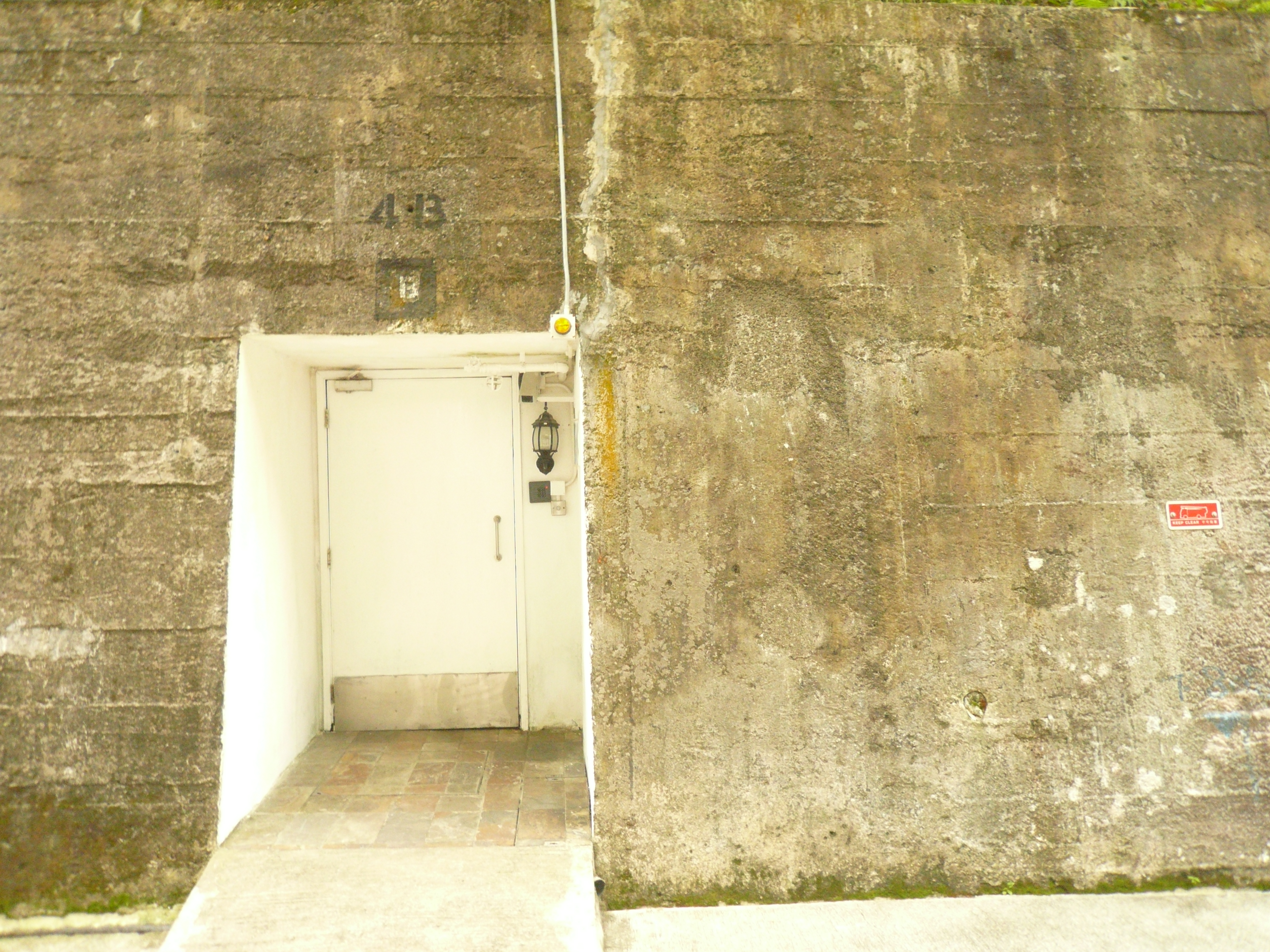
One of the bunkers that is located outside the Crown Wine Cellars that can no longer be used.

=== Japanese invasion ===
It was believed that the British military chose the site to keep it a secret since there were many Japanese spies in the local communities before the Japanese invasion. The local fishing village of Aberdeen was located about 5 km away and is known as "Little Hong Kong" in Cantonese. The British used this version as a "code name" to refer to the military site and thus confuse those spying for the Japanese.

In December 1941, Little Hong Kong was manned by some 60 soldiers of four different nationalities, and reinforced by RN sailors from damaged ships, particularly the destroyer, HMS Thracian. Among these were soldiers from Royal Army Ordnance Corps, Royal Army Service Corps, and Royal Engineers. There were also five soldiers from the Winnipeg Grenadiers; 14 local Chinese uniformed soldiers of the Hong Kong Volunteer Defence Corps, 18 men from the Middlesex Regiment, as well as Punjabi infantrymen from pre-partition India. It was the last place to surrender during the Battle of Hong Kong, which lasted 18 days and ended with the British colony being taken by the Japanese army.

Two days after Hong Kong officially surrendered on 25 December 1941, the Japanese commander became aware that the munitions depot Little Hong Kong was still under the control of the British. The Japanese could either attack and stand the chance of losing more soldiers or negotiate. Since the bunkers were almost impervious to attack and there was sufficient food, water and ammunition for defence, Major Dewar, the British commander, resisted with a defiant message. Captain Suzuki was sent by the Japanese commander to negotiate the surrender. Upon learning that Dewar had wired up all the 24 bunkers to a central detonator, the Japanese captain agreed to an honorable surrender on 27 December 1941.

What happened after the surrender was recorded by a British man Lewis Bush. He was the translator used by the Japanese Army. Bush later wrote in his diary about how the Japanese treated the surrendering troops "like heroes". They were taken down to Aberdeen where a "Japanese officer arrived with beer and whisky in plenty". The Japanese then occupied the site until Hong Kong was liberated in August 1945, during which time it is believed that the Japanese constructed the current guard house.

=== Post-War ===
The British military ceased its use of the site in 1977. Control was transferred to the Hong Kong Police Driving School until the early 1980s. At least four pairs of the bunkers were destroyed in the mid-1980s as a result of the development of two residential apartments.

Starting in the mid-1980s, Hong Kong Geotechnical Engineering Office used the remaining bunkers to store rock core samples. In 2000, the government put forward a partnership proposal to invite private sectors for the revitalisation of discarded military sites in Hong Kong.

== Preservation and restoration ==
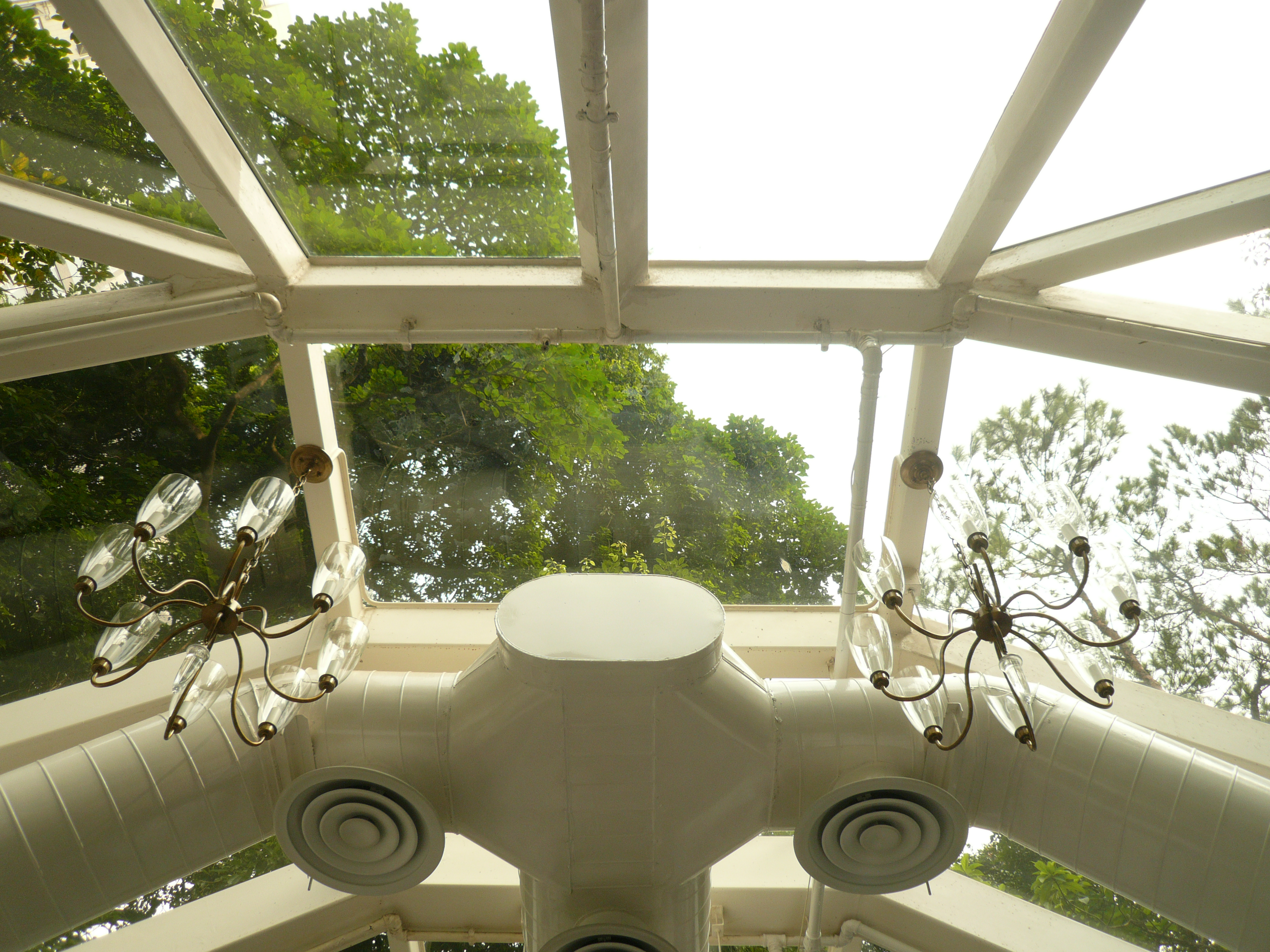
Crown Worldwide spent approximately 30 million Hong Kong dollars on the restoration and construction of Crown Wine Cellars.

Little Hong Kong's historical significance was long forgotten and the site fell into disrepair until the Government of Hong Kong, under the guidance of the (then) Chief Secretary Donald Tsang, called for the private restoration in 2000.

In 2002, Jim Thompson and Gregory De’eb of Crown Worldwide Group realised that there were no wine cellars in Asia, put forward a proposal to the Government with an innovative commercial adaptive re-use of the underground bunkers. They proposed to convert the munitions depot into a commercial wine cellar, with a private members clubhouse and conservatory. After negotiating with 22 government departments and signing a seven-year lease, Crown invested 30 million Hong Kong dollars (US$3.8 million). Before the restoration, exhaustive consultation processes were undertaken which included more than twenty Government departments and divisions, the Antiquities and Monuments Office, District Council, local and international historians and local residents. Having obtained positive input and approval of all stakeholders, restoration began in August 2003 and lasted until March 2004. The 'Crown Wine Cellars' opened in 2003.

The major objective of the restoration is to ensure its long-term survival through sustainable and compatible business practices, and create a living museum to educate and commemorate the history of Hong Kong against the Japanese invasion in World War II. To ensure the maximum number of interested parties could experience these facilities and be educated about the Battle of Hong Kong and its part in the greater Sino-Japanese conflict, two of the eight remaining bunkers were complemented by a period style conservatory and turned into a clubhouse.

The UNESCO presented an Award of Merit to Little Hong Kong in the year 2007.
