= Stanley Peninsula =

Peninsula in Hong Kong

Coordinates: 22.2003°N 114.2166°E

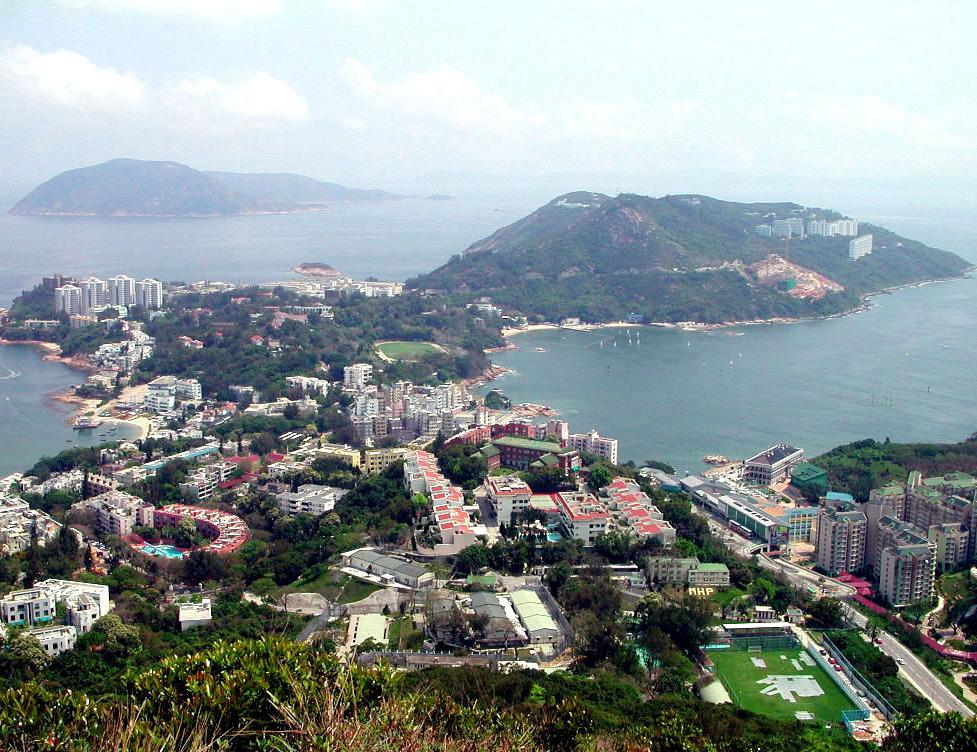
Stanley and Stanley Peninsula.

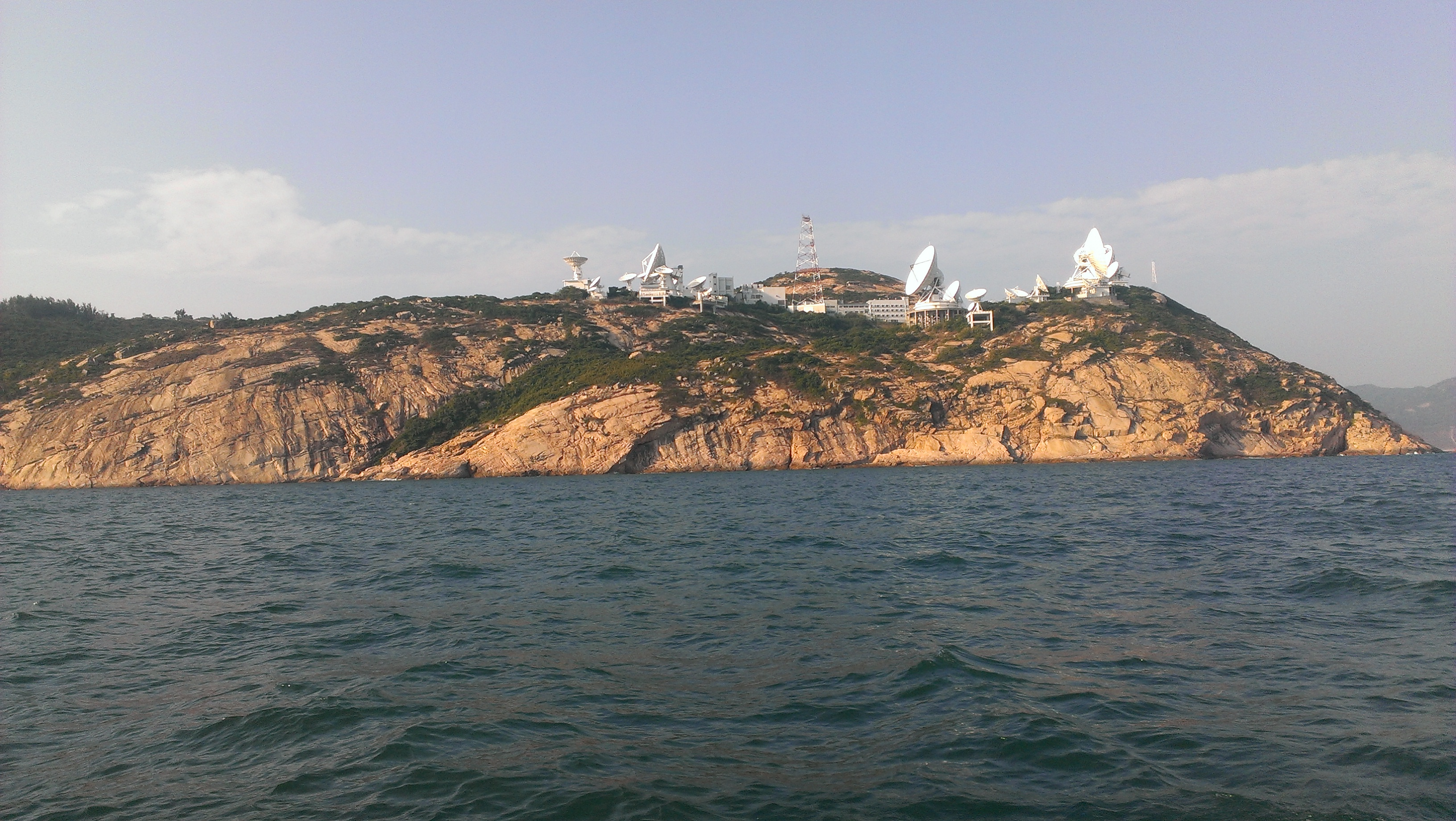
AsiaSat's Stanley Earth Station, near the southern tip of Stanley Peninsula.

Stanley Peninsula (Chinese: 赤柱半島), formerly known as Tai Tam Peninsula (大潭半島), is a peninsula of southern Hong Kong Island in Hong Kong. Located between Tai Tam Bay and Stanley Bay, it joins north to Hong Kong Island at the town of Stanley and ends to the south at Bluff Head (黃麻角, Wong Ma Kok)‌.

== Climate ==
Climate data for Bluff Head (1995–2016)
Month	Jan	Feb	Mar	Apr	May	Jun	Jul	Aug	Sep	Oct	Nov	Dec	Year
Mean daily maximum °C (°F)	18.8 (65.8)	19.4 (66.9)	21.0 (69.8)	24.8 (76.6)	28.6 (83.5)	30.5 (86.9)	31.5 (88.7)	31.2 (88.2)	30.4 (86.7)	28.1 (82.6)	25.1 (77.2)	20.8 (69.4)	25.8 (78.4)
Daily mean °C (°F)	15.3 (59.5)	16.1 (61.0)	17.9 (64.2)	21.7 (71.1)	25.4 (77.7)	27.4 (81.3)	28.1 (82.6)	27.9 (82.2)	27.1 (80.8)	24.9 (76.8)	21.7 (71.1)	17.4 (63.3)	22.6 (72.7)
Mean daily minimum °C (°F)	13.2 (55.8)	14.1 (57.4)	15.9 (60.6)	19.6 (67.3)	23.4 (74.1)	25.3 (77.5)	25.7 (78.3)	25.5 (77.9)	25.1 (77.2)	22.9 (73.2)	19.7 (67.5)	15.1 (59.2)	20.5 (68.9)
Source: Hong Kong Observatory

== Transport ==
The main road in Stanley Peninsula is Wong Ma Kok Road.
