= Hairpin Beach =

Beach in Hong Kong Island, Hong Kong

- Beach
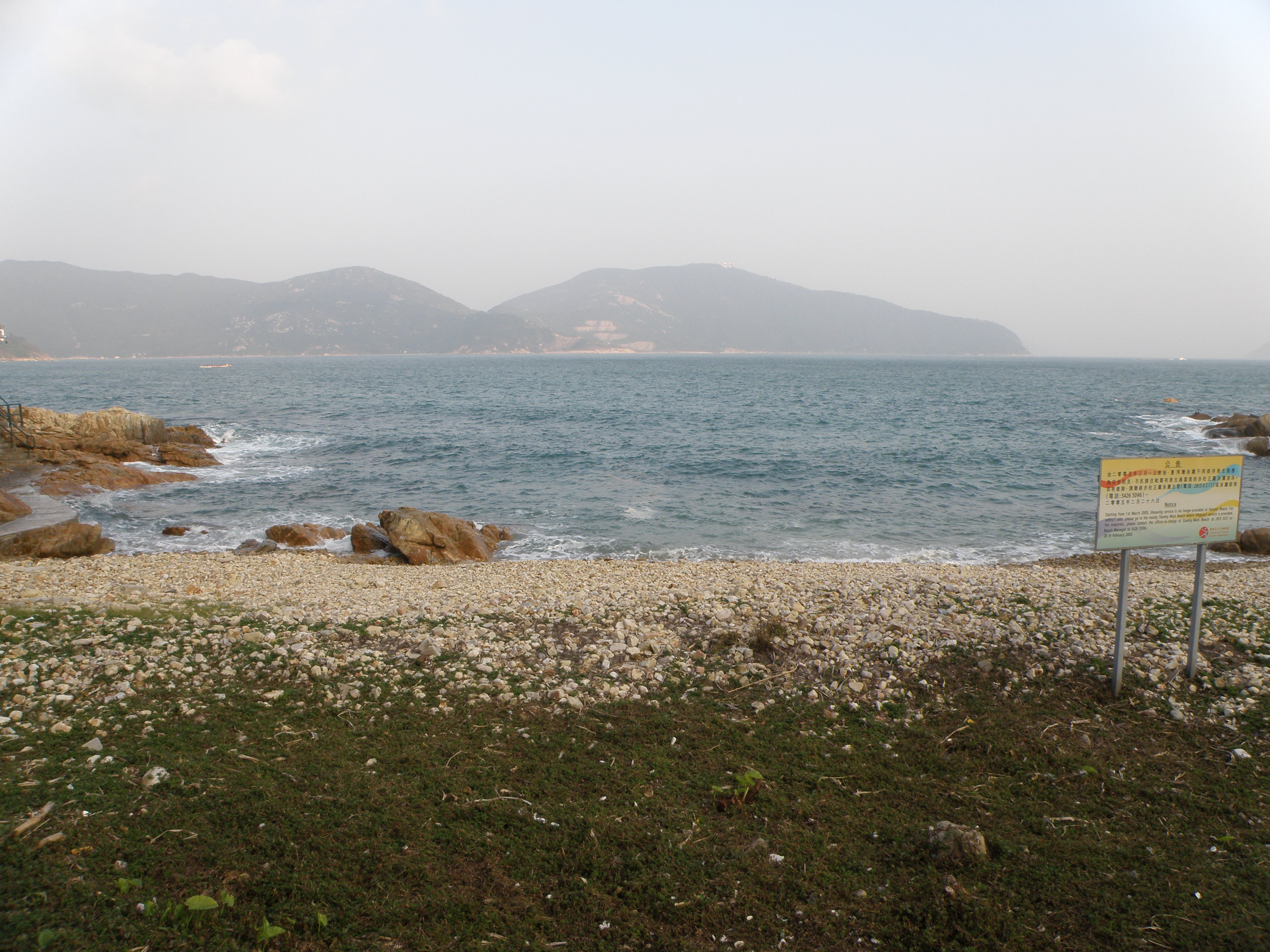
- Hairpin Beach

- Coordinates: 22.22423°N 114.21485°E
- Location: Stanley, Hong Kong Island
- Patrolled by: Leisure and Cultural Services Department

Hairpin Beach
- Traditional Chinese: 夏萍灣泳灘
- Simplified Chinese: 夏萍湾泳滩
Transcriptions
Standard Mandarin
- Hanyu Pinyin: Xià Píng Wān Yǒng Tān
Yue: Cantonese
- Jyutping: haa6 ping4 waan1 wing6 taan1

Hairpin Beach or Hair Pin Beach is a gazetted beach located north of Stanley Main Beach in the eastern coast of Stanley peninsula, Southern District, Hong Kong. The beach has barbecue pits and is managed by the Leisure and Cultural Services Department of the Hong Kong Government. The beach did not get its grading and it is currently not open for swimming as no lifeguard facilities are available. The beach offers views of Shek O Peak as well as D'Aguilar Peak.

== History ==
On 1 July 2000, the beach was affected by oil pollution and was ordered to close by the Leisure and Cultural Services Department (LCSD). Later, the Environmental Protection Department believed that the local water quality had reached the standard for swimming again the next day and the beach was reopened to the public that day. Subsequently, the local water quality continued to improve. For example, it was maintained at a normal to good level in early October 2004 and later remained at a good level every year.

On 13 July 2016, a body of a woman was found floating in the waters 100 metres off the beach. The police boat arrived at the scene to search, then recovered her and then transferred her back to Marine Police Aberdeen Base. Although the Hong Kong Police Force was unable to seize any identity documents on her body, after preliminary investigations, it was believed that the case was not suspicious.

== Usage ==
The beach has always been low in number of users due to its small scale. For example, in the winter of 2002, only one citizen used it every day on average. In view of this, the Leisure and Cultural Services Department ceased to provide lifeguard services at the beach on 1 March 2005, so the beach is no longer open to the public for swimming.

== Facilities ==
The beach has the following features:

- BBQ pits (22 nos.)
- Showers
- Toilets

== See also ==
- Beaches of Hong Kong
