= St. Stephen's Beach =

Beach in Hong Kong

Coordinates: 22.2130°N 114.2148°E

- Beach
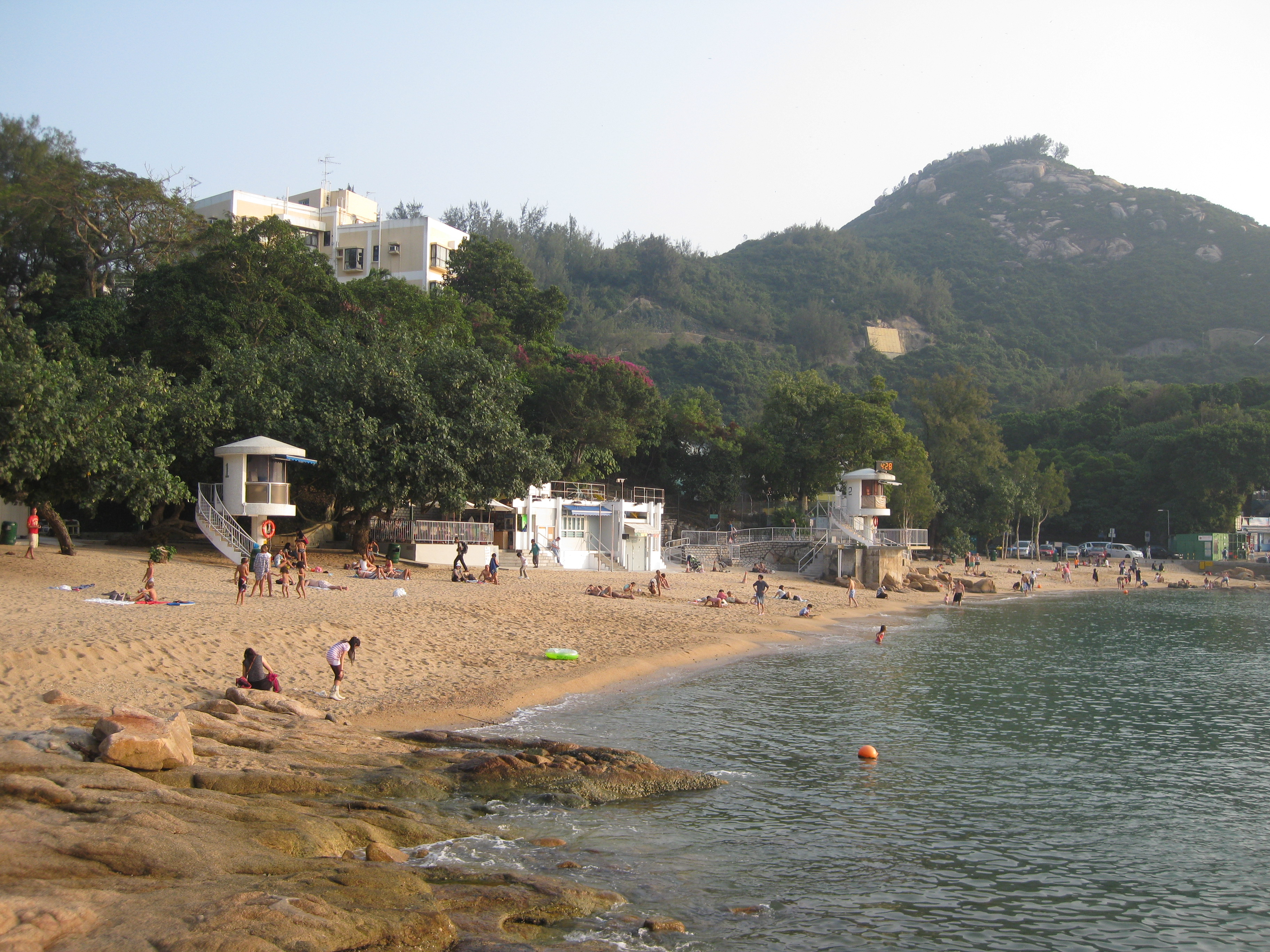
- Overview
- Location: Stanley, Hong Kong Island
- Patrolled by: Leisure and Cultural Services Department

St. Stephen's Beach
- Traditional Chinese: 聖士提反灣沙灘
- Simplified Chinese: 圣士提反湾沙滩
Transcriptions
Standard Mandarin
- Hanyu Pinyin: Shèng Shìtífǎn Wān Yǒng Tān
Yue: Cantonese
- Jyutping: sing3 si6 tai4 faan2 waan1 wing6 taan1

St. Stephen's Beach (Chinese: 聖士提反灣泳灘) is a secluded beach in the Southern District of Hong Kong, five minutes from Stanley Main Beach, and close to St. Stephen's College Preparatory School. The beach has barbecue pits. It is managed by the Leisure and Cultural Services Department and is rated as Grade 1 by the Environmental Protection Department for its water quality.

== History ==
New beach facilities were opened by the Urban Council on 26 August 1966. A beach building was constructed with changing rooms, toilets and showers, a tuck shop, a catamaran store, a first aid post, and a picnic area with tables and chairs. An old pier was also rebuilt at the same time.

== Features ==
- BBQ pits (14 nos.)
- Changing rooms
- Showers
- Toilets
- Tuck shop
- Water sports centre

== See also ==
- Beaches of Hong Kong
