= Tai Tam Harbour =

Harbour in Tai Tam Bay in Hong Kong

Coordinates: 22.23699°N 114.23120°E

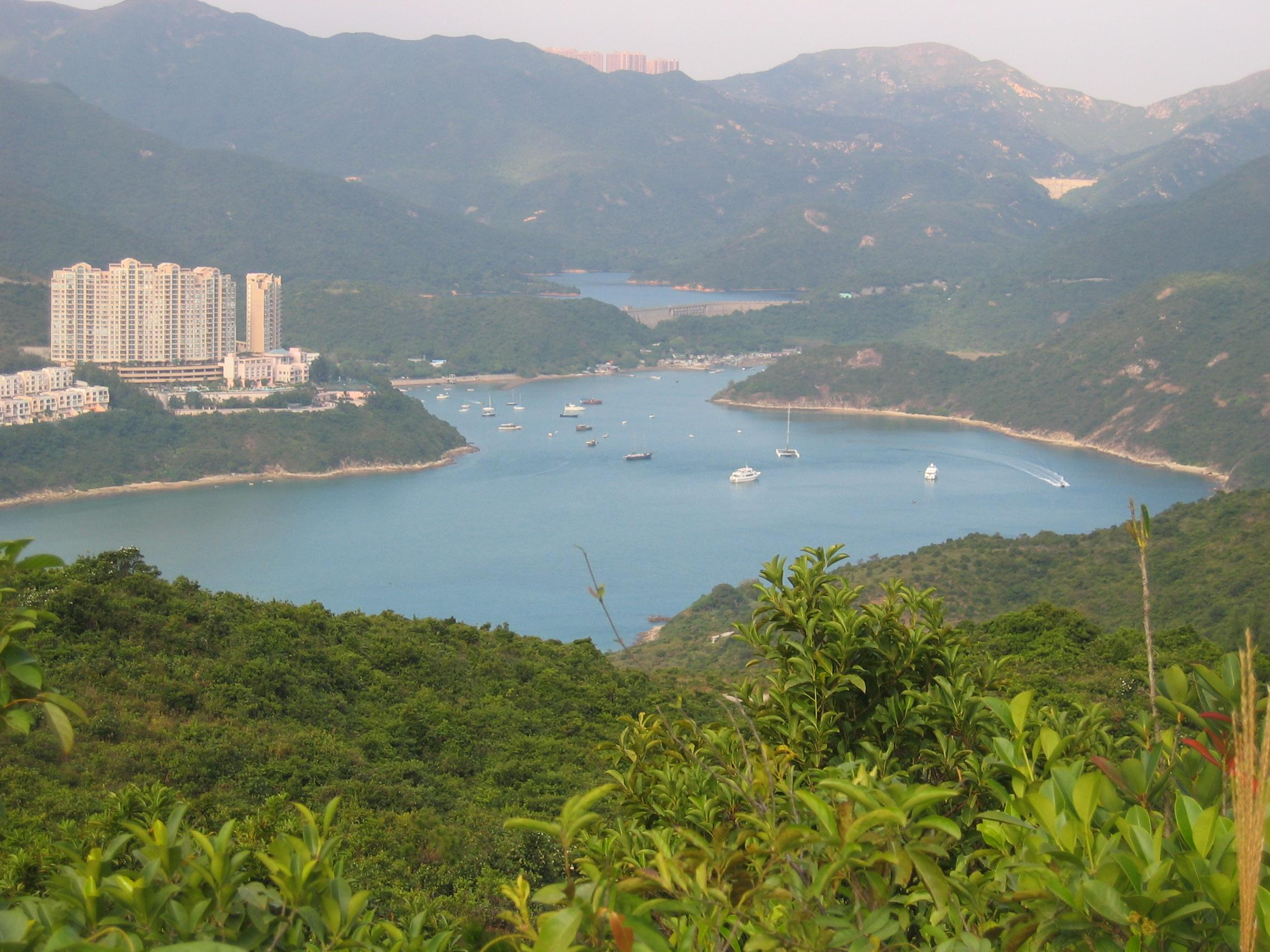
Tai Tam Harbour, looking toward its inner bay in the northwest. Redhill Peninsula is visible on the left. Tai Tam Tuk Reservoir is visible in the background (centre).

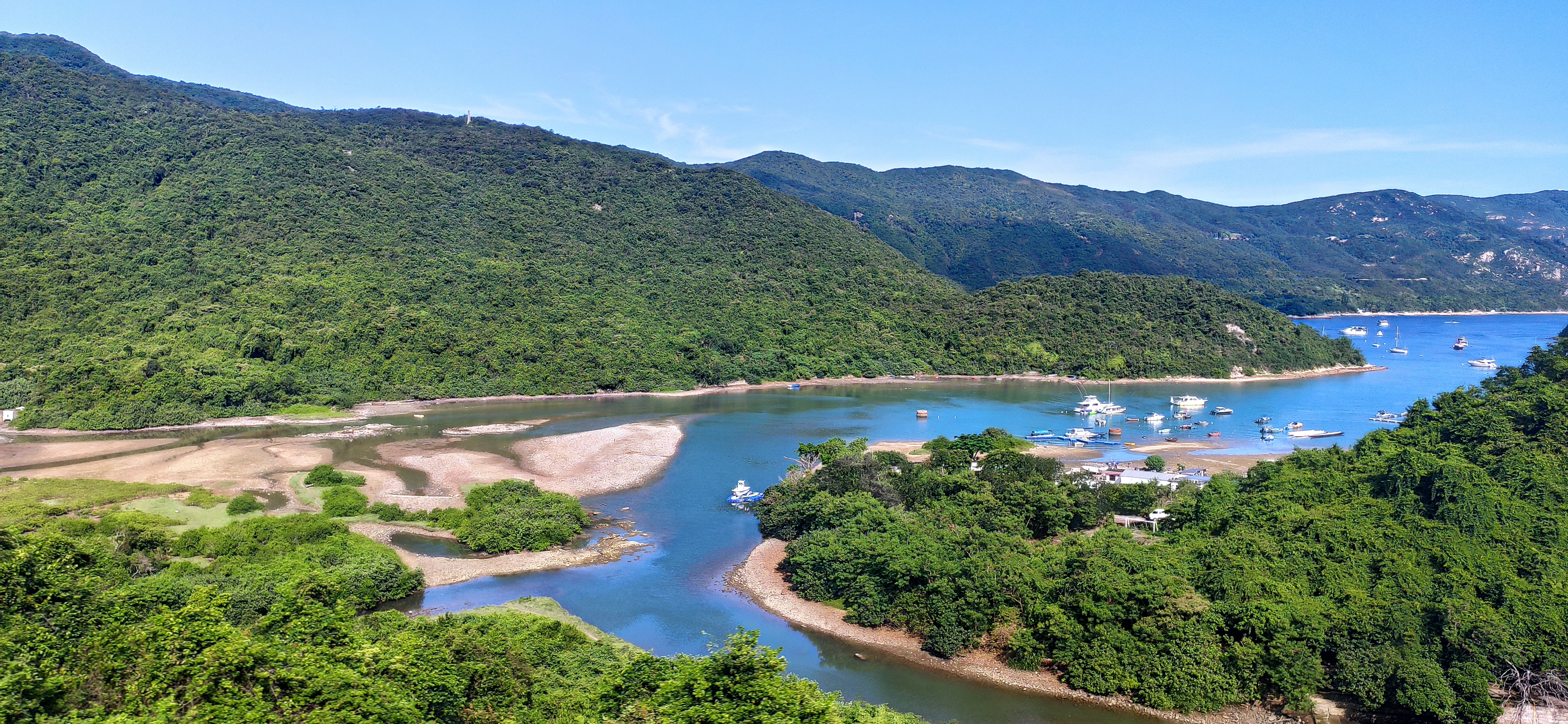
Inner bay (northwest) of Tai Tam Harbour.

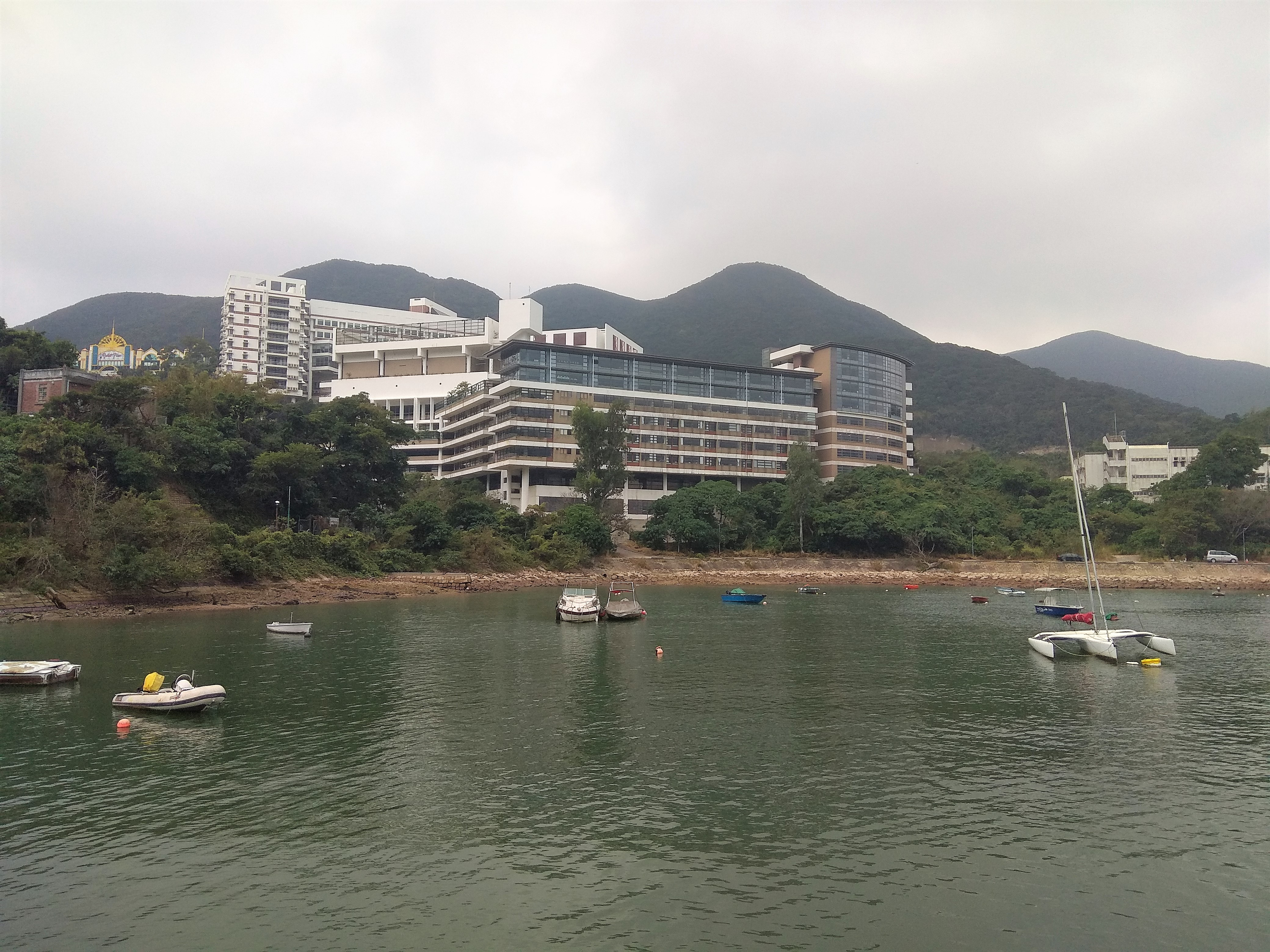
Hong Kong International School and Tai Tam Scout Centre (right) by shore of Tai Tam Harbour.

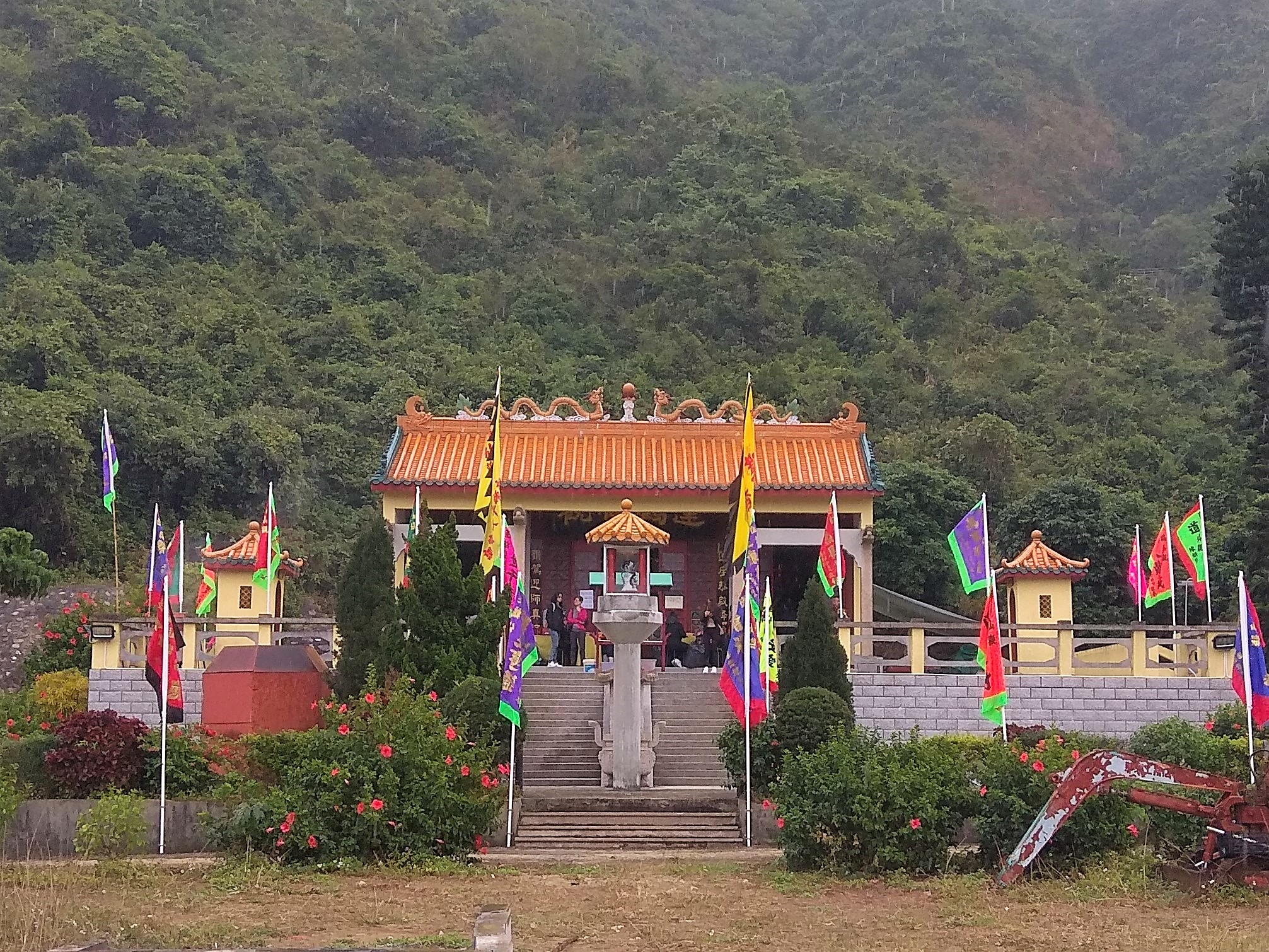
Lin Hok Sin Koon at Lan Nai Wan.

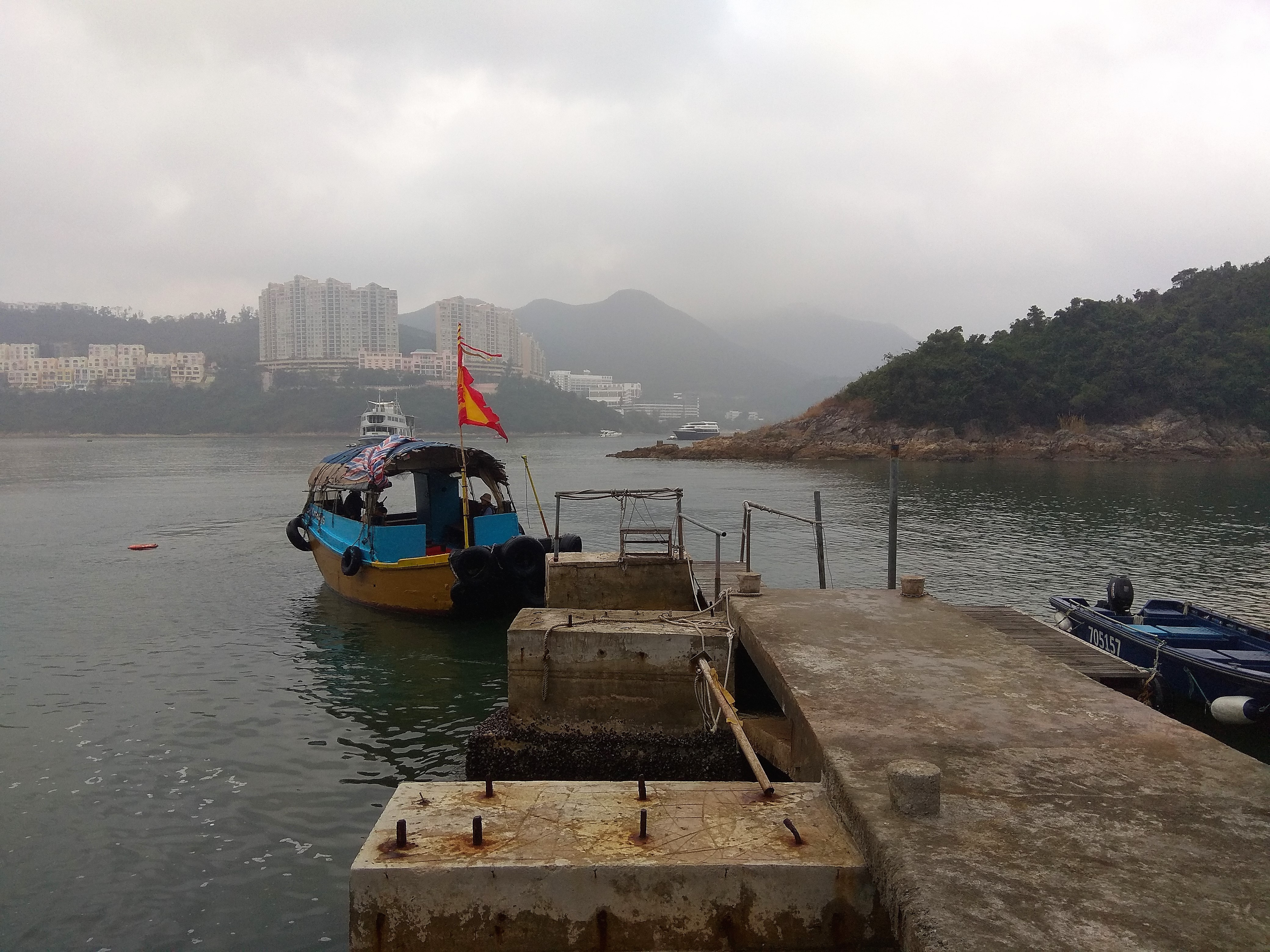
View of Tai Tam Harbour and Redhill Peninsula from the public pier next to Lin Hok Sin Koon.

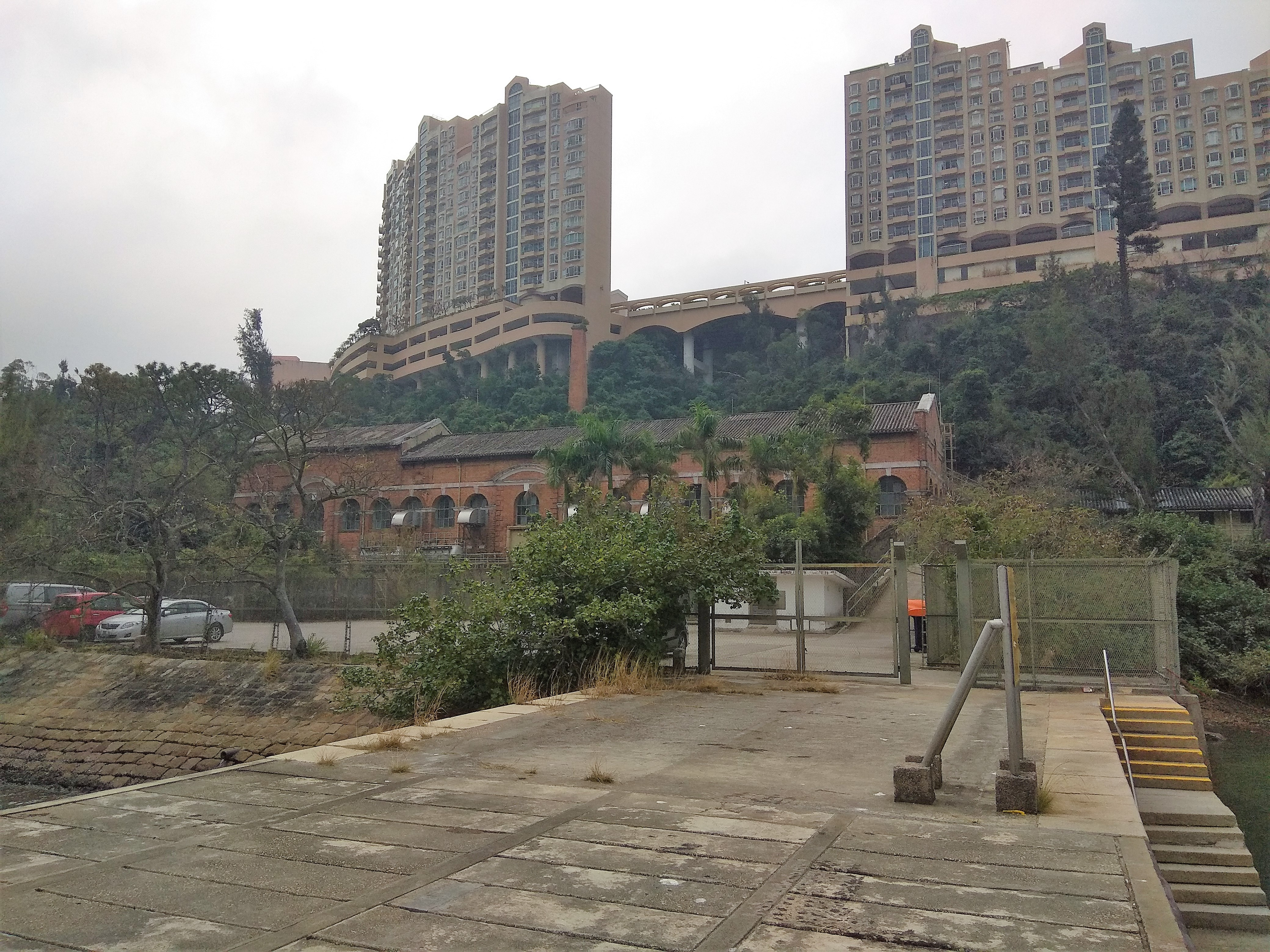
Tai Tam Bay Pier (大潭灣碼頭), a public pier next to Tai Tam Tuk Raw Water Pumping Station.

Tai Tam Harbour (Chinese: 大潭港) is a harbour in the innermost part of Tai Tam Bay in the southeastern part of Hong Kong Island, in the Southern District of Hong Kong. It is located at the estuary of Tai Tam Tuk.

== Geography ==
Tai Tam Harbour is a narrow inlet to the inner bay area of Tai Tam Bay, in the south of Hong Kong Island. The harbour is about 200 m wide and 2km long, with an avaregae depth of about 3 m.

== History ==
The harbour was once a gathering water of Tanka boat people.

== Settlements ==
The southwestern part of the harbour is formed by a round-shaped peninsula, where the Red Hill and several low-rise upmarket residences and private housing estates are located, including the Redhill Peninsula, Red Hill Park (紅山花園), Turtle Cove (龜背灣), Le Palais (皇府灣) and Villa Rosa (玫瑰園).

Tai Tam Tuk Village (大潭篤村), resited after the construction of Tai Tam Tuk Reservoir, is located at the estuary by the harbour, along the western shore of the northwest inner bay of Tai Tam Harbour.

Five villages are located along the western coast of Tai Tam Harbour. Form north to south: Lan Nai Wan Village (爛泥灣村), Tung Ah Village (東丫村), Tung Ah Pui Village (東丫背村), Ngan Hang Village (銀坑村) and To Tei Wan Village (土地灣村). They are collectively known as 'The Five Lan Nai Wan Villages'.

At the time of the 1911 census, the population of Tai Tam Tuk was 76, the population of Lan Nai Wan was 4, the population of To Tei Wan was 54.

== Features ==
Lan Nai Wan (爛泥灣; 'bad soil bay') is bay in the west of Tai Tam Harbour. It is the site of Lan Nai Wan Village and Lin Hok Sin Koon (蓮鶴仙觀) temple.

Remains of military installations, including lookouts and pillboxes can be found among the Five Lan Nai Wan Villages.

Hong Kong International School has a campus by the western shore of Tai Tam Harbour, next to the Tai Tam Scout Centre. Five structures related to the Tai Tam Tuk Raw Water Pumping Station are also located in the vicinity, namely, the pumping station building, its chimney shaft, two staff quarters and the senior staff quarters. These 5 structures are collectively declared monuments as part of the "22 Historic Structures of Tai Tam Group of Reservoirs".

Section 7 of the Hong Kong Trail, from Tai Tam Road to To Tei Wan, follows the northern and western outline of Tai Tam Harbour.

== Nature ==
Part of the estuary is fully of mangrove.

The inner bay (northwest) of Tai Tam Harbour has been designated as a Site of Special Scientific Interest since 1975.
