= Stanley Bay =

Stanley Bay may refer to:

- Stanley Bay, Hong Kong
- Stanley Bay, New Zealand
- Stanley (neighborhood), Alexandria, Egypt
