= Tai Tam Bay =

Bay in Hong Kong

Coordinates: 22.21756°N 114.22996°E

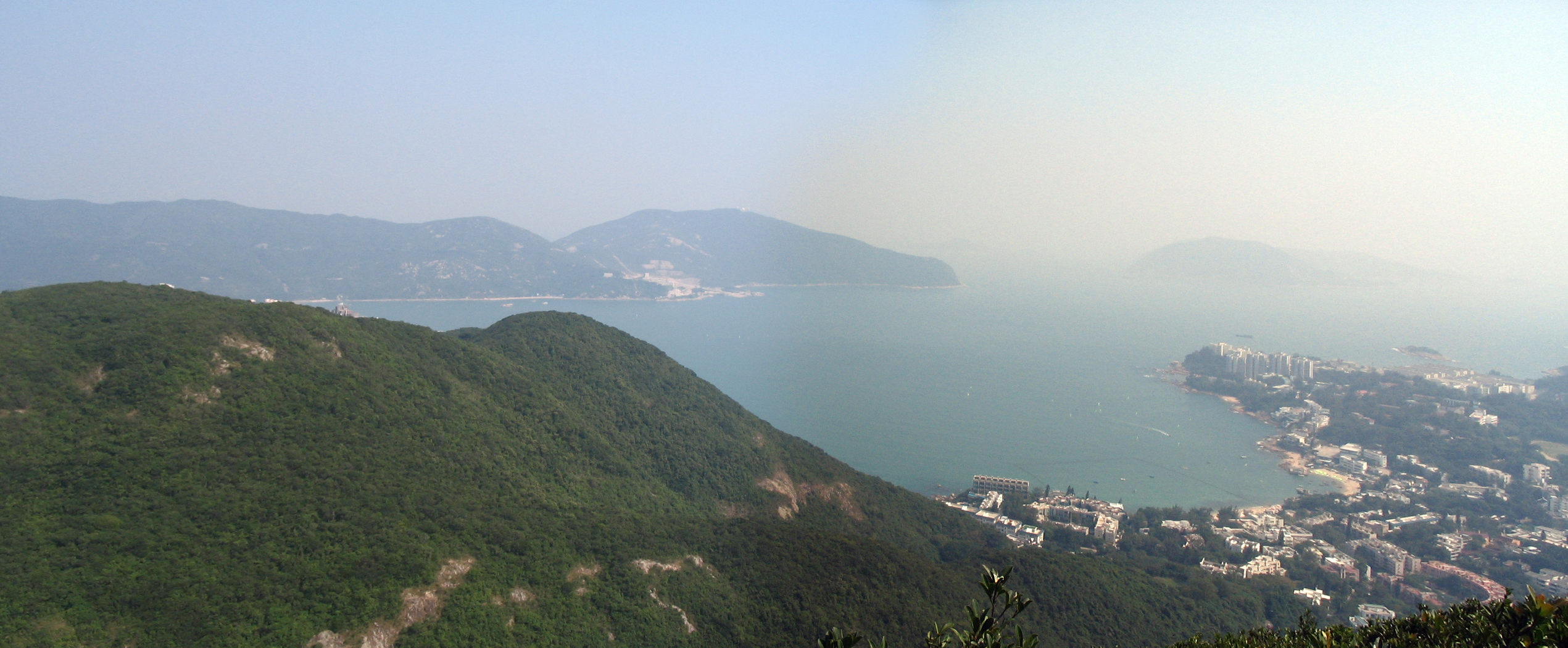
Tai Tam Bay. The settlement on the right is Stanley.

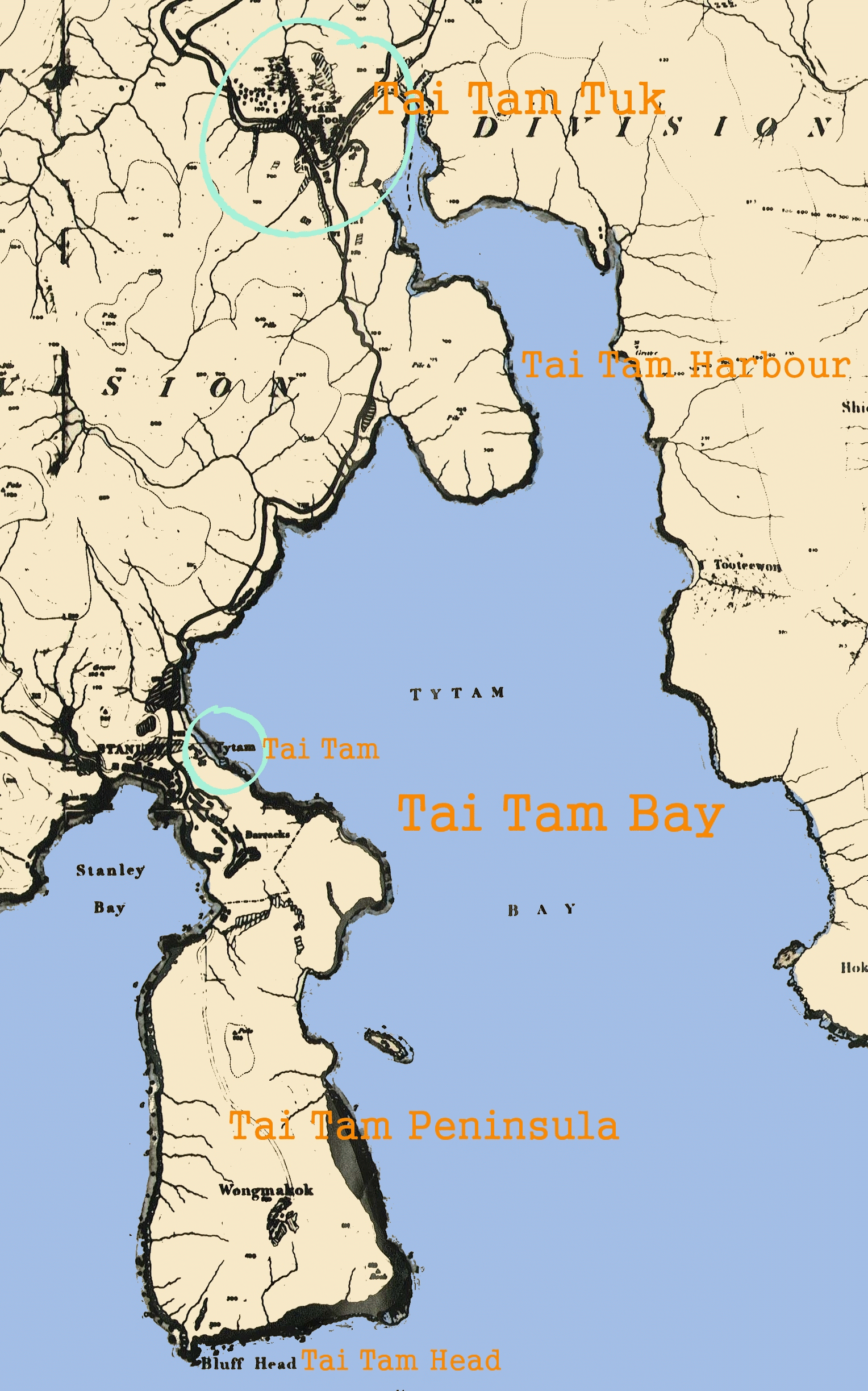
Map of Tai Tam and Tai Tam Bay (1845).

Tai Tam Bay (Chinese: 大潭灣) is a bay in the Tai Tam area, in the southeastern part of Hong Kong Island, in the Southern District of Hong Kong.

== Geography ==
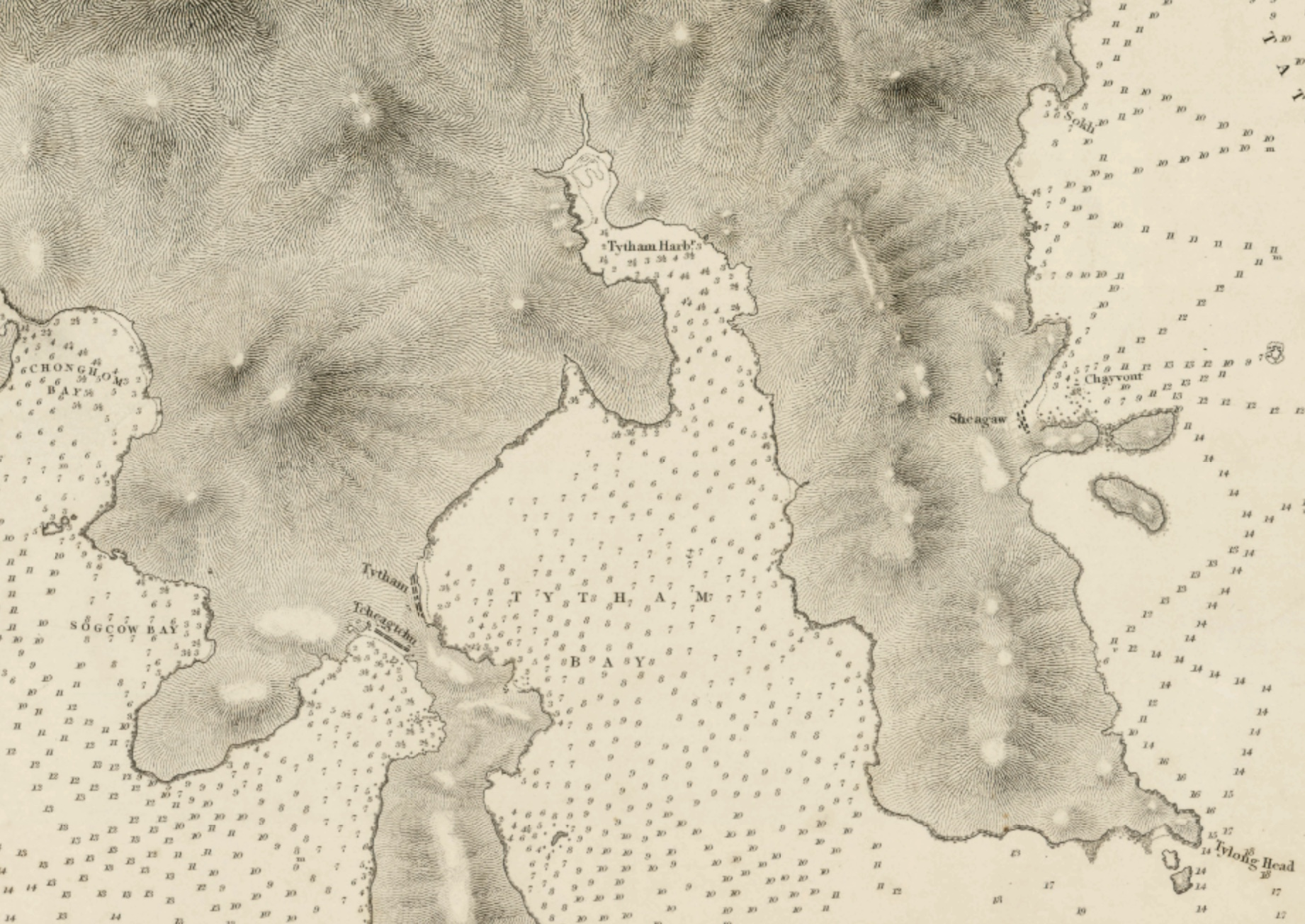
Tai Tam Bay in January 1843 as surveyed by HMS Sulphur

Tai Tam Bay has been documented as early as January 1843, after the Convention of Chuenpi, by HMS Sulphur commanded by Sir Edward Belcher and Sir Henry Kellett. The area was romanized as Tytham (see image).

Tai Tam Bay covers a marine area of about 8 square kilometres (3.1 sq mi). It comprises a narrow inlet to the inner bay area, named Tai Tam Harbour, as well as a much wider middle and outer bay. While the average water depth within Tai Tam Harbour is about 3 metres (9.8 ft), the water depth increases from 5 m (16 ft) in the middle bay to 9 m (30 ft) in the outer bay. The width of the opening of the bay is about 2.2 kilometres (1.4 mi).

The western point of the bay is Tai Tai Head or Tai Tam Tau (大潭頭) at the southern end of Stanley Peninsula, while the eastern point of entrance is Cape D'Aguilar on the southeastern end of D'Aguilar Peninsula.

To Tei Wan (土地灣) is a small bay located on the eastern side of Tai Tam Bay. It is the site of the small To Tei Wan Village (土地灣村). At the time of the 1911 census, the population of To Tei Wan was 54.
