= Stanley, Hong Kong =

Town in Hong Kong

Coordinates: 22°13′N 114°13′E

Stanley (Chek Chue)
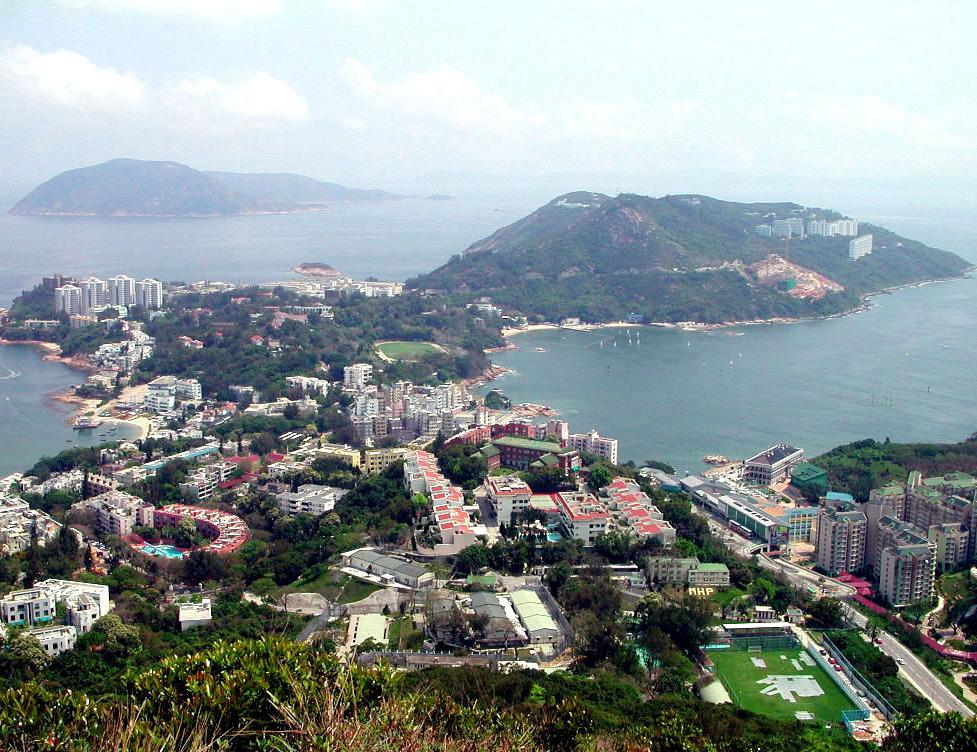
- Chinese: 赤柱
- Cantonese Yale: Chek Chyúh
- Literal meaning: red pillar
Transcriptions
Standard Mandarin
- Hanyu Pinyin: Chìzhù
Hakka
- Romanization: Cak^{5} Cu^{4}
Yue: Cantonese
- Yale Romanization: Chek Chyúh
- Jyutping: Cek^{3} Cyu^{5}
- IPA: [tsʰɛ̄ːk tɕʰȳː]

Stanley or Chek Chue, is a coastal town and a popular tourist attraction in Hong Kong. It is located on an eponymous peninsula on Hong Kong Island. It is east of Repulse Bay and west of Shek O, adjacent to Chung Hom Kok and Tai Tam. It is part of the Southern District.

The place was inhabited and can be traced back to the Ming Empire. Apart from the market town on land, as Stanley Bay (Chek Chu Wan) and Tai Tam Bay provided good shelter from typhoons, the Tanka people once took refuge and gathered in these bays. Once the most populous place on the island, it served as the capital of Hong Kong in 1841.

Stanley, a market town, is a popular tourist attraction in Hong Kong, known for its beaches and scenic bays. The southern end of the Stanley Peninsula, Wong Ma Kok, also known as the Bluff Head, where the Bluff Head Battery‌ is located, is considered strategically important for the defence of Hong Kong and is therefore closed to the public.

The town is also home to major correctional facilities.

Stanley was once considered a rural area on the island, attracting foreign settlers, but it underwent rapid expansion when large public housing estates were built in Ma Hang.

The Cantonese name Chek Chue refers to the original village-town, but in English, Stanley is commonly used to describe the entire surrounding area of the peninsula. In certain contexts, it is appropriate to use Chek Chue, particularly when referring to a specific historical event or the village itself. However, in everyday language, Stanley is generally preferred, as using an alternative term could lead to confusion or inconvenience, especially when it comes to public transport or addressing locations.

== Etymology ==
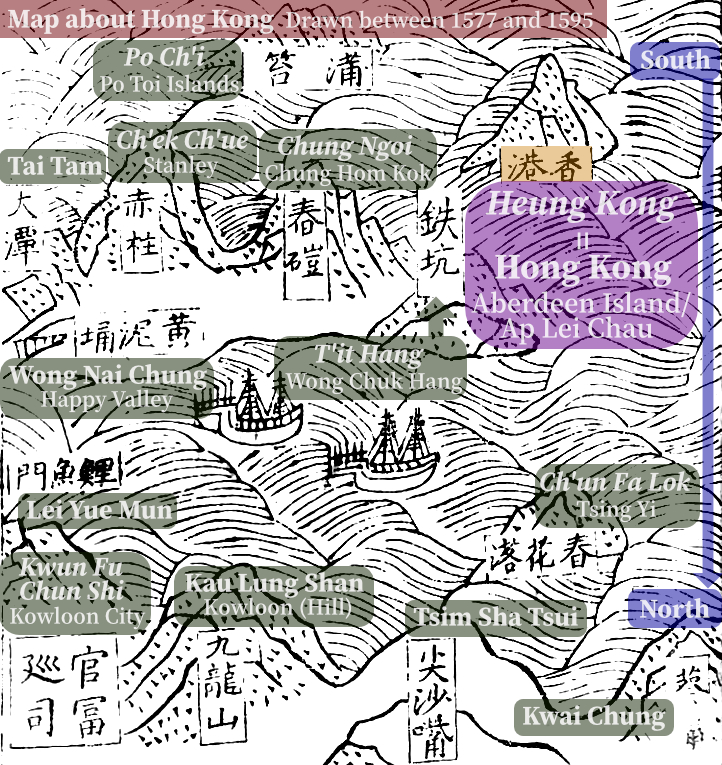
Stanley (赤柱) appeared on maps between 1577 and 1595.

Stanley was given its English name after Lord Stanley (later Earl of Derby), who was British Colonial Secretary at the time of the cession of Hong Kong to the United Kingdom in 1842, and later became Prime Minister. The use of Stanley as a place name dates back to no later than 1845, as shown on early maps.

Chek Chue is an English transcription of the Cantonese name 赤柱 in Chinese characters. The Chinese name first appeared on a map dated between 1577 and 1595, drawn during the Ming Empire.

The Chinese name 赤柱 can be transliterated as "Red Pillar." The original meaning has long been lost, as the earliest known record dates back to between 1577 and 1595 during Ming Empire. It may refer to the reddish rocks in the area, which stand erect like red pillars when viewed from the sea. Alternatively, in the evening, the reddish glow of the sunset might make the rocky outcrop resemble a red pillar. Other interpretations are left to the imagination; for example, the presence of many cotton trees, Bombax ceiba, which, when in bloom with red flowers, might have resembled a red pillar. Another story from the Qing Empire period tells of a typhoon that devastated everything except one cotton tree, which stood firm despite severe damage to its bark and leaves, appearing like a strong red pillar.

Any speculation about the origin of Chek Chue that depends on developments occurring only after the Ming Empire cannot stand up to historical scrutiny. For instance, the Hakka people only began settling in Hong Kong after 1668, following the end of the Great Clearance. Therefore, the hypothesis that the name derives from the Hakka term 賊住, meaning 'bandit's residence,' is historically improbable.

During the Qing Empire, the whole of Hong Kong Island was once referred to as Chek Chu Shan (赤柱山) in 1819, literally meaning "Red Pillar Hill" or "Red Pillar Island.

== History ==
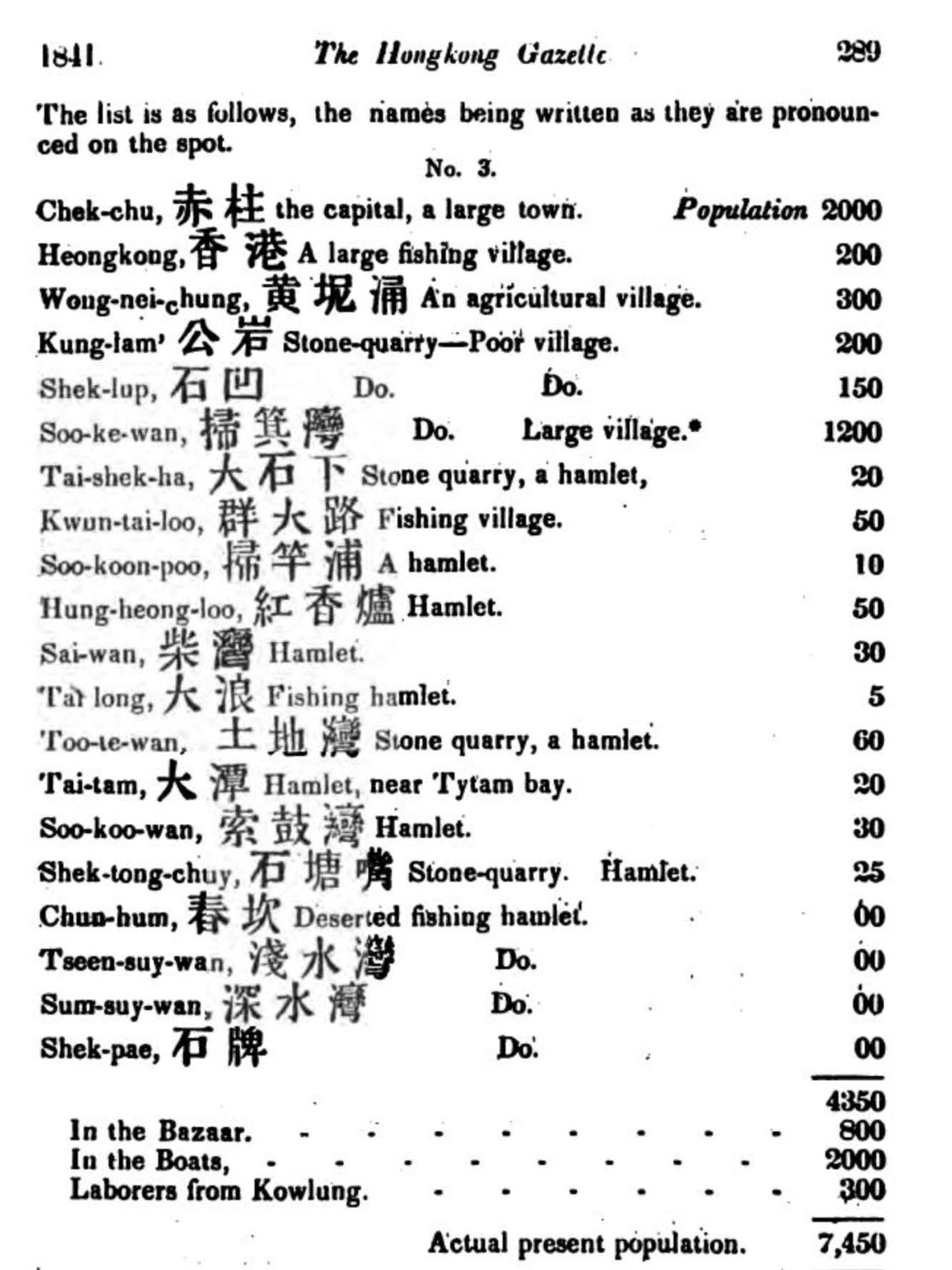
Stanley, first known as Chek-chu in 1841, served as the capital of the colony before being renamed Stanley. (The Hongkong Gazette, from Chinese Repository, 1841, on the population of Hong Kong Island)

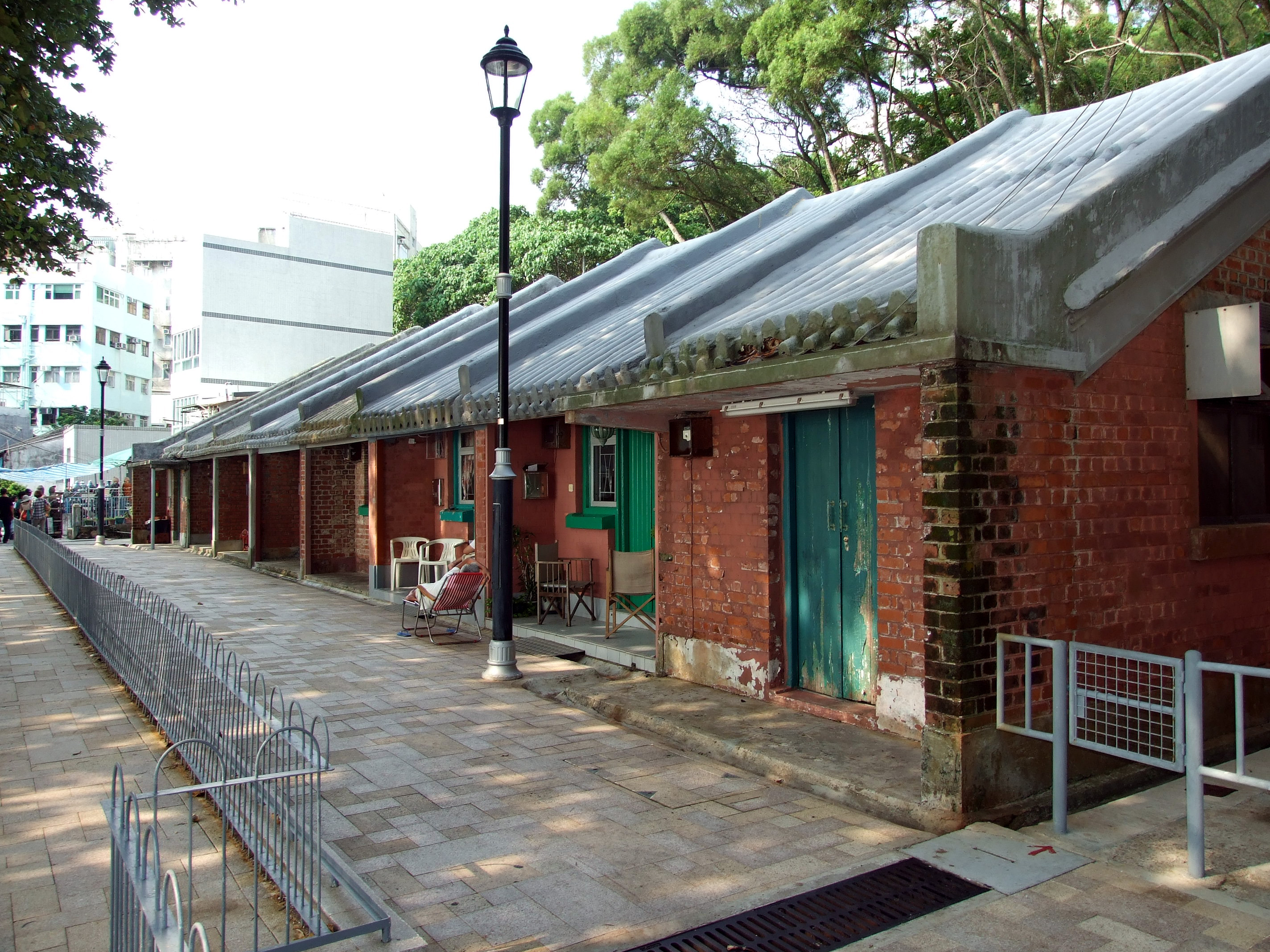
Pat Kan, a row of eight houses

The earliest known record of Stanley appeared on maps between 1577 and 1595, during the rule of the Ming Empire. The Chinese name 赤柱 remains the same as it is today. (see picture) The existence of the village must have predated the map.

The Tin Hau Temple on Stanley Main Street is very old, as evidenced by a bell cast for the temple in 1767. According to legend, the topography surrounding the village of Stanley resembled a crab, which was considered auspicious in fung shui. However, because crabs move sideways, it was believed this could bring instability. The temple was therefore built on the crab’s head to suppress its movement.

After the Convention of Chuenpi, the British occupied Hong Kong Island in 1841 and established Chek-chu, later renamed Stanley, the largest town at the time, as the capital of the colony of Hong Kong. The population at the time was around 2,000 people. After the annexation of Hong Kong in 1842, following the Treaty of Nanking, the British established Stanley as the temporary administrative centre before relocating it to the newly founded Victoria City.

When the British built a military camp on native land in Wong Ma Kok, they constructed a row of eight small houses near the market town as compensation. This area became known as Pat Kan (八間), meaning Eight Houses.

Present-day Stanley Fort was where British and Canadian troops mounted a last stand during the Battle of Hong Kong. The survivors surrendered to Japanese forces in December 1941. During the Japanese occupation of Hong Kong, between 1941 and 1945, around 2,800 non-Chinese prisoners of war, including men, women and children, were detained in the Stanley Internment Camp.

The fort, which was the former British Army barracks in Stanley, is now occupied by the People's Liberation Army following the handover of Hong Kong to the People's Republic of China in 1997.

== Places of interest ==
Stanley, Hong Kong

Promenade in Stanley, Hong Kong

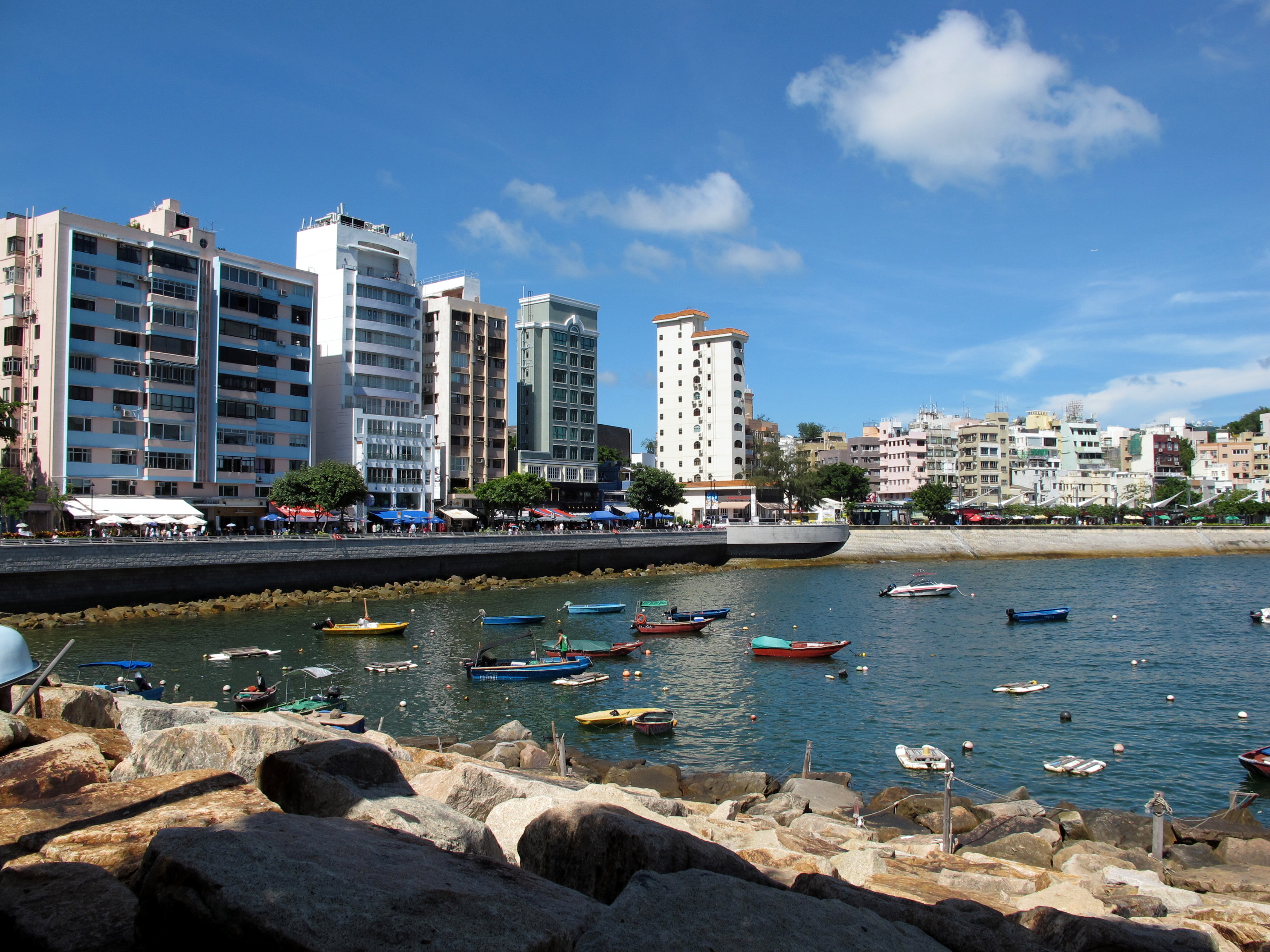
Main Street waterfront

=== Stanley Market and Pat Kan Uk ===
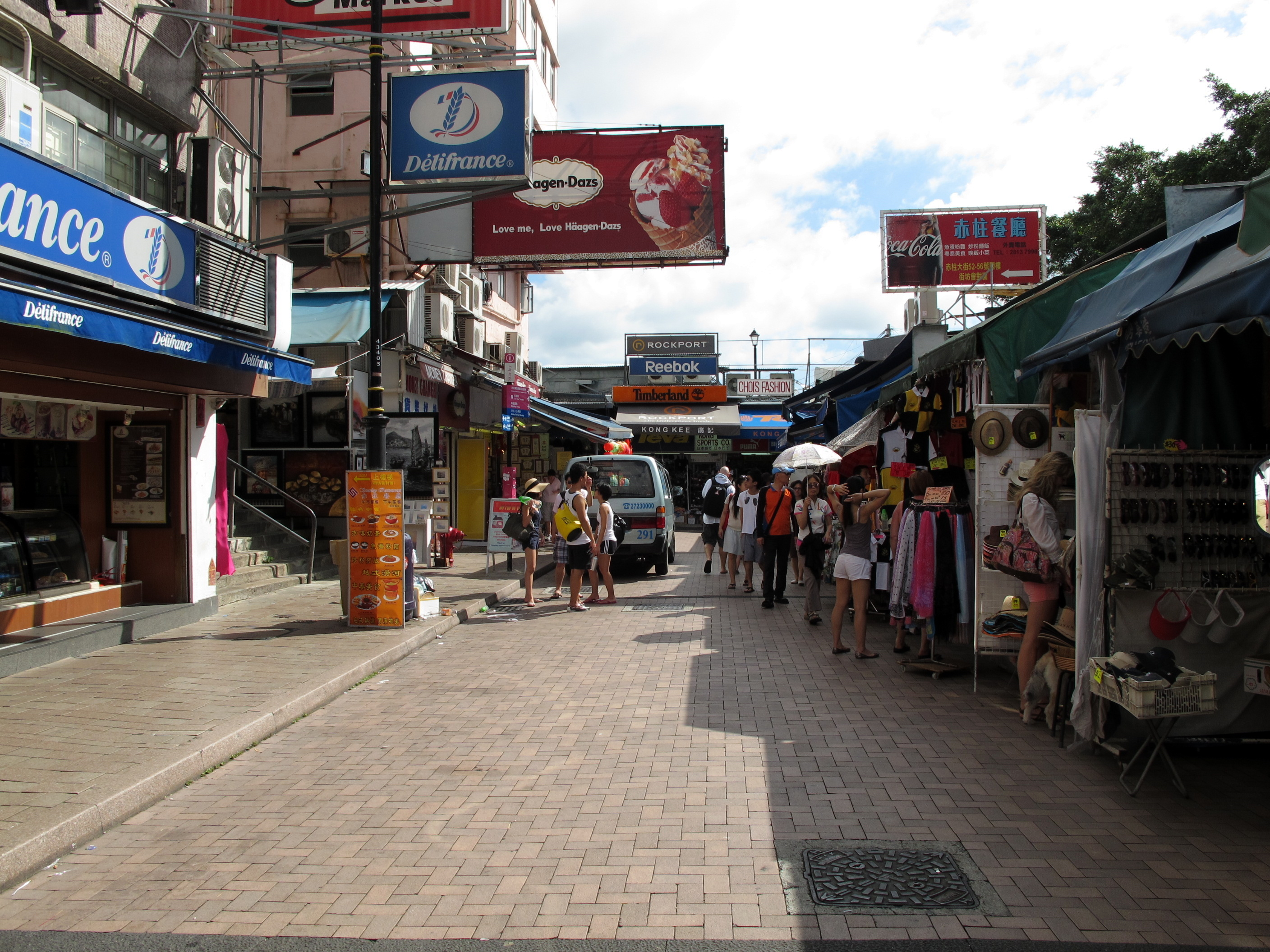
Stanley Market

Stanley Market is situated in Stanley New Street near the Stanley food market. It is an array of small shops and street stalls.

=== Stanley Main Street ===
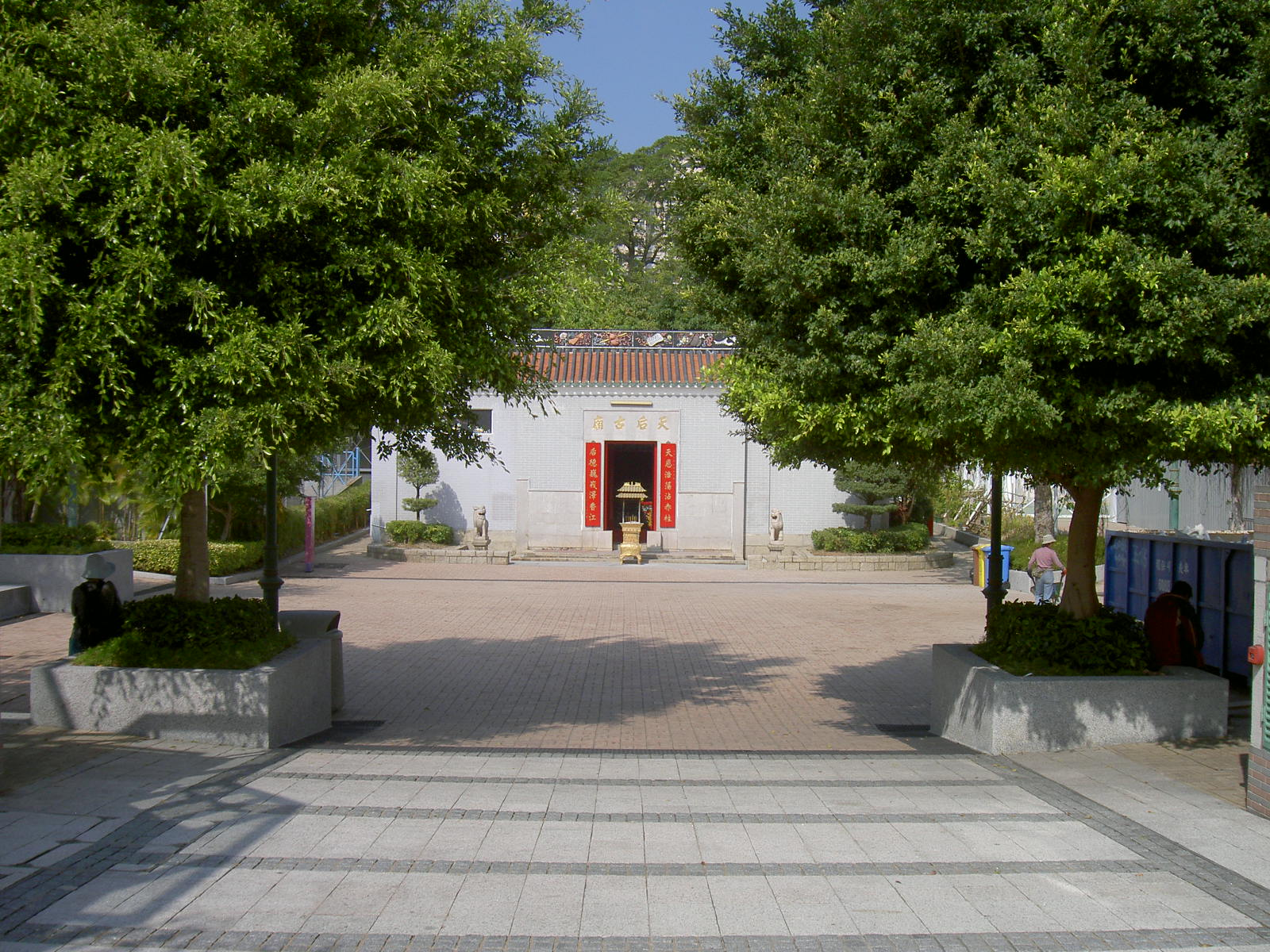
‌Tin Hau Temple

Stanley has many bars and restaurants on its waterfront along Stanley Main Street.

To the west of Stanley Main Street, past the amphitheatre in Stanley Plaza is the Tin Hau Temple (Temple of the Queen of Heaven). Built by Cheung Po Tsai in 1767, it is one of the oldest temples in Hong Kong.

=== Murray House ===
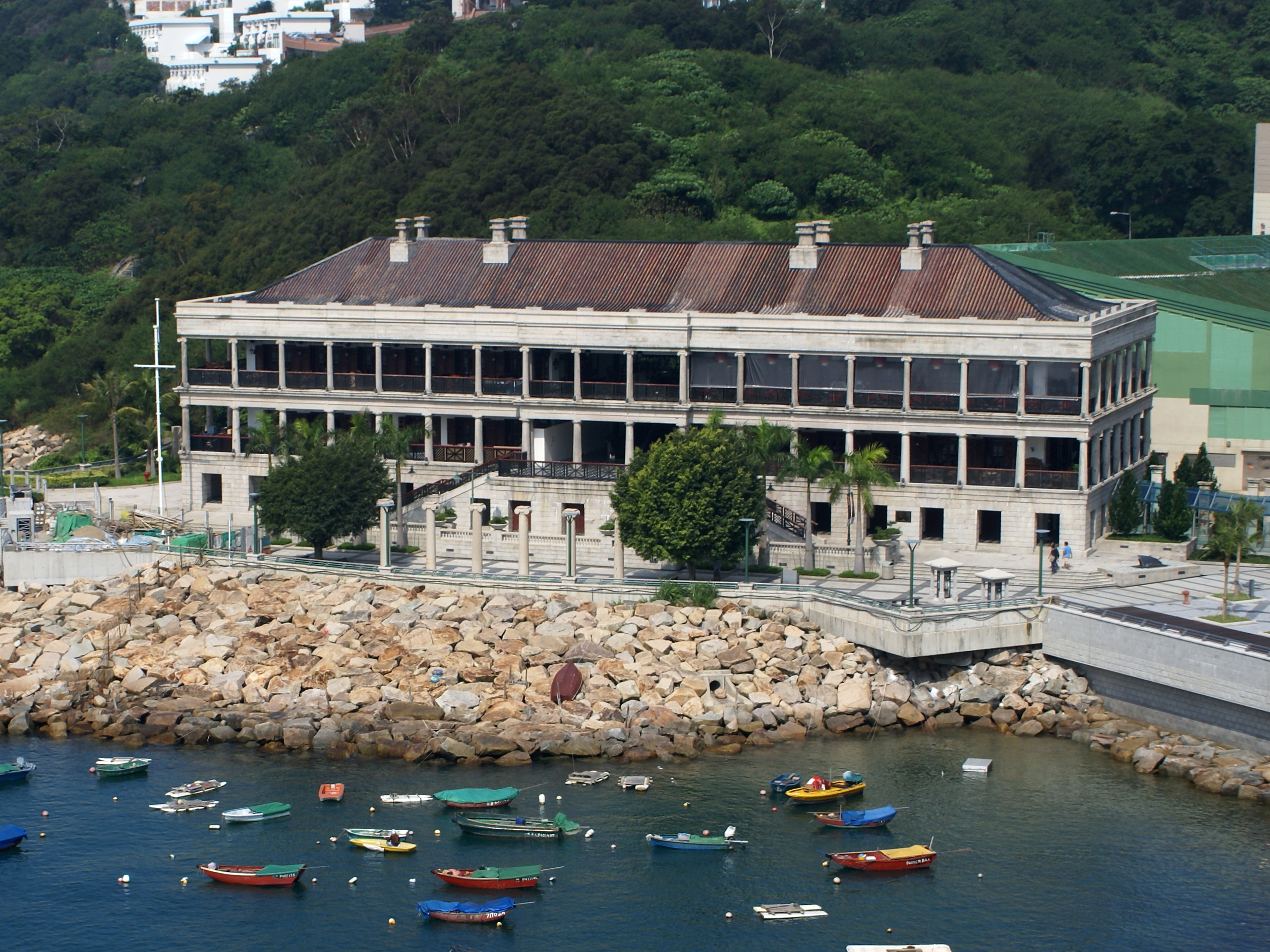
Murray House

Murray House is a Victorian-era building originally built in the present-day business district of Central in 1846 as officers' quarters of the Murray Barracks, the building was relocated to Stanley during the 2000s.

=== Stanley Plaza ===
Adjacent to Murray House and Lung Tak Court, Stanley Plaza opened in 2001. It includes a shopping arcade and an outdoor community amphitheatre. The complex is owned by Link REIT. Numerous free concerts and events are held in the amphitheatre throughout the year. In November 2011, Stanley Plaza reopened after a major renovation which was part of the transfer from government ownership to Link REIT ownership. A number of Asian and western restaurants, a supermarket, Starbucks, McDonald's and a variety of shops can be found in Stanley Plaza. Well integrated with the Stanley Main Street waterfront and historic Murray House, Stanley Plaza provides convenient access to nearby tourist spots such as Tin Hau Temple and Stanley Ma Hang Park.

=== Beaches in Stanley ===
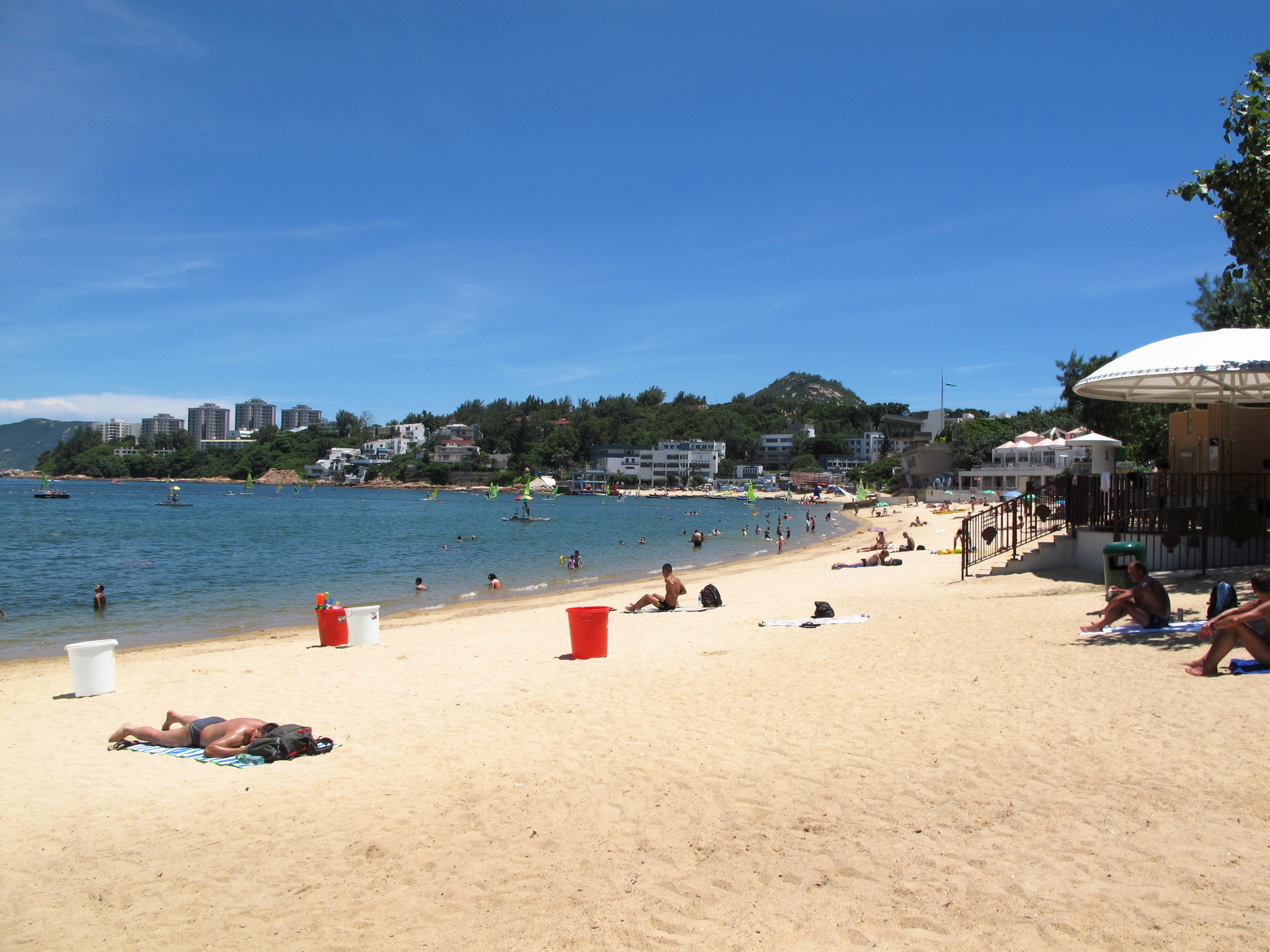
Stanley Beach

Stanley is famous for its two beaches: Stanley Main Beach, located on the eastern side of the peninsula, and St. Stephen's Beach, on the western side. Both beaches are sandy and have areas designed for barbecues. Like many beaches in Hong Kong, they also have netted perimeters to protect swimmers from sharks.

The larger of the two beaches - Stanley Main Beach, which is also popular with windsurfers and other watersport enthusiasts, hosts the Stanley Dragon Boat Championships each year in June to celebrate the Tuen Ng Festival.

A Water Sports Training Centre run by the Government is located at Stanley Main Beach.

=== St. Stephen's College ===
St. Stephen's College is a primary and secondary school that has been located in Stanley for over 100 years. It has both day students and boarding facilities. Originally a private school, St. Stephen's College became a government-funded public school during the late 1900s. The college's oldest building, the School House, was declared a monument in 2011, being one of the few schools in Hong Kong to own a Declared Monument in its campus.

=== Correctional Services Department (CSD) Complex ===
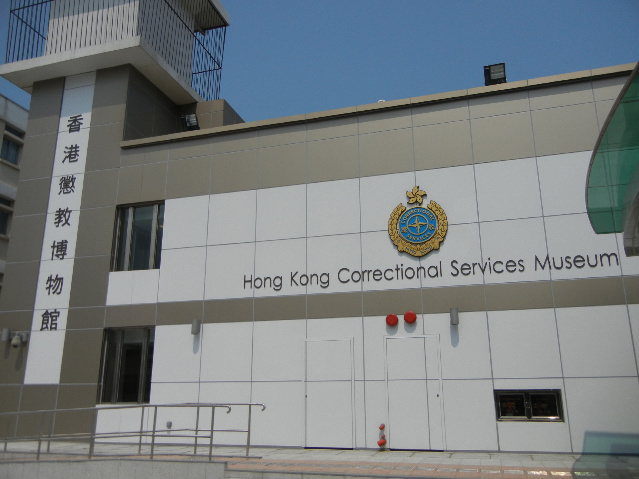
Hong Kong Correctional Services Museum

Stanley Prison is a maximum security level correctional facility, established in 1937, that houses the most hardened of criminals from the Hong Kong Judicial System. The Pak Sha Wan Correctional Institution (a medium security institution established in 1999) and the Tung Tau Correctional Institution (a minimum security institution established in 1982) are all part of the overall Hong Kong Correctional Services Department complex in Stanley. Nearby on Stanley Village Road is the Ma Hang Prison (a minimum security institution established in 1974) which houses male adult prisoners and clinically old prisoners of low security risk.

The CSD Staff Training Institute‌‌‌ is also located in Stanley. It is responsible for planning and implementing training programmes to equip CSD staff with relevant knowledge.

The Correctional Services Museum is located at the entrance to the CSD complex in Stanley. It is open from 10:00 am to 5:00 pm daily except Mondays and public holidays. The Museum's collection has over 680 artefacts in nine galleries occupying some 480 square metres. Admission to the museum is free of charge.

=== Rhino Rock ===
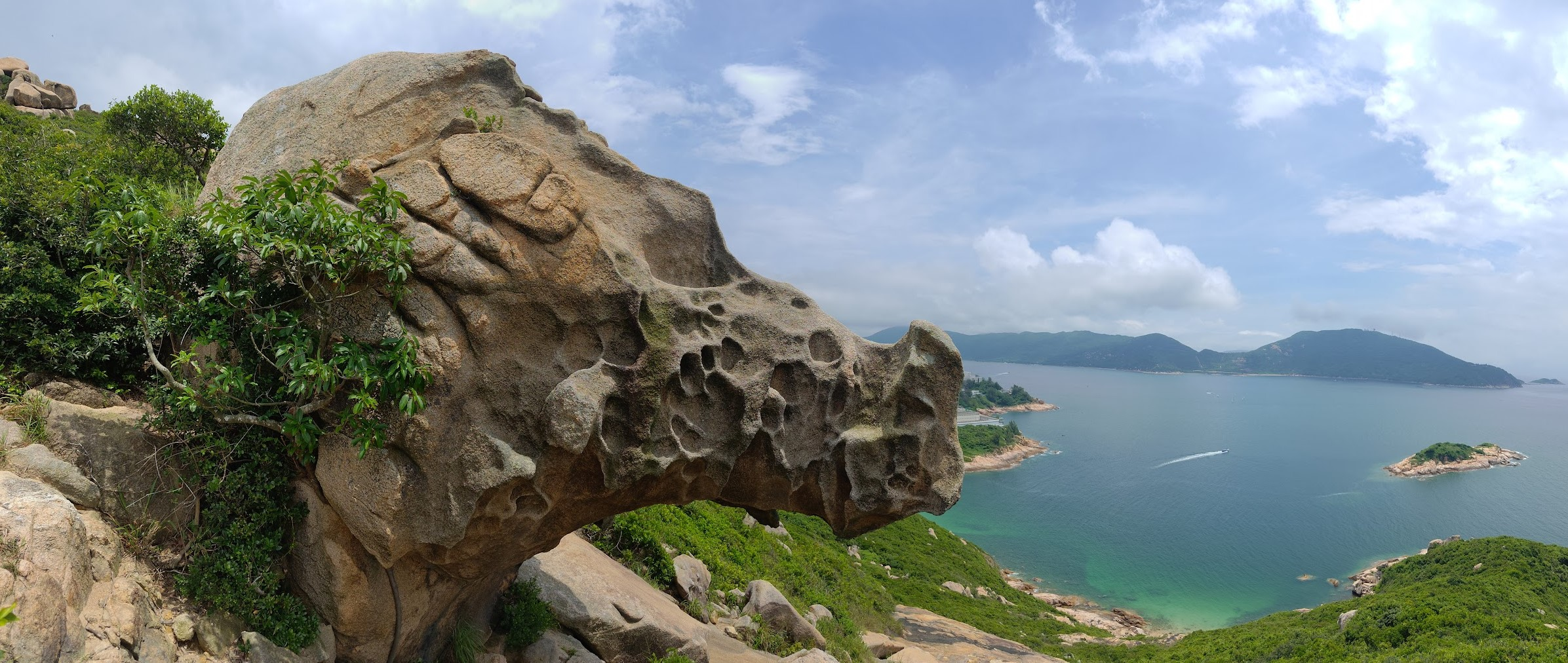
Rhino Rock overlooking Stanley

Rhino Rock, or Che Pau Teng, is a famous landmark that's a short hike within Stanley. The hike's main claim to fame is the rhinoceros-shaped rock that overlooks the Correctional Services Department Complex and the South China Sea. The trail takes just over an hour to complete. Despite its short duration, it is easy to get lost, so attempt this hike with caution.

=== Ma Hang Park ===
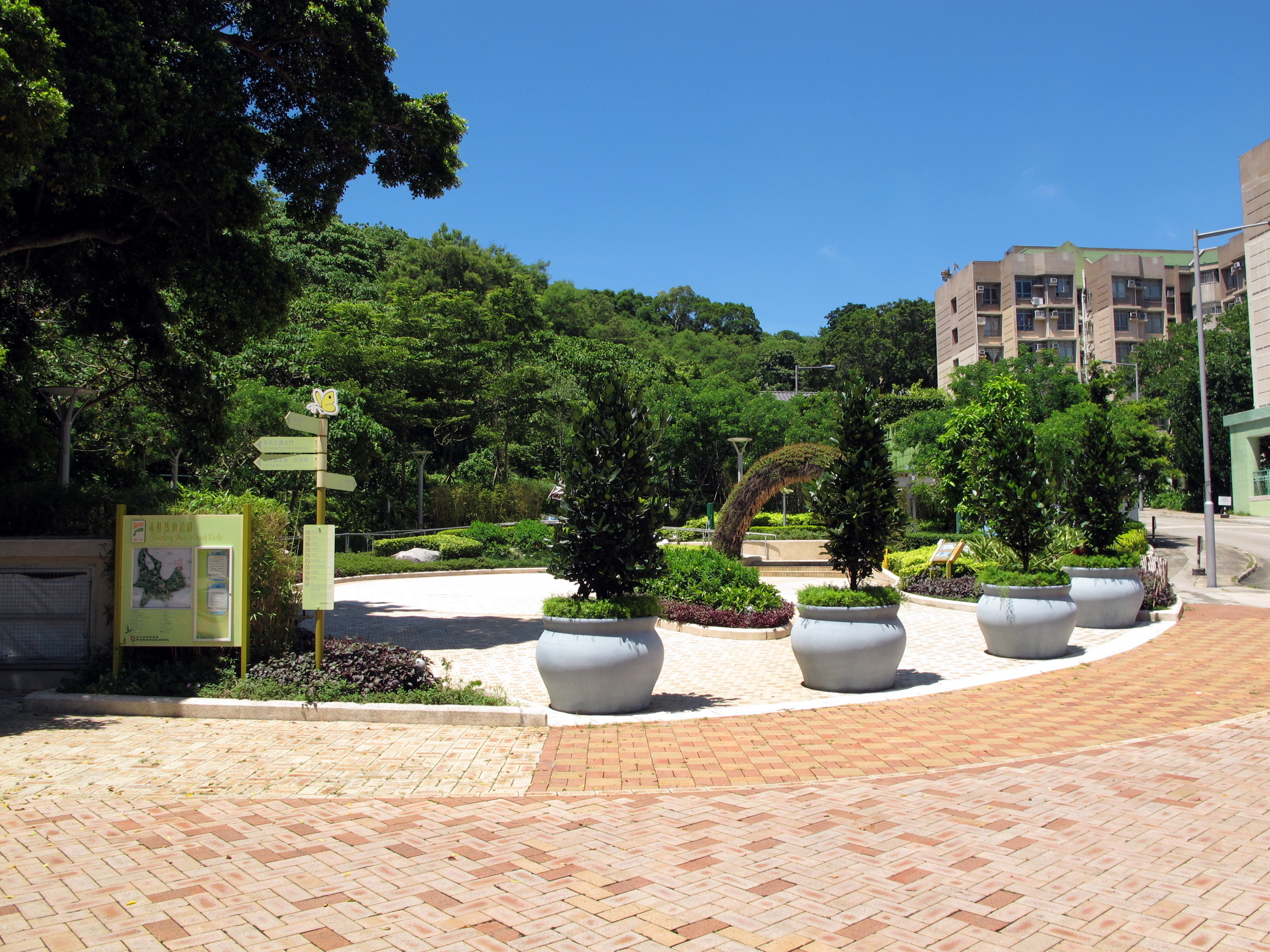
Ma Hang Park entrance

Stanley Ma Hang Park opened on 17 January 2011. The park has an area of 50,000 square metres (540,000 sq ft) featuring various thematic zones to cater for people of all ages and interests. Pedestrian paths have been improved to enable safe and easy access to the various thematic zones, with display boards set up to introduce the birds, butterflies and plant species found in the park. Pak Tai Temple is also a part of the park. It was built in 1805 when Stanley was a major fishing village, and dedicated to the "protector of fishermen".

=== Other areas of interest in Stanley ===
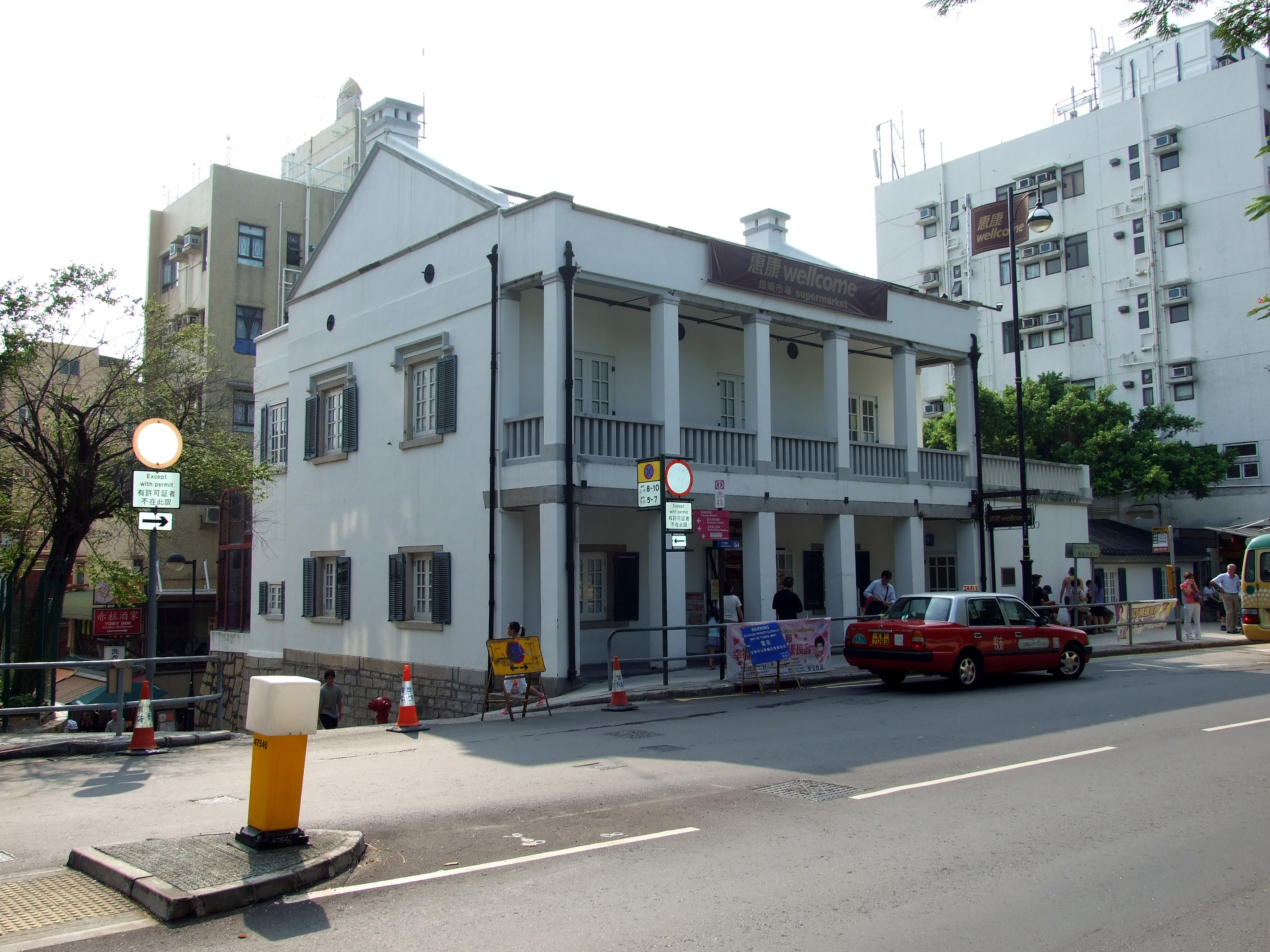
Old Stanley Police Station

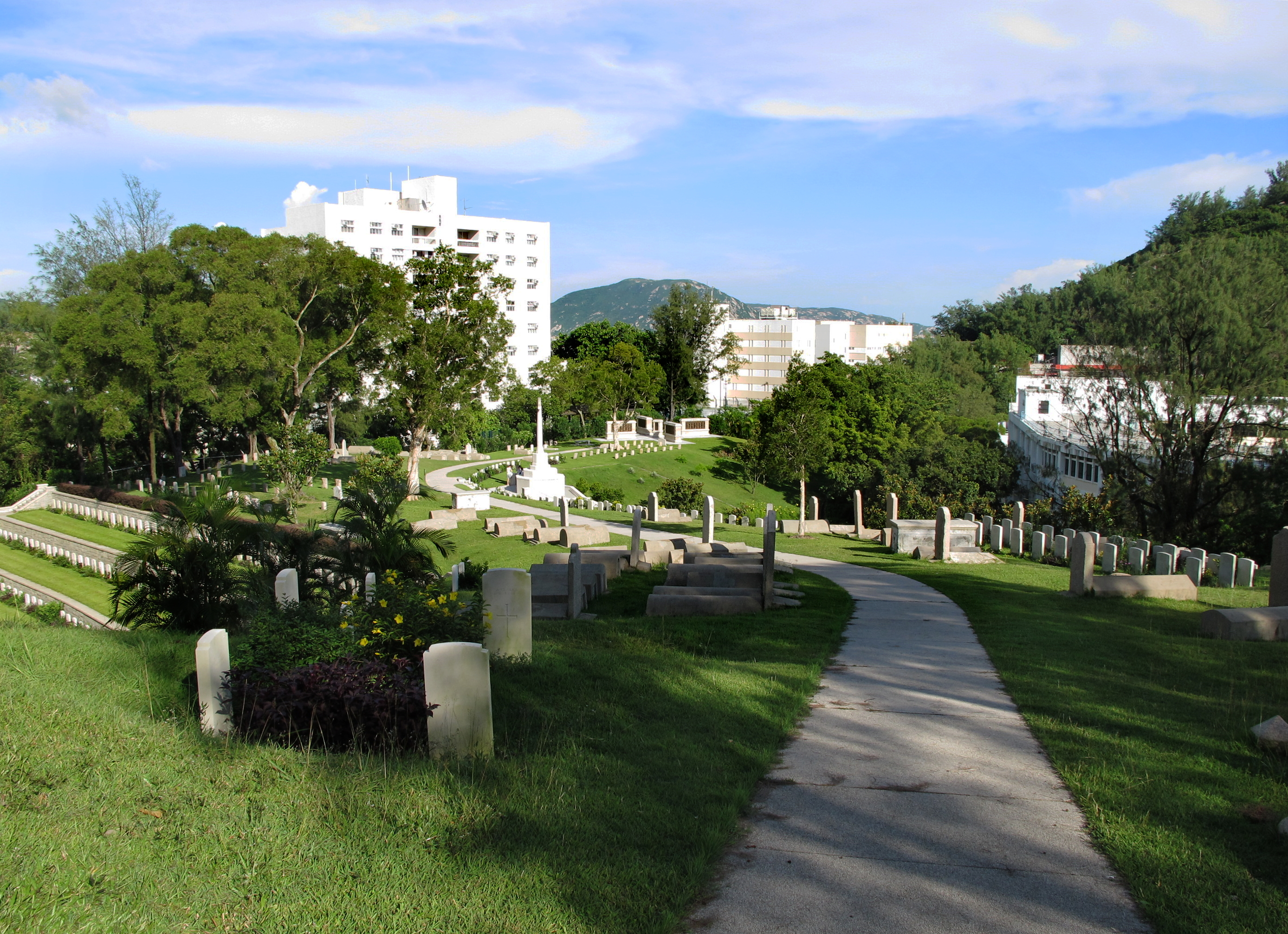
Stanley Military Cemetery

- The Stanley Military Cemetery is located near St. Stephen's Beach.
- The Old Stanley Police Station, built in 1859 is a declared monument of Hong Kong. Today it still remains the same architecture, but there is nothing in it.
- Blake Pier at Stanley
- The Stanley Municipal Building opened in the summer of 2006. It houses some government offices, a medium-sized branch‌ of the Hong Kong Public Library containing both English and Chinese books. It also houses several recreational rooms such as basketball and badminton courts. There is a "garden zone" on the roof of the library section of the building with a view of Stanley Harbour.
- The Stanley Fort is a PLA military barracks located at the southernmost part of Stanley peninsula, south of the lighthouse. It is not open to tourists or to the public.
- The Smugglers Inn is a British styled pub.
- Stanley Post Office‌

== Education ==
- The Hong Kong Sea School is located at 13-15 Tung Tau Wan Road in Stanley.
- The St. Stephen’s College is located at 22 Tung Tau Wan Road in Stanley.

Stanley falls within Primary One Admission (POA) School Net 18, along with Pok Fu Lam, Baguio Villa, Aberdeen, Tin Wan, Shek Pai Wan, Ap Lei Chau, Wong Chuk Hang, Shouson Hill, Deep Water Bay, Repulse Bay and Chung Hom Kok. As a result, pupils may attend schools in any of these areas. Within the school net are several aided schools (which operate independently but are funded by the government), as well as the Hong Kong Southern District Government Primary School.

Hong Kong Public Libraries operates the Stanley Public Library in the Stanley Municipal Services Building.

== Public housing ==
=== Ma Hang Estate ===
Ma Hang Estate (Chinese: 馬坑邨) is a public housing estate in Stanley. Formerly the site of Ma Hang Squatter Area, the estate is designed as "working village" and consists of 5 residential blocks completed between 1993 and 2000 for providing in-site rehousing for squatters. Stanley Plaza, Murray House and Blake Pier at Stanley are also the territories of Ma Hang Estate.

Name	Type	Completion
Chun Ma House	Harmony Rural 1	1993
Kin Ma House	Harmony Rural 1	1993
Koon Ma House	Harmony Rural 1	1993
Leung Ma House	Harmony Rural 1	1993
Ying Ma House	Harmony Rural 3	2000

=== Lung Yan Court ===
Lung Yan Court (Chinese: 龍欣苑) is a Home Ownership Scheme court in Stanley, next to Ma Hang Estate. Formerly the site of Ma Hang Squatter Area, the court has two blocks built in 1993.

Name	Type	Completion
Lung Chun House	Harmony Rural 1	1993
Lung Tan House	Harmony Rural 1	1993

=== Lung Tak Court ===
Lung Tak Court (Chinese: 龍德苑) was originally planned for rental housing, but it was later converted to HOS court for sale. it consists of 4 blocks built in 2000. Owners who have paid the land premium may rent their premises out in the open market. Apartments in this area offers an attractive alternative to living in the more built up areas like Wanchai or North Point because there is much more greenery and open spaces around and buildings in Stanley are low rises. It is considered to be very convenient because it is located right next to Stanley Plaza and to the transport interchange.

Name	Type	Completion
Chun Tak House	Harmony Rural	2000
Shing Tak House	Harmony Rural	2000
Chi Tak House	Harmony Rural	2000
Yi Tak House	Harmony Rural	2000

== Hiking ==
The starting point of Section 1 of the Wilson Trail is located in Stanley, where the trail passes over The Twins and Violet Hill before reaching the junction with Section 2.

Hiking options near Stanley include Chung Hom Shan and the Devil’s Paw. Both peaks are located in Chung Hom Kok, an area adjacent to Stanley.

Rhino Rock, also known as Che Pau Teng, is a popular spot for light hiking in Stanley.

== Demographics ==
According to The Wall Street Journal in a 2015 article, Stanley has a "a sizeable French population." This population was reported to have come in the late 2000s and early 2010s and consisted of young professional French people.

== Notable people ==
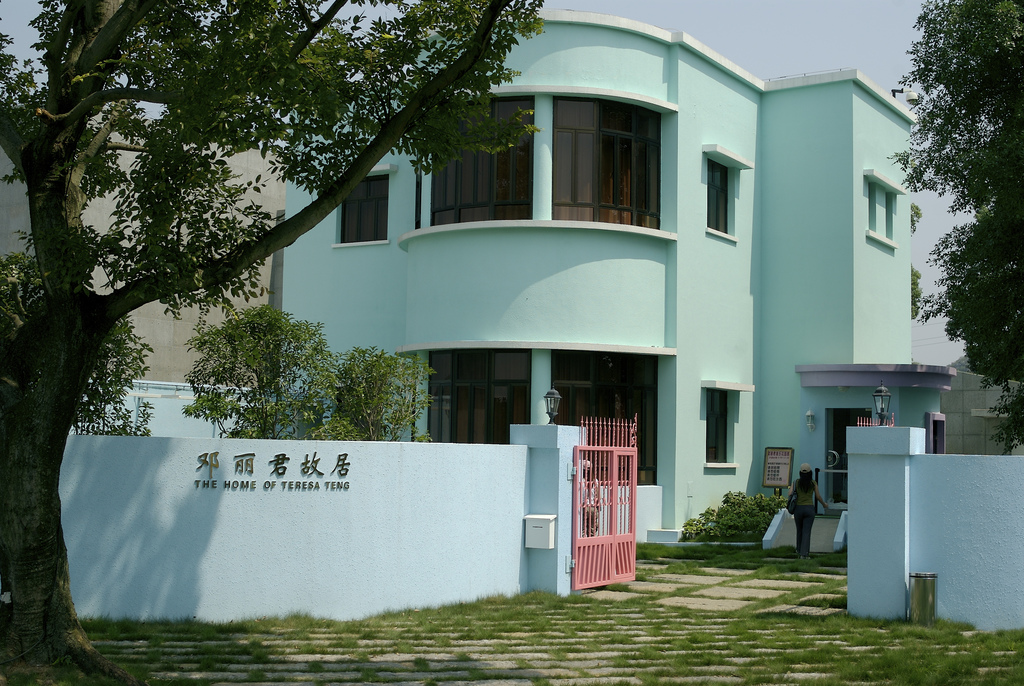
The former residence of Teresa Teng in Stanley

- Teresa Teng, a famous singer in East Asia, lived at 18 Carmel Road in Stanley. Her former residence was once converted into a museum, but was later demolished.

== Transport ==
Stanley is served by several bus routes along Repulse Bay Road and Tai Tam Road. It is easy to reach with several buses that go back and forth from all over Hong Kong, for example:

- Citybus bus routes 6, 6A, 6X, 66 and 260 from Central Exchange Square.
- Citybus bus route 14 from Grand Promenade in Sai Wan Ho.
- Citybus bus route 973 from Tsim Sha Tsui in Kowloon.
- Citybus bus route 73 from Cyberport.
- Citybus bus route 63 from Causeway Bay.
- Island Green Minibus route 16M from Chai Wan station in Chai Wan.
- Island Green Minibus route 40 operates 24 hours a day. Its terminus in Causeway Bay is located at Jardine’s Crescent, directly opposite the SOGO Department Store.

In addition to the numerous bus routes, the area is also served by a taxi rank. The taxis are red in colour.

There is no direct MTR line serving Stanley. However, the South Island Line provides an alternative, with Ocean Park station offering connections to various parts of Hong Kong. From there, passengers can transfer to bus or minibus services to avoid traffic congestion on the northern side of Hong Kong Island and through the Aberdeen Tunnel. Residents of Stanley can also reach Chai Wan MTR station by bus or green minibus route 16.

== See also ==
- Beaches of Hong Kong
  - Hairpin Beach
- List of places in Hong Kong
- Tourism in Hong Kong
- Maryknoll House (Stanley)
