= Redhill Peninsula =

Private housing estate in Hong Kong

Coordinates: 22.2316°N 114.2286°E

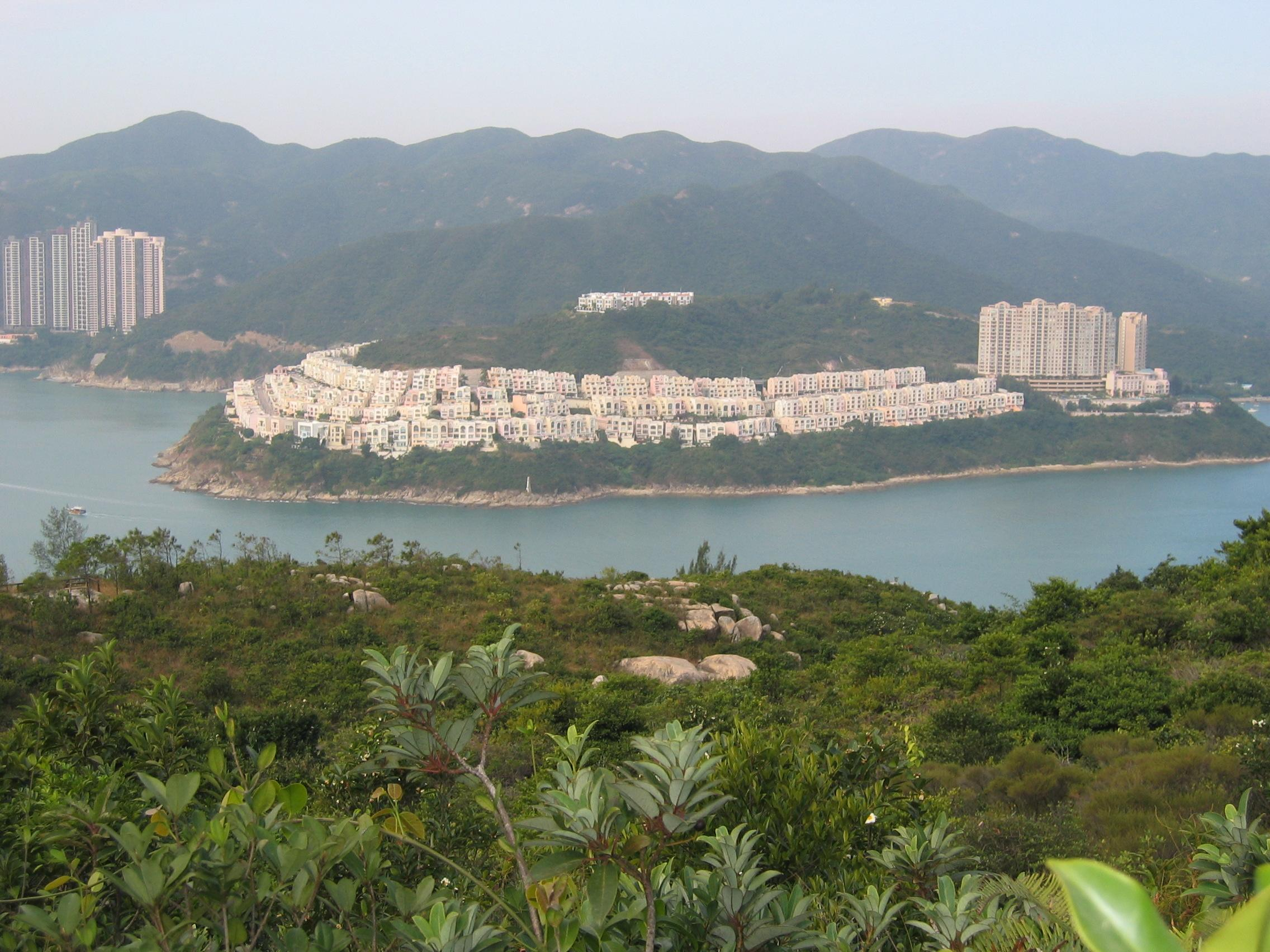
Redhill Peninsula viewed from Shek O Country Park

Redhill Peninsula (Chinese: 紅山半島) is a low rise private housing estate in Tai Tam, Hong Kong. It is built at a round-shaped peninsula situated in Southern District towards Tai Tam Harbour and Turtle Cove. The peninsula includes a 113 metres hill named 'Red Hill'.

Redhill Peninsula was developed by Sino Land and Chinachem in four phases, completed between 1990 and 1992. The houses are constructed on three levels.

== Roadways ==
Cedar Drive and Palm Drive are the two main roads within Redhill Peninsula. There are also pedestrian paths leading through private residential areas.
