= Stanley Fort =

Military installation in Hong Kong

- Traditional Chinese: 赤柱炮台
Transcriptions
Yue: Cantonese
- Yale Romanization: Chek chyúh paau tòih
- Jyutping: Cek3 cyu5 paau3 toi4

Stanley Fort
- Hong Kong
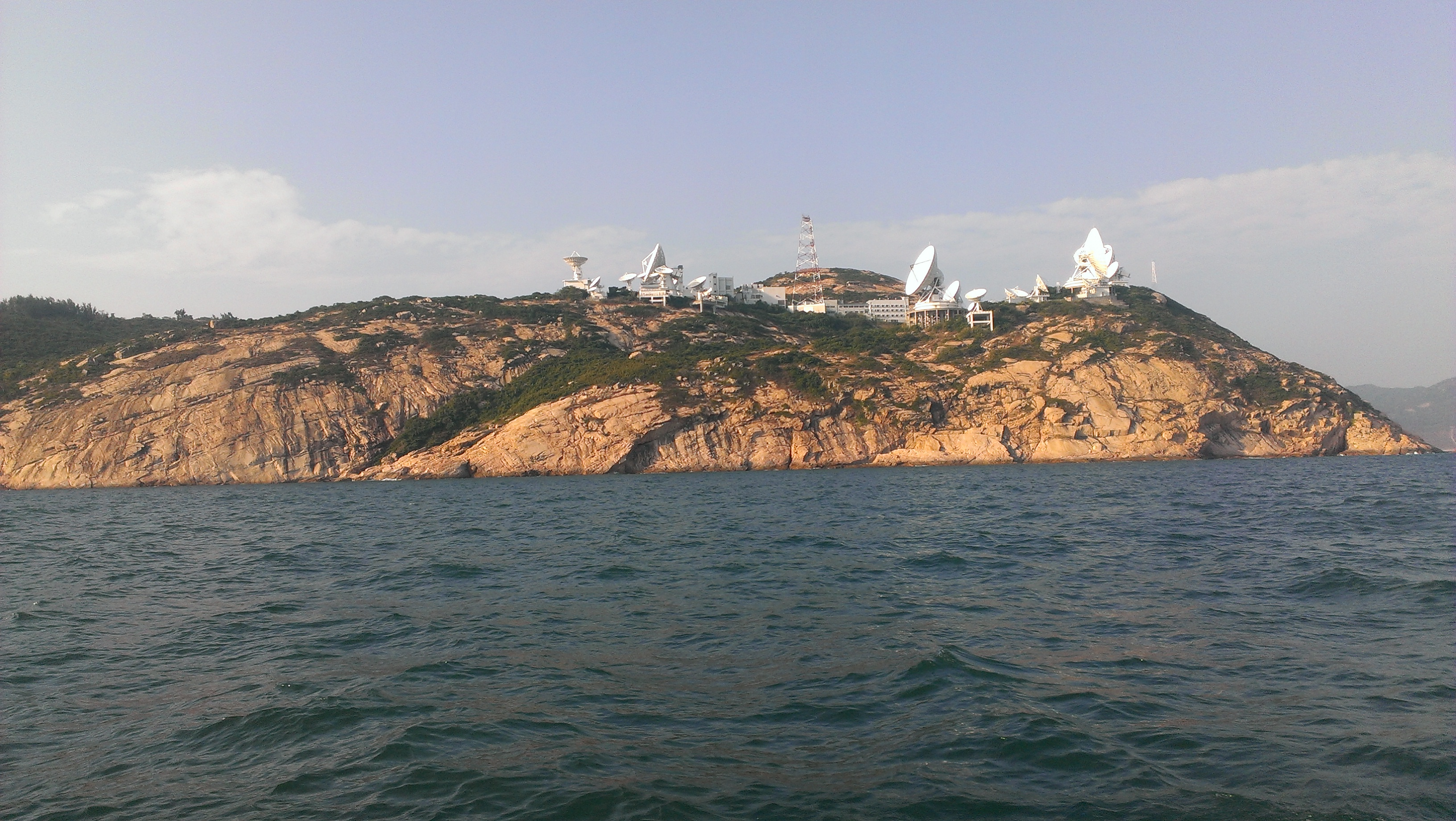
- Former site of the Fort in October 2013

Site information
- Type: Barracks

Location
- Location within Hong Kong
- Coordinates: 22.201°N 114.218°E

Site history
- Built: circa 1841
- Built for: War Office
- In use: 1841 – present

Garrison information
- Occupants: People's Liberation Army Ground Force

Stanley Fort (Chinese: 赤柱炮台) is both an area and a fort on Hong Kong Island in Hong Kong, situated at the southern end of Stanley Peninsula, near the town of Stanley (赤柱, Chek Chue). It lies just south of the peak of Che Pau Teng and includes the headland of Wong Ma Kok. The area is mainly occupied by Chek Chue Barracks and the Hong Kong Earth Station. In 2000, the area was redesignated as a military zone, with the Stanley Fort Gate bus terminus located just outside the barracks entrance.

== History ==
Imperial China recognised the strategic importance of the area for maritime defence and constructed a fort on the peninsula, although it was eventually abandoned.

The British occupied Hong Kong Island in 1841 and quickly established a village-town, Chek-chu, later renamed Stanley in English, with a population of around 2,000, which became the first capital of the new colony. To defend the capital, a military camp was constructed near the town. However, the camp was demolished in the 1880s and was later occupied by St Stephen's College.

The present-day Stanley Fort was constructed between 1935 and 1937 at the southern part of the peninsula, amid rising Japanese aggression in China. The British Armed Forces recognised the need for enhanced defence capabilities in Hong Kong, in accordance with the limitations set by the Washington Naval Treaty. The fort fell to the Japanese after being surrounded on 25 December 1941 in the Battle of Hong Kong.

The construction led to the relocation of the local inhabitants to Stanley, where they were compensated with a terrace of eight houses, known as Pat Kan. Stanley Prison was also built around the same time as Stanley Fort.

Hong Kong Earth Station was set up in Stanley Fort in 1969.

The fort was once delisted as a military zone during the late colonial period. It was subsequently used as the Kai Chi Children's Centre and the Aberdeen Rehabilitation Centre. In 2000, however, it was re-listed as Chek Chue Barracks, under the law for military installation, and became home to the Hong Kong garrison of the Chinese People's Liberation Army Ground Force.

The fort, which occupied a site of 128 hectares, was founded in 1841 on the Stanley Peninsula at the southern side of Hong Kong Island. It had barracks and officers quarters. Coastal artillery batteries, such as Stanley Battery and Bluff Head Battery protected the southern approaches. During the Battle of Hong Kong on 25 December 1941, the fort was where British and Canadian troops mounted a final counterattack against Japanese positions at St Stephen's College. The fallen servicemen were buried in the nearby Stanley Military Cemetery.

The fort then became under the control of the Japanese who modified the fort to make it more shell-proof during the Second World War. In the late 1940s, Stanley Fort reverted to its former purpose as a British Army barracks. By the early 1950s the fort was base of the 27th Heavy Anti-aircraft Regiment and a small workshop operated by the Royal Electrical and Mechanical Engineers. The fort had three-storied barracks, a two-storey NAAFI, medical facilities and a Company HQ building. It also had a parade ground and vehicle and equipment park. In 1997, control was handed to the People's Liberation Army following the Transfer of sovereignty over Hong Kong.

== Conservation ==
Five listed heritage buildings referring to Stanley Fort can be found in the area, Stanley Fort, Stanley Battery Gun Emplacement (Grade I), and Stanley Fort Blocks 17, 38, 51 and 09 (Grade II) in 2009.

The Stanley Battery Gun Emplacement at Chek Chue Barracks is listed as one of the Grade I historic buildings and thus is protected under the Antiquities and Monuments Ordinance.

== See also ==
- List of Grade I historic buildings in Hong Kong
