= Smugglers Inn, Hong Kong =

British pub in Stanley, Hong Kong Island

The Smugglers Inn is a British-style pub in Stanley, on the south side of Hong Kong Island.

Named after the smugglers that used to inhabit Stanley (Chek Chue, the Cantonese name for Stanley literally translated as "Bandit's post"), the Smugglers Inn has wooden beams across the ceiling as well as tables and stools made from old barrels. The pub serves beer alongside sandwiches and pies.

The Smugglers Inn has been mentioned in a travel guide. The pub is renowned to host the best dart players in the Expat and local communities competing for free drinks. Customers would have also chosen to compete in foot races across the harbor for free drinks.
