= Red Hill (Hong Kong) =

Hill located in Tai Tam, Southern District, Hong Kong

- 白筆山
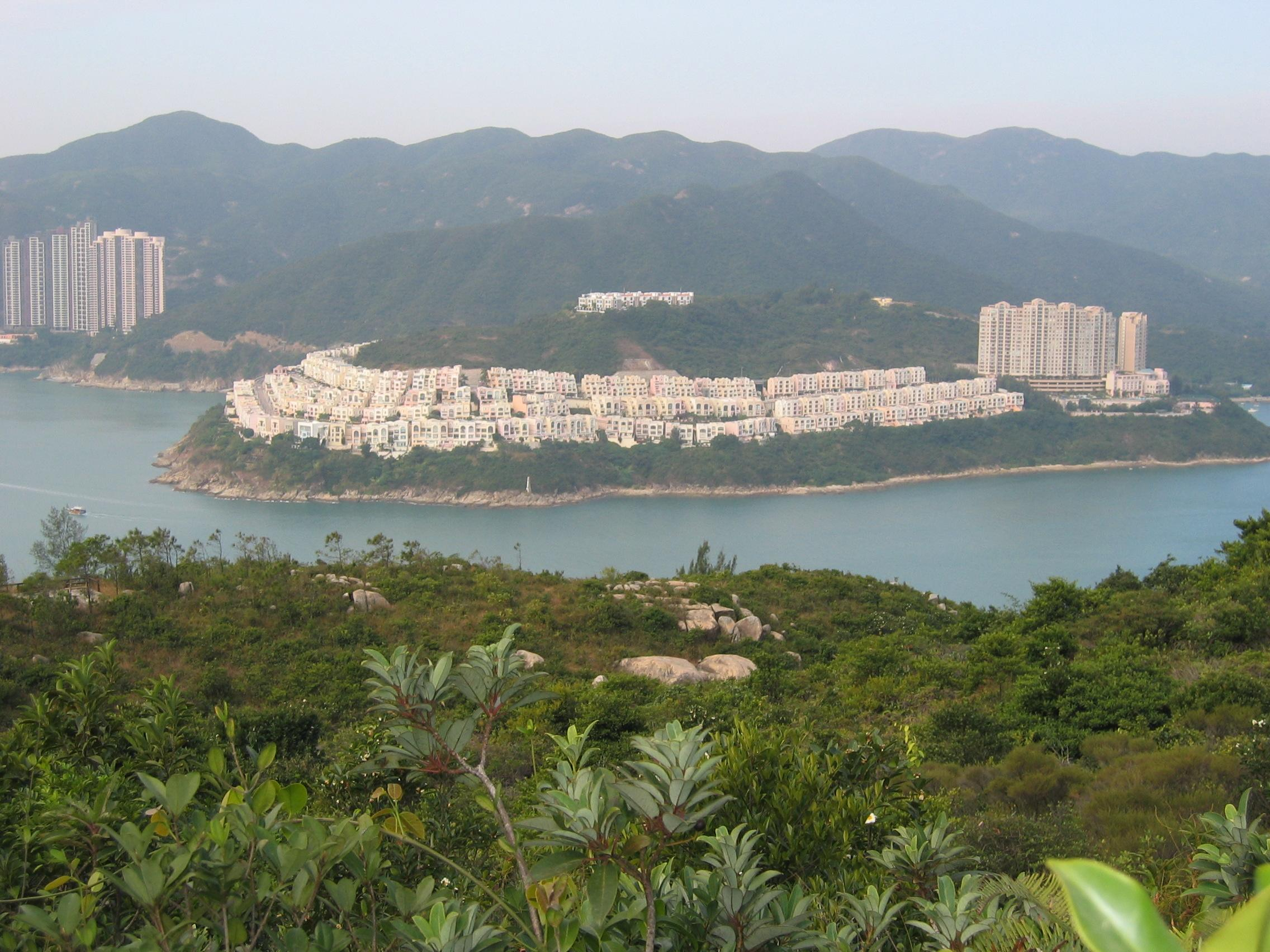
- Red Hill & environs

Highest point
- Elevation: 113 m (371 ft)
- Coordinates: 22°14′09″N 114°13′32″E

Geography
- Location within Hong Kong
- Location: Tai Tam, Southern District, Hong Kong

Red Hill (Chinese: 白筆山), also known as Pak Pat Shan, is a 113-metre (371 ft) hill located in Tai Tam, Southern District, Hong Kong.

== Residential area ==
Currently, this area primarily consists of low-rise upmarket residences, including the Redhill Peninsula, Red Hill Park, Turtle Cove, Le Palais and Villa Rosa. The summit is now occupied by a private estate and not accessible to the public.

== See also ==
- List of mountains, peaks and hills in Hong Kong
