= Stanley Bay, Hong Kong =

Stanley Bay
- 赤柱灣 (Chinese)
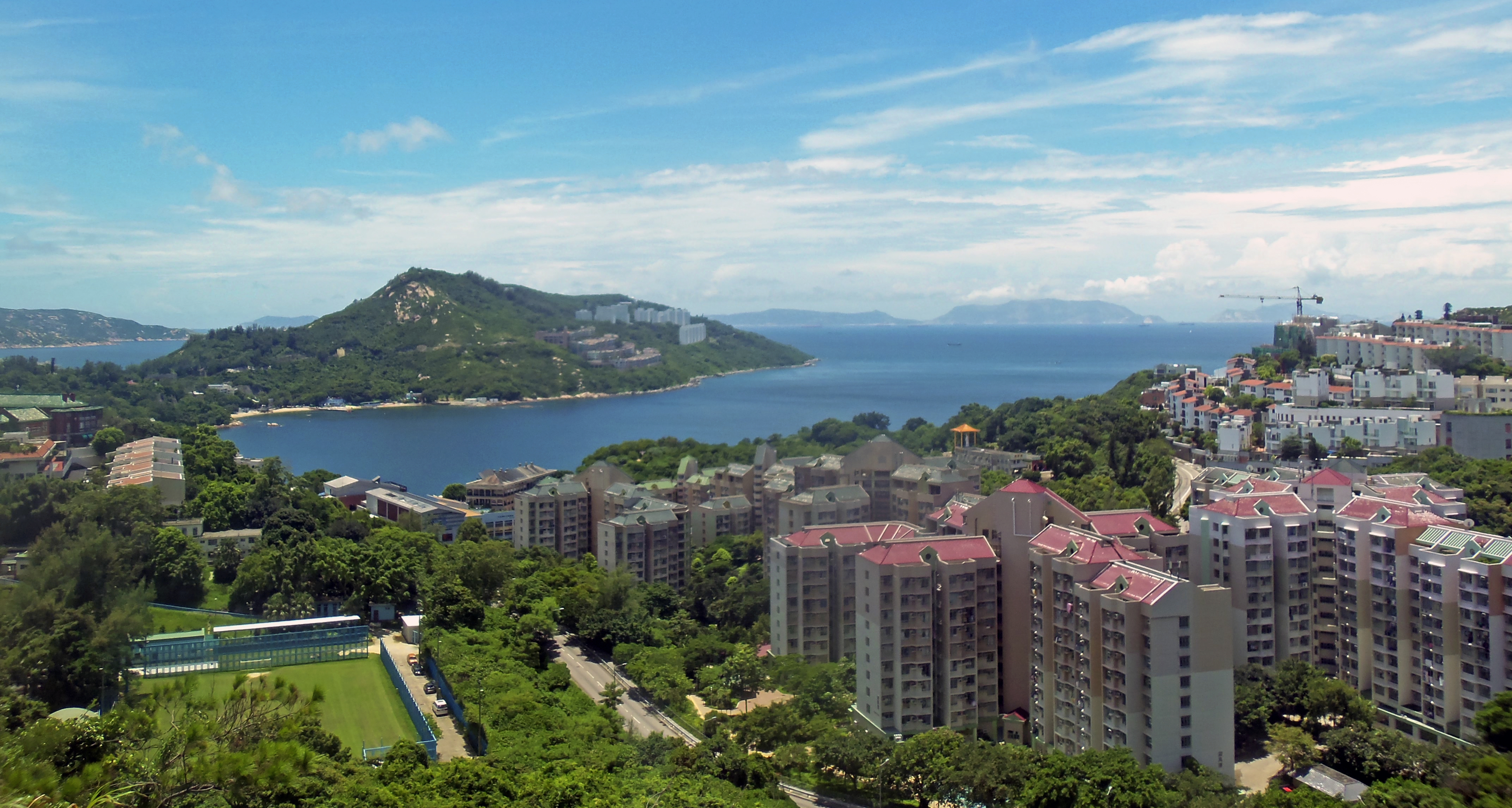
- Stanley Bay and the village of Stanley from Stanley Gap Road

- Location within Hong Kong
- Location: Hong Kong Island, Hong Kong
- Coordinates: 22.216202°N 114.211153°E
- Type: Bay
- Primary outflows: South China Sea
- Max. length: 1.5 km (0.93 mi)
- Max. width: 2 km (1.2 mi)
- Settlements: Stanley

Stanley Bay (Chinese: 赤柱灣) is a bay in the southern part of Hong Kong Island, located in the Southern District, Hong Kong.

== Geography ==
Stanley Bay is located in the south of Hong Kong Island, west of Stanley, Hong Kong and east of Chung Hom Kok.

== Features ==
- St. Stephen's Beach
- Stanley Promenade
- St. Stephen's College
- Stanley Ma Hang Park
- Murray House
- Stanley Bay Main Sewage Pumping Station

== Transport ==
Stanley Bay can be reached via Stanley Gap Road via Stanley Beach Road. Bus stop is located next to Stanley Police Station.

== See also ==
- List of places in Hong Kong
