= Stanley Main Beach =

Beach in Hong Kong Island, Hong Kong

- Beach
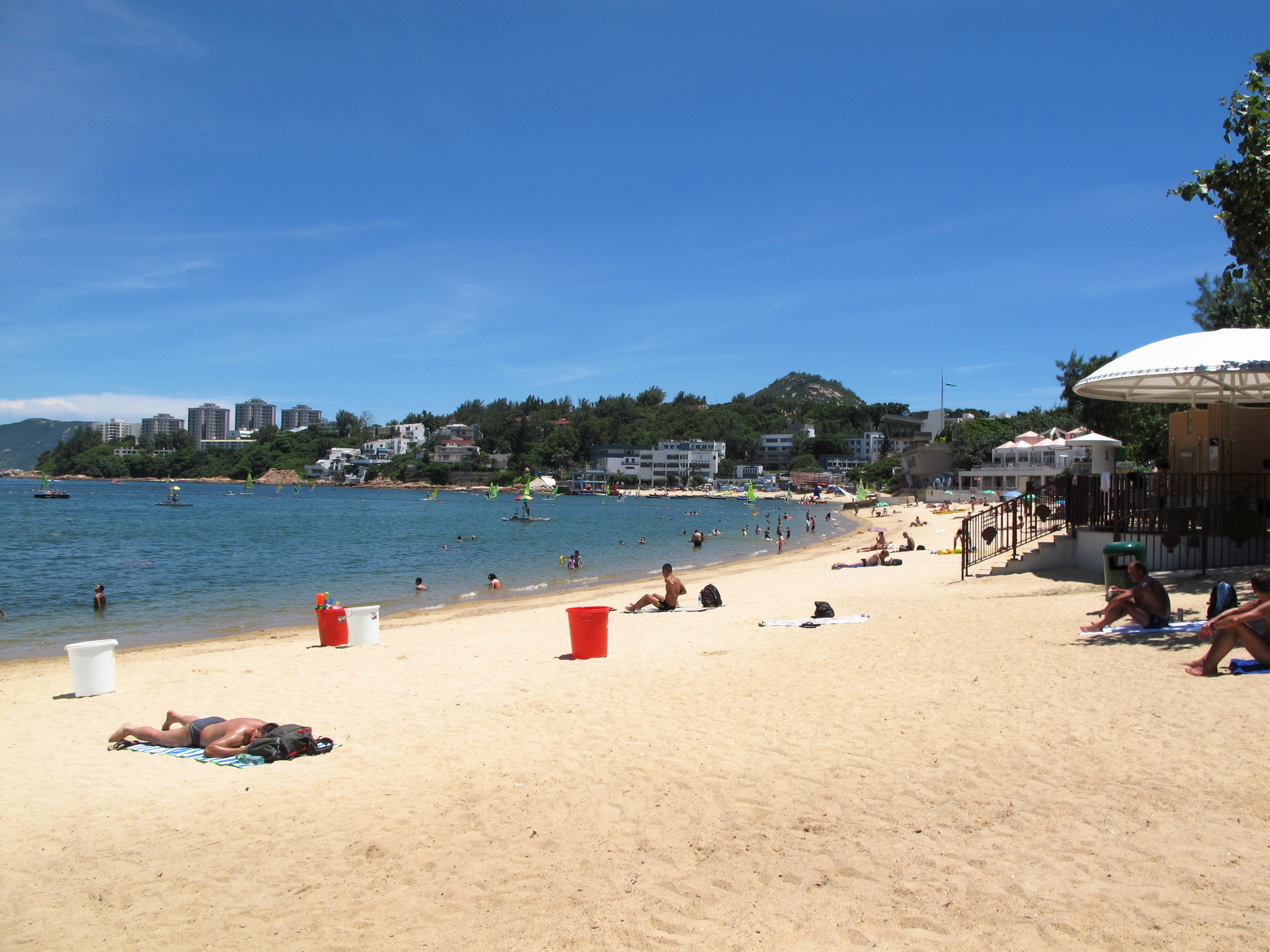
- Stanley Main Beach

- Coordinates: 22.22124°N 114.21401°E
- Location: Stanley, Hong Kong Island

Dimensions
  - Length: 194 metres
- Patrolled by: Leisure and Cultural Services Department

Stanley Main Beach
- Traditional Chinese: 赤柱正灘泳灘
- Simplified Chinese: 赤柱正滩泳滩
Transcriptions
Standard Mandarin
- Hanyu Pinyin: Chì Zhù Zhèng Tān Yǒng Tān
Yue: Cantonese
- Jyutping: cek3 cyu5 zing3 taan1 wing6 taan1

Stanley Main Beach is a gazetted beach located adjacent to Stanley Market and Stanley Back Beach in the eastern side of the Stanley peninsula, Southern District, Hong Kong. The beach has barbecue pits and is managed by the Leisure and Cultural Services Department of the Hong Kong Government. The beach is about 194 metres long and is rated as Grade 1 by the Environmental Protection Department for its water quality.

== Usage ==
The beach is a hot spot for windsurfing and other watersports, and hosts the Dragon Boat Championships every year.

== Features ==
The beach has the following features:

- BBQ pits (13 nos.)
- Changing rooms
- Showers
- Toilets
- Fast food kiosk
- Water sports centre
- Playground

== See also ==
- Beaches of Hong Kong
