= HKSM =

HKSM may refer to:

- Hong Kong Science Museum, a science museum in Tsim Sha Tsui East, Kowloon, Hong Kong
- Hong Kong Space Museum, an astronomy and space science museum in Tsim Shui Tsui, Kowloon, Hong Kong
