= Harbour City (Hong Kong) =

Shopping centre in Tsim Sha Tsui, Hong Kong

- 海港城

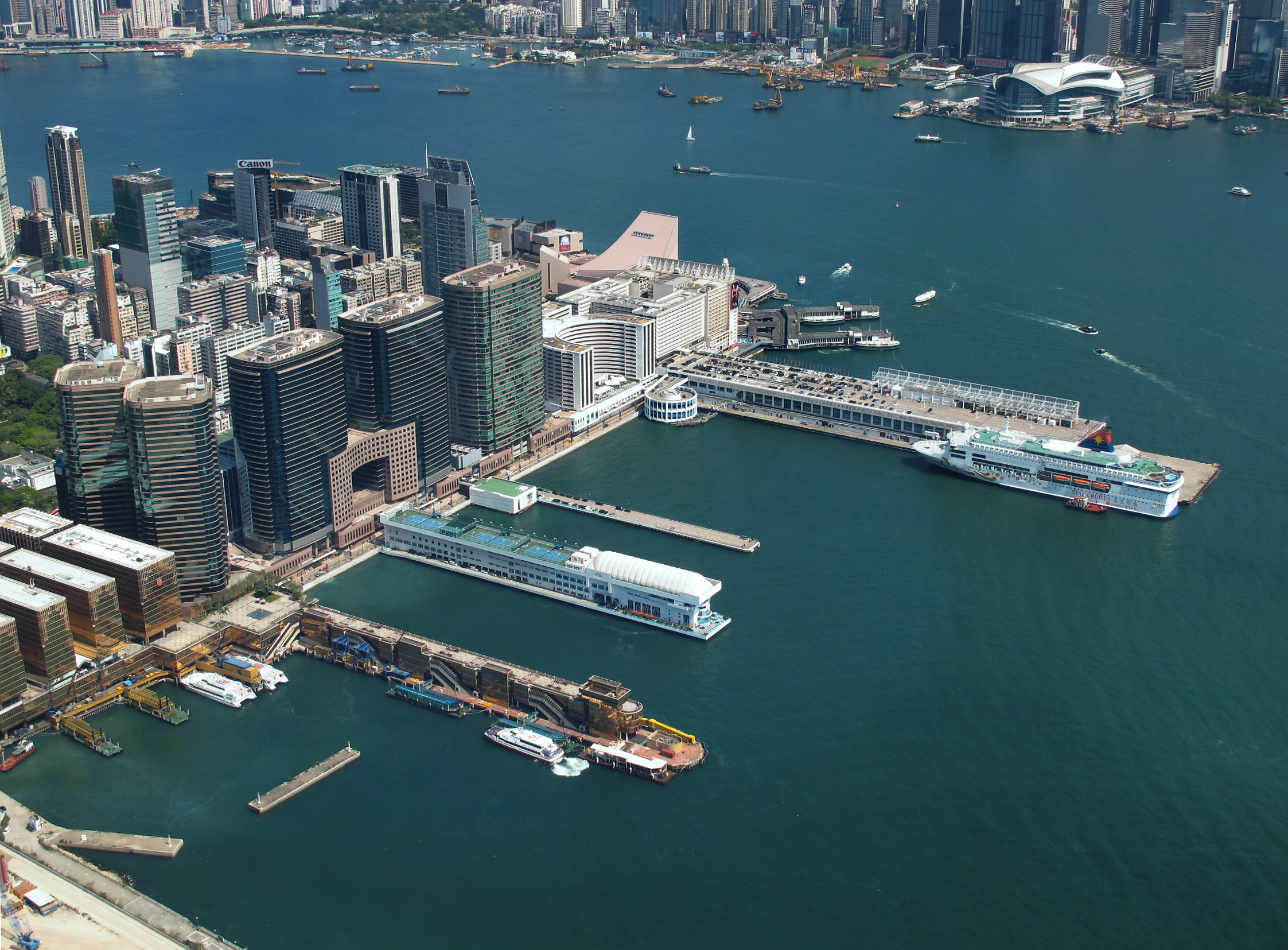

- Location within Hong Kong

General information
- Location: 3-27 Canton Road, Tsim Sha Tsui, Kowloon, Hong Kong
- Coordinates: 22°17′51″N 114°10′07″E
- Completed: 1966; 60 years ago, with additions and alterations 1969, 1977, 1983, 1999
- Renovated: 1986–1989, 2001–2003, 2012–2015
- Demolished: Ocean Gallery: 1992
- Owner: The Wharf (Holdings) Limited

Technical details
- Floor count: 4
- Floor area: 2,000,000 square feet

Harbour City
- Traditional Chinese: 海港城
- Simplified Chinese: 海港城
Transcriptions
Standard Mandarin
- Hanyu Pinyin: Hái Gǎng Chéng
Yue: Cantonese
- Jyutping: hoi2 gong2 sing4

Map of Harbour City

Harbour City is a shopping centre in Tsim Sha Tsui, Kowloon, Hong Kong. It occupies the lower levels of a series of office blocks and hotels, comprising several parts: Marco Polo Hotels, Ocean Terminal, Ocean Centre, the Gateway and the Pacific Club Kowloon. The complex is located along the west side of Canton Road, stretching from Star House and the Star Ferry Pier in the south to China Hong Kong City in the north.

Harbour City is the largest shopping centre in Hong Kong. It is developed and owned by The Wharf (Holdings) Limited group. The mall covers an area of approximately 2 million square feet, including 70 restaurants, 1 large cinema, an art gallery, observation deck and about 450 retail stores. The office portion of Harbour City covers an area of 4.6 million square feet spread across 10 commercial buildings. The total area of the complex is 8.41 million square feet, which includes three luxury hotels, a 500-room serviced apartment (Gateway Apartments), a private club (Pacific Club) and 2,000 parking spaces.

The complex was a redevelopment of the existing Kowloon Wharves and completed in multiple phases. The earliest portion, Ocean Terminal, was completed in 1966 as a shopping centre with a passenger terminal servicing cruise ships. The entire complex gradually took shape throughout the 1980s.

Due to its size and number of shops, approximately 300,000 people visit the shopping centre during the weekends, including local residents and tourists from mainland China and abroad. Over 60,000 people also work in the office buildings above the shopping centre.

The mall has a small venue for performances and exhibitions. Every Saturday and Sunday, the mall invites bands and local musicians to perform in their "Music in the City" event.

There is usually a festive atmosphere during Christmas and Lunar Year Festivals, with decorations mainly located near the entrance of the Tsim Sha Tsui Star Ferry pier.

== History ==
Harbour City is built on the site of the Hongkong and Kowloon Wharf and Godown, one of colonial Hong Kong's original commercial wharfage and dockside warehousing complexes. Harbour City is still owned by The Wharf (Holdings) Limited (九龍倉集團), or Wharf (九倉) in short, a company founded in 1886 in Hong Kong. The company's original business was in running wharfage and dockside warehousing, and it was originally known as The Hong Kong and Kowloon Wharf and Godown Company, limited and founded by Sir Paul Chater. The company adopted its current name in 1986. The current major holder of the company is Wheelock & Co., which was formed in 1886 to operate the godown but has since grown to be a major commercial force in Hong Kong.

== Features ==
The mall features many branded boutiques, such as Louis Vuitton, Dior, Loewe, Tiffany & Co., Fendi, Celine, Berluti, Kenzo, Brooks Brothers, Uniqlo, Maison Francis Kurkdjian, Givenchy, Salvatore Ferragamo, Shiatzy Chen, Prada, Yves Saint Laurent, Guerlain, Polo Ralph Lauren, Versace, Burberry, and Hugo Boss.

It is home to the largest Toys "R" Us location in Hong Kong, and there is a large Lane Crawford in the Ocean Terminal portion of the mall. The 3rd floor of Ocean Terminal was converted in the early 2000s into LCX, a collection of retailers targeted at younger shoppers. Cova and c!ty'super are also located in Harbour City.

== In popular culture ==
In Top of the Lake season 2, Detective Griffin (played by Elisabeth Moss) was to investigate a case in Harbour City. (Shooting was set to begin in December 2015.)
