= Kowloon Public Pier =

Public pier in Kowloon, Hong Kong

Coordinates: 22°17′34.8″N 114°10′10.6″E

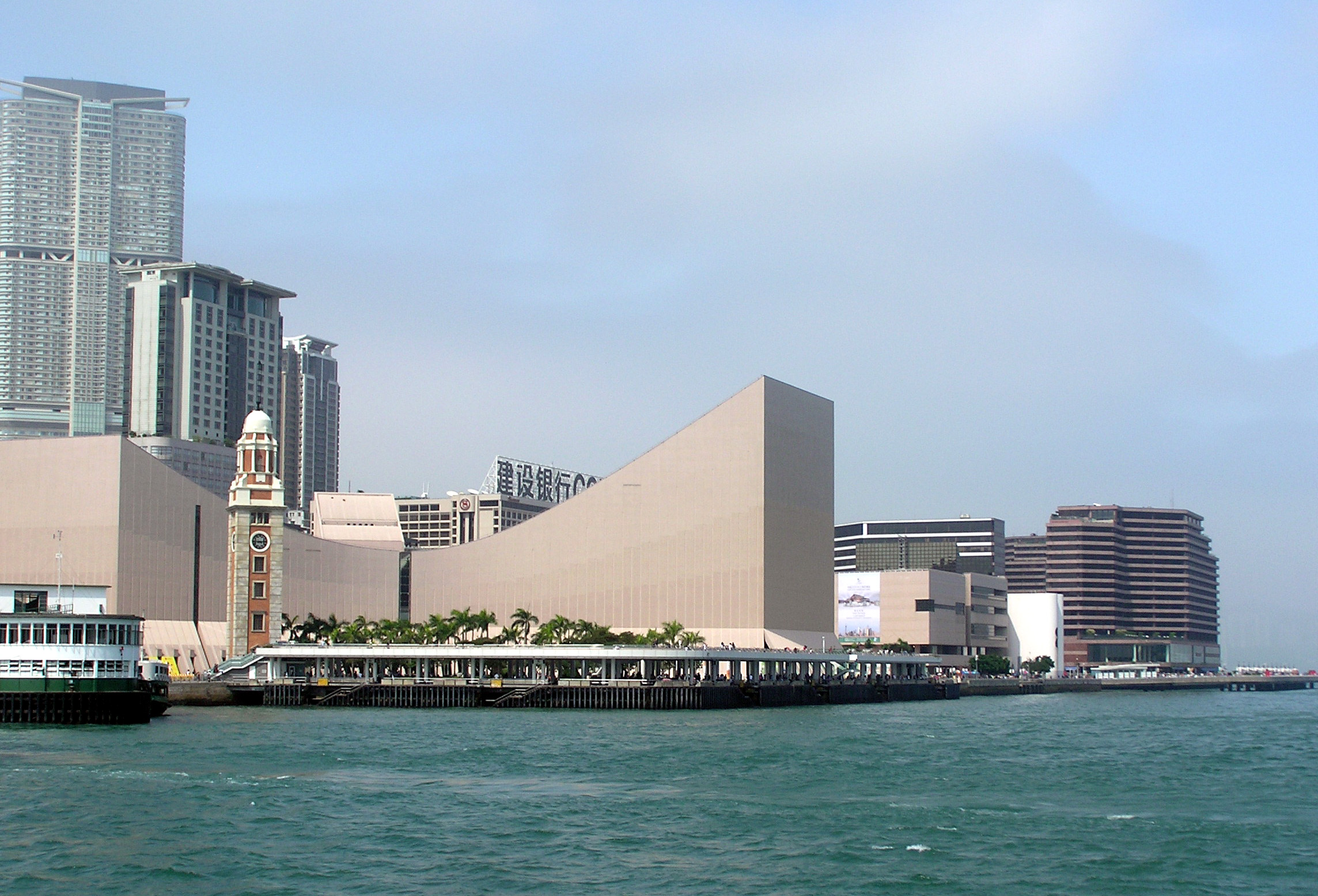
Kowloon Public Pier. The white and green pier on the left is the Tsim Sha Tsui Ferry Pier.

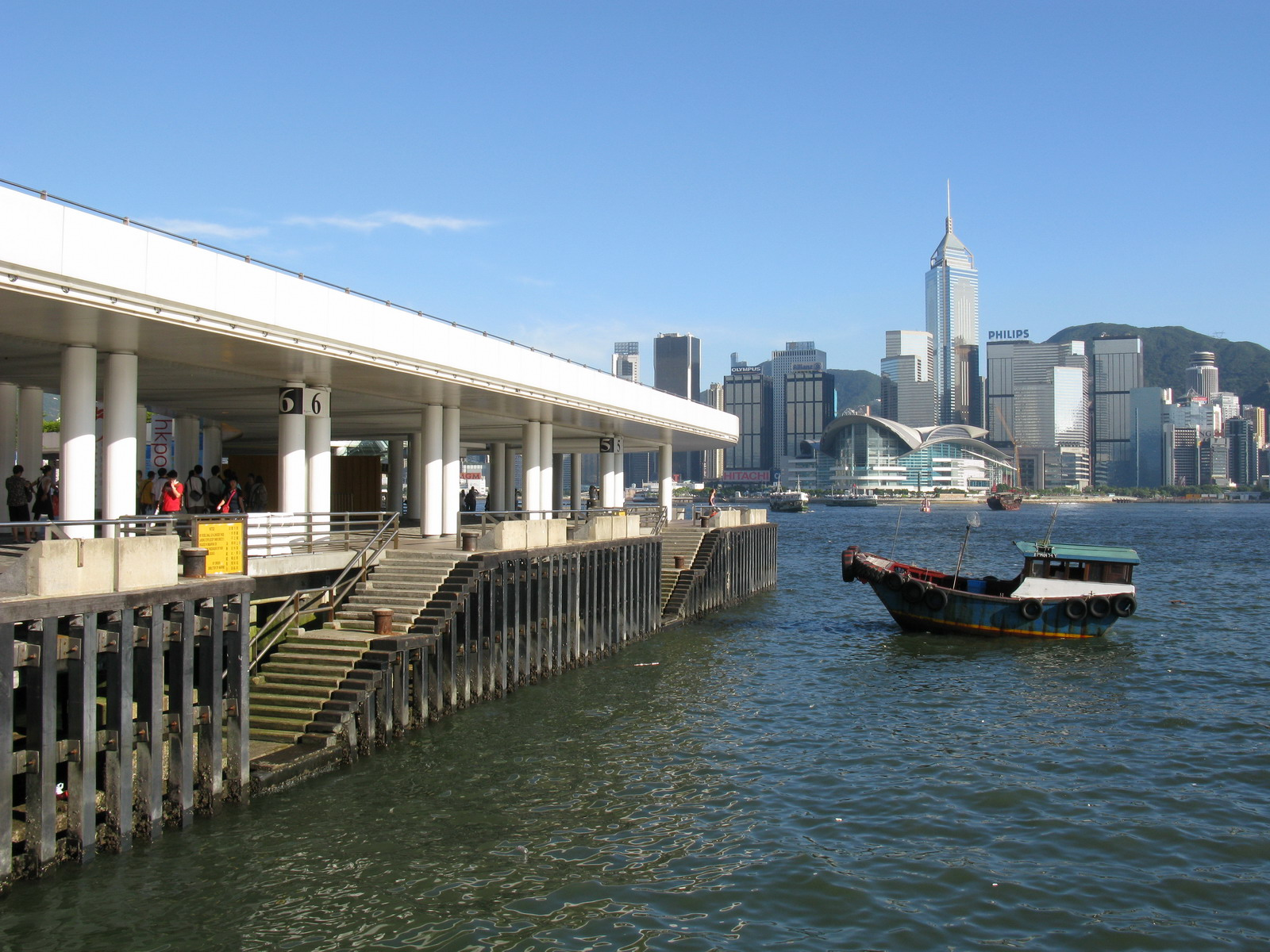
Western part of Kowloon Public Pier

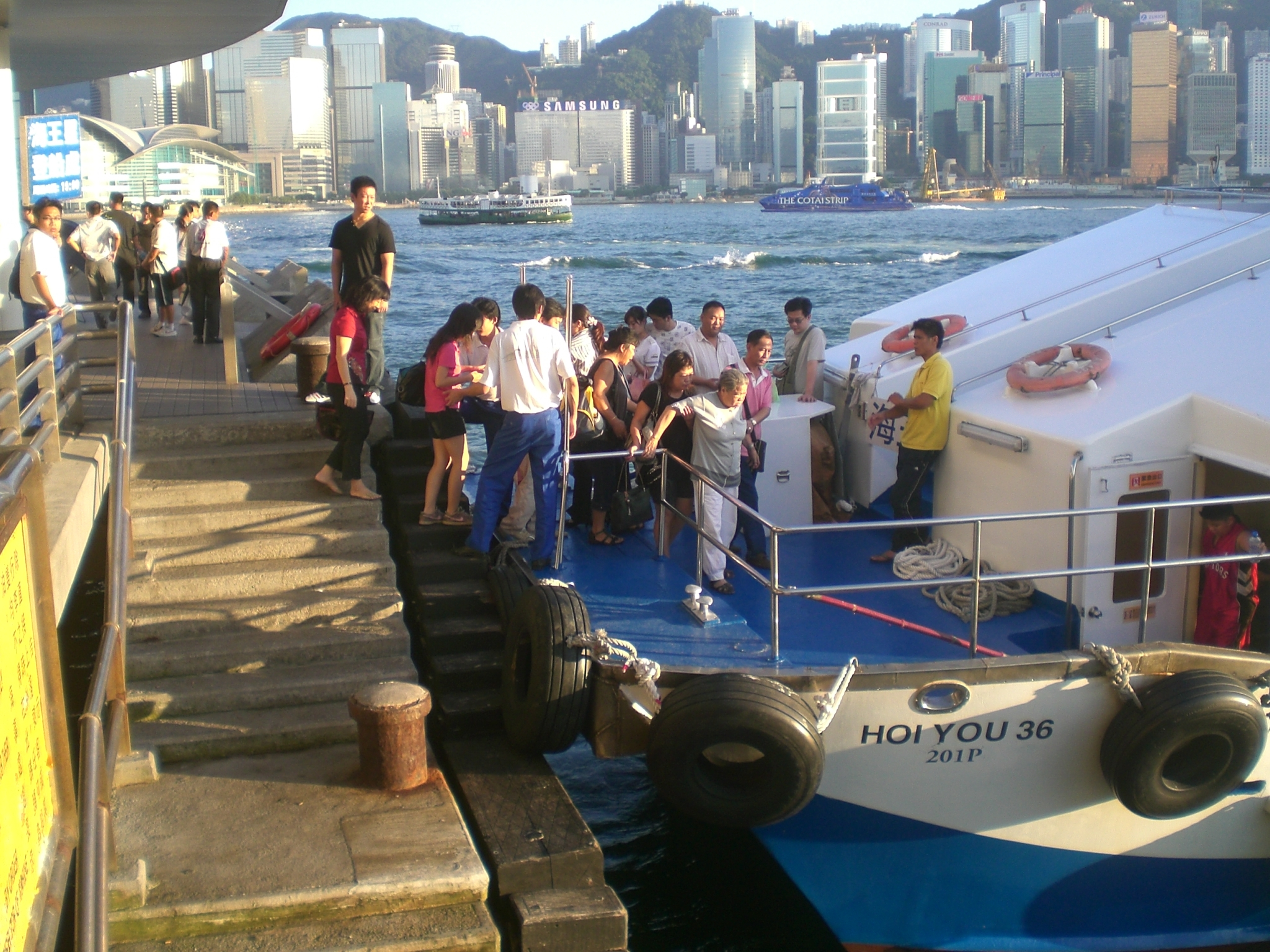
Passengers boarding a boat at the pier

Kowloon Public Pier (Chinese: 九龍公眾碼頭) or Tsim Sha Tsui Public Pier (Chinese: 尖沙咀公眾碼頭) is a public pier in Tsim Sha Tsui, Kowloon, Hong Kong. It approaches Hong Kong Cultural Centre and Victoria Harbour. Any boat can freely park at the pier.

It is south of the Clock Tower and south-west of the Hong Kong Cultural Centre. The Tsim Sha Tsui Ferry Pier is north-west of it.

== History ==
Kowloon Public Pier was a public pier outside Tsim Sha Tsui KCR station. Before the Cross-Harbour Tunnel and Star Ferry were in use, residents on Hong Kong Island took walla-wallas to the pier and interchanged to take the train at Tsim Sha Tsui KCR station to travel to New Territories and Mainland China.

== Olympic Torch Relay ==
Kowloon Public Pier was one of the stops of Olympic torch relay activities in Hong Kong during 1964 Tokyo Olympics and 2008 Beijing Olympics.
