= Ocean Terminal =

Ocean Terminal is a common name for passenger terminals and may refer to:

- Ocean Terminal, Edinburgh
- Ocean Terminal (1950-1980) at Southampton docks, demolished 1983
- Ocean Terminal (2009-present) at Southampton docks, opened 2009
- Ocean Terminal, Greenock
- Ocean Terminal, Hong Kong
- Ocean Terminal (film), a British Transport Film
