= Hong Kong Space Museum =

- 香港太空館

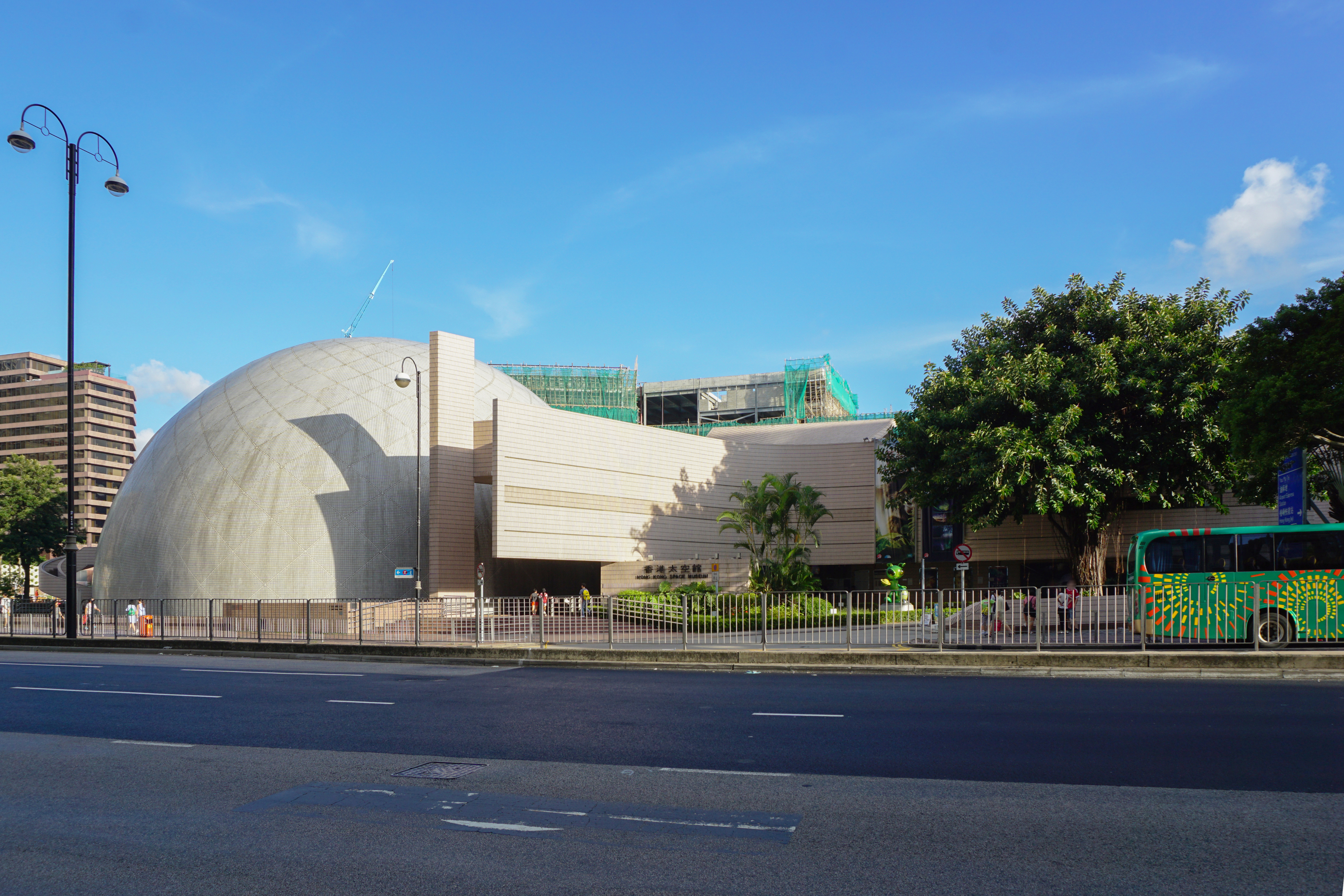
- Image of the museum, with the planetarium (left) and the main building (right)
- Established: 8 October 1980; 45 years ago
- Location: 10 Salisbury Road, Tsim Sha Tsui, Kowloon, Hong Kong
- Coordinates: 22.294353°N 114.171869°E
- Type: Aerospace museum
- Visitors: 590,000
- Curator: Dr. So Chu-wing
- Owner: Leisure and Cultural Services Department
- Public transit access: Tsim Sha Tsui station (Exit E); East Tsim Sha Tsui station (Exit J)
- Website: hk.space.museum

Hong Kong Space Museum
- Traditional Chinese: 香港太空館
Transcriptions
Yue: Cantonese
- Yale Romanization: Hēung góng taai hūng gún
- Jyutping: Hoeng1 gong2 taai3 hung1 gun2

The Hong Kong Space Museum is a public astronomy and space science museum located in Tsim Sha Tsui, Hong Kong. Opened on 8 October 1980, it is managed by the Leisure and Cultural Services Department of the Hong Kong Government. The building is notable for its hemispherical shape, which contains a planetarium, the only one in Hong Kong. The main facilities of the museum are located in a building next to the planetarium, showcasing information about the Solar System, cosmology, and spaceflight.

Accessible from Salisbury Road, it is adjacent to the Hong Kong Cultural Centre, the Hong Kong Museum of Art, and the Tsim Sha Tsui Clock Tower. The Hong Kong Science Museum and the Hong Kong Museum of History are also located in Tsim Sha Tsui.

== History ==
The idea of a planetarium was originally proposed in 1961 by the Urban Council. Ten years later, the Urban Services Department (USD) set up a working group to study overseas experience in establishing planetariums. The study was aimed at laying the groundwork for setting up the future Hong Kong Space Museum. The Hong Kong Government decided to build the museum at Tsim Sha Tsui and invited Mr. Joseph Liu to serve as Planetarium Advisor. In 1974, The USD signed a contract with the Carl Zeiss Company to purchase a planetarium and other equipment with a price of HK$3,050,000. Construction commenced in 1977 and the museum opened on 8 October 1980. The museum contained the world's first computerized planetarium. In the 2008-2009 financial year, there were about 590,000 visits to the museum.

In 2015, in order to carry out renovation work, the exhibition hall in the Sky Hall was closed on 5 October and reopened on 25 April 2018.

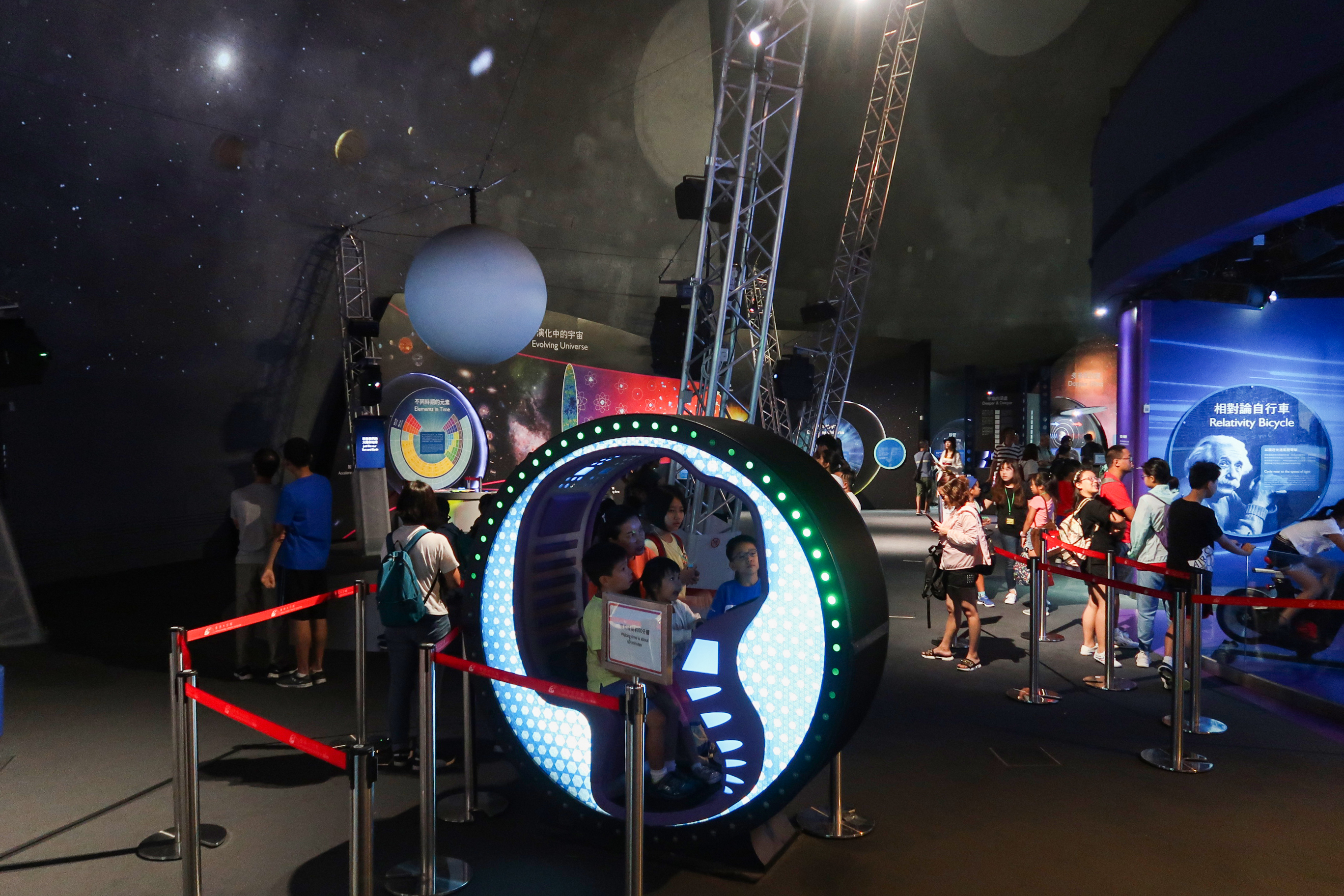
Hall of the Cosmos

=== Renovation ===
In November 2008, the Hong Kong Space Museum spent 34 million HKD on the first major overhaul of the planetarium since it opened in 1980. The major overhaul mainly involved the installation of a new digital planetarium projection system, a high-resolution projection system that is only available in a few space museums from other parts of the world. Not only can the system play 3D shows and movies on the hemispherical projection dome inside the space museum, but it is also capable of simulating scenes of stars, planets, and other celestial objects from anywhere in the universe, either in real time or at a past point in time. The 300 seats in the planetarium were also replaced with ones that spot a multilingual interactive feature. The wireless Bluetooth headsets and the newly designed display unit installed on the armrest of each seat allow the audience to send short messages to each other, participate in real-time games, answer audience satisfaction surveys, and perform a number of other activities.

From 17 November 2008 to June 2009, the planetarium was closed for renovation. It reopened on 1 July 2009 with the new digital planetarium projection system installed, which was manufactured by American company Sky-Skan Inc and boasts a resolution of over 53 million pixels, matched globally only by the projection system in the Beijing Planetarium.

The Hong Kong Space Museum's planetarium also had all of its seats replaced by a French company. The new seats, which are equipped with an interactive system that supports multiple languages, can be reclined for a better viewing angle inside the projection dome. Also, the audience can view not only the night sky as simulated from the surface of the earth, but also that as simulated from the surface of the other planets in the solar system. In the night sky, the shapes of different constellations can be seen, and the changes in polar nights from outer space can also be tracked.

As a result of another renovation project, the Stanley Ho Space Theatre and the Lecture Hall were closed between 1 November 2015 and 1 March 2016. They had since reopened.

On 1 May 2020, during the height of the COVID-19 pandemic in Hong Kong, the Hong Kong Space Museum replaced the dome projection screen in the planetarium to improve image quality.

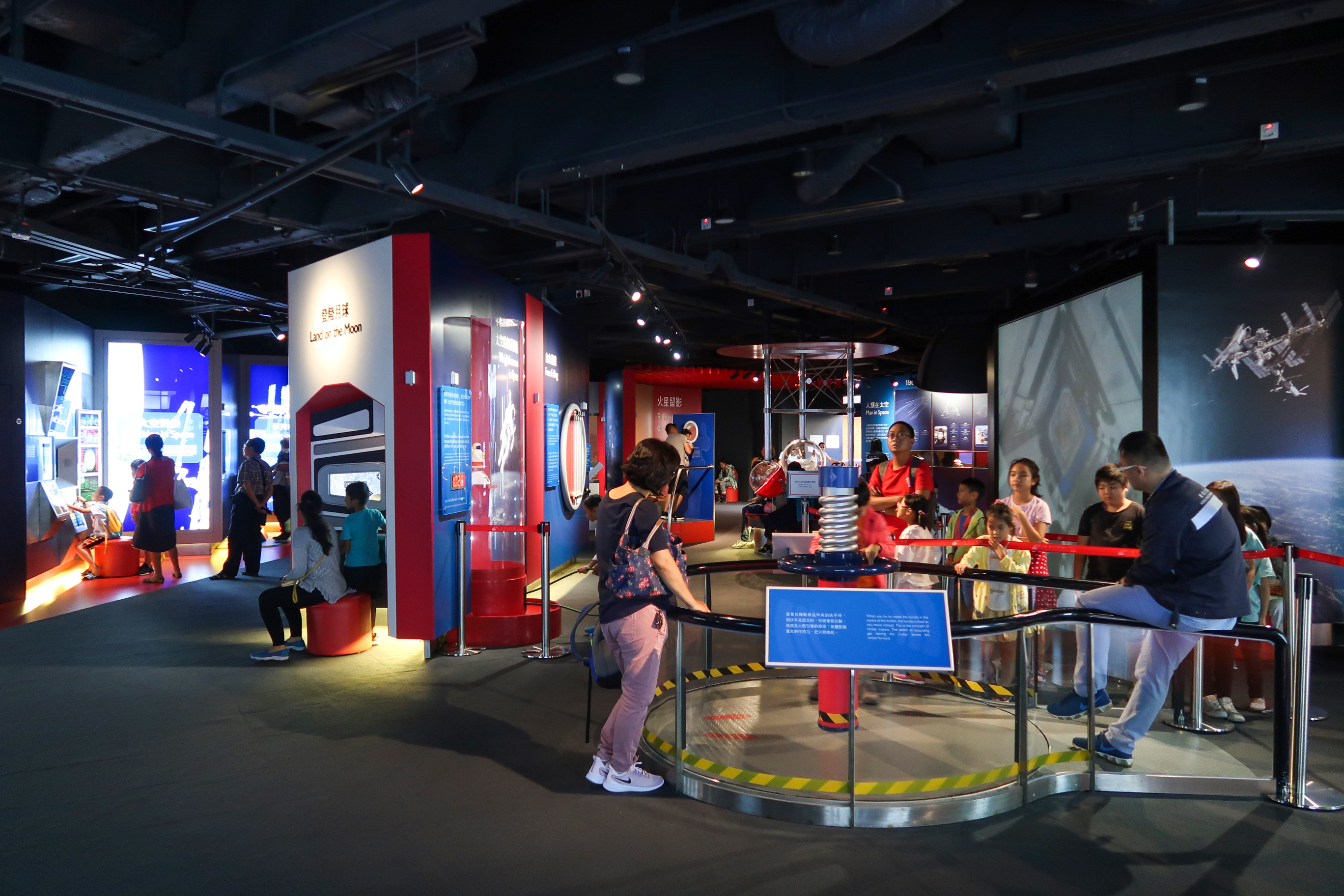
Hall of Space Exploration

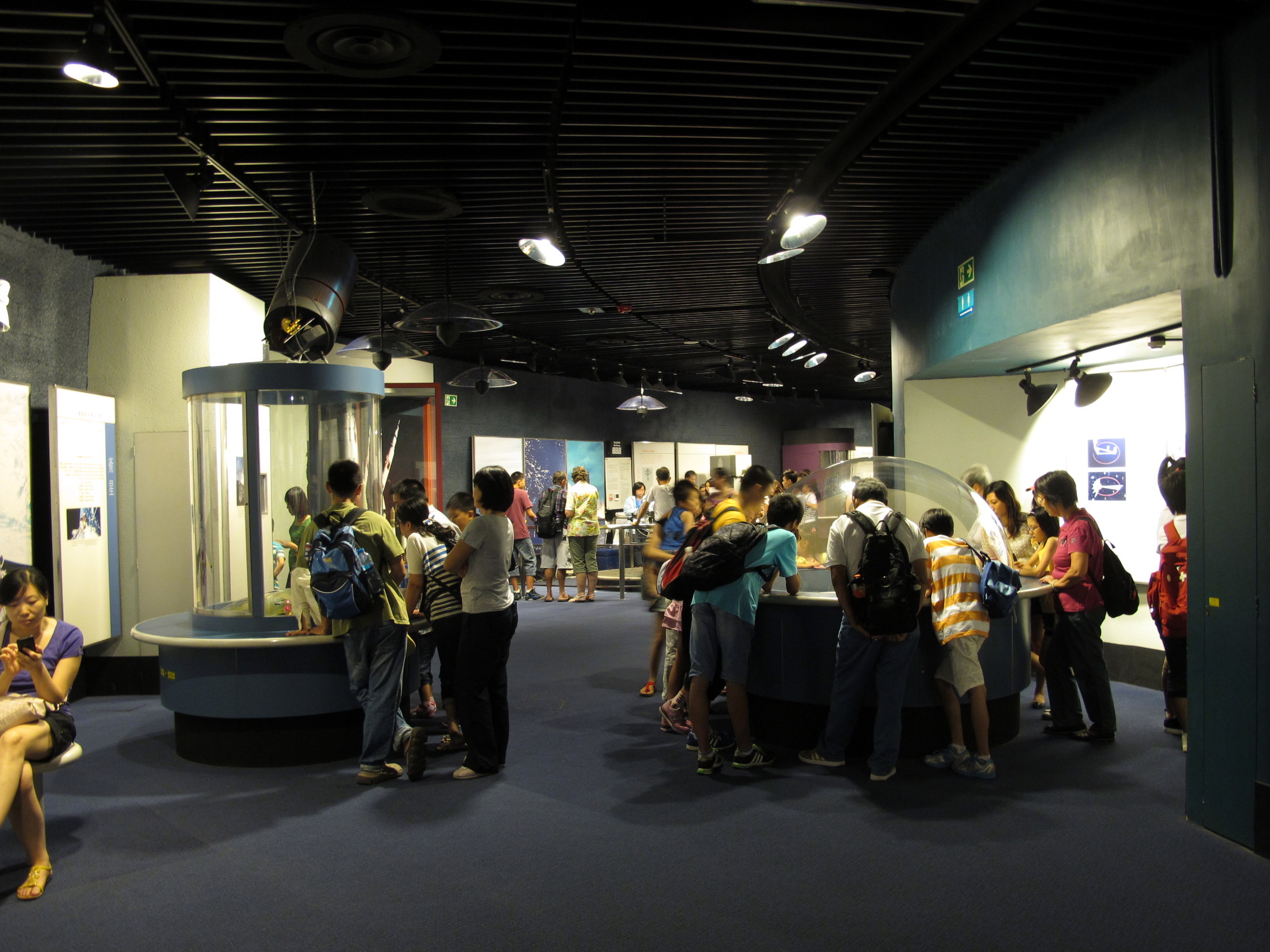
Hall of Space Science in 2012, due to renovation, it closed in 2015

==== The Exhibition Halls ====
There was a plan to renovate the two exhibition halls at a cost of 32 million HKD. Under the renovation plan, which would last half a year, the themes of the exhibition hall on the first floor would be space exploration and the effects of solar activities on earth, and the exhibition hall would provide visitors with a surreal science fiction experience. However, by May 2013, the Space Museum had yet to carry out the renovation work. The Leisure and Cultural Services Department said that it had planned to start the renovation in mid-2015 and finish it by the end of the year, during which the exhibition halls would close but shows would still continue as usual in the planetarium.

In September 2015, the Leisure and Cultural Services Department announced that the two exhibition halls, which had been in use since 1991, would undergo renovation beginning on 5 October that year. The renovated exhibition halls would be renamed "Hall of the Cosmos" and "Hall of Space Exploration" respectively. Visitors would be offered a novel experience in which they could learn about the evolution of the universe, the exploration of the solar system and beyond, and more. The renovation was finally completed in 2018, and the exhibition halls reopened on 25 April that year.

=== 2019 protests ===
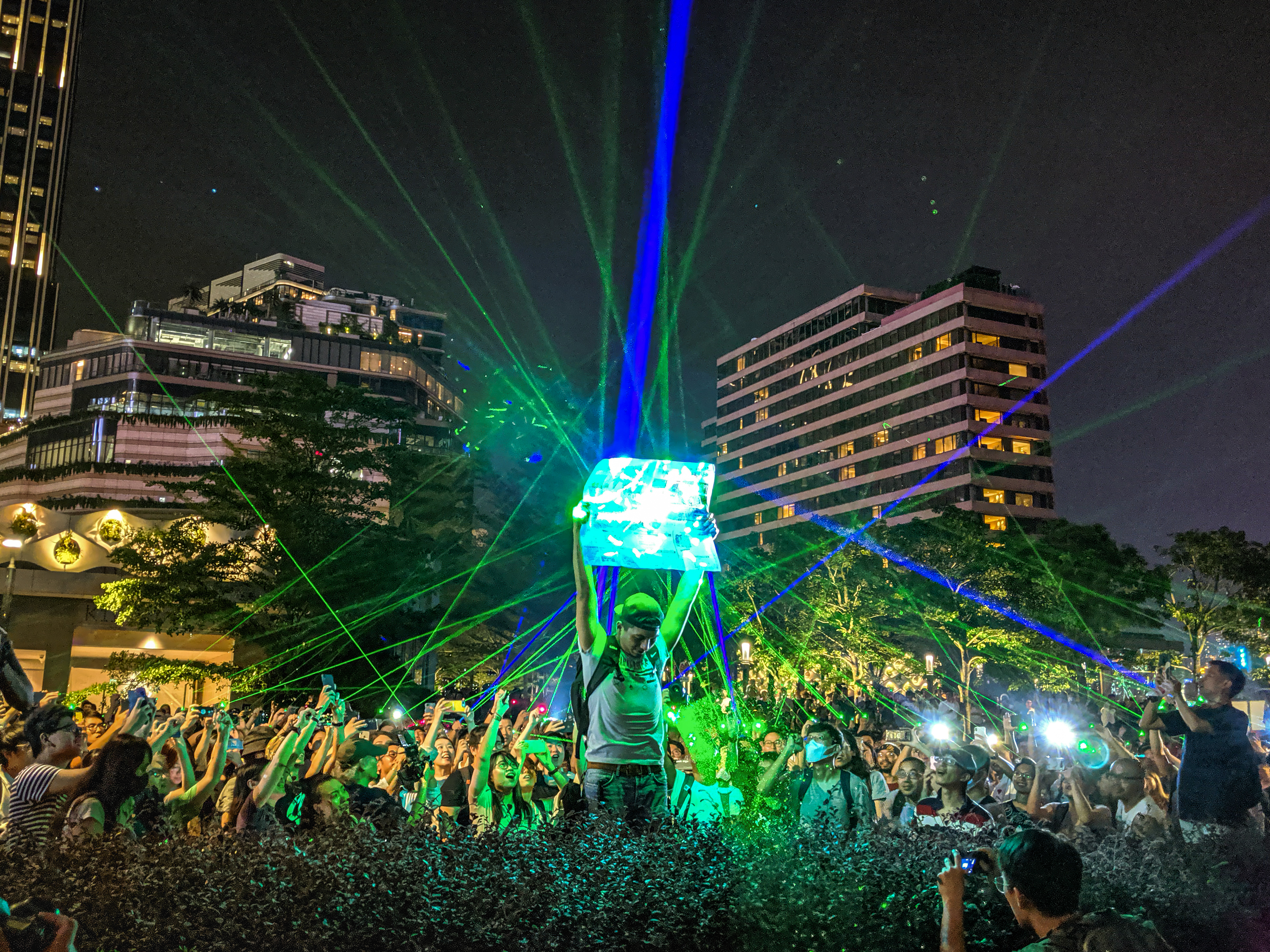
To "verify" the police's claim that laser pointers are dangerous weapons, a number of protestors point theirs at newspapers. The newspapers do not catch fire and then the protestors keep shouting "The newspapers are not on fire!" and "The police are lying!"

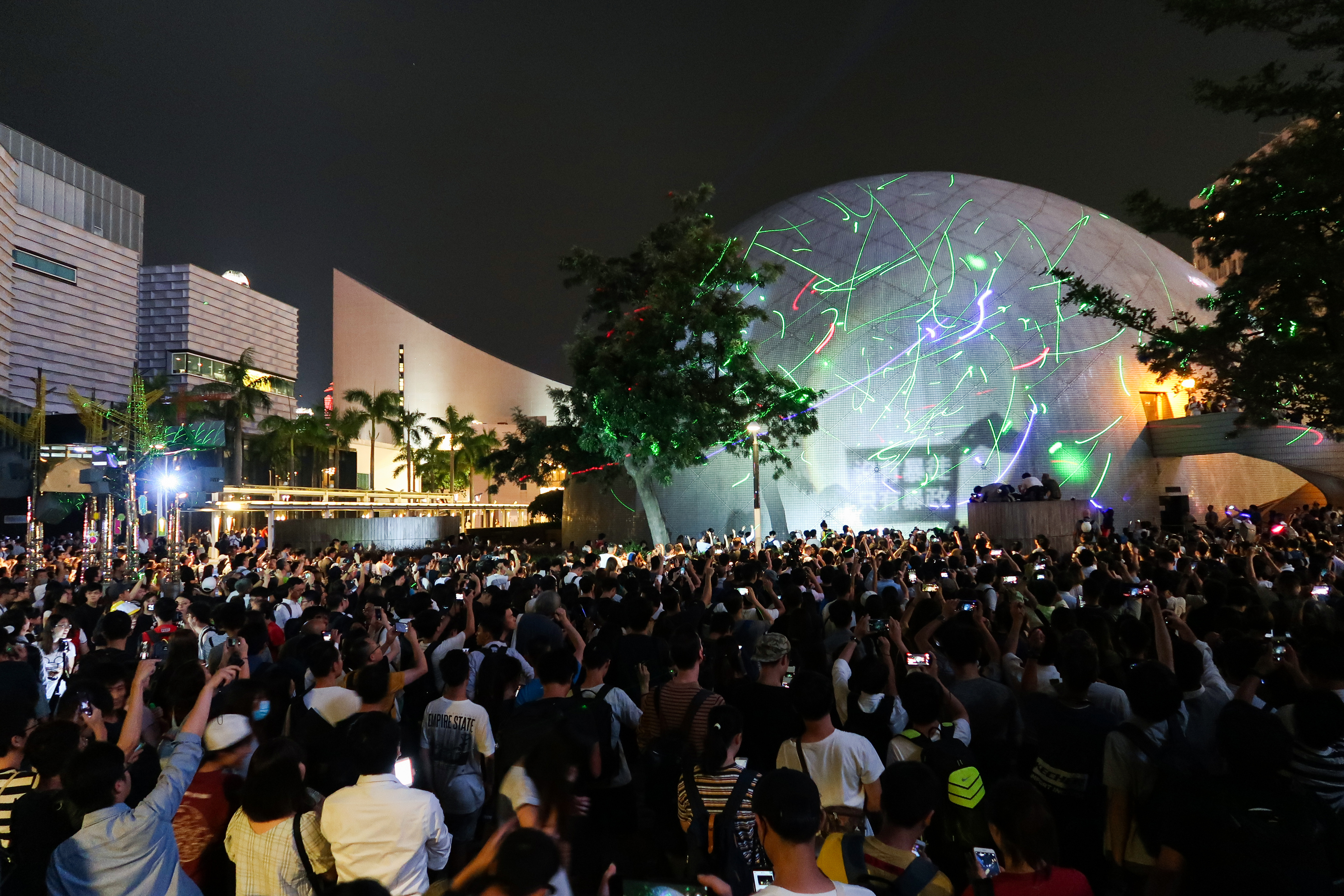
Thousands of protestors gather outside the Space Museum, shining their laser pointers at the Stanley Ho Space Theatre and the trees planted in front of it, and then using a projector to display their slogans.

In 2019, following the proposal of the Fugitive Offenders Amendment Bill by the Hong Kong government, the Anti-Extradition Law Amendment Bill Movement was triggered, and protests erupted all over the city. On 6 August, the then president of Hong Kong Baptist University Students' Union Keith Fong Chung-yin was arrested by undercover police for possession of offensive or lethal weapons after buying laser pointers in Sham Shui Po. Responding to the arrest, Fong said that he was just buying the laser points for his friends and leaving one for himself for stargazing, and that when he was buying the laser points, he was not aware they could be used as a weapon.

On 7 August, the police said during a press conference that the laser pointers Fong had bought, which were 18 centimetres long, had a power output of 100 mW, high enough to classify them as weapons by law. To prove that the laser pointers Fong had bought could cause bodily harm, the police ignited some newspapers with them in front of the public. As the laser pointers Fong had bought were seen as "stargazing pointers" and could indeed be used for stargazing, a "Stargazing Event" was organized that very same night in front of the Space Museum, with thousands of people taking part to protest against Fong's "arbitrary" arrest. During the event, some protestors shone their laser pointers at the walls of the Space Museum's Stanley Ho Space Theatre, the trees that were planted in front of it, and the walls of the adjacent buildings. They also sang songs to mock the police for using laser points to ignite the newspapers.

== Exhibits ==
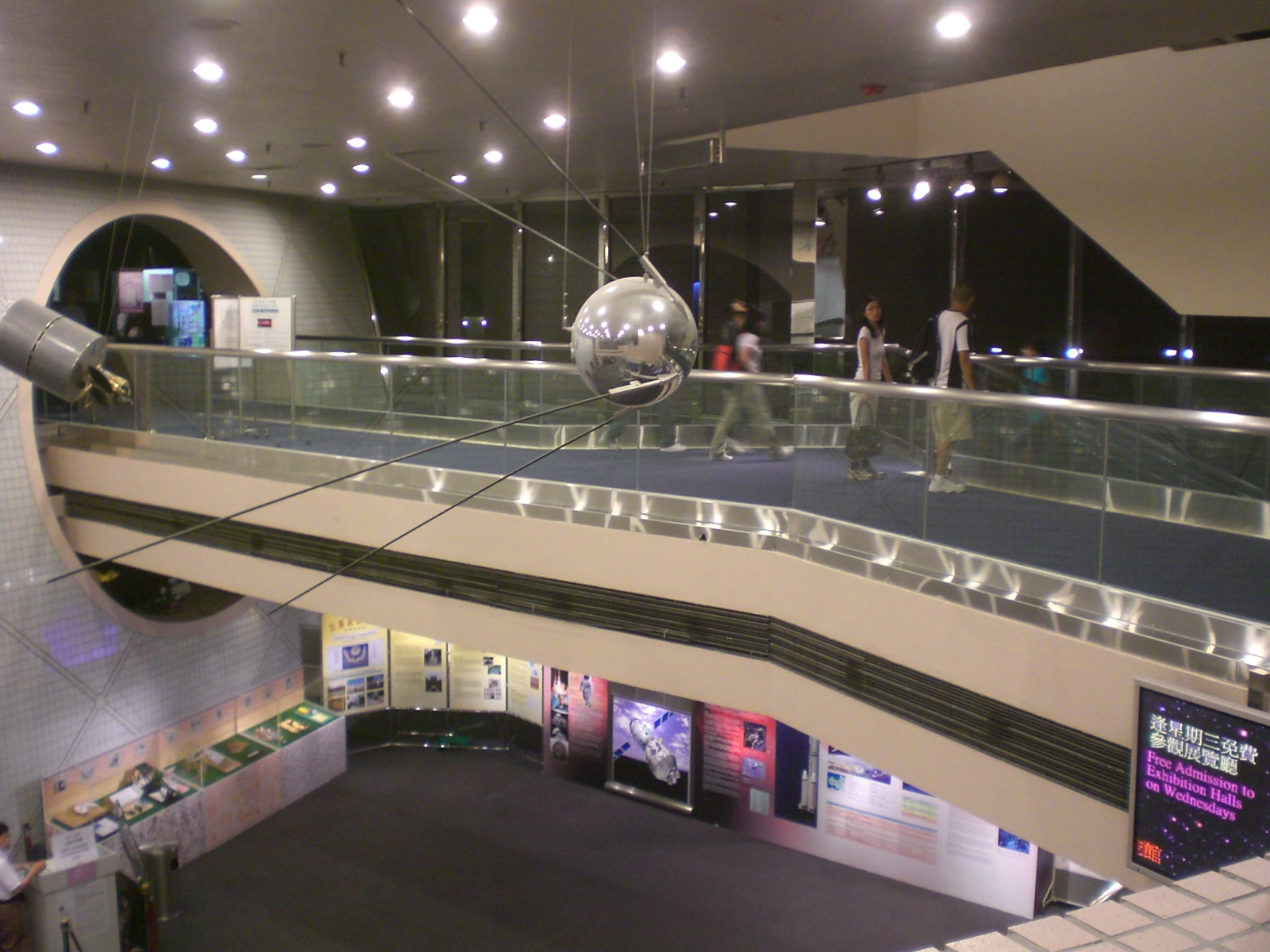
Museum lobby

Hong Kong Space Museum has two thematic exhibition halls: the Hall of Space Science and the Hall of Astronomy on the ground and first floors respectively. The exhibits, predominantly interactive, enable visitors to learn through a series of entertaining and educational experiences.

Because most of the exhibits in the Space Museum are interactive ones, it has a relatively small number of exhibits of historical value. However, since 2019, the museum has had 17 such exhibits. From 1981, the museum started buying meteorites such as iron meteorites, pallasites and tektites. In 1983, the Space Museum acquired an Indian astrolabe. In May 2000, a flag of Hong Kong that was placed inside Shenzhou 1, the first unmanned Shenzhou spacecraft from China, was also put on display in the museum. In July the same year, the certificate which named Minor Planet 3297 Hong Kong was also put on display. In 2017, Yang Liwei, the first person sent into space by the Chinese space program, donated his work uniform to the Space Museum.

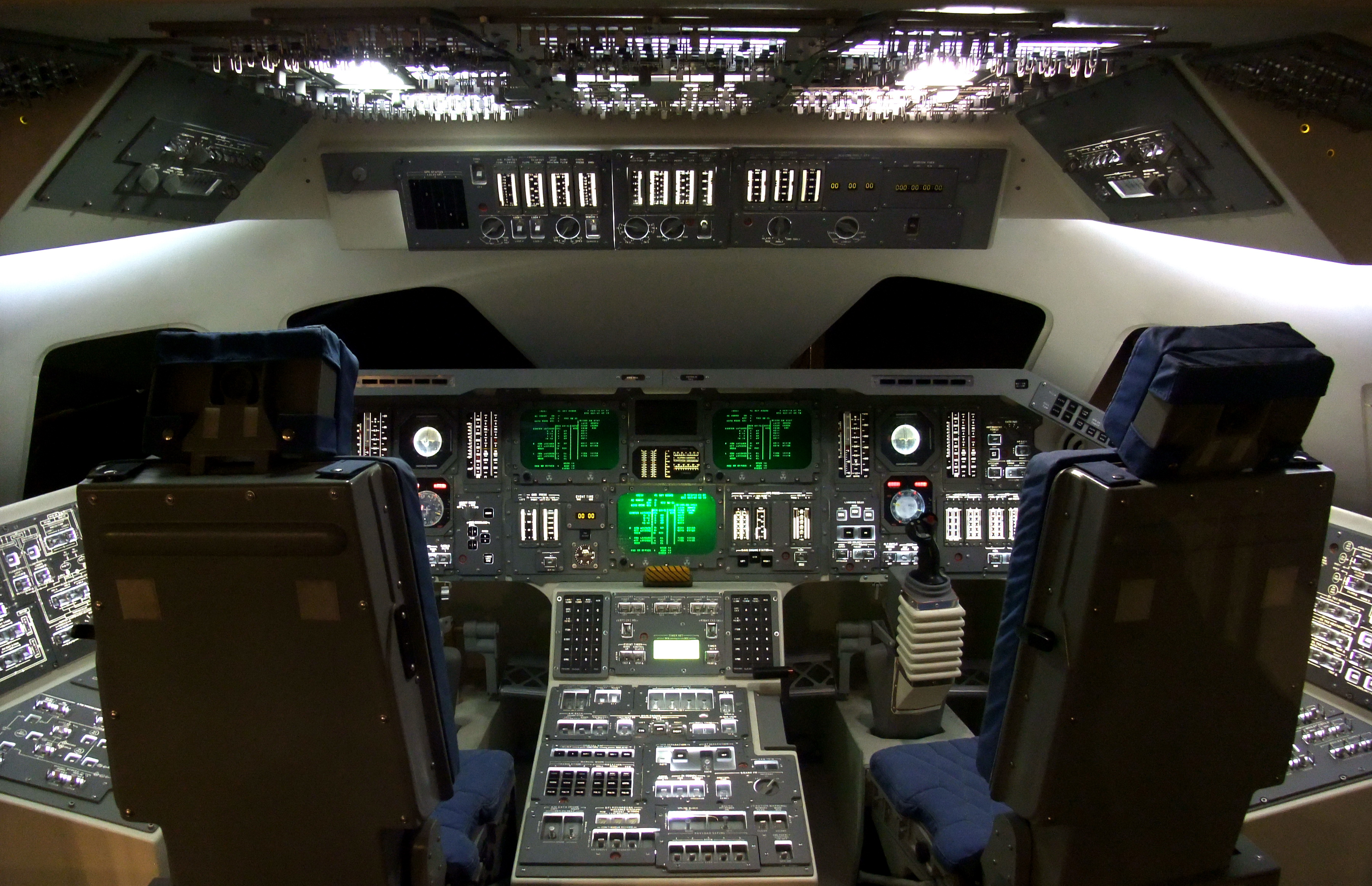
A one-on-one scale model of a Space Shuttle cockpit with the control system was once on display in the Space Museum. It was removed after the renovation in September 2015.

== Facilities ==
The museum has two wings: east wing and west wing. The former consists of the nucleus of the museum's planetarium, which has an egg-shaped dome structure. Beneath it is the Stanley Ho Space Theatre, the Hall of Space Science, workshops and offices. The west wing houses the Hall of Astronomy, the Lecture Hall, a gift shop and offices.

The planetarium's egg-shaped dome covers more than 8,000 square metres (86,000 sq ft), making it a famous landmark in Hong Kong. It was the first local planetarium for the popularisation of astronomy and space science. The computerized star imager in the Sky Gallery of the Space Museum is capable of simulating the sky through optical principles, projecting 8,000 stars onto the hemisphere screen of the Planetarium.

There is also a mock-up of the nose and cockpit section of the Space Shuttle orbiter.

== Criticisms ==
In 2006, the Leisure and Cultural Services Department carried out a survey on the general satisfaction level among visitors to the seven museums it runs (the Hong Kong Space Museum, Hong Kong Museum of Art, Hong Kong Museum of Coastal Defence, Hong Kong Museum of History, Hong Kong Science Museum and Museum of Tea Ware) and also their satisfaction level with the museum facilities. The Hong Kong Space Museum scored the lowest among the seven museums, at only 76.1% for general satisfaction and 78% for satisfaction with the facilities.

In August 2014, an Oriental Daily News reporter was sent to inspect the museum. Some inaccurate information was found. For example, a satellite program in the 1990s was described as a future space program. In another example, Pluto, which had been removed from the list of planets in the Solar System, had yet to be removed from the Solar System model. Also, information on China's space program history was found to be severely lacking, with only a few display boards. On TripAdvisor, an International travel website, some netizens had also criticized the exhibits at the museum for being outdated and unappealing. In response to the criticisms, the Leisure and Cultural Services Department admitted that the inaccurate information on the display boards might have misled the public, promising to provide more up-to-date information on the display boards and remove any information that was misleading. The department also promised that some of the permanent exhibits would be replaced with newer ones. In 2018, an Oriental Daily News reporter was again sent to inspect the museum's exhibition halls, 4 months after they reopened following a renovation project. It was found that most of the exhibits had been badly damaged, suggesting that they had not been properly preserved. Yet, before the poor state of maintenance was discovered, 400,000 HKD had already been spent repairing the exhibits. Given that the state of the exhibits remained poor, it was said to be a huge waste of money and to have tarnished Hong Kong's image. Another reporter from HK01 was also sent to inspect the museum the same year. It was found that of the 110 new interactive exhibits, 64% had been repaired at least once.

== Transportation ==
The museum is within walking distance from Exit J of East Tsim Sha Tsui station and Exit E of Tsim Sha Tsui station of the Mass Transit Railway (MTR). It is also near the Star Ferry Pier and a bus terminus.
