= Star House =

Coordinates: 22°17′41″N 114°10′08″E

- Chinese: 星光行
Transcriptions
Standard Mandarin
- Hanyu Pinyin: Xīngguāng ??
Yue: Cantonese
- Jyutping: seng1 gwong1 haang4

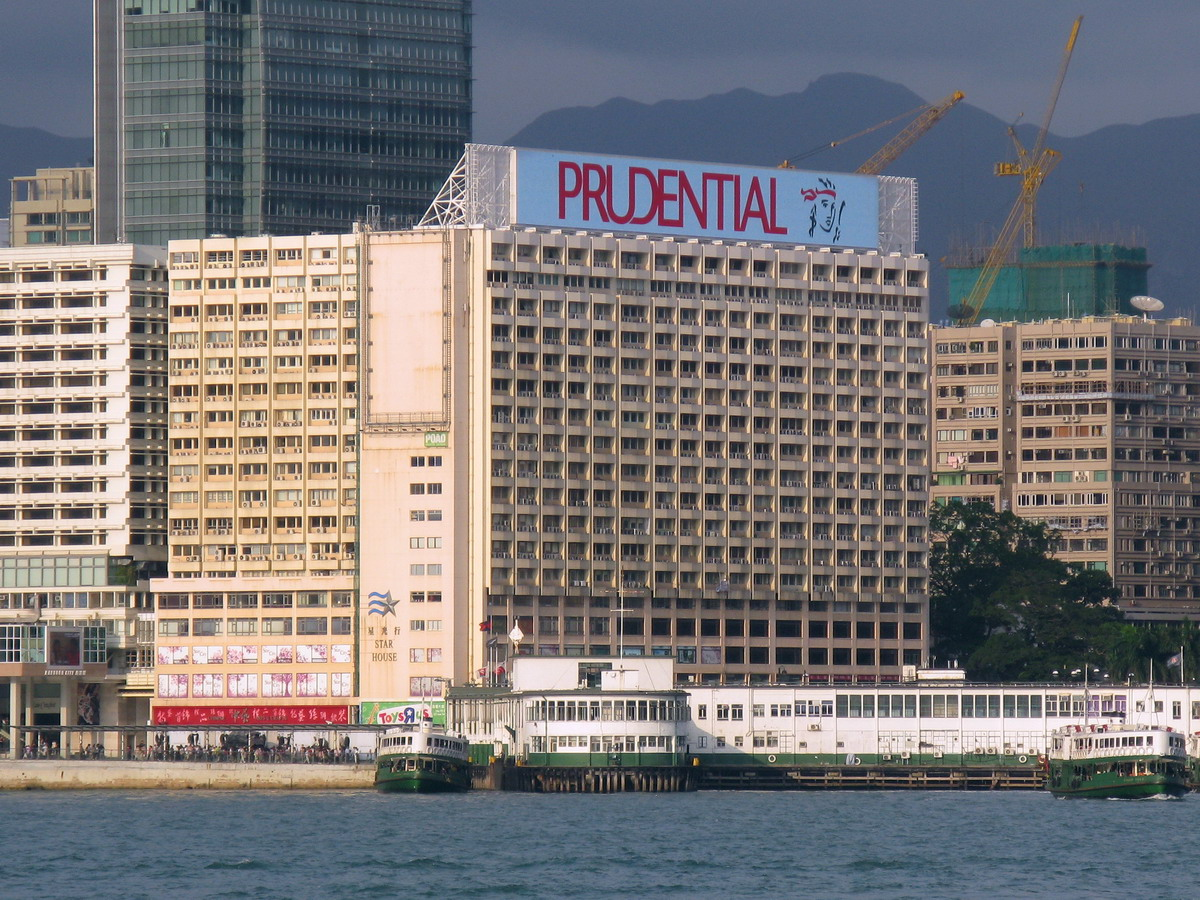
Star House with Tsim Sha Tsui Ferry Pier in the foreground.

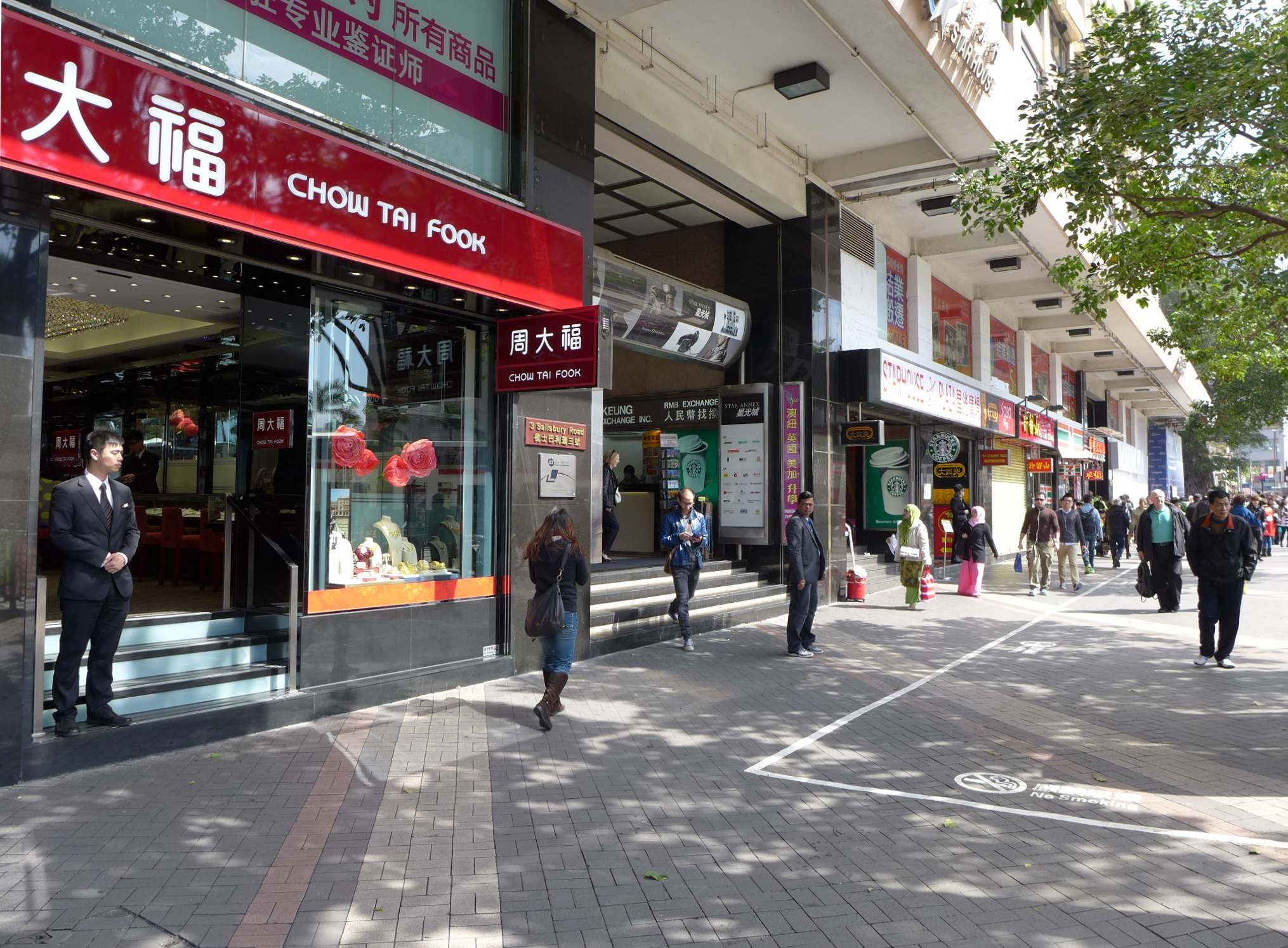
Shops of Star House

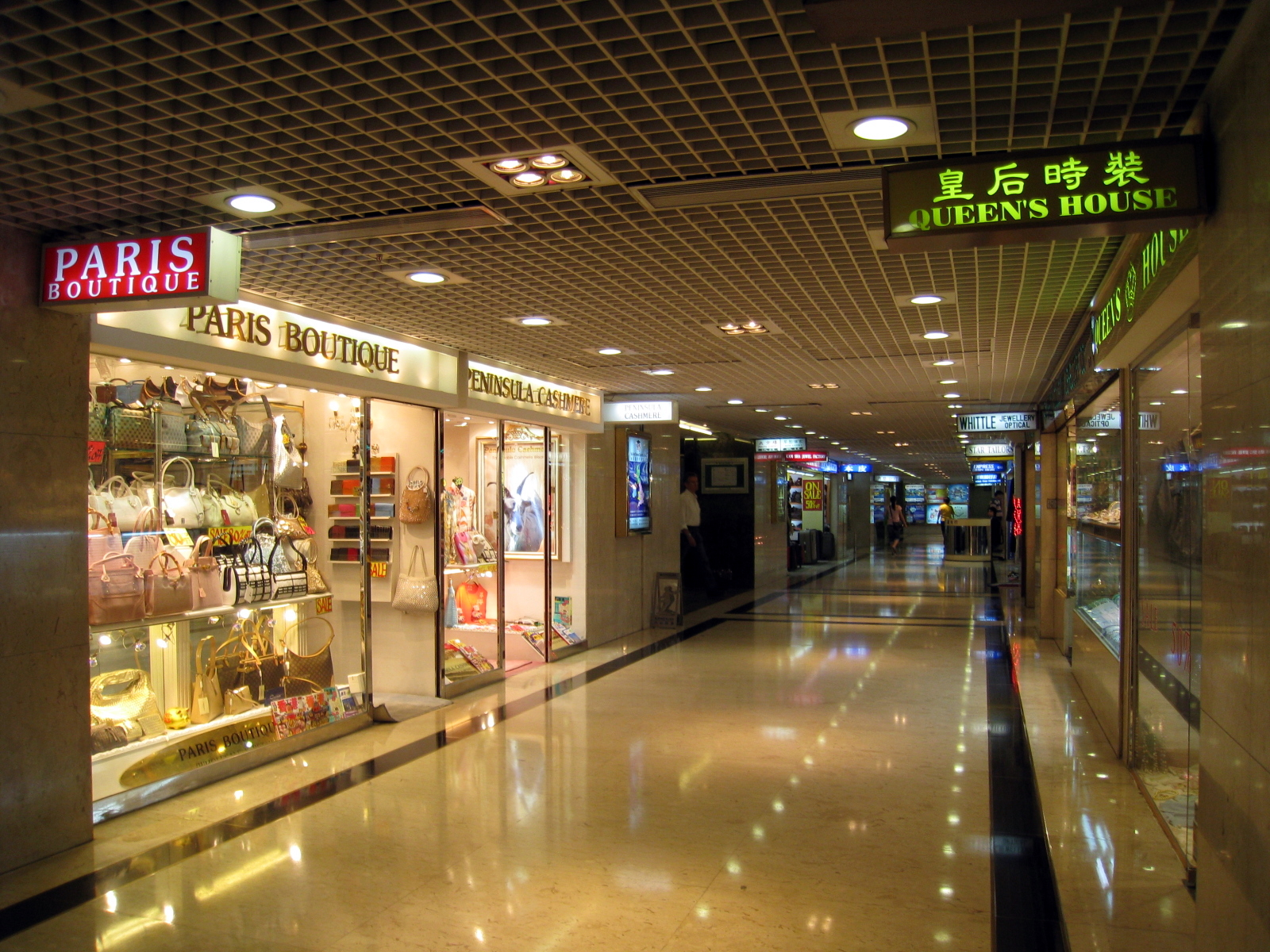
Shopping Arcade

Star House (Chinese: 星光行; Jyutping: seng1 gwong1 haang4) is a commercial building facing Victoria Harbour in Tsim Sha Tsui, Kowloon, Hong Kong. The building is located on Salisbury Road and Canton Road.

Star House has 50,800 square feet (4,720 m^{2}) of commercial space.

At first, the building called Kowloon Commercial Building (九龍商業大廈), then renamed to Star House in July 1968. The current building's name is linked to the nearby Tsim Sha Tsui Ferry Pier used by the Star Ferry. The ferry terminal is owned by The Wharf (Holdings).

== History ==
The first Star House (Godown) was a two-storey warehouse structure built in 1923 for The Hong Kong and Kowloon Wharf and Godown Company, Limited and demolished around 1963 to make way for the current 19-floor retail and commercial concourse, which was completed by 20 September 1967.

From 1975 to 1983, the Hong Kong Museum of History was housed in a 700 m^{2} rented space within Star House.

== Tenants ==
- McDonald's – basement
- Eslite Bookstore – 2-3rd floor (Star Annex of Harbour City)
- Chiuchow Garden Restaurant - 2nd floor
- Peking Garden Restaurant – 3rd floor
- Jade Garden Restaurant - 4th floor
- Consulate General of Cambodia in Hong Kong – 6th floor. It is one of two foreign missions located outside of Hong Kong Island.

== Transport ==
The building is accessible within walking distance South West from Tsim Sha Tsui station of the MTR.

== See also ==
- Ocean Terminal, Hong Kong
- Harbour City (Hong Kong)
