= Star Ferry Pier, Tsim Sha Tsui =

Ferry pier in Hong Kong

Coordinates: 22.29400°N 114.16857°E

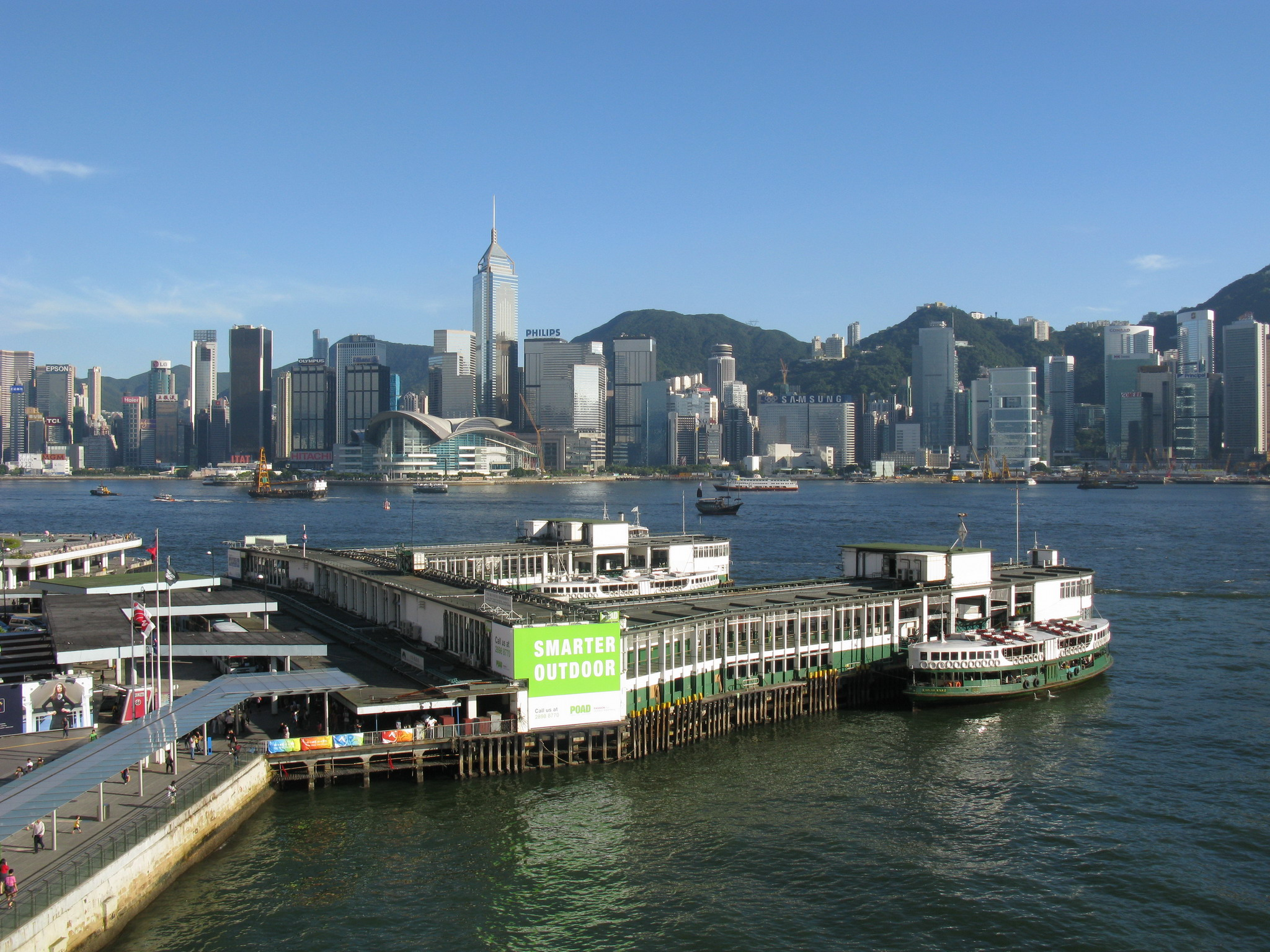
- Tsim Sha Tsui Star Ferry Pier in August 2008
- Traditional Chinese: 尖沙咀碼頭
- Simplified Chinese: 尖沙咀码头
Transcriptions
Standard Mandarin
- Hanyu Pinyin: Jiānshāzǔi mǎtōu
- Bopomofo: ㄐ一ㄢㄕㄚㄗㄨˇi ㄇㄚˇㄊㄡ
- Gwoyeu Romatzyh: Jianshatzuui maatou
- Wade–Giles: Chien^{1}-sha^{1}-tsui^{3} ma^{3}-t'ou^{1}
Yue: Cantonese
- Yale Romanization: jim^{1} saa^{1} jeui^{2} maa^{5} tau^{4}
- Jyutping: Zim^{1} saa^{1} zeoi^{2} maa^{5} tau^{4}

Star Ferry Pier, Tsim Sha Tsui, or Tsim Sha Tsui Ferry Pier, is a pier located on reclaimed land at the southernmost tip of Tsim Sha Tsui on Kowloon Peninsula in Hong Kong. It is commonly known as Star Ferry Pier (天星碼頭) in Tsim Sha Tsui. Star Ferry operates the pedestrian ferry service across Victoria Harbour to Wan Chai and to Central on Hong Kong Island. The location is identified as "Kowloon Point" in the franchise held by Star Ferry.

== History ==
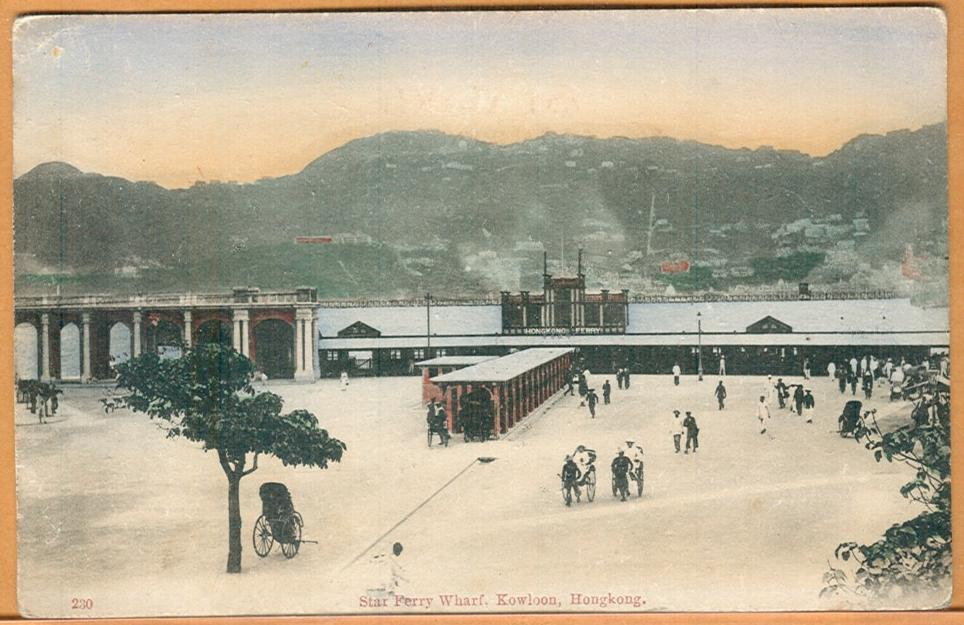
Tsim Sha Tsui Ferry Pier in 1920.

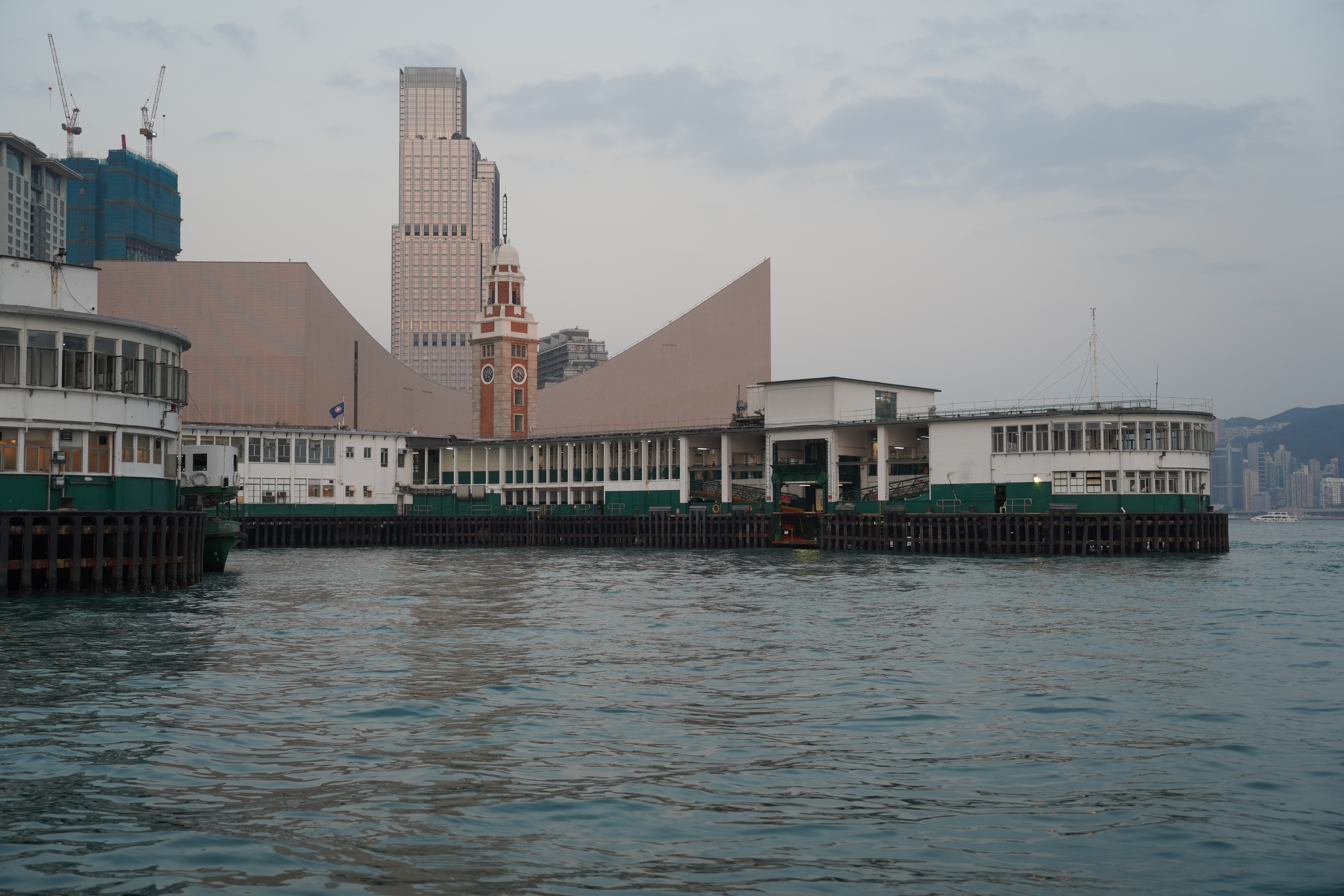
Tsim Sha Tsui Ferry Pier in 2023.

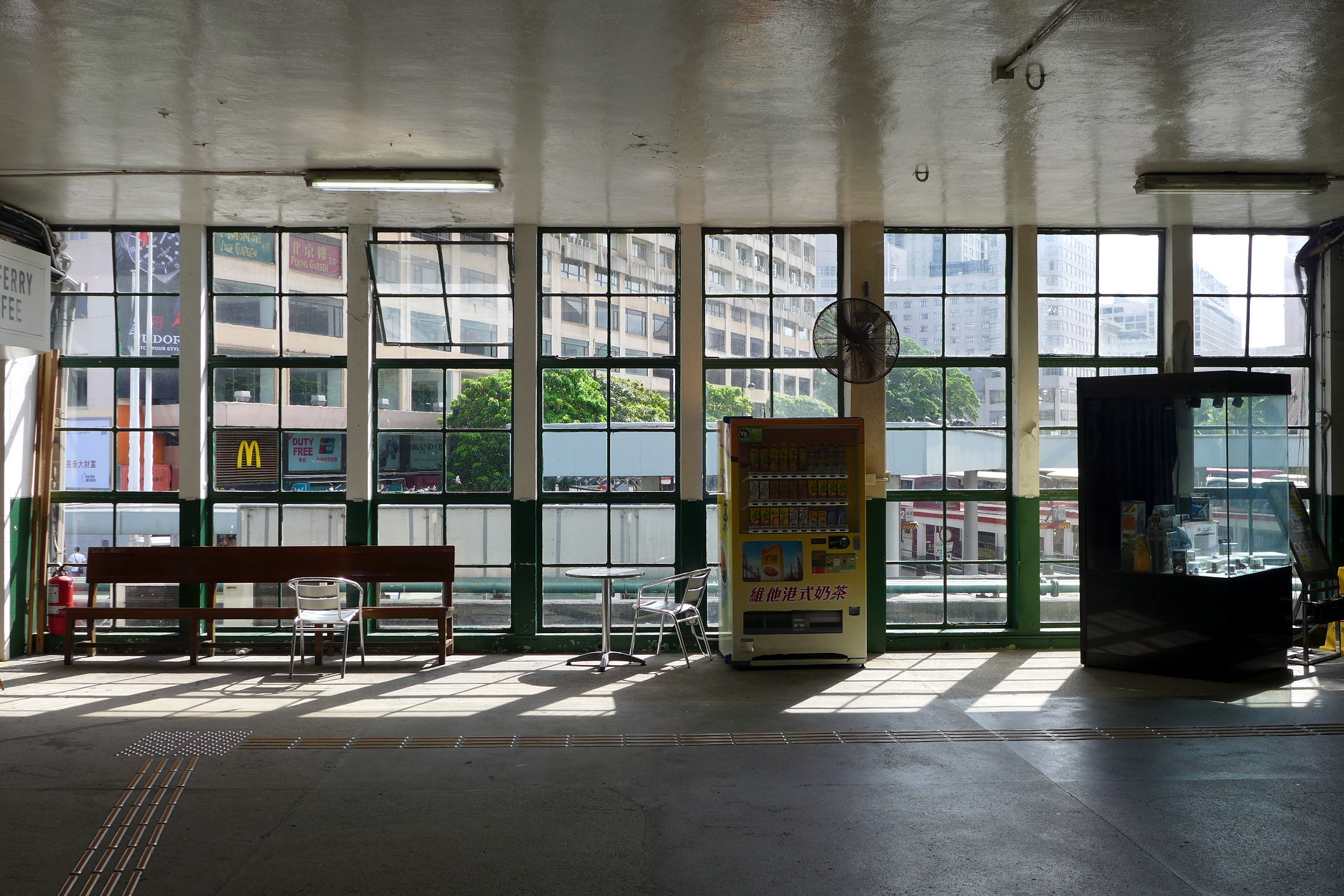
Windows of Tsim Sha Tsui Star Ferry Pier in June 2015

Construction of the first pier on the present location started in 1904, after the great land reclamation which extended Salisbury Road. It was of a "finger design". The pier opened in 1906, but was destroyed by typhoon in September 1906.

Its replacement, which was designed to accommodate two ferries, was completed in 1914. In the early 1950s, construction of the present twin-piered terminal commenced on both sides of Victoria Harbour. The structure was completed in 1957, concurrent with the completion of the now demolished Edinburgh Place Ferry Pier, which was built on the island side. Both piers were examples of Streamline Moderne.

== Structure ==
Like the Ferry Pier on Hong Kong Island, the pier consists of a two bi-level piers. The upper level boarding is more expensive than the lower level boarding area. The two structures are supported by wood pilings. Unlike the Hong Kong side, the Tsim Sha Tsui pier itself does not have a clock tower, though one is located nearby.

A bus terminus located at the foot of Salisbury Road hosts Kowloon Motor Bus bus routes travelling to various parts of Kowloon and New Kowloon.

The pier is close to Star House, Ocean Terminal, Hong Kong Cultural Centre, and the Clock Tower of former KCR Kowloon station. The Five Flag Poles between the pier and Star House are a popular meeting place. The Kowloon Public Pier is located south-east.

There are a few retail shops at the Pier, including newsstands, a shop selling Star Ferry merchandise (models of ferries), an HSBC branch, and a Hong Kong Tourism Board information centre.

== Destinations ==
Destination; English	Ferry Pier Name; English
Central	Central Ferry Piers
Wan Chai	Wan Chai Ferry Pier
Disneyland Resort	Disneyland Resort Pier

== See also ==
- Queen's Pier
- Edinburgh Place Ferry Pier
- Star Ferry Pier, Central
