= Clock Tower, Hong Kong =

Monument in Tsim Sha Tsui, Hong Kong

Former Kowloon-Canton Railway Clock Tower
- 前九廣鐵路鐘樓
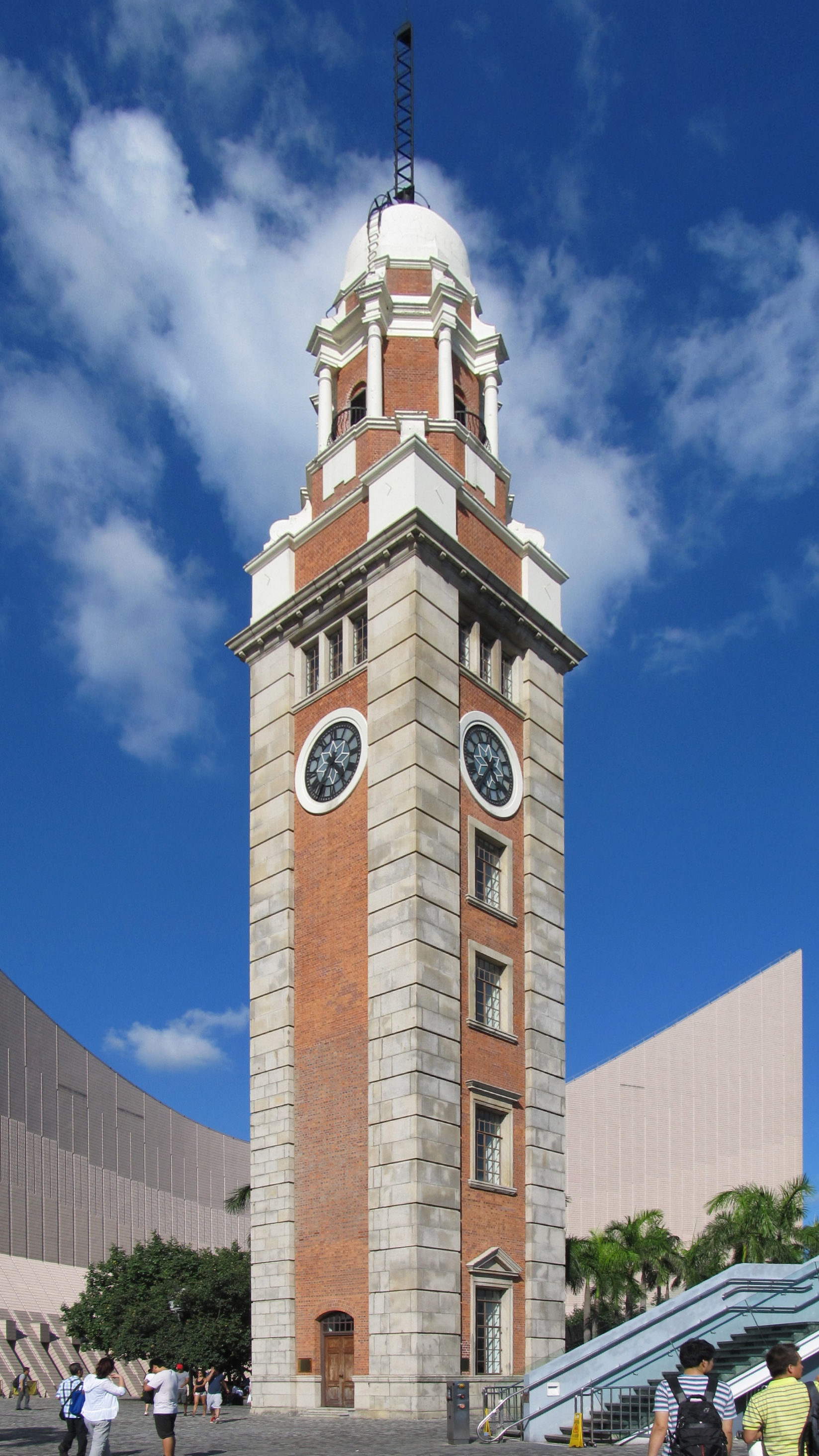
- Clock Tower (2013)
- Interactive map of the Former Kowloon-Canton Railway Clock Tower area

General information
- Type: Clock tower
- Architectural style: Edwardian
- Location: Tsim Sha Tsui, Hong Kong
- Coordinates: 22°17′37.24″N 114°10′09.71″E
- Construction started: 1913; 113 years ago
- Completed: 1915; 111 years ago

Height
- Height: 44 m (144.4 ft) (roof)

Dimensions
- Other dimensions: 51 m (167.3 ft) (lightning rod)

Declared Monument of Hong Kong
- Designated: 13 July 1990; 35 years ago
- Reference no.: 43

Clock Tower
- Traditional Chinese: 尖沙咀鐘樓
Transcriptions
Yue: Cantonese
- Jyutping: zim^{1} saa^{1} zeoi^{2} zung^{1} lau^{4}

Alternative Chinese name
- Traditional Chinese: 前九廣鐵路鐘樓
Transcriptions
Yue: Cantonese
- Jyutping: cin^{4} gau^{2} gwong^{2} tit^{2} lou^{6} zung^{1} lau^{4}

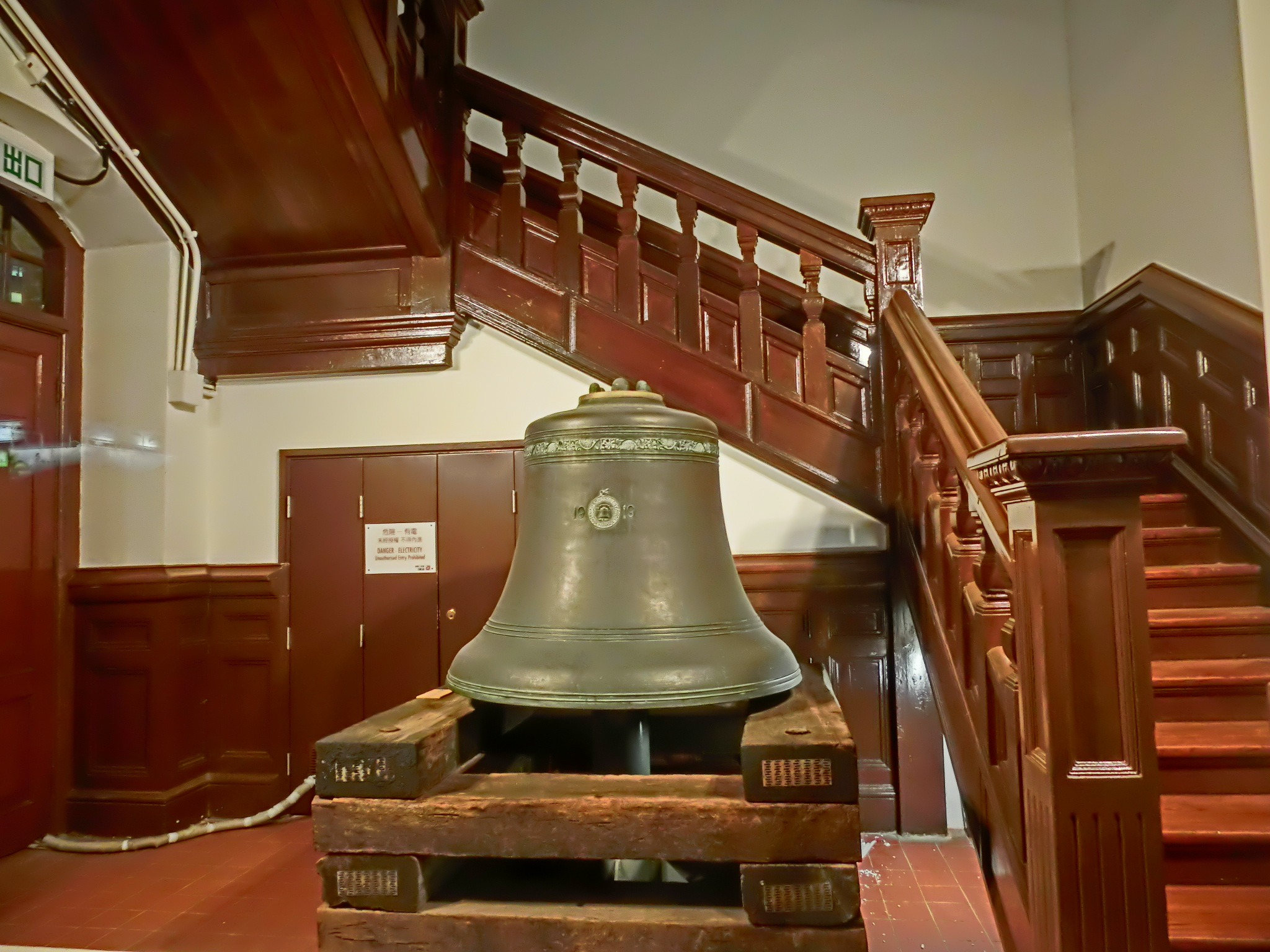
The bell on display inside the Clock Tower.

The Clock Tower is a landmark in Hong Kong. It is located on the southern shore of Tsim Sha Tsui, Kowloon. It is the only remnant of the original site of the former Kowloon station on the Kowloon–Canton Railway. Officially named Former Kowloon-Canton Railway Clock Tower (Chinese: 前九廣鐵路鐘樓), it is usually referred to as the Tsim Sha Tsui Clock Tower (尖沙咀鐘樓) for its location.

Built out of red bricks and granite, the Clock Tower peaks at 44 metres, and is topped by a 7-metre lightning rod. The top of the tower can be reached by a wooden staircase located within. The interior of Clock Tower had previously been open for the visit but is currently closed for maintenance. The clock tower is located near Victoria Harbour and near the western end of Salisbury Road. Another landmark, the Tsim Sha Tsui Ferry Pier, is located nearby.

The tower has been listed as a declared monument in Hong Kong since 1990.

== History ==
The plan of Kowloon-Canton Railway was realised in 1904 with its terminus in Tsim Sha Tsui. The terminus design was assigned to A. B. Hubback due, in part, to his experiences in designing Railway Terminus in the Straits Settlements, Malaya. The Kowloon-Canton Railway was inaugurated on 1 October 1910; however, construction of the station did not begin until 1913. A temporary station was used while the best site for the location of the station was determined, and work on sea walls and site formation on reclaimed land was completed. The onset of the First World War also resulted in delivery of materials required for the building being delayed, and construction was halted for some time. Part of the station, including the Clock Tower, was completed in 1915, and the whole station was opened on 28 March 1916.

The bell was cast in 1919 by John Taylor & Co, a bell foundry located in Loughborough, Leicestershire, England. It arrived in Hong Kong in 1920. The Clock Tower reused the clock from the demolished Pedder Street Clock Tower. However, only one side had a clock, and it was not until 1920 that the remaining three sides of the Clock Tower were installed. They began operation on the afternoon of 22 March 1921, and have run ever since except during the Japanese occupation of Hong Kong during World War II. During the fighting before the occupation, the clock tower building sustained damage, leaving the marks of combat present to this day.

During the Japanese occupation, the clock tower was coloured a camouflage grey and bell chiming was halted. Following the liberation of Hong Kong, the clock was reactivated on 2 October 1945, and the paint was removed, revealing the original red brick and grey stone façade. The use of the clock tower's bell was discontinued in 1950 after four separate motors were installed, once for each face of the clock – meaning the times shown on each side of the tower were slightly different.

In the early 1970s, the Clock Tower housed a government dental surgery clinic.

In 1975, Kowloon station was moved to the present-day Hung Hom station on the newly reclaimed Hung Hom Bay. The station building was demolished in 1977 despite the protest and petitioning from the Heritage Society and other pressure groups. However, as a compromise, it was decided that the Clock Tower was to be preserved, and it is now accompanied by the Hong Kong Space Museum, Hong Kong Museum of Art and Hong Kong Cultural Centre, all built on former station grounds.

On 13 July 1990, the tower was gazetted as a declared monument under the Antiquities and Monuments Ordinance.

The bell inside the Clock Tower was on display in Sha Tin station from the mid-1980s to 1995 and was moved to the KCRC Office in Fo Tan from 1995 to the early 2000s. Finally, the government moved the bell inside the Clock Tower in 2010.

On 9 December 2021, the use of the Clock Tower's bell chimes was resumed. From this point, the bell will ring hourly between 8am to midnight. It reports the time via a digital bell system synchronised with the web clock of the Hong Kong Observatory.

== Gallery ==
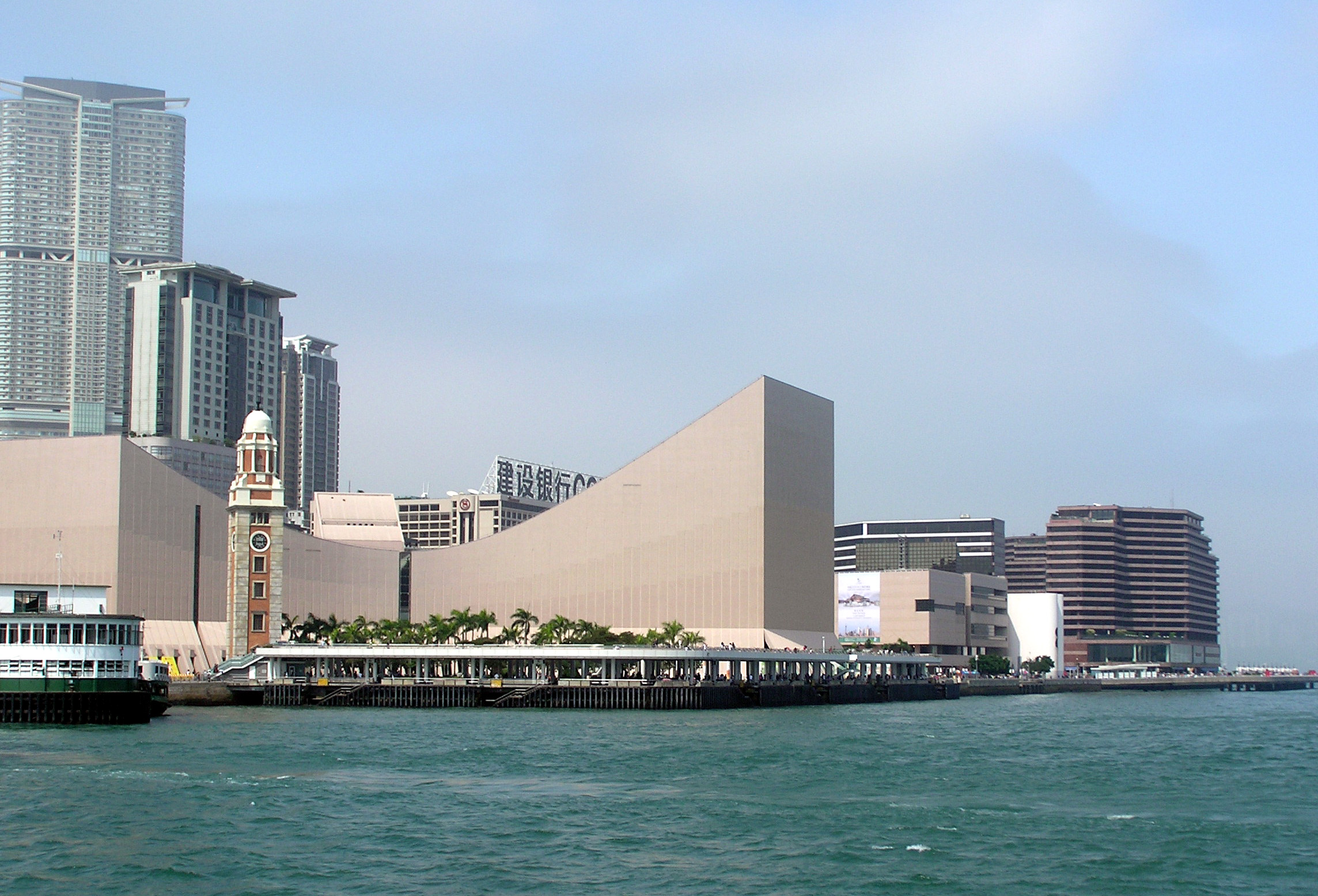
The Clock Tower and its surrounding area, c. 2010.

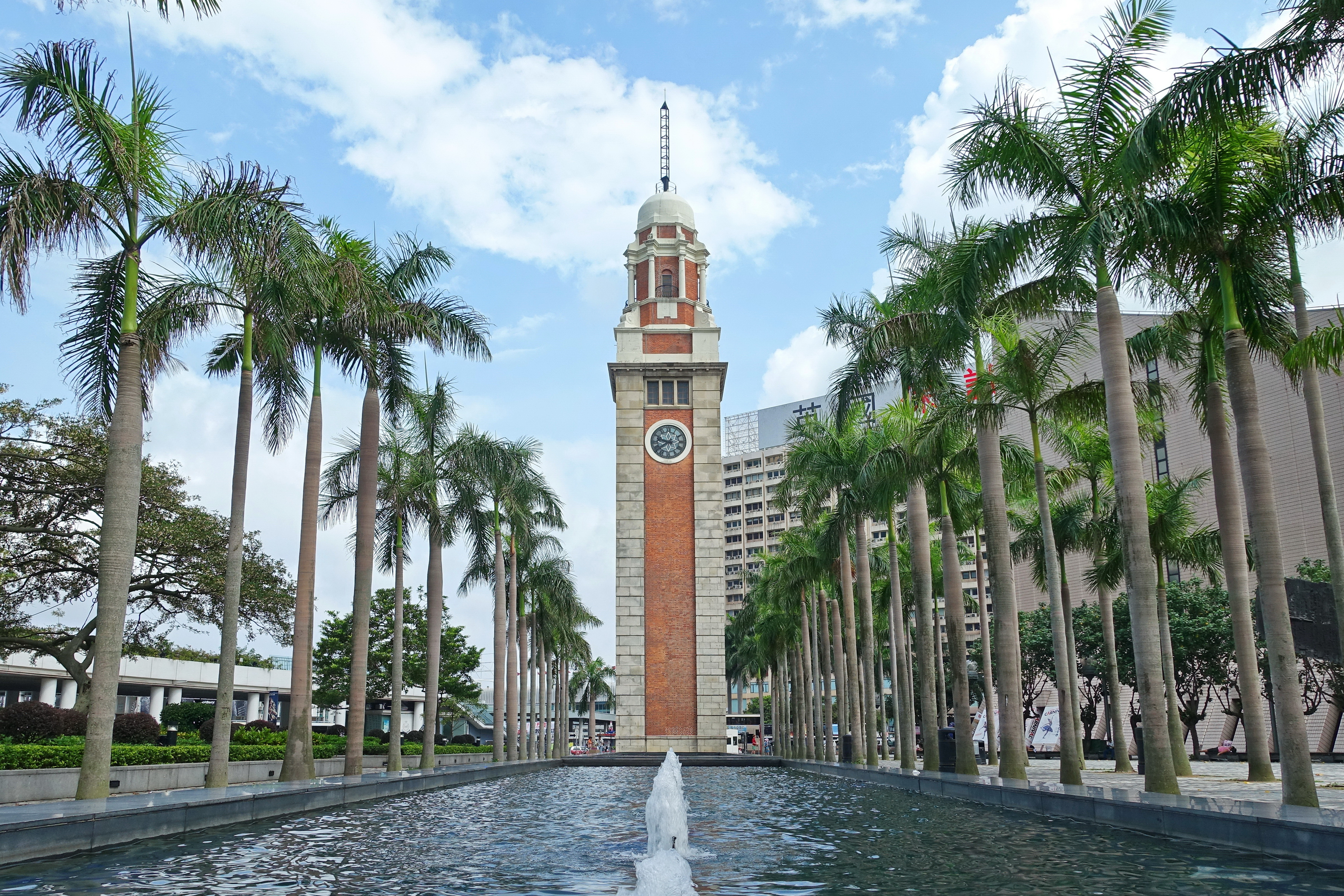
The Clock Tower and the adjacent fountain garden.

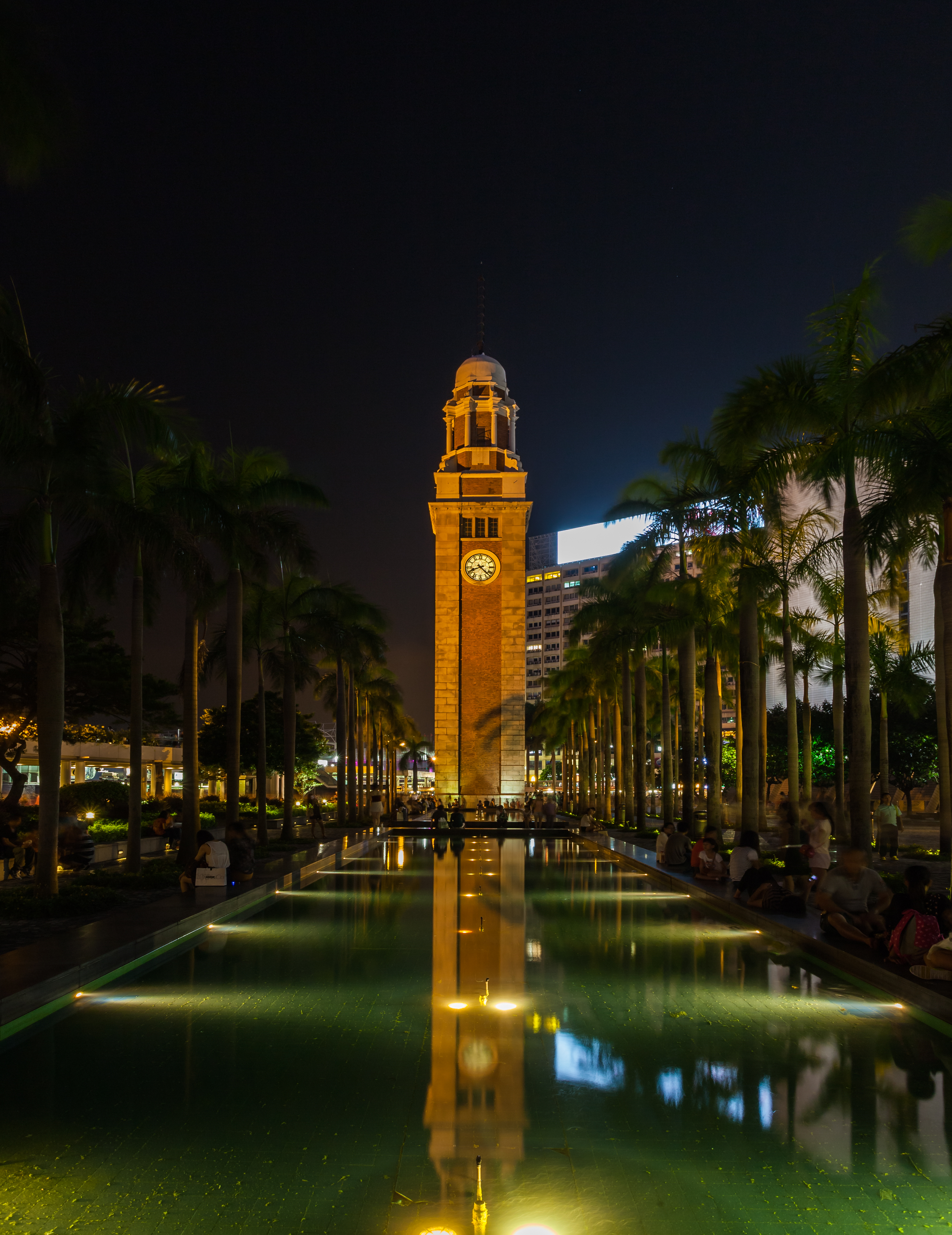
The Clock Tower in 2013.

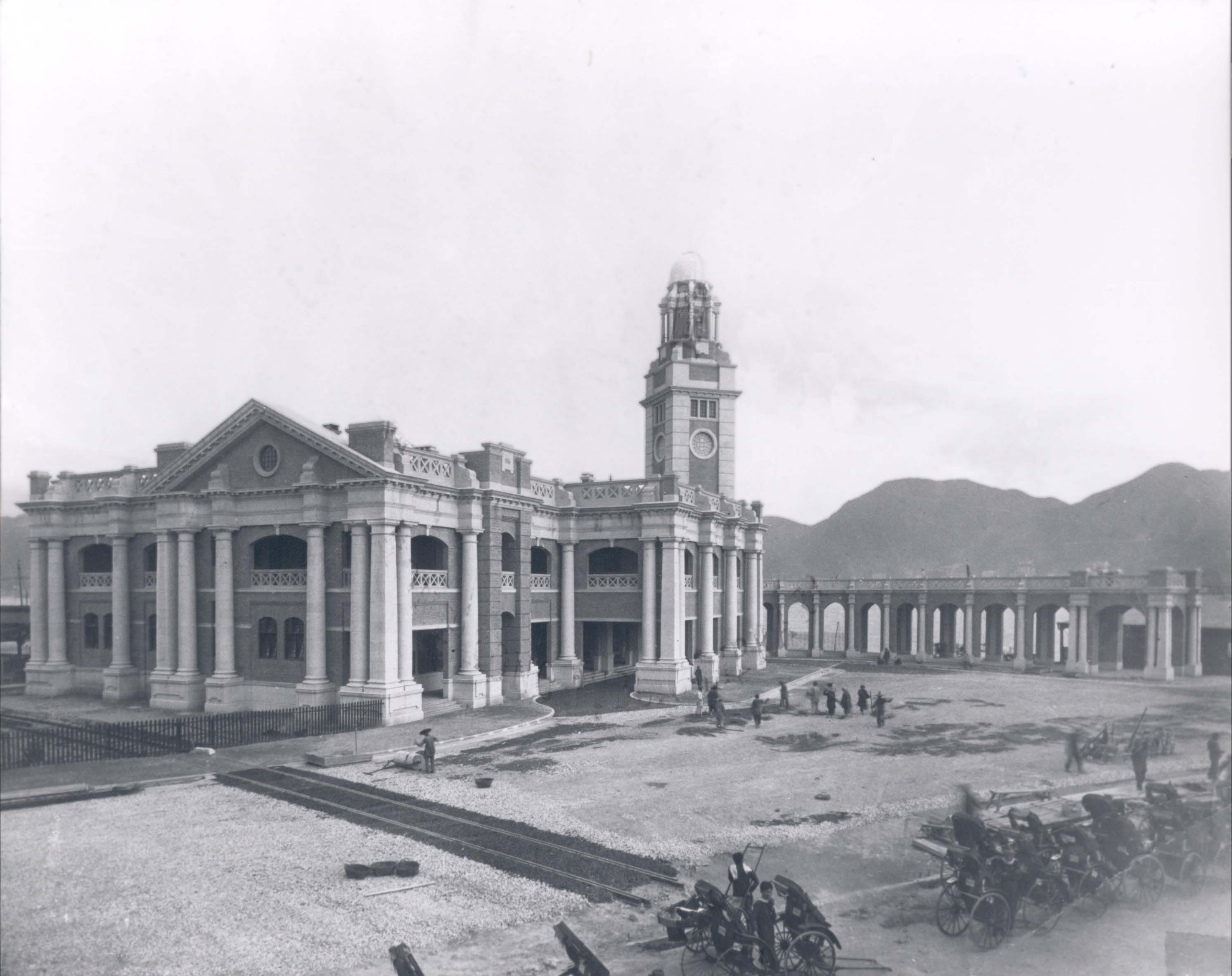
Kowloon station and the Clock Tower, 1914.

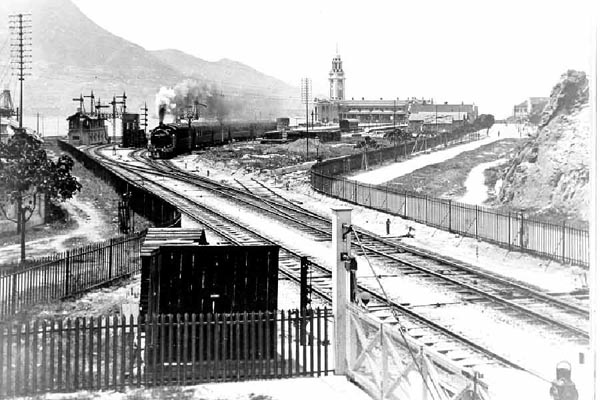
Kowloon-Canton Railway (KCR) Tsim Sha Tsui (TST) station in 1916.

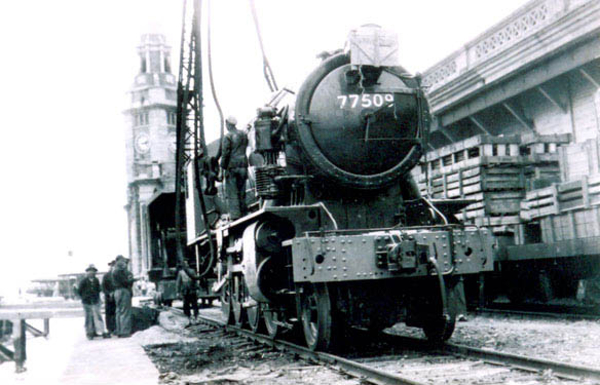
An ex-British Army WD Austerity 2-8-0 locomotive delivered to Hong Kong in 1947 for KCR British Section. The Clock Tower is visible in the background.

== See also ==
- List of buildings and structures in Hong Kong
