= Ocean Terminal, Hong Kong =

Ocean Terminal
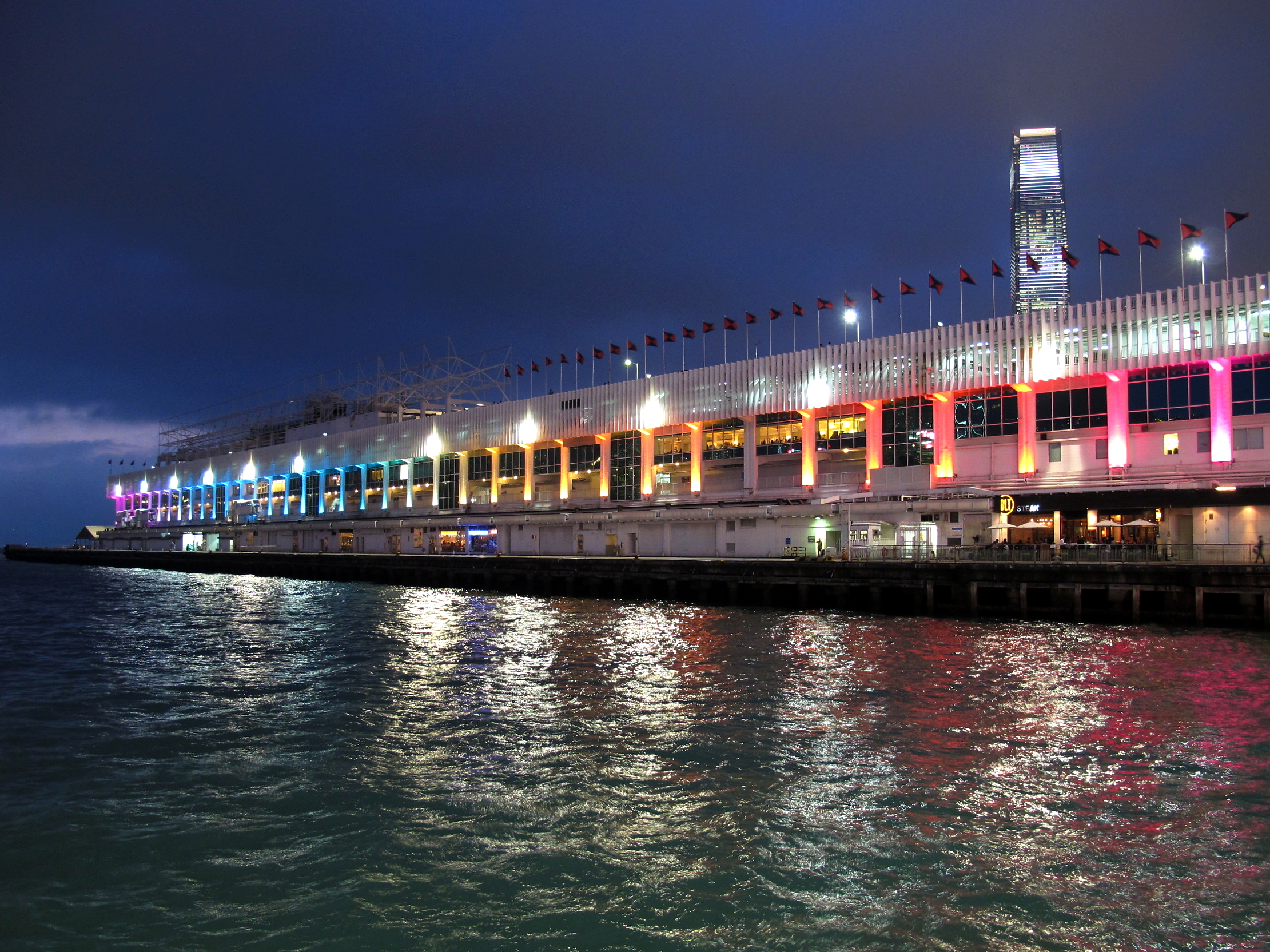
- Exterior view
- Location: Tsim Sha Tsui, Kowloon, Hong Kong
- Coordinates: 22.295058°N 114.166817°E
- Opened: 22 March 1966; 60 years ago
- Developer: The Wharf (Holdings) Limited
- Num. of stores: 114
- Num. of anchor tenants: 3
- Floor area: 2,000,000 sq ft (190,000 m^{2}) (includes Harbour City floor area)
- Floors: 4
- Website: www.oceanterminal.com.hk

Chinese name
- Traditional Chinese: 海運大廈
- Simplified Chinese: 海运大厦
- Cantonese Yale: Hói wahn daaih haah
Transcriptions
Standard Mandarin
- Hanyu Pinyin: Hǎiyùn Dàshà
Yue: Cantonese
- Yale Romanization: Hói wahn daaih haah
- Jyutping: Hoi2 wan6 daai6 haa6

Ocean Terminal is a passenger terminal servicing cruise ships and a shopping centre, located on Canton Road in Tsim Sha Tsui, Kowloon, Hong Kong.

== History ==
The location of Ocean Terminal was once a pier (Kowloon Star Ferry Pier, Kowloon Wharf and Godown) on the western shore of Tsim Sha Tsui. Rebuilt and enlarged for use as a cruise terminal, it also served as a multi-storey shopping centre. Ocean Terminal opened on 22 March 1966, signifying the increasing wealth of Hong Kong and costing HK$70 million. Its 112 shops made it "the largest shopping centre" in Hong Kong. It was the first shopping mall in Hong Kong.

In 1982, it was re-branded together with nearby buildings of the Wharf as Harbour City. Ocean Terminal is now owned by The Wharf (Holdings) Limited.

== Heavy transport ==
The annual berth utilisation rate of Ocean Terminal in Tsim Sha Tsui, which offers two berths accommodating vessels of up to 50,000 tonnes, rose to 76% last year from 71% in 2003. Between 2001 and 2006, some 11 cruise vessels had to berth mid-stream and at container terminals because Ocean Terminal could not meet market demand.

== Gallery ==
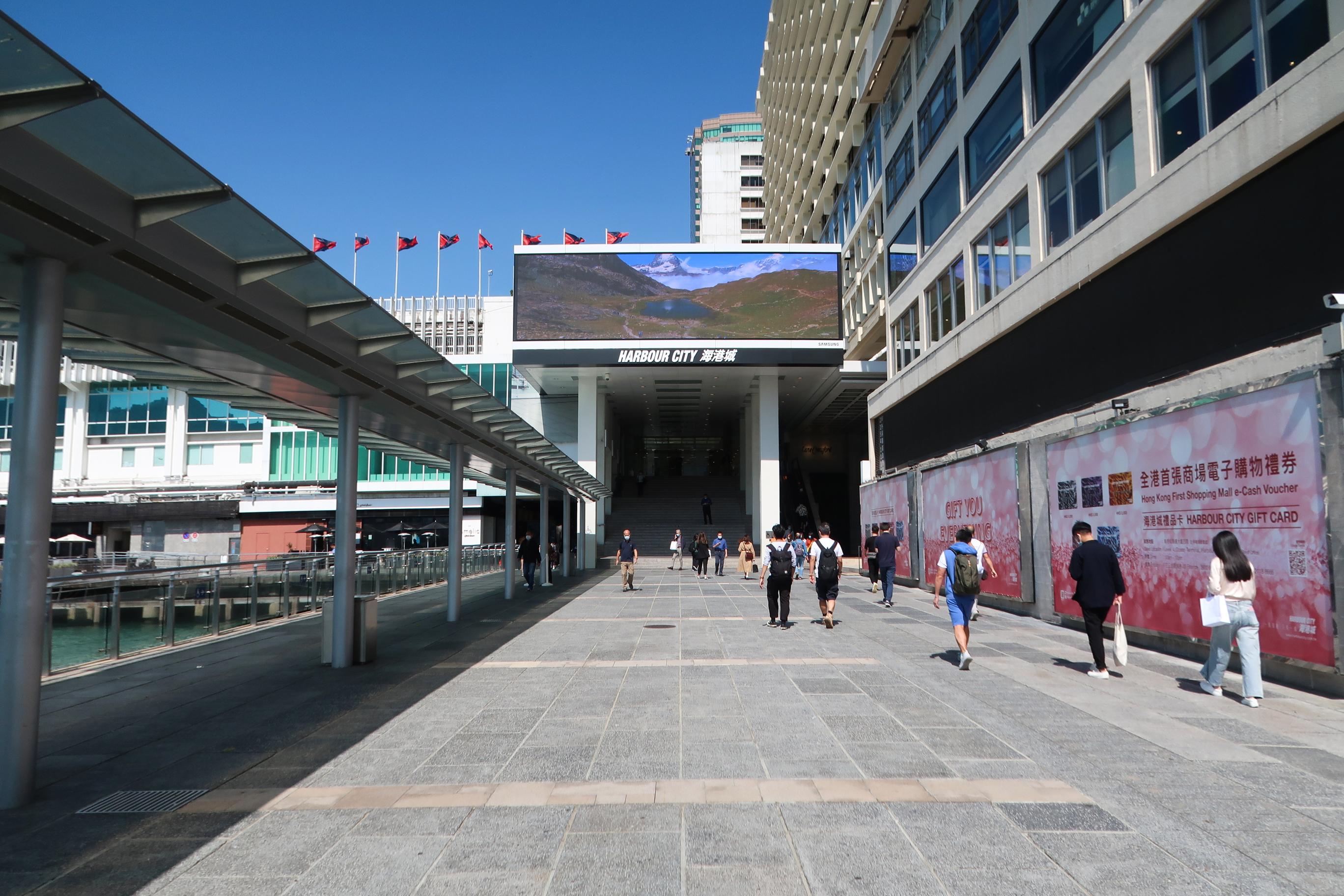
Ocean Terminal Main Entrance after renovation in 2020

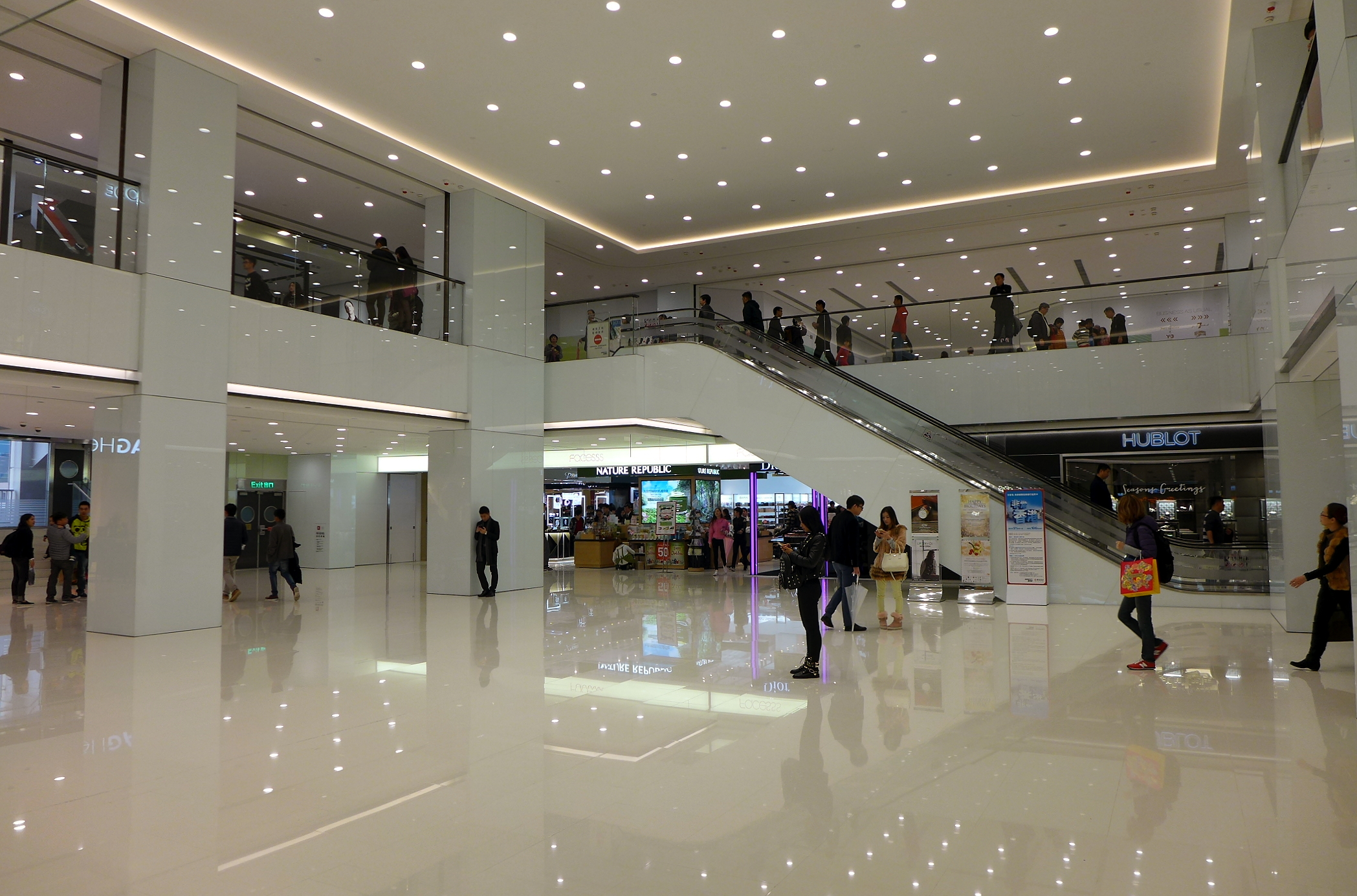
Atrium after renovation in 2014

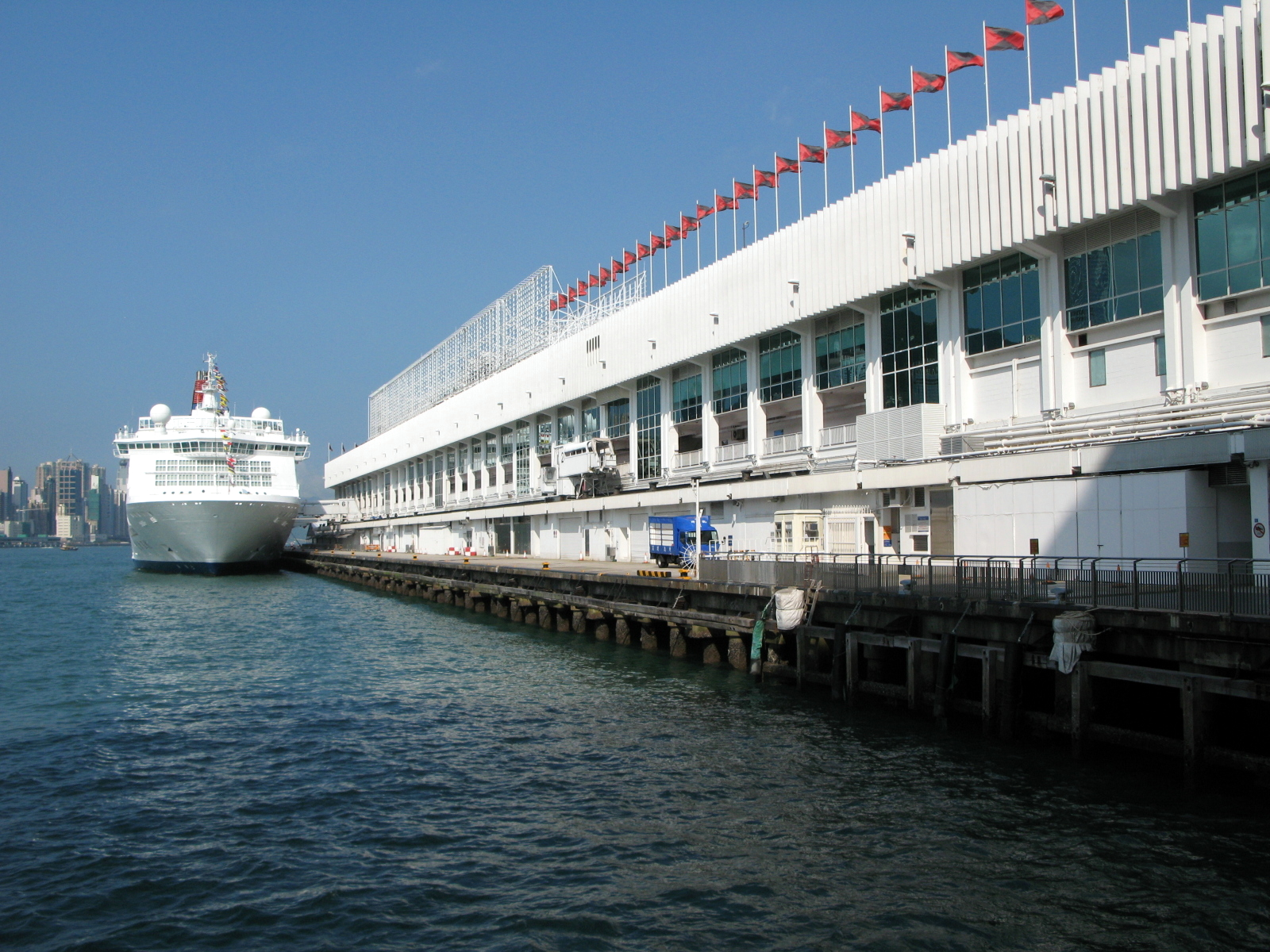
the Star Piscis approaching the harbour

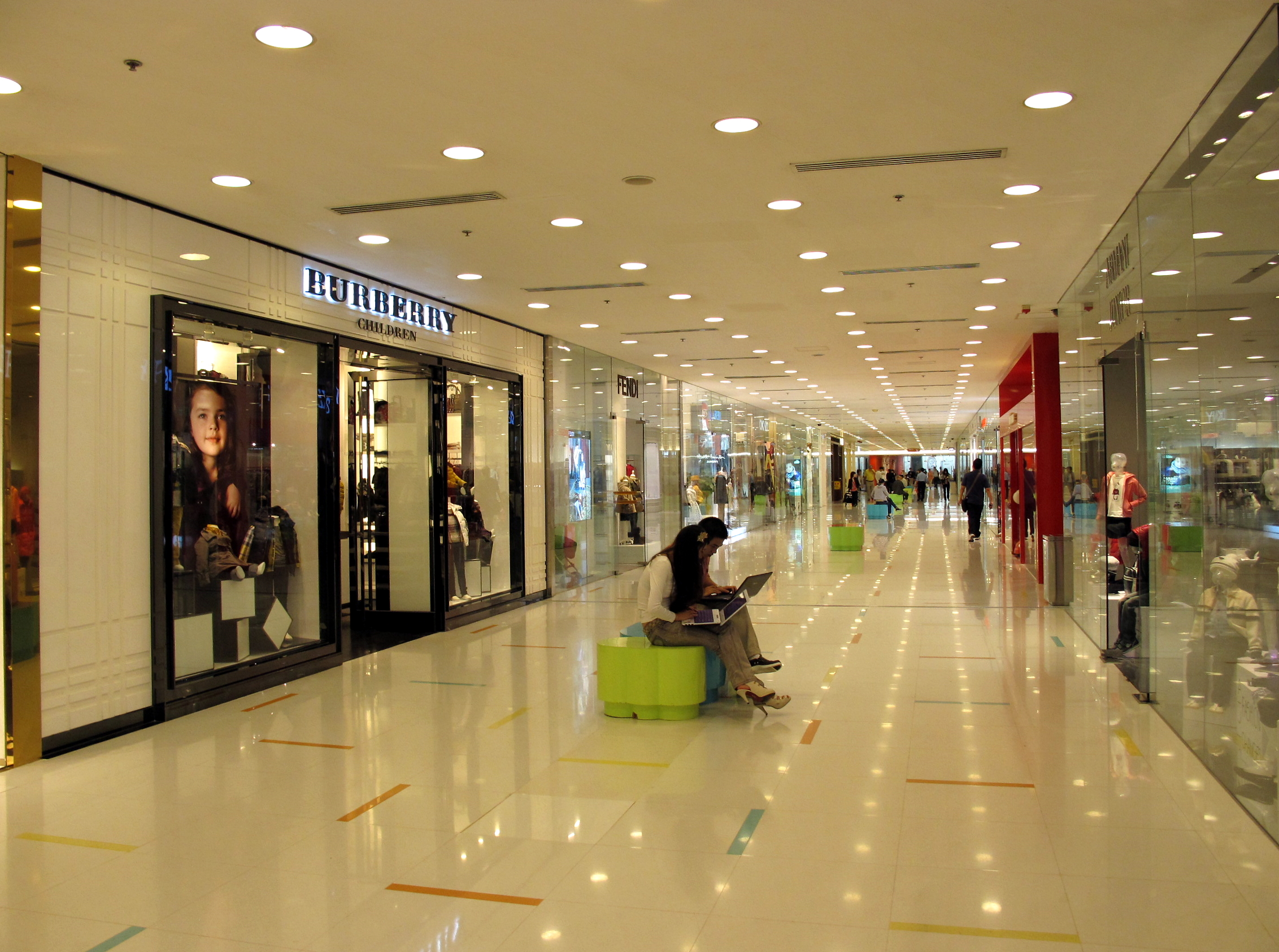
Ocean Terminal Level 1 Shops

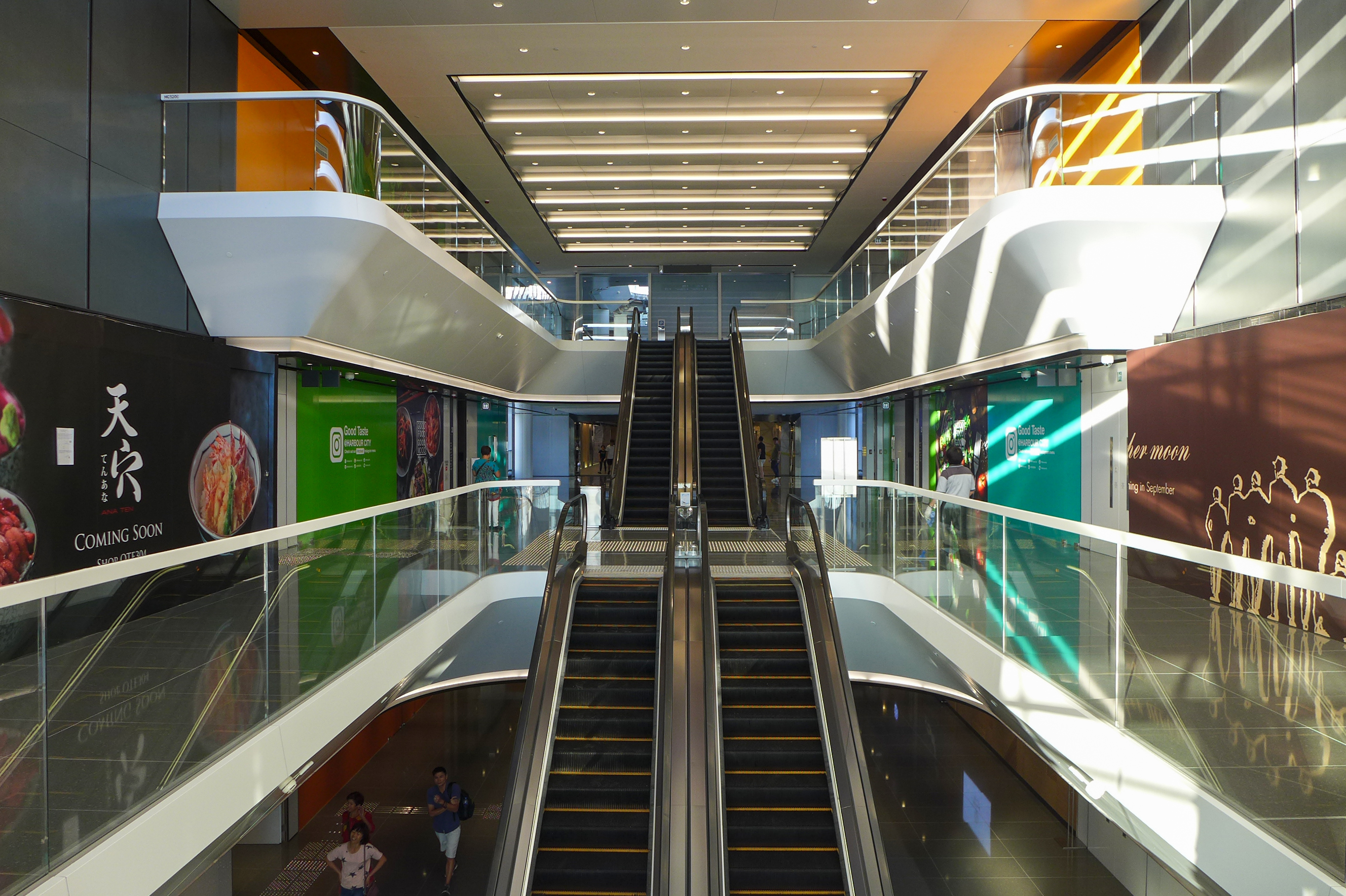
Ocean Terminal Extension completed in July, 2017

== See also ==
- Star House
