= Cheung Po Tsai Cave =

Historical landmark in Hong Kong

- 張保仔洞
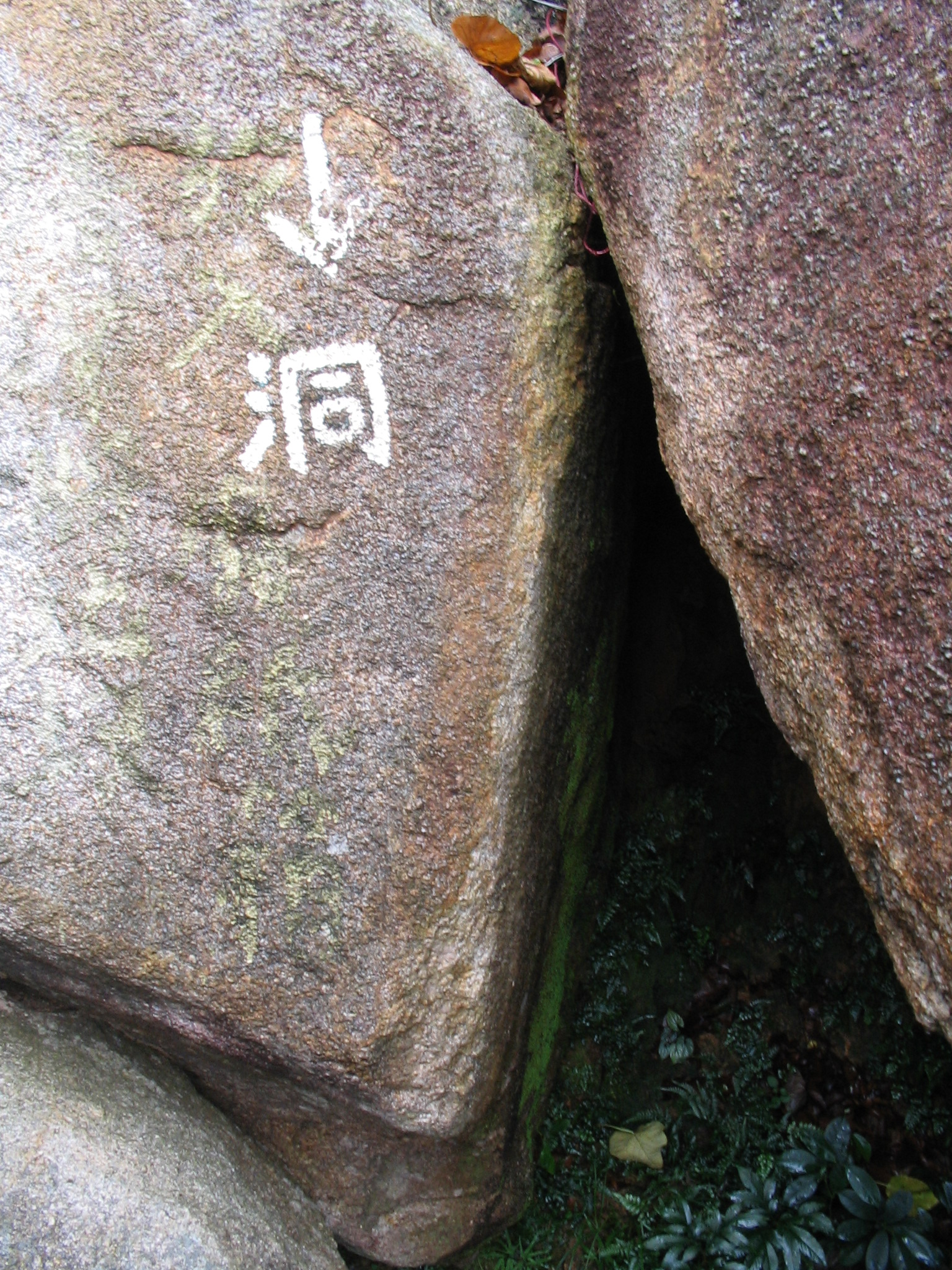
- Photo of Cheung Po Tsai Cave

- Location within Hong Kong
- Location: Cheung Chau, Hong Kong
- Coordinates: 22°12′01.1″N 114°01′03.0″E
- Depth: 10 m (33 ft)
- Length: 90 m (300 ft)
- Entrances: 1
- Hazards: slippery surface due to rain and wind
- Lighting: none

Cheung Po Tsai Cave
- Traditional Chinese: 張保仔洞
- Simplified Chinese: 张保仔洞
Transcriptions
Standard Mandarin
- Hanyu Pinyin: Zhāng bǎo zǎi dòng
Yue: Cantonese
- Yale Romanization: Jēung bóu jái duhng
- Jyutping: Zoeng^{1} bou^{2} zai^{2} dung^{6}

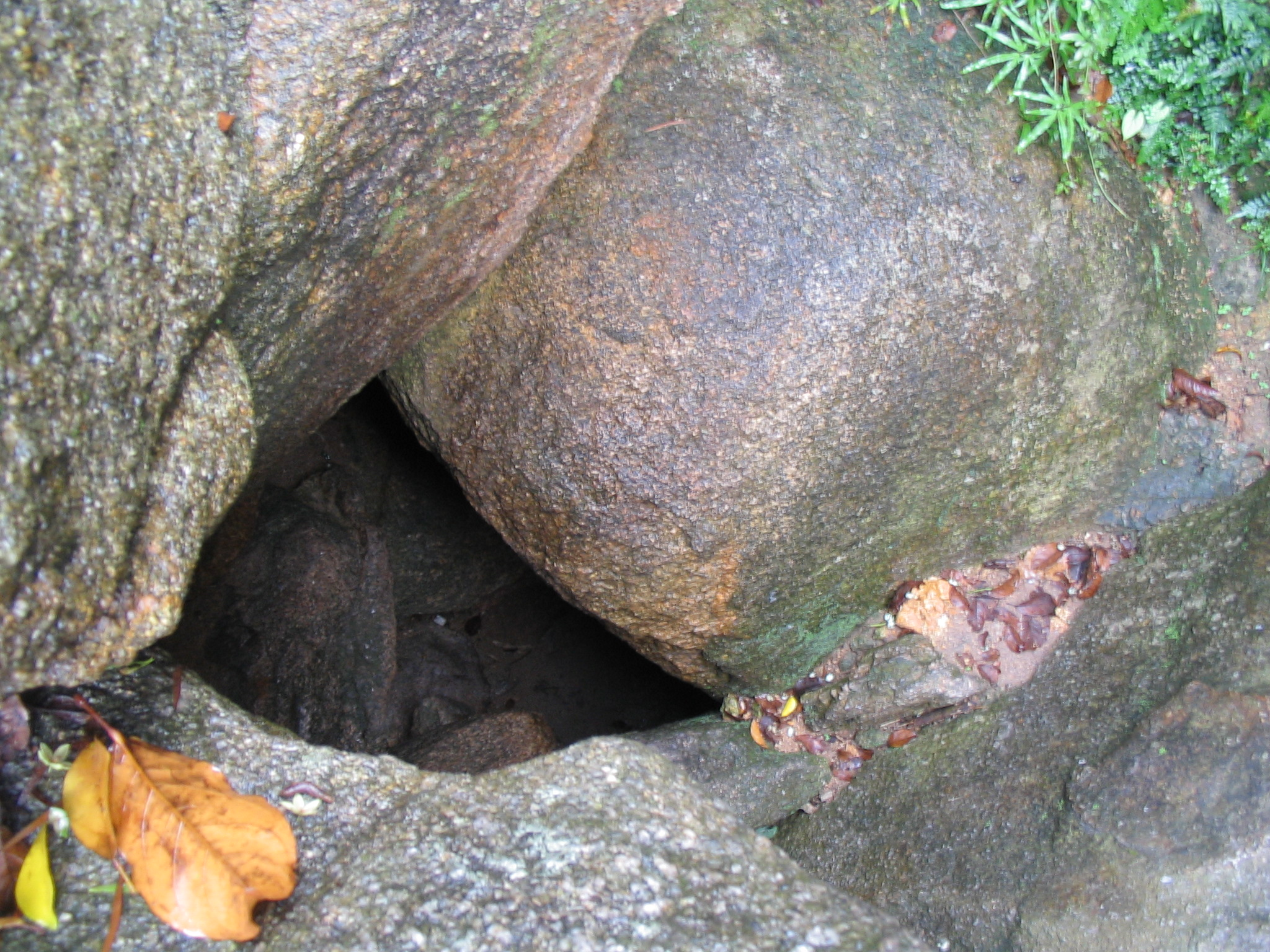
Photo of Cheung Po Tsai Cave

Cheung Po Tsai Cave (Chinese: 張保仔洞) is a natural cave in Hong Kong where the Guangdong pirate Cheung Po Tsai, according to legend, kept his treasures. It is located on the outlying island of Cheung Chau and is a popular attraction there. No treasures have been found in the cave.

== Origin ==
The cave is named after Cheung Po Tsai (張保仔), a legendary Chinese pirate during the Qing Dynasty who controlled the seas around the Pearl River Delta and served as a de facto government to most coastal communities in the area. According to legend, Cheung is said to have used the cave as refuge and for hiding his treasures during the Battle of the Tiger's Mouth.

== Description ==
To enter the cave, visitors have to climb down a ladder one by one, going 10 m (33 ft) deep underground onto a path that extends about 90 m (300 ft) before reaching an exit. The trail is narrow and the walls are slippery, so visitors must move in a single file line. A strong flashlight is recommended as little sunlight penetrates into the cave. Bats and mosquitoes are found inside the cave due to the dark and damp environment inside. Despite these conditions, no serious accidents have been reported at the site as of 2018.

In recent years, steel ladders have been added to facilitate visitors' access in and out of the cave. In April 2012, a large number of stones fell and narrowed the cave entrance.

== Other Cheung Po Tsai Caves ==
Lamma Island Cheung Po Tsai Cave is located on Lamma Island, Hong Kong. The cave was much larger than the Cheung Chau one, at nine storeys deep. It was presumed to be destroyed in 1979 when the Lamma Power Station was built near the site. However, decades of weathering has revealed an entrance to the cave, making it partly accessible again.

There are also Cheung Po Tsai Caves in Tap Mun, Sai Wan, Chung Hom Kok, Chek Chau, Siu Kau Yi Chau, and Longxue Island in Guangzhou.

== In popular culture ==
- The Amazing Race 17 visited this cave during the season's tenth episode.

== See also ==
- List of tourist attractions in Hong Kong
