= Aqua Luna =

Cheung Po Tsai
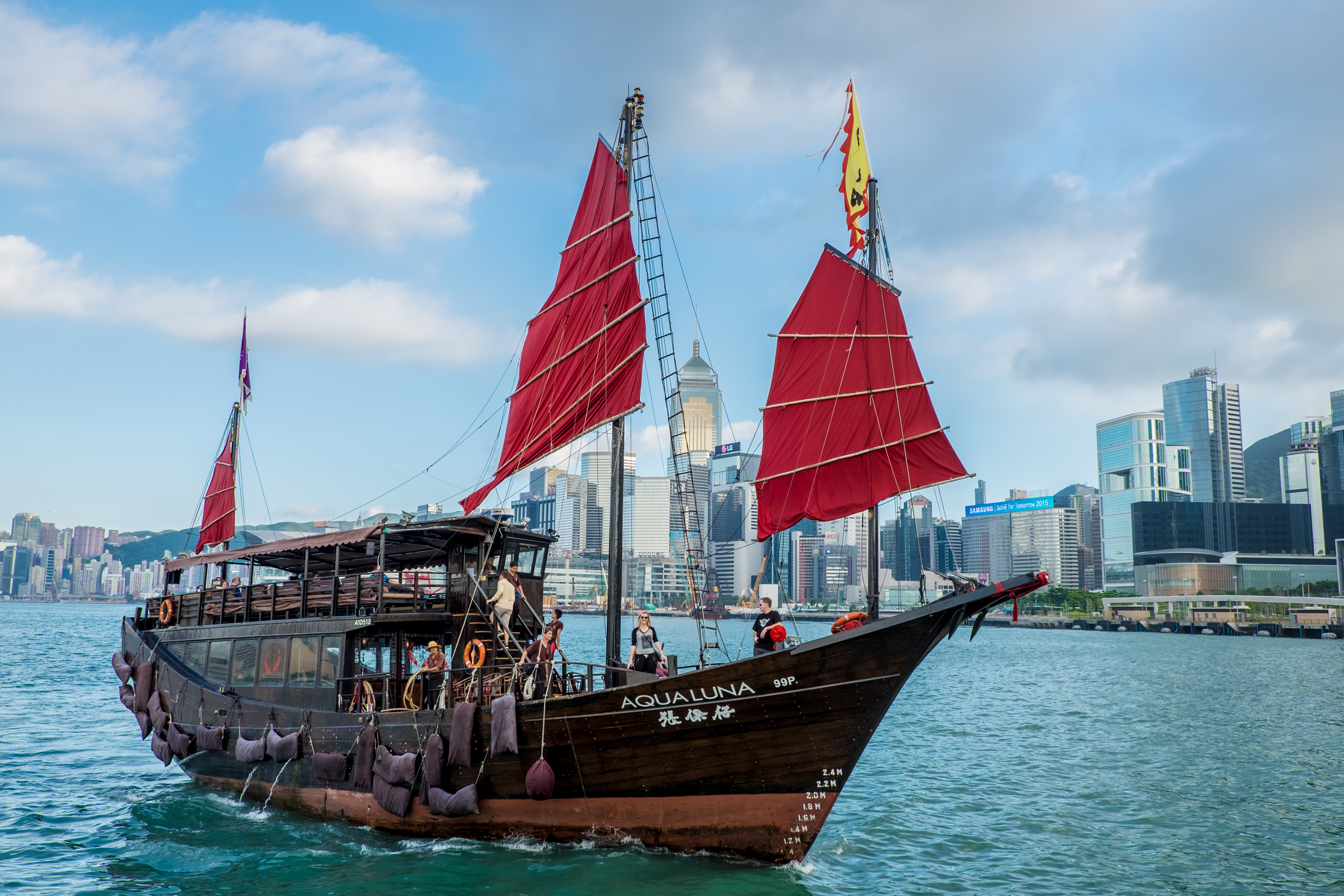
- Aqua Luna Cheung Po Tsai in 2015

History

Hong Kong
- Name: 張保仔 (Cheung Po Tsai)
- Owner: Aqua Restaurant Group
- Builder: Au Wai (father) and Au Sai Kit (son)
- Launched: January 2006

General characteristics
- Length: 28 m (92 ft)
- Decks: 2
- Propulsion: Motorised (sails are decorative)
- Sail plan: Junk rig
- Complement: 80 passengers; Unknown crew

The Aqua Luna, known in Cantonese as the Cheung Po Tsai (張保仔), is a commercial Chinese Junk operating in Victoria Harbour, Hong Kong. It was launched in 2006 and commissioned by David Yeo, founder of the Aqua Restaurant Group. The ship is named after the 19th-century Chinese pirate Cheung Po Tsai.

== Construction ==
The Aqua Luna was built by Au Sai-Kit and his father Au Wai at Kwong Ming Shipyard in A Kung Ngam Village in Shau Kei Wan. The shipyard was founded by Au Sai Kit's maternal grandfather and were responsible for creating 50-60% of Hong Kong's commercial vessels in the 1980s including shuttle boats for the Jumbo Kingdom floating restaurant in Aberdeen Harbour. It took the Hong Kong shipbuilders 18 months to construct the motorised vessel using traditional Chinese junk boat designs and materials. It was commissioned by David Yeo, CEO of Aqua Restaurant Group. It was launched in 2006 with a party on top of a building at Central Pier Four. The ship has two decks measuring 1,500 square feet (140 m^{2}) with an upper open air deck cabin with sofas and a lower deck saloon. The ship can accommodate 80 passengers in addition to the crew. It is 28 metres (92 ft) long, and has three crimson sails arranged in a junk rig style. However, the sails are purely decorative, and the barge is motorised. It costs up to HK$80,000 to rent.

== Use ==
The ship is used for pleasure cruises around Victoria Harbour, Hong Kong, with stops at Tsim Sha Tsui, Central, Wan Chai and Hung Hom during the day and Central and Tsim Sha Tsui in the evening. It is also used for day tours to Stanley on weekends, as well as Aberdeen, Cheung Chau Island and Joss House Bay since 2011. It has featured in magazines, on postcards, and in Hong Kong TV shows. In 2011, to mark World Aids Day, the ship was used by Aids Concern for a "Sail in Red" day; students from Li Po Chun United World College were invited aboard and talks were given about the disease. Above & Beyond (group) played their deep warm up set for ABGT300 on 28 September 2018 with family, friends and crew in attendance.

== Aqua Luna II ==
The Aqua Luna II, a second commercial junk boat was launched by the Aqua Restaurant Group in April 2017. The ship was commissioned in 2015 and took two years to complete construction. The ship is constructed out of wood and bamboo under the same shipbuilders and construction techniques measuring slightly bigger than its predecessor at 29 meters (95 ft). The ship is known as Dai Cheung Po (大張保) in Cantonese, meaning Big Brother of Cheung Po Tsai due to its greater size.

== See also ==
- Duk Ling
