= Duk Ling =

Restored sailing ship

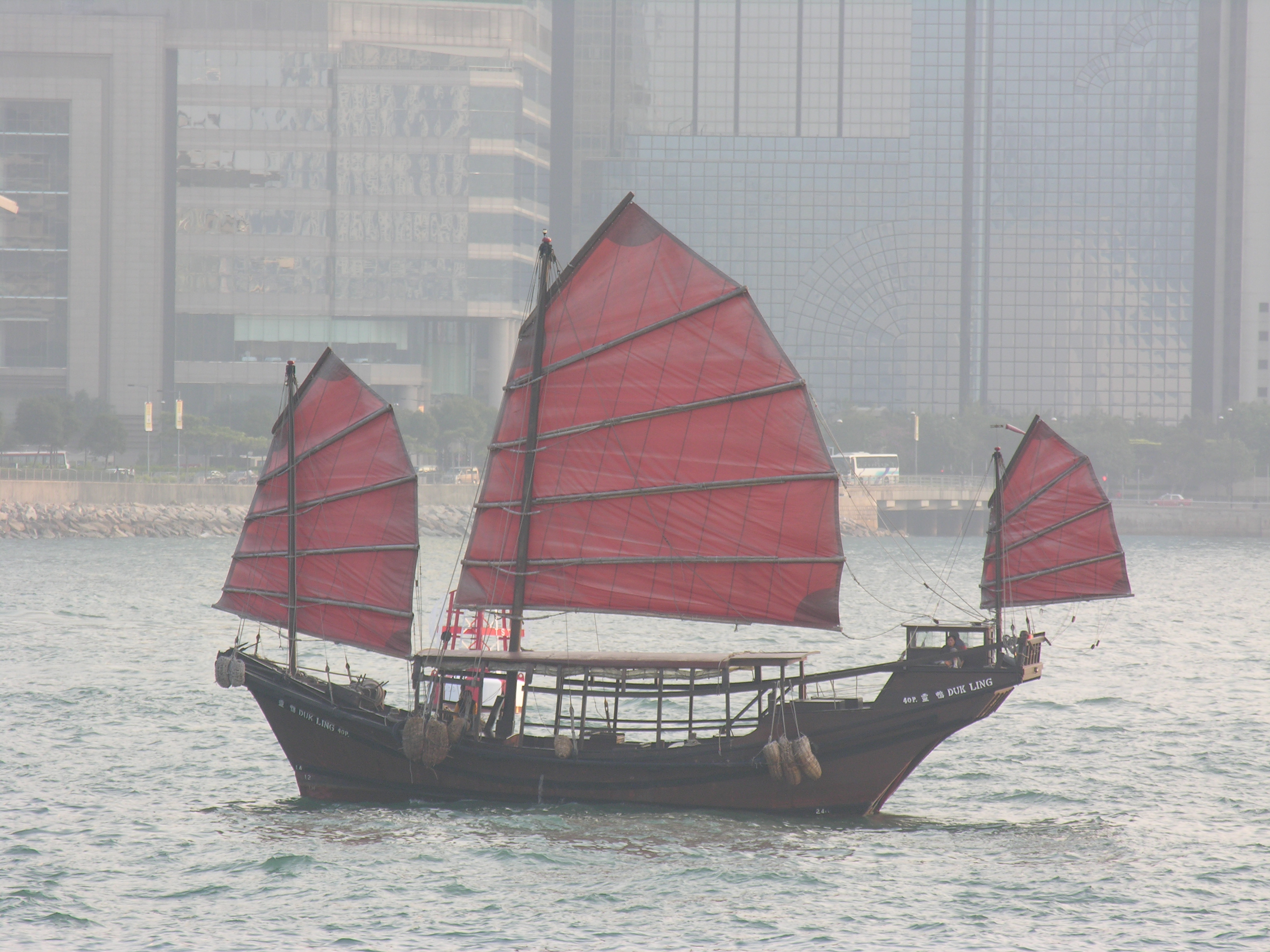
- Duk Ling 鴨靈號 in 2004

History

Hong Kong
- Name: 鴨靈號 (Duk Ling)
- Owner: Detours Limited
- Launched: 1955

General characteristics
- Tonnage: 50 tonnes
- Length: 70 ft (21 m)
- Complement: 30 passengers; Unknown crew

Duk Ling
- Traditional Chinese: 鴨靈號
- Simplified Chinese: 鸭灵号
- Literal meaning: Clever Duck
Transcriptions
Standard Mandarin
- Hanyu Pinyin: Yālínghào
Yue: Cantonese
- Yale Romanization: Aap lìhng houh
- Jyutping: Aap3 ling4 hou6

The Duk Ling is a junk operating in Victoria Harbour, Hong Kong.

== History ==
The Duk Ling was built in Macau around 1955, and was subsequently used as a fishing boat. In 1985 it was purchased by Pierric Couderc, and underwent three years of restoration back to its original design. It was owned by Detours Limited, which was in turn owned by China Pub Company HK Ltd. It has a licensed capacity of 36 passengers. It is claimed to be the last authentic junk in Hong Kong, the other two junks operating in Hong Kong – the Aqua Luna and the V – being replicas of junks purpose-built for tourism in the 1990s and early 21st century.

The Duk Ling foundered and sank in Aberdeen Typhoon Shelter in September 2014 due to strong winds and the storm surge from Typhoon Kalmaegi, which passed by Hong Kong. It was raised from an 18-meter depth in late December. Hong Kong-based yacht traders Yu Lik-hang and his aunt Cheng Ching-wah purchased and refurbished the salvaged hull at an estimated cost of 10 million yuan. The Duk Ling was officially relaunched on 13 June 2015.

== Current use ==
Until 2014, the Duk Ling was chartered by the Hong Kong Tourism Board for two days a week, for sightseeing tours in Victoria Harbour, which were only available to tourists as part of its "Cultural Kaleidoscope" program. Sailings were initially offered free of charge, but a $50 charge was introduced, later increased to HK$100. It sailed between Kowloon Public Pier, Tsim Sha Tsui and Central Pier 9. The Hong Kong Tourist Board trips ended in 2014.

Tours resumed on 13 June 2015 after a "Set Sail Ceremony." The cost of a 45-minute tour of Victoria Harbour was increased to HK$320, and admission is no longer limited to foreign tourists.

It is also used for cruises to Lamma Island, Lei Yue Mun and Po Toi, as well as weddings and wedding receptions. It has been featured in film versions of Around the World in 80 Days, Tai-Pan, and Dragon: The Bruce Lee Story as well as advertisements for Hong Kong.

In October 2020, the Duk Ling's owner, Hazen Tang, said that it was struggling due to the COVID-19 downturn. Its biggest market was overseas tourists, but it swapped its focus onto local Hong Kong citizens during the COVID-19 pandemic. New routes were extended beyond cruising around Victoria Harbour to local residential areas, and the onboard commentary was also changed.

== See also ==
- Aqua Luna
