= Battle of the Tiger's Mouth =

1809–1810 naval battle

- Part of Piracy in Asia
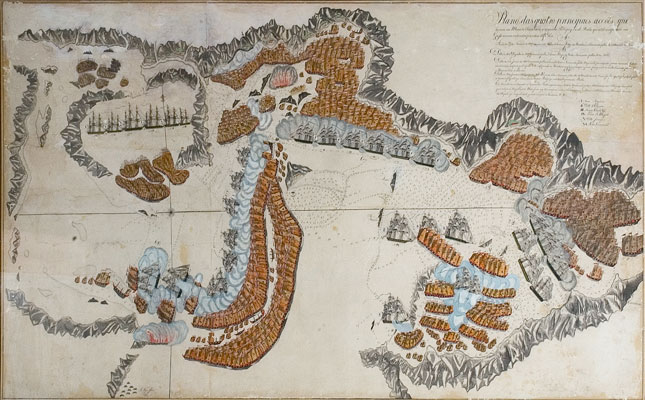
- An illustration of the battle by a Portuguese cartographer
Date	September 1809 – January 1810
Location	Humen, Pearl River Delta
Result	Portuguese victory

Belligerents
Portugal	Guangdong Pirate Confederation

Commanders and leaders
José Pinto e Sousa	Cheung Po Tsai (surrendered)

Strength
1 frigate 5 brigs 1 lorcha	300–700 junks

Casualties and losses
Light	Heavy

The Battle of the Tiger's Mouth (Chinese: 虎門之戰; Portuguese: Batalha da Boca do Tigre) was a series of engagements between a Portuguese flotilla stationed in Macau, and the Guangdong Pirate Confederation of the Chinese Danka pirate Ching Shih, led by her second-in-command, Cheung Po Tsai - known to the Portuguese as Apocha, Cam Pau Sai or Quan Apon Chay. Between September 1809 and January 1810, the Red Flag Fleet suffered several defeats at the hands of the Portuguese led by José Pinto Alcoforado de Azevedo e Sousa, within the Humen Strait - known to the Portuguese as the Boca do Tigre - until the pirates finally surrendered formally in February 1810. After her fleet surrendered, Ching Shih surrendered herself to the Guangzhou city government in exchange for a general pardon, putting an end to her career of piracy.

== Background ==
The decline of local Chinese authority had caused the rise of numerous pirate groups around the commercially important Pearl River Delta. It captured trade vessels, assaulted seaside populations and forced them to pay tribute, but did not interfere with European shipping initially. The most important of these pirate groups was the Red Flag Fleet, formally owned by the widow Ching Shih but de facto led by her second-in-command Cheung Po Tsai, who started engaging in hostile behaviour towards Europeans, namely the Portuguese at Macau, but also the British East India Company, as well as various other nations. Taking the local Cantonese Chinese monks under his protection, Cheung Po Tsai, asserted himself as the leader of a sect to which the pirates adhered. Indeed, the Macanese rumoured that the Cheung Po Tsai even aspired to becoming Emperor of China.

Powerless to fight the pirates, in desperation the Qing authorities turned to the Europeans. The Chinese mandarin of Qianshan had requested Portuguese military assistance at Macau as early as 1791. In 1793, the pirates captured a Portuguese vessel and massacred everyone on board save four, and in 1796 another Portuguese ship was seized by the pirates who once again killed everyone on board. In 1804 they occupied the Taipa anchorage, threatening the city, and later that year disrupted communications between Macau and Lantau, causing difficulties to the supply of ships anchored there. In the middle of 1807, a pirate squadron had attacked a Portuguese brig commanded by captain Pereira Barreto, nicknamed "Sea Tiger" by the Chinese, yet Barreto not only repulsed the pirates but captured their flagship in a boarding action with 70 men.

As part of the Napoleonic Wars, British forces briefly occupied Macau in September 1808 in order to prevent the colony from falling into French hands, though they did not make any moves against Chinese pirates. By the time the outstanding Pereira Barreto left Macau, Chinese piracy threatened to cut off local Macanese shipping. On 5 September 1809, the pirates captured a Portuguese trade ship coming from Timor, killing all its crewmembers. Subsequently, the Loyal Senate of Macau (the Leal Senado) armed three ships, commanded by artillery captain José Pinto Alcoforado de Azevedo e Sousa with categorical orders to conduct a punitive expedition against the pirates and curb their activities.

== First encounters, September 1809 ==
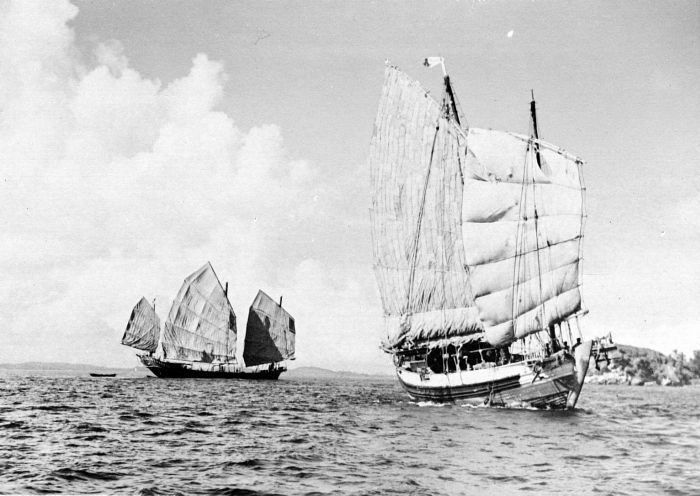
The lorcha was a hybrid ship combining Portuguese hull design with Chinese rigging

Portuguese flotilla September 1809 39 artillery pieces 250 men
Name	Notes
Princesa Carlota	Brig, 16 artillery pieces, 100 men crew, commanded by artillery captain José Pinto Alcoforado de Azevedo e Sousa
Belisário	Brig, 18 artillery pieces, 120 men crew, commanded by alferes José Félix dos Remédios
Leão	Lorcha, 5 artillery pieces, 30 men crew commanded by pilot José Gonçalves Carocha

A few days later by nightfall, the brigs Princesa Carlota and the Belisário left Macau to seek out the Chinese pirate fleet. The Princesa Carlota and the Belisário were supplied by the lorcha Leão, crewed by 30 Chinese sailors and commanded by pilot Gonçalves Carocha. The lorcha was attacked during a supply run by a squadron of pirate junks, the Portuguese repelled them with their modern rifles and rifled cannon that fired explosive shells. The following day, the lone Leão was ambushed by 16 junks. It suffered great losses and risked being boarded until its last 8 crewmembers mutinied against Carocha and took the ship back to Macau. The crewmembers were then banished and Carocha regained his post and a new crew, and the following day joined the Princesa Carlota and the Belisário.

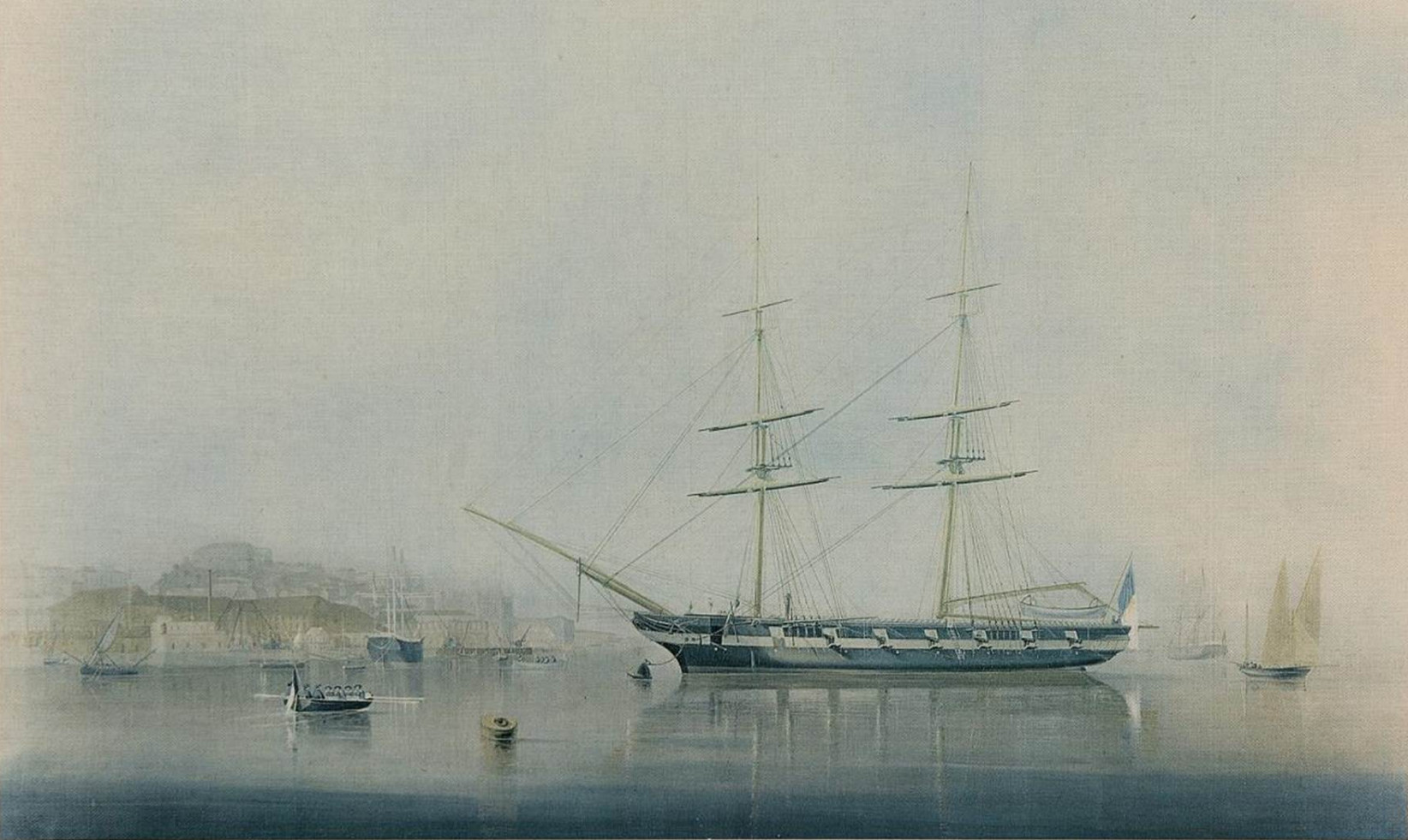
19th century Portuguese brig.

After weeks of negotiations with the Qing, on September 15 the East India Company agreed to help out against the pirates with the frigate Mercury, then anchored at Macau. That same day, the Portuguese set out to meet the pirate fleet once again, but the Mercury remained in harbour and took no further action against the Chinese. The Portuguese sighted 200 ships commanded by Cheung Po Tsai at anchor at a place they identified as the Wam-pao channels. The pirates sailed out to meet the Portuguese and a heavy artillery exchange followed until sunset. The pirates eventually scattered heavily damaged by Portuguese artillery fire, while the Portuguese returned to Macau with one of their brigs damaged by the pirates and the other by the recoil of its own guns.

Using a Portuguese merchant as intermediary, the prestigious and energetic ouvidor (head-judge) Miguel José de Arriaga Brum da Silveira convinced the Qing viceroy of Guangzhou not to accept any help from the British and to instead collaborate with Portugal against the pirates. The viceroy dispatched official emissaries to Macau to discuss the joint operation, and in November 23 they signed a document with seven articles, in which the Portuguese agreed to provide 6 ships and the Chinese government 60 against the pirates, and also to pay the Portuguese 80,000 taels to cover the expenses of outfitting their fleet, and to restore old rights of the city of Macau.

== Second encounter, November 29, 1809 ==
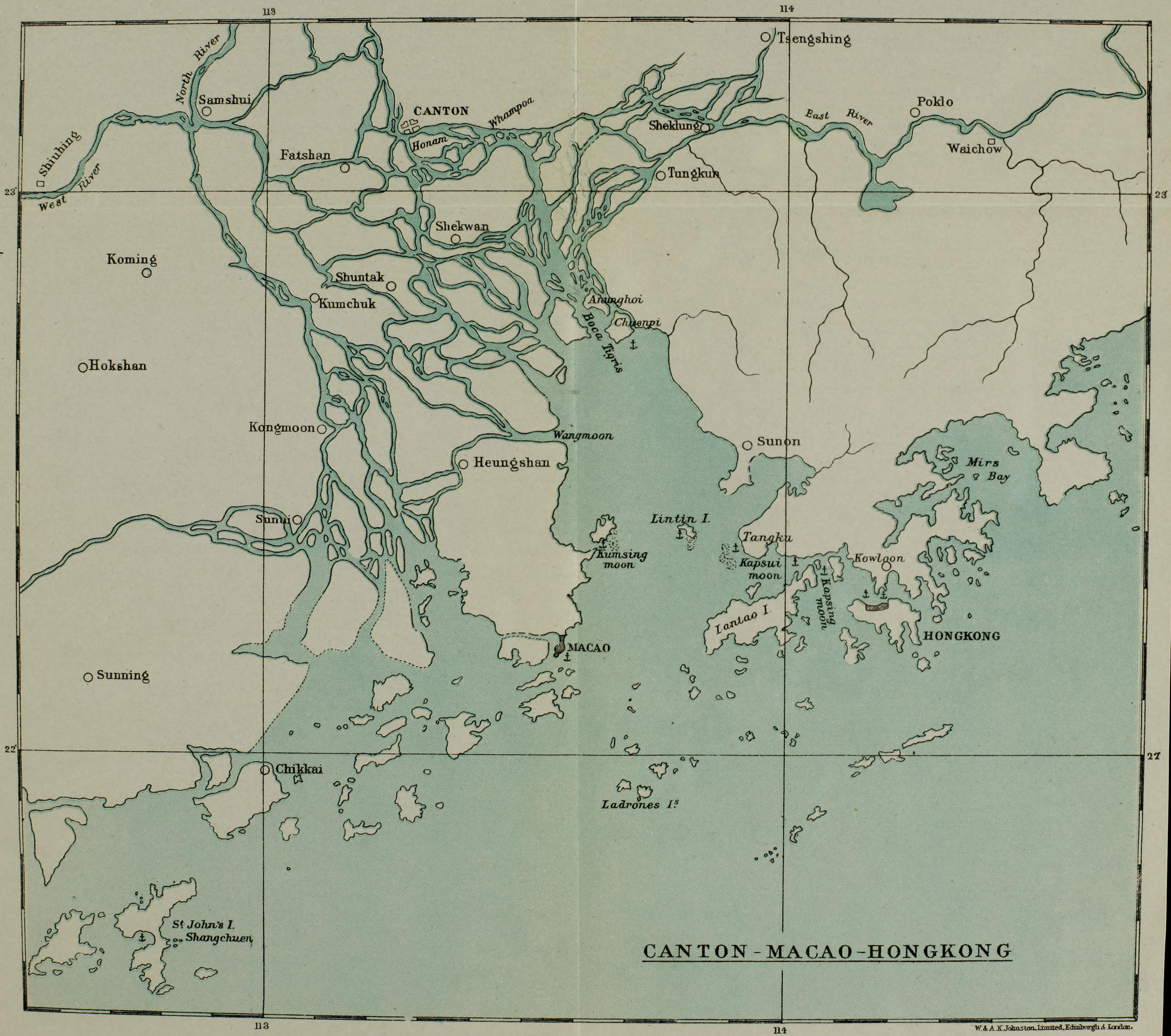
The Pearl River Delta, with Humen marked as Bocca Tigris ("Tiger's Mouth") where the heaviest fighting took place

Portuguese flotilla November 1809 120 artillery pieces 760 men
Name	Notes
Inconquistável	Frigate, 26 artillery pieces, 160-man crew, commanded by artillery captain José Pinto Alcoforado de Azevedo e Sousa
Indiana	Brig, 24 artillery pieces, 120-man crew, commanded by alferes Anacieto José da Silva
Belisário	Brig, 18 artillery pieces, 120-man crew, commanded by alferes José Félix dos Remédios
Conceição	Brig, 18 artillery pieces, 130-man crew commanded by pilot Luís Carlos de Miranda
São Miguel	Brig, 18 artillery pieces, 130-man crew, commanded by pilot Constantino José Lopes
Princesa Carlota	Brig, 16 artillery pieces, 100-man crew, commanded by pilot José Gonçalves Carocha

The governor of Macau Lucas José de Alvarenga invested Arriaga with the powers of Superintendent of the Navy and tasked him with organizing the new squadron. Owing to his influence Arriaga had four more ships ready for combat within just five days. They were crewed by 630 Asians and 100 more reliable Portuguese and Macanese sailors. Together with the Imperial fleet of 60 junks with 1200 cannon and crewed by 18,000 men, this was the largest spectacle of naval strength ever seen in the seas around Macau.

On November 29, the Portuguese flotilla set out for the Humen Strait to link up with the Qing fleet, however as the pirates were likely aware of the arrangement, they attempted to intercept the Portuguese, and clashed just a few hours after the Portuguese had left Macau. The Portuguese fought for about nine hours against 200 pirate junks until the pirates had lost some fifteen vessels sunk or burned and several more damaged, and retreated. The pirates regrouped, and attacked the Portuguese again, only to suffer further losses. The Qing fleet had refused to engage and the Portuguese returned to Macau.

== Final encounters in December 1809 and January 1810 ==
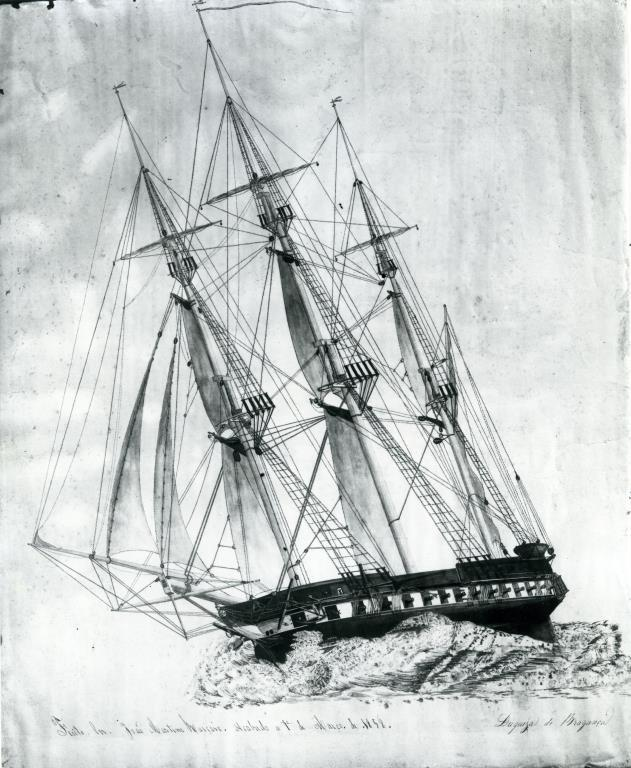
19th century Portuguese frigate.

Portuguese flotilla December 1809 and January 1810 120 artillery pieces 760 men
Name	Notes
Inconquistável	Frigate, 26 artillery pieces, 160 men crew, commanded by artillery captain José Pinto Alcoforado de Azevedo e Sousa
Indiana	Brig, 24 artillery pieces, 120 men crew, commanded by alferes Anacieto José da Silva
Belisário	Brig, 18 artillery pieces, 120 men cew, commanded by alferes José Félix dos Remédios
Conceição	Brig, 18 artillery pieces, 130 men crew commanded by pilot Luís Carlos de Miranda
São Miguel	Brig, 18 artillery pieces, 130 men crew, commanded by pilot Constantino José Lopes
Princesa Carlota	Brig, 16 artillery pieces, 100 men crew, commanded by pilot José Gonçalves Carocha

Cheung Po Tsai decided to risk a decisive battle and on the 11th of December he moved his entire fleet close to Macau, divided in three squadrons. The Portuguese set out to sea and the pirates lost a further 15 ships before again retreating.

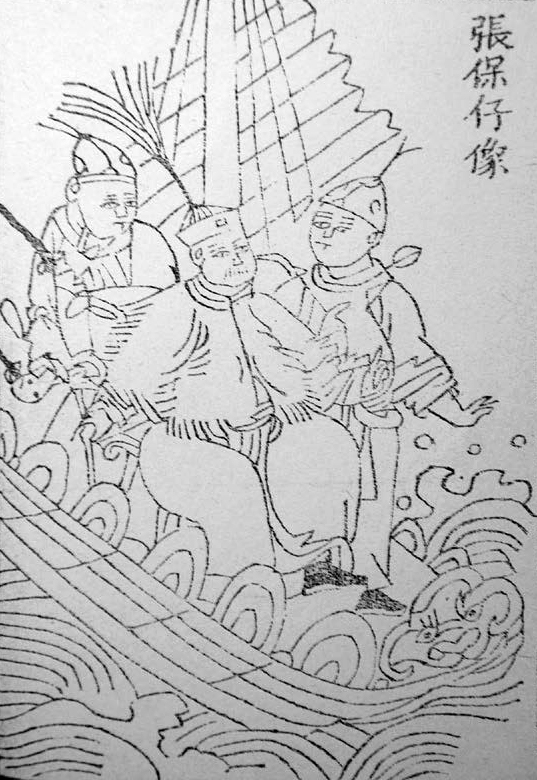
Chinese engraving of Cheung Po Tsai, or Quan Apon Chay

Shortly after the 11 December battle, the Senate of Macau had Alcoforado deliver a letter to Cheung Po Tsai threatening to pursue hostilities until his demise if he didn't surrender to the Qing, but he refused. Instead proposed a separate peace with the Portuguese. Portuguese authorities however refused to break with the Qing. On 26 December 1809, Cheung Po Tsai wrote Alcoforado another letter in which he declared that his ultimate goal was the Imperial throne, and he promised to grant Portugal two or three Chinese provinces if the Portuguese would help him with four ships in this endeavour.

"Yesterday I received a very persuasive message from you in which you state your desire to meet with me in Macau. I thank you for the compliment. I reign from the seas just as from the centre of a kingdom, wielding the sceptre of power and governing all those who obey me. I am therefore extremely busy. Government is no easy task and for that reason I am, unfortunately, unable to accept your invitation. At present my sole aim is to regain control of this territory and I shall not rest until I have accomplished it. I would be able to achieve my objective sooner if you were willing to lend me four ships. In return I should give you two or three provinces of your own choice. Please trust my offer. As regards the ships, if you cannot send them to me immediately then do so at your own convenience. Many people have advised me to surrender to a Tartar. These are nothing more than vain exhortations. While I am in command of this red flag fleet I shall do my utmost to gain the Imperial Throne. I have already ordered my fleet to sail to Boca do Tigre and defeat the usurpor's army. I have several other matters to communicate to you but I am not able to do so at present. The above should serve to inform you of my true intentions".

— Cheung Po Tsai, 26 February

The Portuguese were not interested in treason and rejected this too.

The Black Flag Fleet then suffered another heavy blow, in the form of the defection of an ally or vassal pirate fleet, the Black Flag Fleet, to the Chinese authorities, under an offer of redemption.

After this, Cheung Po Tsai tried a new tactic and sent out a small group of smaller and faster ships to distract the squadron of Alcoforado. The bulk of the fleet was then shifted to narrow channels were they could not be reached by the heavier Portuguese ships. Cheung Po Tsai also forced American and British prisoners to teach his crew how to properly use cannon. British merchants also supplied the pirates with weapons and ammunitions in the hopes that the Portuguese would be defeated, so that the Qing would have to turn to them for help instead.

Alcoforado inflicted further losses on the Chinese fleet in two more separate engagements, on January 3 and 4. Finally, on January 21 Alcoforado anchored his flotilla by Lantau Island and Cheung Po Tsai mobilized his entire fleet, numbering over 300 ships, 1500 guns and 20,000 men, in a last-ditch attempt to defeat the Portuguese. In spite of their numbers, the pirate fleet had great difficulties maneuvering around the small Portuguese fleet without blocking each other's path or line of fire; Portuguese gunners on the other hand could accurately hit the concentrated mass of enemy junks. The Conceição ran aground and risked being boarded by an overwhelming number of enemies, but with the help of the Princesa Carlota commanded by Gonçalves Carocha, the Conceição refloated at the end of an hour and rejoined the battle. Carocha ordered his artillery to fire on a great floating pagoda in the center of the pirate fleet, and upon seeing the pagoda-ship sink, the pirate fleet scattered. Most retreated into the shallow Hiang San river mouth or bay, where Portuguese ships couldn't enter due to their larger draught.

Alcoforado had his ships form a line across the bay and thus the pirate fleet was finally cornered inside.

== Aftermath ==
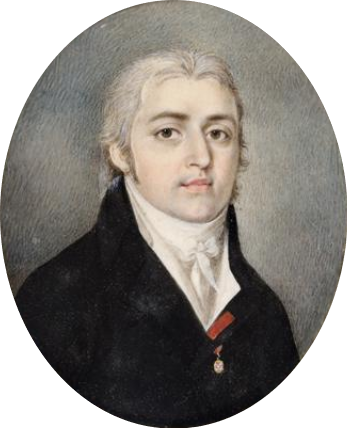
Ouvidor Miguel José de Arriaga Brum da Silveira distinguished himself as a mediator between the Chinese government and the pirates, allowing their integration into the Chinese navy.

At the end of two weeks of blockade, on the 21st of February Cheung Po Tsai finally messaged Alcoforado agreeing to surrender, on the condition that Arriaga was present during the negotiations as a mediator and guarantor. The Macanese authorities informed the Viceroy of Guangzhou, who in turn forwarded the news to the Emperor. At that time however, Arriagas term as ouvidor expired and he was succeeded in office by João Baptista de Guimarães Peixoto, who had a bad reputation. Peixoto attempted to replace Arriaga at the head of negotiations but this turned the people of Macau against him and as the Qing and Cheung Po Tsai would accept nobody else, Arriaga was allowed to remain at the head of negotiations.

Meanwhile, the blockade of the pirate fleet proceeded and the governor of Macau kept issuing orders to Alcoforado, who "was sensible enough to ensure that they were not carried out otherwise all the efforts put into the expedition would have been wasted" in the opinion of the Senate of Macau. During this time, Cheung Po Tsai expressed his desire to meet Alcoforado. Against the advice of his officers who warned of a trap, the Portuguese commander ordered them to avenge him if it was and boarded a dinghy to meet Cheung Po Tsai aboard his flagship, amidst the entire pirate fleet. He was received at the sound of cymbals and a gun salute. Cheung Po Tsai was deeply impressed and flattered at the level of confidence that Alcoforado displayed towards him, and as a gesture of appreciation released the British and Americans prisoners in his custody. He agreed to surrender and even going as far as admitting that he was just attempting to buy time to break the blockade. After the meeting, Alcoforado returned to his ships, where he was received with another gun salute and the sailors climbed to the masts to salute him.

Back in Macau, governor Alvarenga refused to host the pirate fleet and the signing of the surrender of Cheung Po Tsai in the city. Arriaga therefore was forced to continue talks with Qing emissaries outside the city walls at the Mong Ha Pagoda or Kun Iam Temple, where the Treaty of Wanghia would later be signed. They later met with Imperial delegates at Qianshan and while there they received news of Alcoforados act, which astonished them and helped the Chinese agree to all of Arriagas proposals, along with his own high reputation. They decided to have Cheung Po Tsai take his fleet to Fu Iong Sa near Qianshan and surrender there.

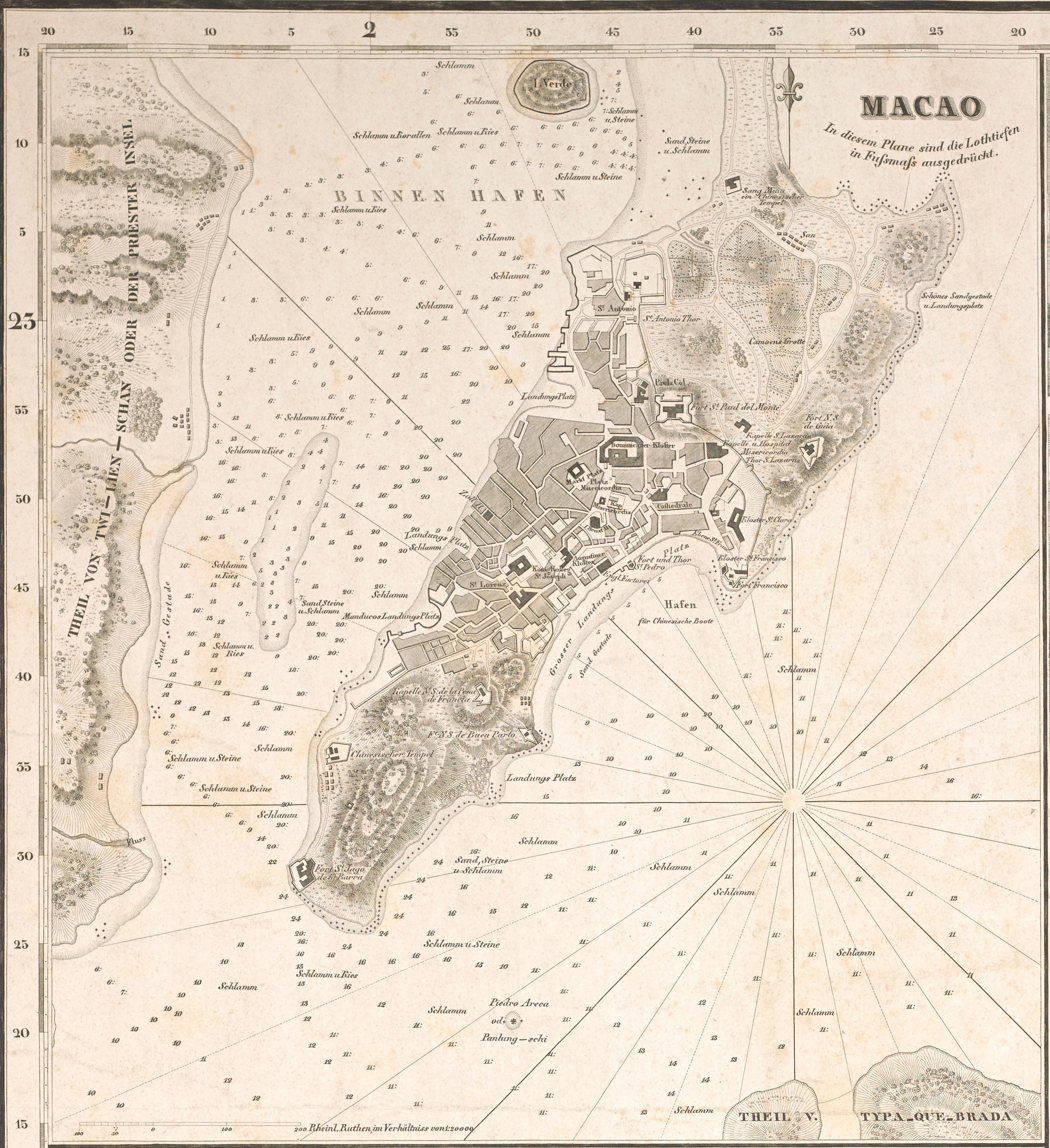
1834 map of Macau.

Thus, on February 21, the pirates signed a peace treaty whereby they agreed to submit to the Chinese Emperor. At the meeting, Cheung Po Tsai demanded to be treated as a free man by the Qing since he had only been defeated by the Portuguese. In exchange, and by direct suggestion of Arriaga, Cheung Po Tsai was rehabilitated and granted the position of admiral under the service of the Emperor to fight other pirates. Thus, no party was prejudiced at the end of the negotiations. Nevertheless, Cheung Po Tsai agree to hand over 14 of his collaborators for the most heinous crimes and atrocities, committed without his consent.

Cheung Po Tsai formally surrendered all of his fleet and weapons, which numbered about 280 ships, 2,000 guns and over 16,000 men, 5,000 women, 7000 swords and spears and 1200 cannon of various sizes, on 15 April 1810. Although the agreement entitled Portugal to half the confiscated goods, the Portuguese claimed naught, which once again greatly impressed the Chinese. It is not known why Arriaga decided on this generous course of action. The signing of the instrument of surrender was done five days later on the 20th and the process complete. 14 of the worst pirates were beheaded and their heads displayed on pikes between Macau and Qianshan, while 126 more were executed, 151 banished for life and 60 were exhiled for two years.

In fulfilling their part of the deal with Portugal, Chinese authorities ultimately kept none of their promises. Arriaga was received triumphantly by the population of Macau. As a reward for his outstanding conduct, Alcoforado was later promoted to the post of governor of Timor. Arriagas efforts were celebrated on the 3rd of June, 1810. Cheung Po Tsai would in the future make formal visits to Macau to meet several of the Portuguese officers present at the fighting, among them Gonçalves Carocha.

== See also ==
- Ching Shih
- Piracy

== Bibliography ==
- Andrade, José Ignácio de (1835). Memórias dos feitos macaenses contra os piratas da China e da entrada violenta dos inglezes na cidade de Macao. Lisbon: Typografia Lisbonense.
- Esparteiro, António Marques (1980). Três Séculos no Mar. Lisbon: Ministério da Marinha.
- Monteiro, Saturnino. Portuguese Sea Battles Volume VIII: Downfall of the Empire 1808-1975 (2013 ed.). Lisbon.
- Murray, Dian H. (1987). Pirates of the South China Coast, 1790–1810. Stanford, California: Stanford University Press. ISBN 9780804713764.
- Siu, Kwok-kin; Puk, Wing-kun (January 2007). "《靖海氛記》原文標點及箋註" [An Annotation on Yuan Yonglun's Jing Hai Fen Ji] (PDF). Fieldwork and Documents: South China Research Resource Station Newsletter (in Traditional Chinese). 46: 6–29.
