= Cheung Po Tsai =

Chinese naval officer and former pirate (1783–1822)

- 張保仔
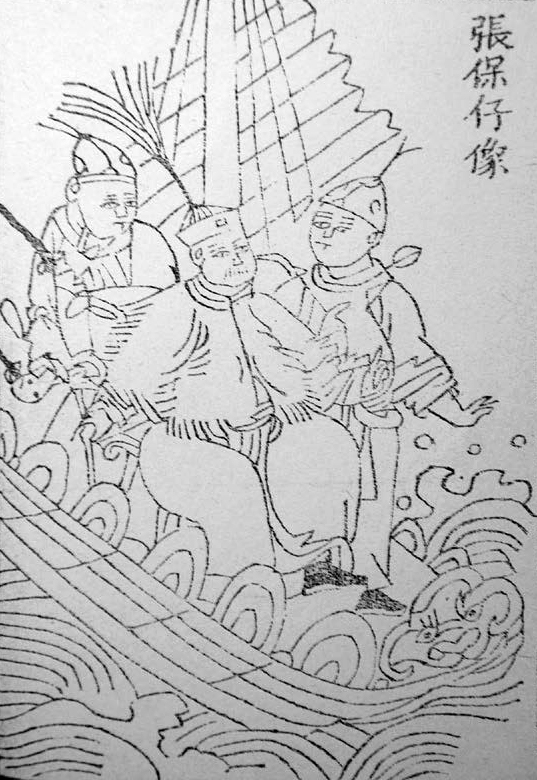
- Born: Cheung Po (張保); 1783; Xinhui, Jiangmen, China
- Died: 1822 (aged 38–39); Penghu, Fujian, China
- Occupations: naval officer, former pirate
- Known for: Well known Chinese pirate
- Criminal charge: Piracy
- Spouse: Ching Shih (m. 1810–1822)
- Children: Cheung Yu Lin (son); 1 daughter
- Parent(s): Cheng I (adoptive father); Ching Shih (former adoptive mother)
- Piratical career
- Nickname: Cheung Po Tsai
- Type: Pirate
- Allegiance: Guangdong Pirate Confederation
- Years active: 1798–1810
- Rank: second-in-command
- Base of operations: South China Sea
- Commands: Red Flag Fleet
- Battles: Battle of the Tiger's Mouth; Naval Battle of Chek Lap Kok
- Later work: Cantonese Naval officer

Cheung Po Tsai
- Traditional Chinese: 張保仔
- Simplified Chinese: 张保仔
- Literal meaning: Cheung Po the Kid
Transcriptions
Standard Mandarin
- Hanyu Pinyin: Zhāng Bǎozǎi
- Wade–Giles: Chang Pao Tsai
- IPA: [ʈʂáŋ pàʊtsàɪ]
Yue: Cantonese
- Yale Romanization: Jēung Bóu Jái
- Jyutping: Zoeng^{1} bou^{2} zai^{2}
- IPA: [tsɵ́ŋ.pǒu.tsɐ̌i]

Cheung Po
- Traditional Chinese: 張保
- Simplified Chinese: 张保
Transcriptions
Standard Mandarin
- Hanyu Pinyin: Zhāng Bǎo
- Wade–Giles: Chang Pao
- IPA: [ʈʂáŋ pàʊ]
Yue: Cantonese
- Yale Romanization: Jēung Bóu
- Jyutping: Zoeng^{1} bou^{2}
- IPA: [tsɵ́ŋ.pǒu]

Cheung Po Tsai (Chinese: 張保仔; born Cheung Po, also transliterated as Zhang Bao or Zheng Bao; 1783–1822) was a Chinese navy colonel and a former pirate. "Cheung Po Tsai" literally means "Cheung Po the Kid". He was known to the Portuguese Navy as Quan Apon Chay during the Battle of the Tiger's Mouth.

== History ==
=== Early life ===
The Cheng family of the Pirates on the China Sea genealogy

Cheung Po (Chinese: 張保) was born in 1783. He was a son of a Tanka fisherman who lived in Xinhui of Jiangmen.

=== Piratical career ===
Around 1798, he was abducted at age 15 by the pirate Cheng I (Chinese: 鄭一), who pressed him into piracy.

His natural talent helped him adapt to his unplanned new career and he rose through the ranks swiftly. Cheung Po Tsai was later adopted by Cheng I and Ching I Sao (Chinese: 鄭一嫂); "wife of Cheng I"; married 1801) as their step-son, making him Cheng's legal heir.

Cheung Po Tsai's piracy mate and lieutenant was Cai Qian (Chinese: 蔡牽) and the two worked together. Cai Qian had strong connections to the Western weapon dealers as his wife Lu Shi (simplified Chinese: 吕氏; traditional Chinese: 呂氏; "Mrs. Lu"), best known by her nickname Cai Qian Ma (Chinese: 蔡牽媽; "wife of Cai Qian"), was fluent in English and an expert in Western weaponry.

=== Rise to command ===
After Cheng I died suddenly in Vietnam in 1807, his widow Ching Shih acted quickly to solidify the partnership with her step-son Cheung Po Tsai. Their first success came when they were able to secure the loyalty of Cheng's relatives, who were leaders in the fleet. They became lovers and shared power.

As Ching Shih's second-in-command, Cheung Po Tsai was active along the Cantonese coast. Their followers were said to have reached 50,000+ and his fleet said to have possessed 600 ships.

The tide began to turn in 1809. The authorities managed to discover that Cai Qian was docked in the coastal town of Wuzhen, Zhejiang province. The new naval leaders of Fujian and Zhejiang, Wang Delu and Qiu Lianggong, blockaded him into the port and attacked, sinking Cai Qian's ship and killing him.

=== Battle of the Tiger's Mouth ===
In September and November 1809, the Guangdong Pirate Confederation suffered a series of defeats inflicted by the Portuguese Navy at the Battle of the Tiger's Mouth.

During the fighting, he revealed to the Portuguese that he coveted the Chinese imperial throne, and on 26th of December 1809 he wrote to the Portuguese commander José Pinto Alcoforado de Azevedo e Sousa proposing that he supply him with four ships to help him in this endeavour and in return he would grant the Portuguese two or three Chinese provinces:

"Yesterday I received a very persuasive message from you in which you state your desire to meet with me in Macau. I thank you for the compliment. I reign from the seas just as from the centre of a kingdom, wielding the sceptre of power and governing all those who obey me. I am therefore extremely busy. Government is no easy task and for that reason I am, unfortunately, unable to accept your invitation. At present my sole aim is to regain control of this territory and I shall not rest until I have accomplished it. I would be able to achieve my objective sooner if you were willing to lend me four ships. In return I should give you two or three provinces of your own choice. Please trust my offer. As regards the ships, if you cannot send them to me immediately then do so at your own convenience. Many people have advised me to surrender to a Tartar. These are nothing more than vain exhortations. While I am in command of this red flag fleet I shall do my utmost to gain the Imperial Throne. I have already ordered my fleet to sail to Boca do Tigre and defeat the usurpor's army. I have several other matters to communicate to you but I am not able to do so at present. The above should serve to inform you of my true intentions".

— Cheung Po Tsai, 26 December 1809

The Portuguese however, refused the offer.

=== Battle of Chek Lap Kok ===
On 20 April 1810 at Furongsha in Guangdong, Cheung Po Tsai formally delivered his fleet and weapons, which now numbered about 280 ships, 2,000 guns and over 25,000 men. The Portuguese claimed naught, while the governor of Guangdong Zhang Bailing accepted his surrender.

=== As Qing Naval Officer ===
Cheung and Ching accepted an amnesty offered by the Qing government, ending their career and allowed to keep the loot. Cheung Po Tsai reverted to his former name. Afterwards, he was capitulated to the Qing dynasty government and became a captain in the Qing's Guangdong navy, receiving the rank of navy colonel. He was given the command of a total of 30 ships, allowed to retain 30 private fleets, and an appointment in Penghu. He would spend the rest of his life helping the government to fight other pirates.

Cheung Po and Ching Shih were later married with Governor Bailing as witness.

Cheung Po would make future formal visits to the Leal Senado of Macau to meet several of the Portuguese officers who were present at the fighting, among them was Gonçalves Carocha.

In 1813, Ching Shih gave birth to his son, Cheung Yu Lin. She would later have a daughter who was born at an unknown date.

== Death ==
After Cheung Po died at sea in 1822 at age 39, his widow moved the family to Macau. There, she opened a gambling house and was involved in the salt trade.

== Legacy ==
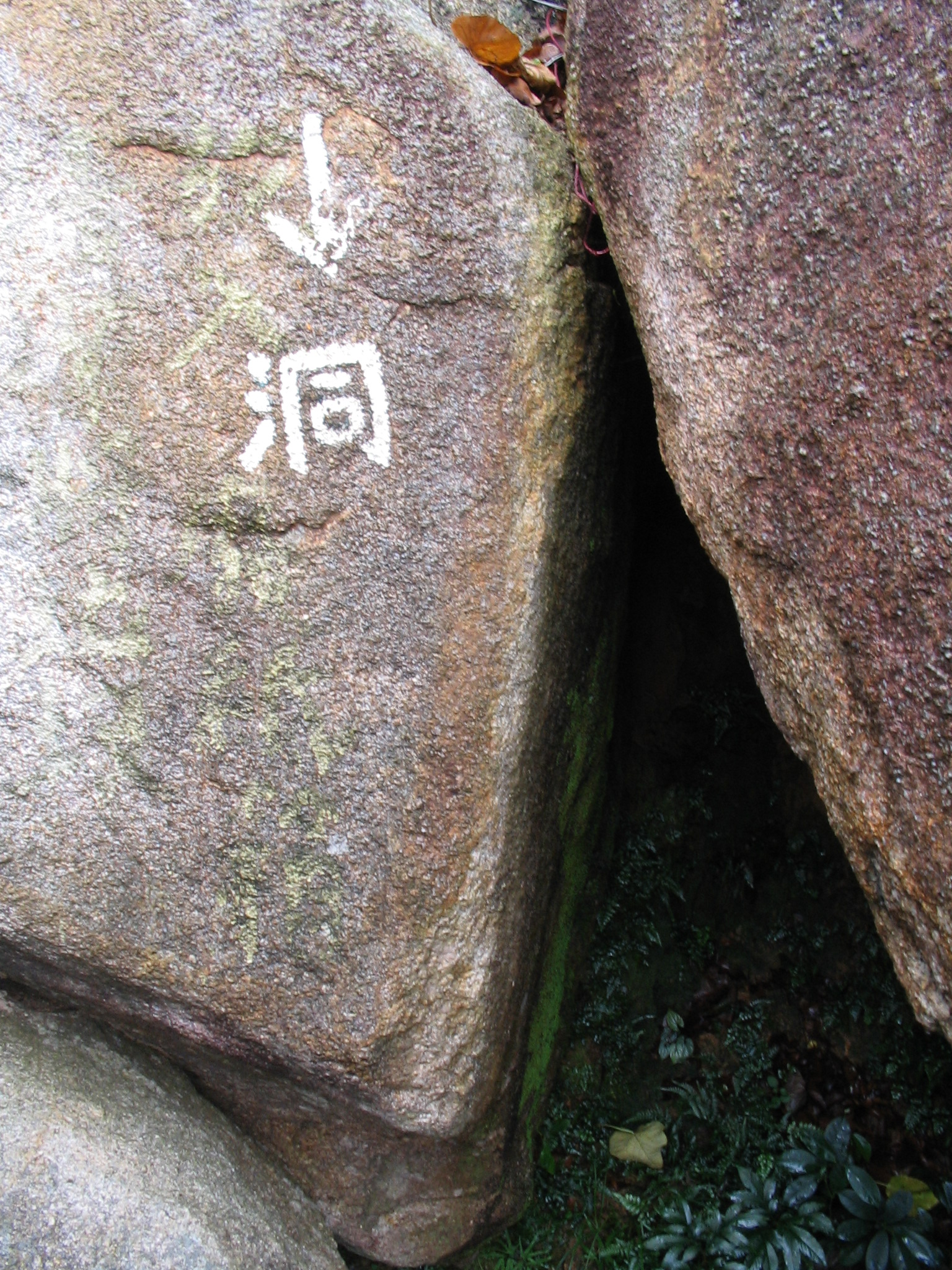
Cheung Po Tsai Cave, Cheung Chau.

Several places in Hong Kong are linked to Cheung Po Tsai:

- Cheung Po Tsai Cave, on Cheung Chau island. It is a small natural cave, said to be the place where he stored his prizes. In addition, there are also Cheung Po Tsai Caves at Lamma Island, Tap Mun, Sai Wan, Chung Hom Kok, Chek Chau, Siu Kau Yi Chau and Longxue Island, Guangzhou.
- Cheung Po Tsai built several temples dedicated to the goddess Tin Hau and seafaring activities on Ma Wan, Cheung Chau, and Stanley.

== In popular culture ==
- The 1973 Hong Kong action film The Pirate (大海盜) has Cheung Po Tsai as its lead character, he was portrayed by Ti Lung.
- The 1983 Hong Kong action film Project A depicts a character based on Cheung Po Tsai. The lead villain, San Po (played by Dick Wei) is a pirate with similar characteristics. Project A's time period is a composite of several in Hong Kong's history.
- The 1994 Hong Kong action film Once Upon a Time in China V has Cheung Po Tsai as one of the main villains opposing the protagonist Wong Fei-Hung. As the movie apocryphally takes place shortly after the Boxer Rebellion, however (over seventy years after Cheung Po Tsai had historically lived), Cheung is depicted in that movie as an extremely old man. He was portrayed by Yee Tin-hung. And Conan Lee Was The Next Role In The Golden Sun Film The King Of The Sea.
- The movie Pirates of the Caribbean: At World's End depicts a pirate named Sao Feng as a member of the Brethren Court. This character is based on Cheung Po Tsai, although the film was set many years before he lived. He is portrayed by actor Chow Yun-Fat.
- In the anime One Piece, one of the characters, Scratchman Apoo, is influenced by Cheung Po Tsai.
- The Aqua Luna junk ship is named after Cheung Po Tsai.
- Tony Hung portrays Cheung Po Tsai in the 2015 Hong Kong television drama Captain of Destiny, a historical sci-fi series about a 21st-century police officer who meets Cheung Po Tsai after traveling back in time.
- The urban legend of Cheung Po Tsai was one of the twelve legends referenced on the TVB series Our Unwinding Ethos.

== See also ==
- Pirates of the South China Coast
