= Chung Hom Kok =

Area in the southern Hong Kong Island

Coordinates: 22.21728°N 114.20467°E

- Chinese: 舂坎角
Transcriptions
Standard Mandarin
- Hanyu Pinyin: Chōng Kǎn Jiǎo
Yue: Cantonese
- Jyutping: zung1 ham1 gok3

Alternative Chinese name
- Chinese: 舂磡角
Transcriptions
Standard Mandarin
- Hanyu Pinyin: Chōng Kàn Jiǎo
Yue: Cantonese
- Jyutping: zung1 ham3 gok3

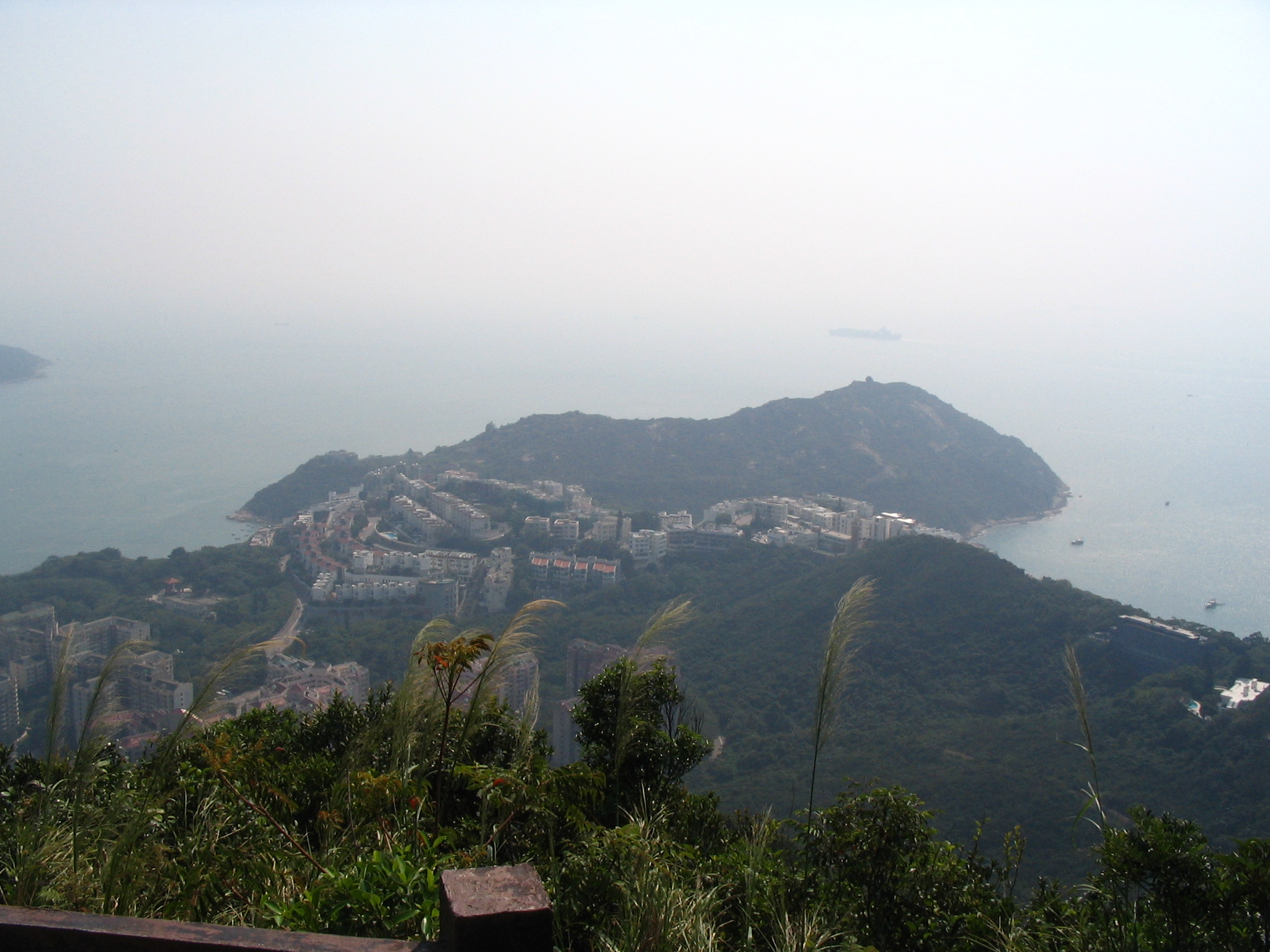
View of Chung Hom Kok from Wilson Trail.

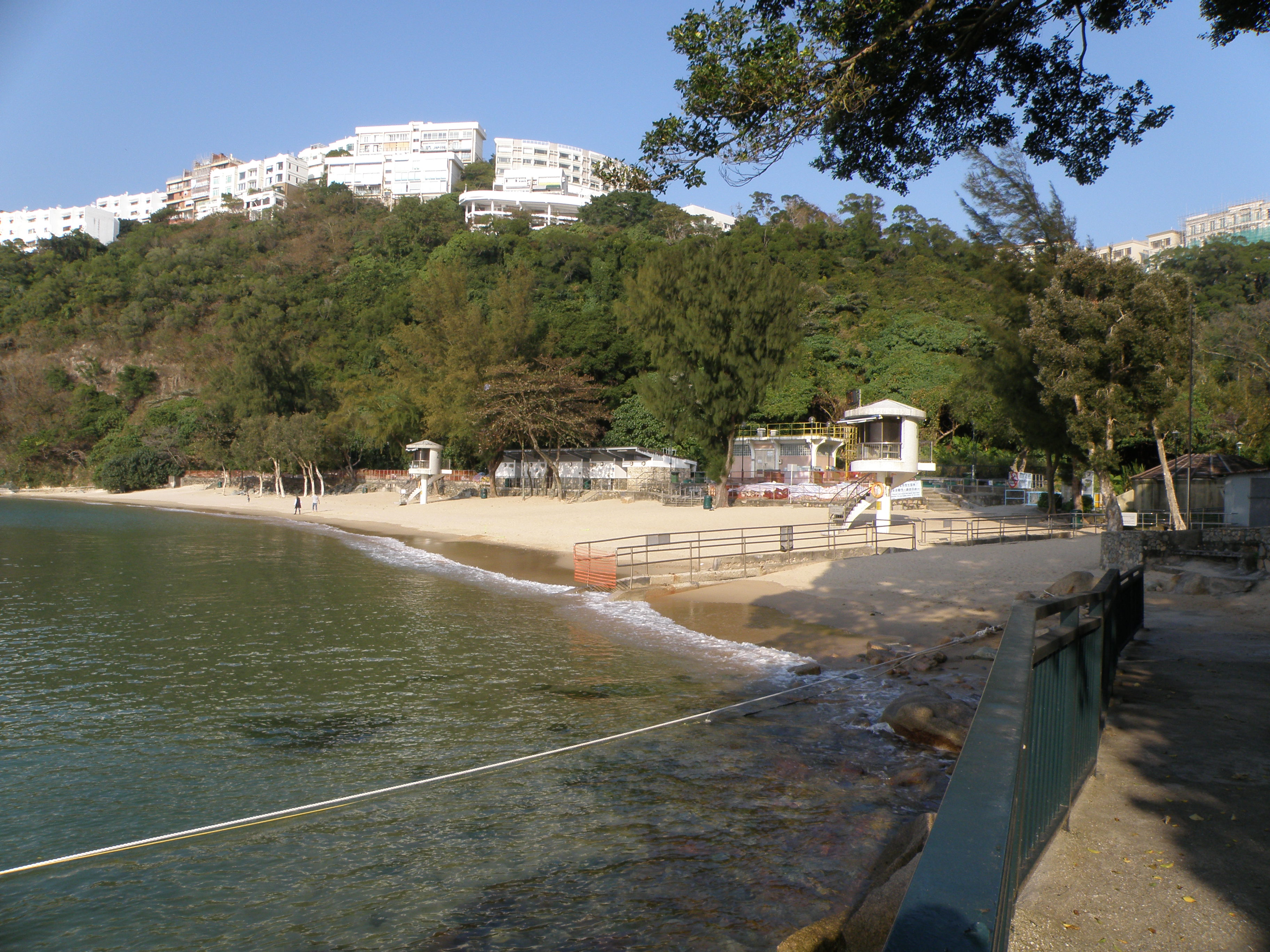
Chung Hom Kok Beach

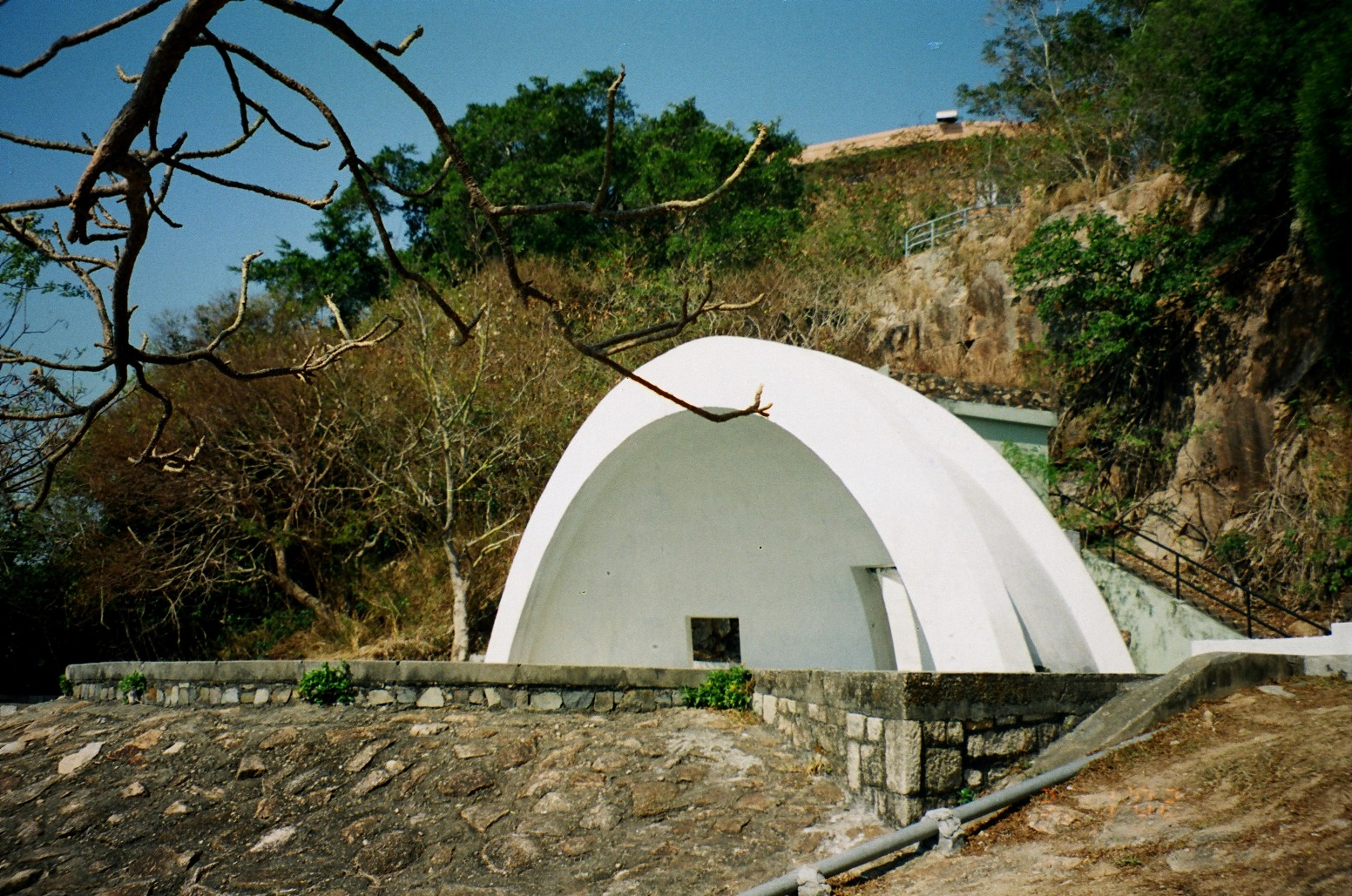
Chung Hom Kok Battery

Chung Hom Kok (Chinese: 舂坎角 or 舂磡角) is an area in the southern Hong Kong Island in Hong Kong. It is a popular site for barbecue and swimming with a beach and lifeguard services available from April to October. West of Stanley, Chung Hom Kok is referred to as the most southern point on a peninsula. The peninsula is also named Chung Hom Kok and the hill Chung Hom Shan (舂坎山) occupies the largest part of the peninsula.

== History ==
At the time of the 1911 census, the population of Chung Hom Kok was 10.

Government Communications Headquarters established a signals intelligence centre at Chung Hom Kok in the late 1970s and consolidated operations there in 1982; the site closed in 1995.

== Features ==
Chung Hom Kok Beach (舂坎角泳灘) is located on the western shore Chung Hom Kok in Chung Hom Wan (舂坎灣).

A Home Ownership Scheme estate and a public housing estate is located in the Ma Hang area, to the northeast of Chung Hom Kok.

Chung Hom Kok Battery, located at the southern end of the peninsula, was built around 1938. It is listed as a Grade II historic building.

A narrow cave called Cheung Po Tsai Cave (張保仔洞) is located along the coast below Chung Hom Kok Battery. It is said that the Qing dynasty pirate Cheung Po Tsai used it as a shelter.

Chung Hom Kok is a hub for internet cables and cable landing stations. SUNeVision Holdings, the largest data centre provider in Hong Kong, constructed two carrier-neutral cable landing stations at Chung Hom Kok since 2020.

== Education ==
Chung Hom Kok is in Primary One Admission (POA) School Net 18. Within the school net are multiple aided schools (operated independently but funded with government money) and Hong Kong Southern District Government Primary School.

== See also ==
- Cheshire Home, Chung Hom Kok
