= Chung Hom Kok Beach =

Beach in Hong Kong Island, Hong Kong

- Beach
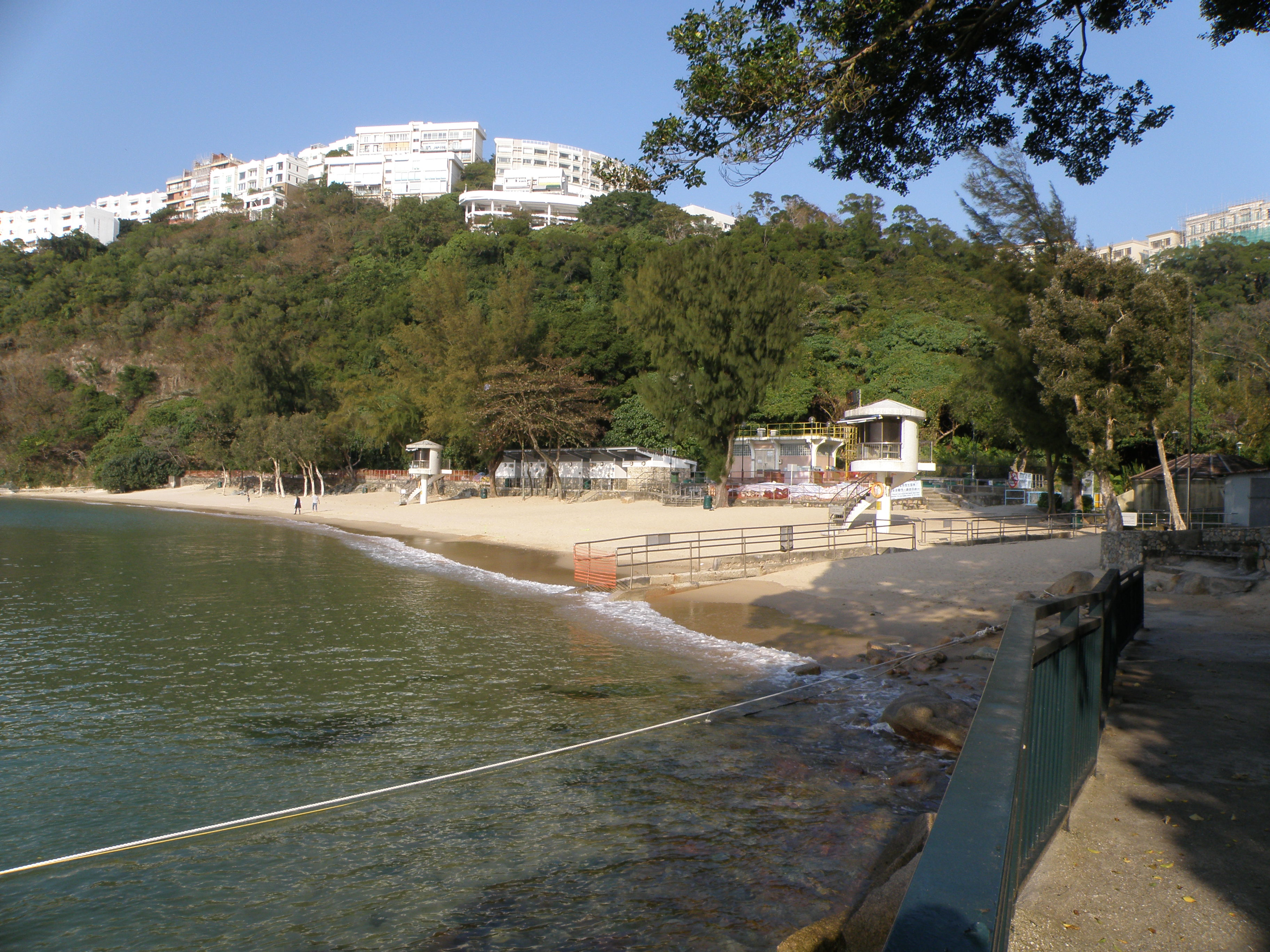
- Chung Hom Kok Beach

- Coordinates: 22.21779°N 114.20211°E
- Location: Chung Hom Kok, Hong Kong Island

Dimensions
  - Length: 169 metres
- Patrolled by: Leisure and Cultural Services Department

Chung Hom Kok Beach
- Traditional Chinese: 舂坎角泳灘
- Simplified Chinese: 舂坎角泳滩
Transcriptions
Standard Mandarin
- Hanyu Pinyin: Chōng Kǎn Jiǎo Yǒng Tān
Yue: Cantonese
- Jyutping: zung1 ham2 gok3 wing6 taan1

Chung Hom Kok Beach is a gazetted beach next to Chung Hom Wan located on the western shore of Chung Hom Kok, Southern District, Hong Kong. The beach has barbecue pits and is managed by the Leisure and Cultural Services Department of the Hong Kong Government. The beach is rated as Grade 1 by the Environmental Protection Department for its water quality.

The beach is about 169 metres long and it offers views of Round Island.

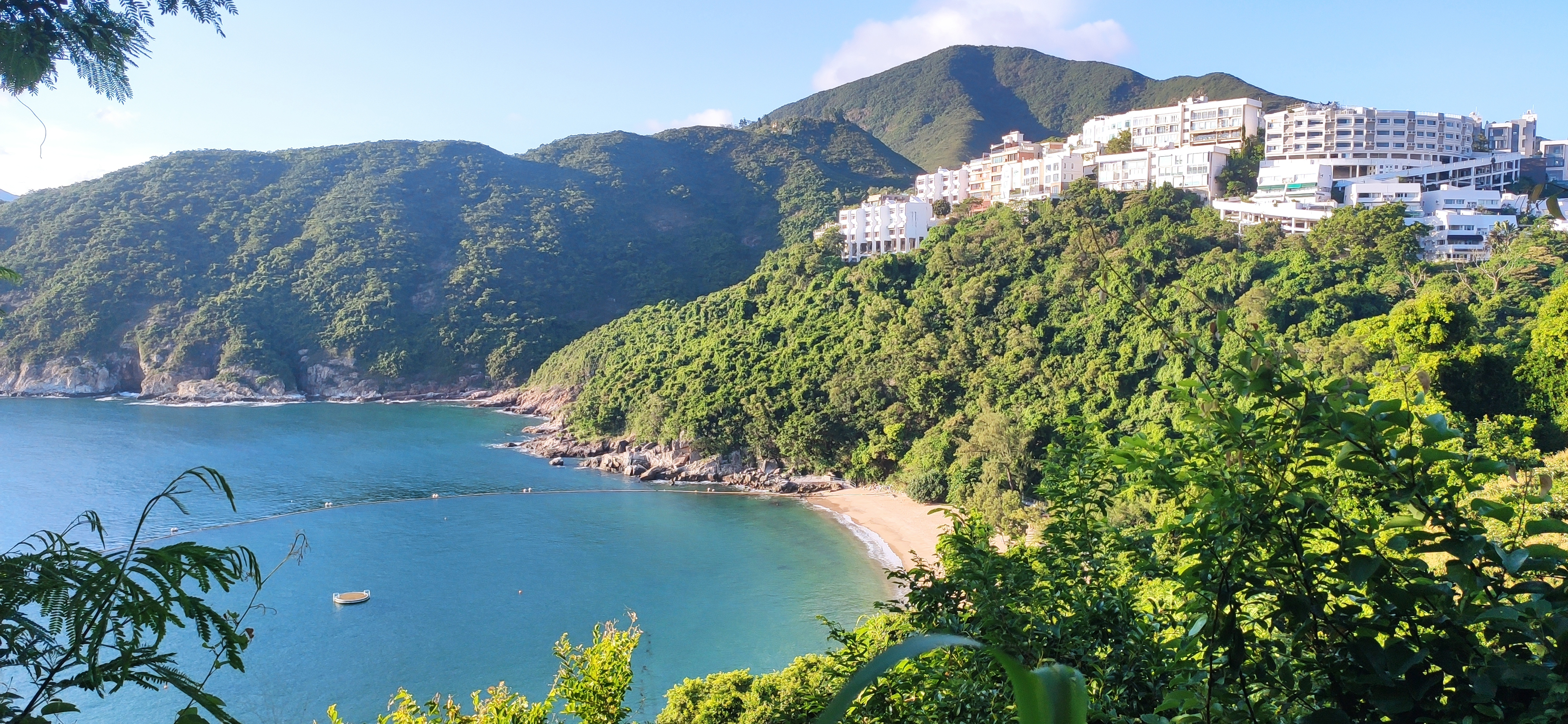
Chung Hom Kok Beach. Ma Kong Shan is visible from the back

== History ==
On 29 March 2021, a red tide was spotted by Environmental Protection Department staff at the beach.

== Usage ==
The beach is a smaller beach compared to other beaches and is one of the popular beaches in Southern District.

== Features ==
The beach has the following features:

- BBQ pits (24 nos.)
- Changing rooms
- Showers
- Toilets
- Light refreshment kiosk
- Water sports centre
- Playground

== See also ==
- Beaches of Hong Kong
