= Guangdong Pirate Confederation =

Pirate fleet active in late-18th-century and early-19th-century China

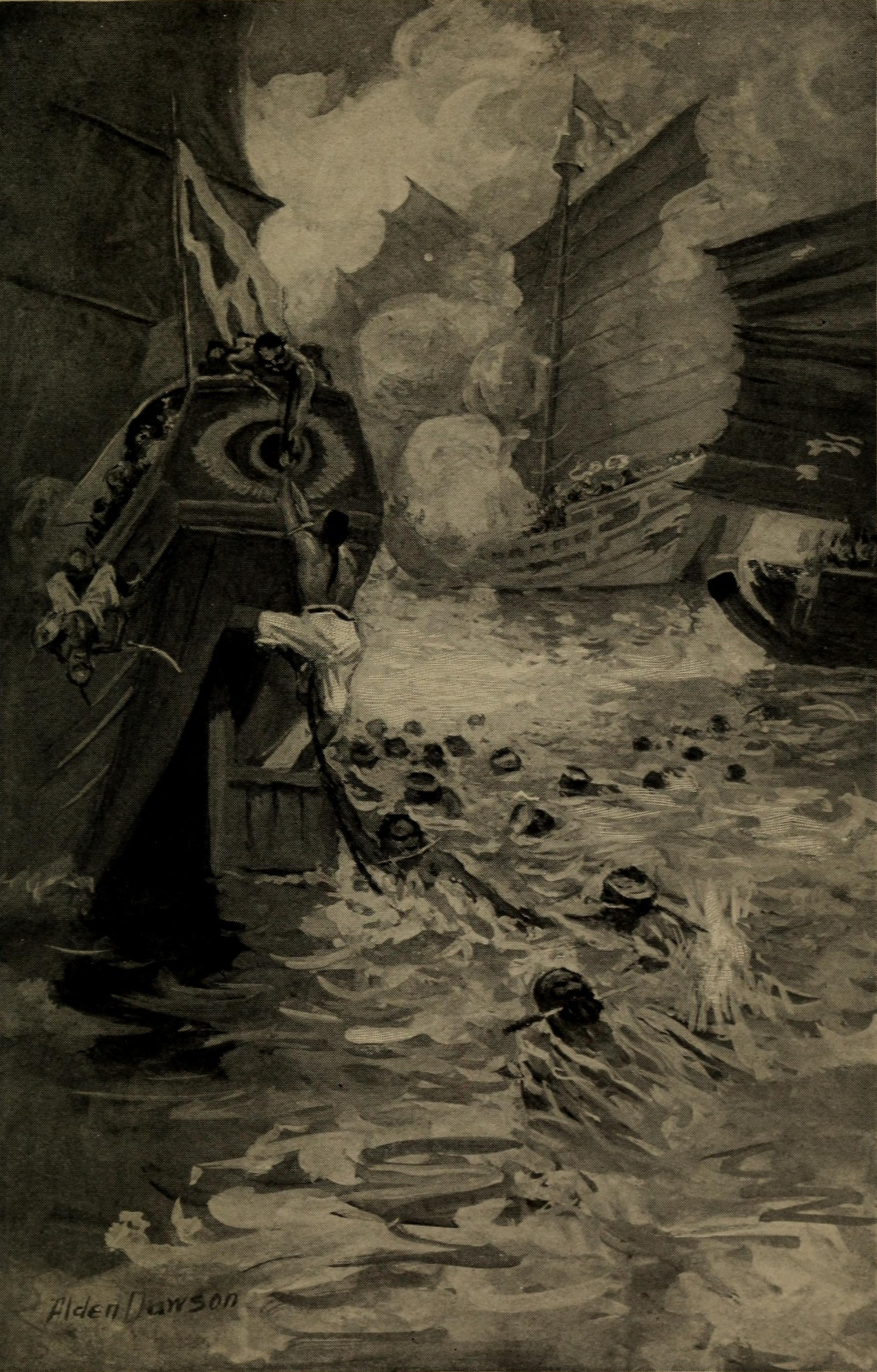
Cheung Po Tsai's pirates fighting the Chinese ships at the battle off Ladrone Islands c. 1808

The Guangdong Pirate Confederation was an alliance of pirate fleets active in late-18th- and early-19th-century China, around the Pearl River Delta. At its height, the confederation had an estimated 400 to 2000 vessels and as many as 50,000 or 70,000 pirates. Faced with determined opposition by official Qing forces and the Portuguese Navy however, it was gradually dismembered until its last members surrendered on April 15, 1810.

== History ==
After the Manchu Qing had displaced the Ming as the ruling dynasty of China, restrictions placed on maritime trade and draconian rules on coastal populations led certain pirate leaders to the Gulf of Tonkin, where they established a number of bases and resisted Qing rule under the banner of Ming loyalism. When the Tay Son Rebellion broke out in Vietnam, the rebel forces sought the support of the pirates by offering them weapons, ships, safe harbours and a share of spoils. Every year the pirates set out to raid southern China and supported the rebel cause until its defeat in 1802. By that point several large pirate alliances had formed and they dominated the coast of northern Vietnam up to Zhejiang.

With tens of thousands of followers by 1801, the leading pirates of the Confederation issued a proclamation challenging Qing rule and stating that "We should follow Heaven’s will and rise up to restore the Ming dynasty. […] On May 1, 1801, the following order has been distributed to our brothers on the sea in Guangdong and Guangxi: we will gather together all the ships on April 15, 1802, and move to conquer the two provinces.”

After Zheng Qi died in 1802, Zheng Yi took over and created a pirate fleet manned by over 10,000 men. By the time Zheng Yi died at the age of 42, he was the most powerful commander in the confederation and its de facto leader. His widow, known as Zheng Yi Sao, seized control of the confederation. Within weeks of her husbands death, Zheng Yi Sao had selected Zheng Yis adopted son and protegé Cheung Po Tsai as her new partner and second-in-command. Though Zheng Yi Sao was acknowledged as supreme commander of the Red Flag Fleet and of the alliance, Cheung Po Tsai was its de-facto leader. Taking the local monks under his protection, Cheung Po Tsai, asserted himself as the leader of a sect to which the pirates adhered. The Macanese rumoured that he even aspired to becoming Emperor of China.

Zheng Qi, Zheng Yi and Cheung Po Tsai were among those criminals considered "great bandits" by Qing authorities, and beyond redemption or leniency in their punishment. The group also included numerous petty chieftains and innumerable gang leaders.

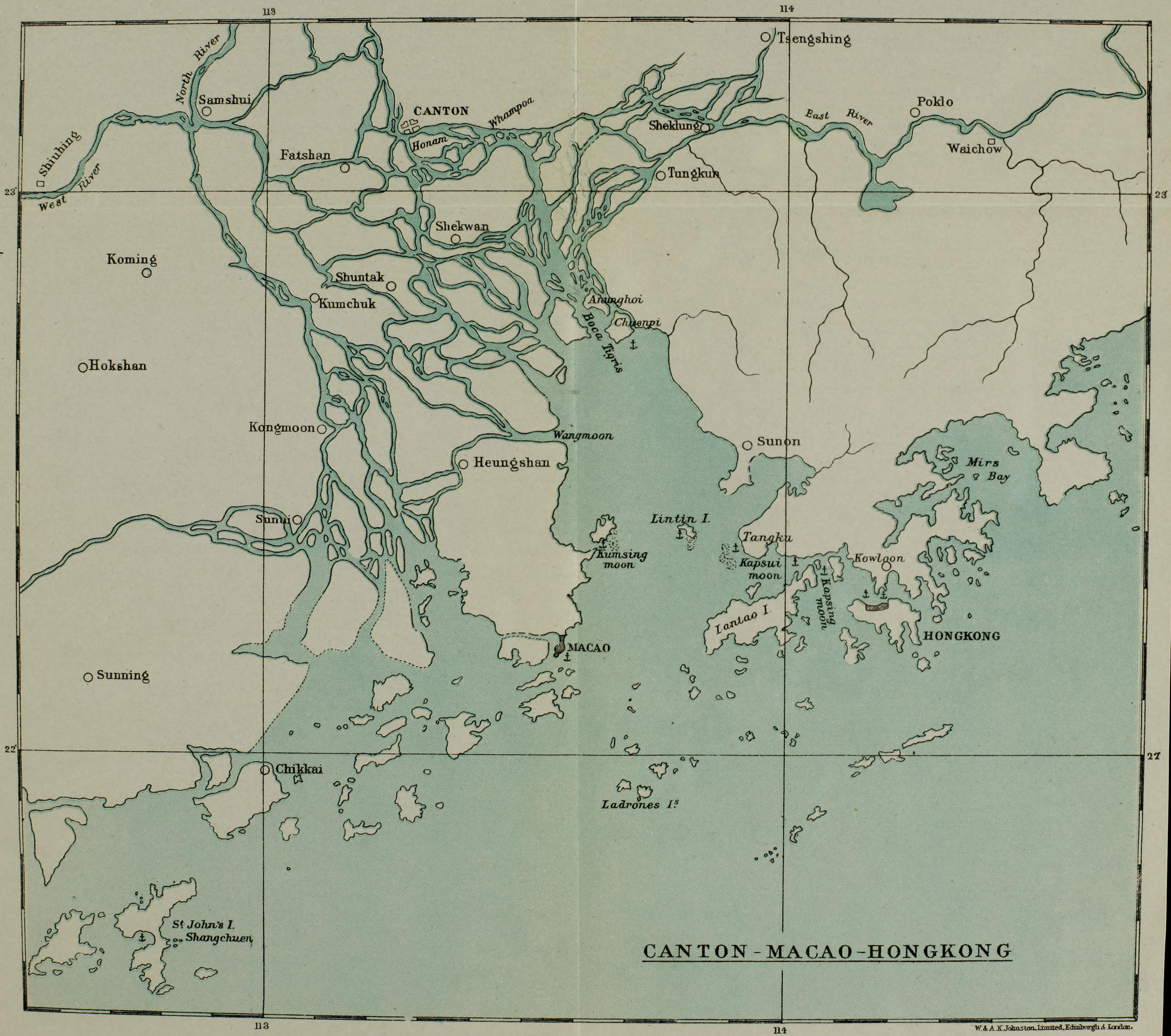
Pearl River estuary

On February 21, 1805, Emperor Jianqing appointed Nayancheng as governor-general of Guangzhou, tasked with eradicating piracy in the region. Nayancheng however found the military conditions in Guangdong to be deeply inadequate for the task at hand, with less than 20,000 naval officers and men and only 83 warships available. These were poorly-armed, poorly manned and larger and less maneuverable than the pirate vessels. He therefore requested 33 more ships, cannon and coastal fortifications to be made and instructed the local gentry and village elders to form militias for self-defense. He also sought to suppress those on land who willingly collaborated with the pirates. In the summer he published throughout the coastal villages and harbours a public appeal for pirates to kill their leaders and surrender. In spite of many problems, by September 1805 Nayancheng was able to muster over 80 ships for a campaign against a pirate stronghold on Guangzhou Bay, which lasted for a month but only a dozen pirate vessels were sunk and 600 pirates killed with a little over 200 taken prisoner. Though this important base was destroyed, the overall strength of the pirates had hardly changed. By December of that year over 3000 people had surrendered to the authorities. The use of redeemed pirates in the army however displeased the Emperor and other high-ranking Guangdong officials, while Nayancheng was found to be overstepping his bounds. He was therefore dismissed in that month. He was replaced with Wu Xiongguang, who was ordered to renew an aggressive "sea war" against the pirates with disastrous consequences, as state forces suffered defeat after defeat without the necessary naval build-up.

By 1807, the Confederation had achieved self-sustenance, with 2000 junks and 50,000 to 70,000 pirates divided into six fleets, each identified by and named after their coloured banners: Red, Black, Blue, Yellow, White and Green. For the followint three years, the Confederation acted like a state unto itself as it levied duties, extracted taxes, issued passes, authorized executions, engaged in trade and defended its territory. After defeating a Qing fleet by the mouth of the Pearl River in late 1808, the rich Guangzhou delta was opened to almost unchecked pirate attacks.

In early 1809, the Emperor appointed Bai Ling as governor of Guangzhou and he enacted harsh measures to try and starve the pirates, organizing convoys, blocaking the supply of gunpowder and recruiting irregulars. The response was immediate and violent as the pirates erupted into the inland waters and countryside searching for food, plundering villages, towns and markets from Macau to Guangzhou. For ten weeks in the summer of 1809 the region remained in a state of siege by the pirates. Bai Ling ordered General Xu Tinggui to engage the pirates directly but he was routed, with over 1000 killed in one encounter, and the rest scattering to engage in plunder also.

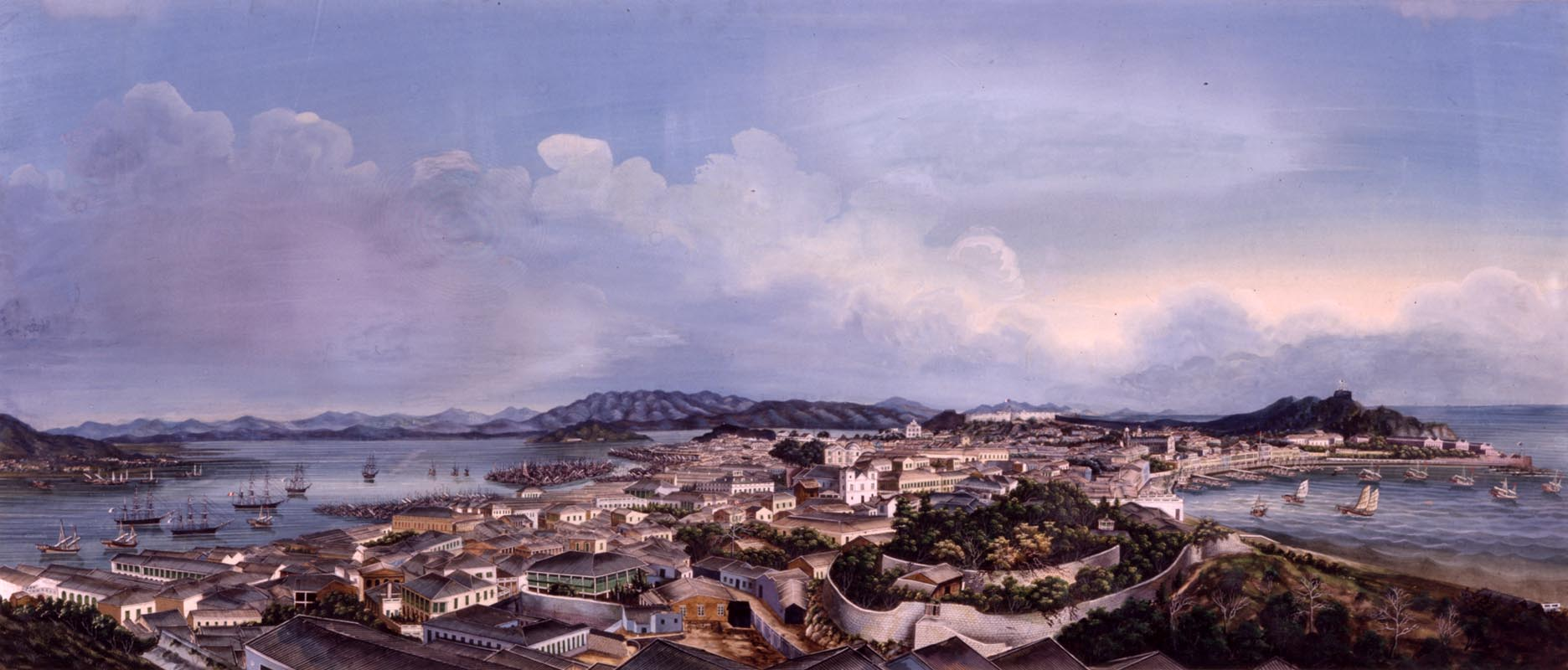
Macau in the 19th century

Powerless to fight the pirates, the Qing authorities turned in desperation to the Europeans. The Mandarin of Qianshan had requested military assistance from the Portuguese at Macau as early as 1791. The Portuguese and had already been attacked by the pirates several times. They had captured a Portuguese ship in 1793 and killed all but four crewmembers, and again in 1796, in which they killed everyone on board. In 1804 pirates occupied the Taipa anchorage, threatening the city, and later that year disrupted communications between Macau and Lantau, which caused difficulties in supplying foreign ships anchored by the island. In the middle of 1807, a pirate squadron had attacked a Portuguese brig but its captain Pereira Barreto not only repulsed the pirates but also captured their flagship in a boarding action with 70 men. In early 1809 the mandarin of Qianshan Peng Zhaolin renewed his request to the Portuguese for aid. Later that year in September 5, the pirates captured a Portuguese brig and killed all its crewmembers. The Portuguese therefore agreed to help the Qing. The Senate of Macau had three ships armed and commanded by José Pinto Alcoforado de Azevedo e Sousa, who was ordered to conduct a punitive expedition against the pirates.

=== The Battle of the Tigers Mouth ===
The flottila under Alcoforado set out to engage the pirates in early September 1809, and they Portuguese were successful owing to the superiority of their armaments, which included rifled cannon and explosive shells. A typhoon then overcame the region and while it raged Portuguese prisoners kept aboard the captured brig managed to break free, and escape from the Red Flag Fleet with their ship to Taipa amid the storm. After weeks of negotiations, on September 15, the British East India Company agreed to help the Qing against the pirates with the frigate Mercury, then anchored at Macau. That same day, the Portuguese set out to meet the pirate fleet once again, but the Mercury remained in harbour and took no further action against the pirates. Further engagements then took place between the Portuguese and the pirates.

The prestigious ouvidor (chief-magistrate) of Macau Miguel José de Arriaga Brum da Silveira convinced governor Bai Ling not to accept any further help from the British, and instead cooperate with Portugal against the pirates. The governor dispatched emissaries to Macau to negotiate a joint operation. Portuguese authorities agreed to supply 6 ships, while the Qing would provide a fleet for the duration of six months, a sum of 80,000 taels to pay for the outfitting of Portuguese ships, and to restore certain former privileges of Macau (none of which they would fulfill). The agreement was laid out in a document with seven articles, signed on November 23 by the Portuguese magistrates Miguel José de Arriaga, José Joaquim de Barros, and the Chinese plenipotenciaries Shing-Kei-Chi, Chu and Pom.

A larger Portuguese flottila made up by the frigate Inconquistável, the brigs Indiana, Belisário, Conceição, São Miguel and Princesa Carlota engaged the pirates on November 29 and December 11.

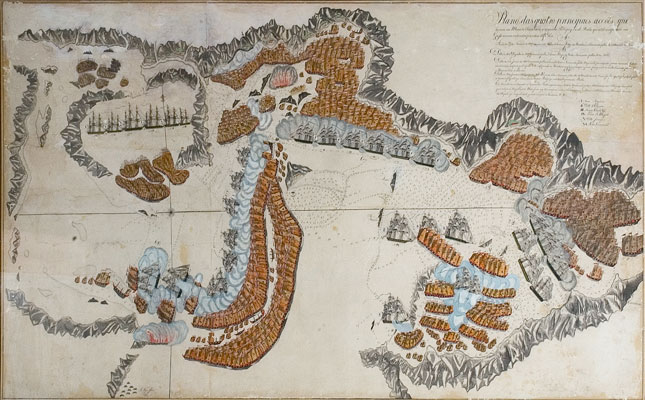
The Portuguese Navy fighting pirates in the Pearl River Delta

Shortly after the engagement on 11 December, the Senate of Macau delivered an ultimatum to Cheung Po Tsai threatening to pursue hostilities until his demise if he didn't surrender. Cheung Po Tsai instead proposed a separate peace but the Portuguese authorities refused to break their commitments with the Chinese government. On 26 December 1809, Cheung Po Tsai wrote another letter in which he declared his ultimate goal to be the Imperial throne and he offered two or three Chinese provinces if the Portuguese would help him with four ships.

Yesterday I received a very persuasive message from you in which you state your desire to meet with me in Macau. I thank you for the compliment. I reign from the seas just as from the centre of a kingdom, wielding the sceptre of power and governing all those who obey me. I am therefore extremely busy. Government is no easy task and for that reason I am, unfortunately, unable to accept your invitation. At present my sole aim is to regain control of this territory and I shall not rest until I have accomplished it. I would be able to achieve my objective sooner if you were willing to lend me four ships. In return I should give you two or three provinces of your own choice. Please trust my offer. As regards the ships, if you cannot send them to me immediately then do so at your own convenience. Many people have advised me to surrender to a Tartar. These are nothing more than vain exhortations. While I am in command of this red flag fleet I shall do my utmost to gain the Imperial Throne. I have already ordered my fleet to sail to Boca do Tigre and defeat the usurper's army. I have several other matters to communicate to you but I am not able to do so at present. The above should serve to inform you of my true intentions.

— Cheung Po Tsai, 26 December 1809

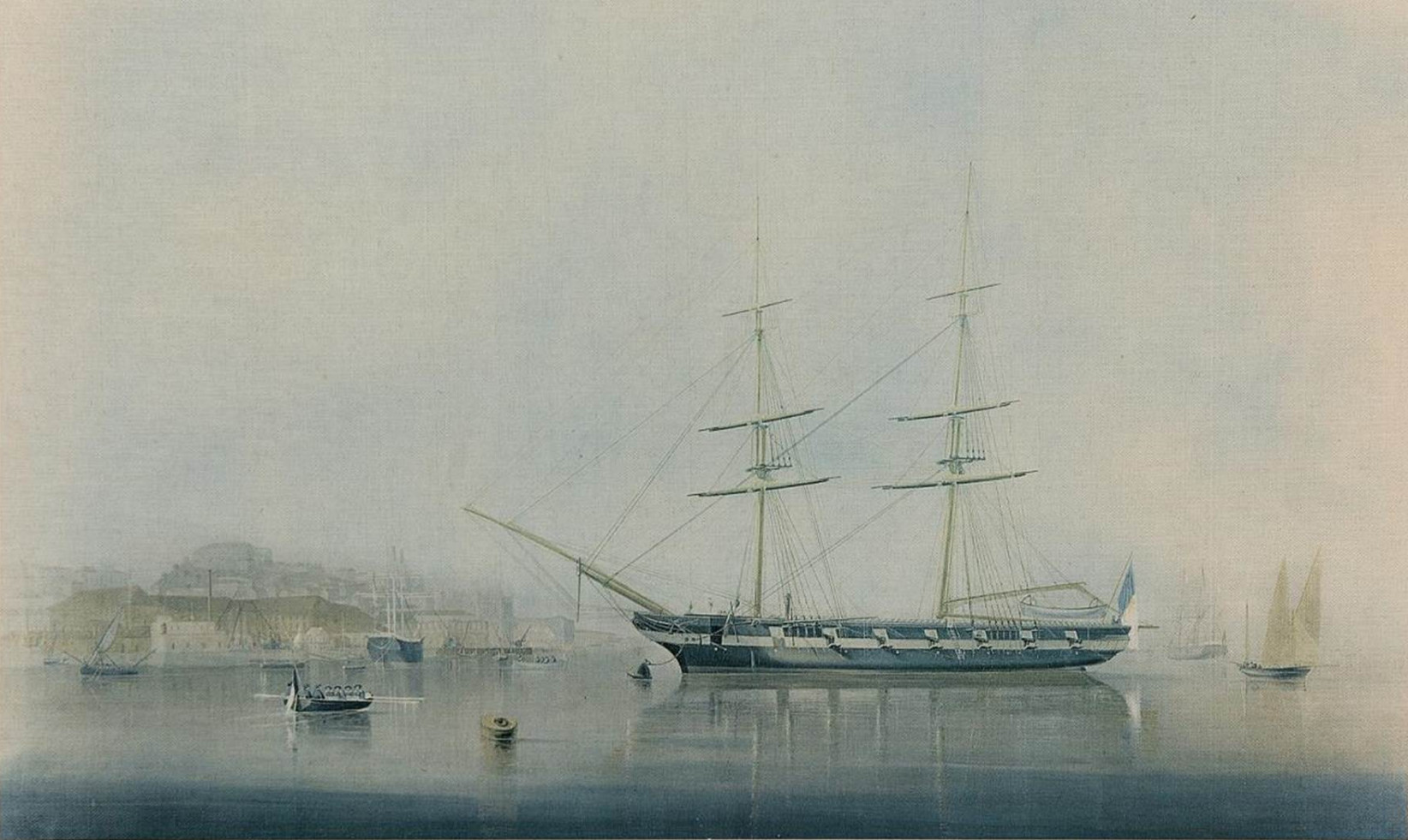
19th-century Portuguese brig

The Portuguese however were not interested in treason and rejected this too. The Confederation suffered another heavy blow shortly afterwards, in the form of the defection to the Chinese authorities of the Black Flag Fleet, under an offer of redemption. Guo Podai, one of the three most important leaders, led 5578 men and 800 women and children to surrender. After this, Cheung Po Tsai relocated most of his vessels to narrow channels were they could not be reached by the heavier Portuguese ships. He also forced American and British prisoners to teach his crewmen how to properly use cannon. British merchants meanwhile supplied the pirates with weapons and ammunition, in the hopes that the Portuguese would be defeated and the Qing would have turn to them for help instead.

The Portuguese engaged the pirate fleet on January 3, 1810, January 4, and on the 21 the Portuguese inflicted a decisive defeat on the pirates, after which they retreated into a shallow inlet where Portuguese ships couldn't enter due to their larger draught, variously identified as Hiang-San or Lintim. Alcoforado had his ships positioned in a line across the bay, and the pirate fleet was finally cornered. On the 20th, 93 ships from the provincial fleet joined the Portuguese in their blockade, commanded by Sun Quanmou.

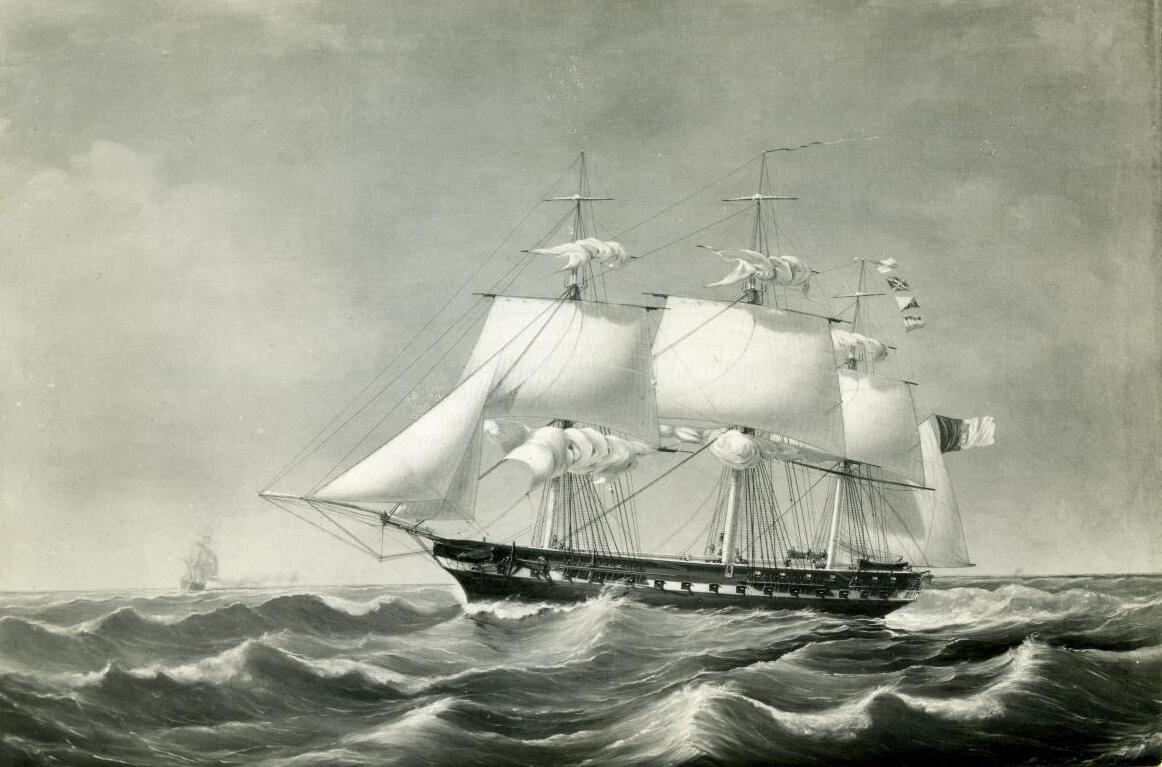
The 19th-century Portuguese frigate Dona Maria II

The pirates made various attempts to counterattack and break the blockade, but were unsuccessful. On the 23rd, the pirates managed to capture one ship from the provincial fleet, and killed the 74 men aboard. The situation turned into a stalemate between the pirates and the joint Sino-Portuguese fleet. Frustrated with the lack of progress, Sun Quanmou converted 43 of his ships into fireships and set them adrift towards the pirates in Tung Chung Bay on the 28th. The pirates diverted the fireships, towed them ashore, extinguished the fires, and broke them up for firewood. At this point the wind changed, and two of the fireships were blown back to the provincial fleet and ignited two of Sun's own ships. The provincial fleet lost 3 ships and at least 74 men, while the pirates lost 40 men and no ships.

=== Negotiations and surrender ===
After two weeks of blockade, on the 21st of February Cheung Po Tsai finally messaged Alcoforado agreeing to surrender, on the condition that Arriaga was present during the negotiations as a mediator and guarantor. The Macanese authorities informed the Viceroy of Guangzhou, who in turn forwarded the news to the Emperor.

Meanwhile, the blockade of the pirate fleet continued. Cheung Po Tsai expressed his desire to meet Alcoforado. Against the advice of his officers who suspected of a trap, the Portuguese commander ordered them to avenge him if it was and sailed a dinghy to meet Cheung Po Tsai aboard his flagship, amidst the entire pirate fleet. He was received at the sound of cymbals and a gun salute. Cheung Po Tsai was impressed with Alcoforados trust and confidence and as a gesture of appreciation he released the British and American prisoners in his custody. He agreed to surrender and even went as far as admitting that he was just attempting to buy time to break the blockade. After the meeting, Alcoforado returned to his fleet, where he was received with another gun salute and the sailors climbed to the masts to salute him.

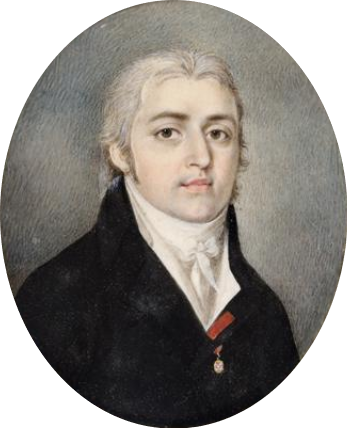
Miguel José d'Arriaga Brum da Silveira, who was instrumental as a mediator between the pirates and Qing authorities

The governor of Macau Lucas José de Alvarenga refused to host the pirate fleet and the signing of the surrender of Cheung Po Tsai in the city. Arriaga and the Qing emissaries were therefore forced to continue talks outside the city walls at Kun Iam Temple. They later met with Imperial delegates at Qianshan and while there they received news of Alcoforados daring act, which encouraged the Chinese to agree to all of Arriagas proposals, as did Arriagas high reputation. They decided to have Cheung Po Tsai anchor his fleet at Fu Iong Sa near Qianshan and surrender there.

Thus, on February 21, the pirates signed a peace treaty whereby they agreed to submit to the Chinese Emperor. At the meeting, Cheung Po Tsai demanded to be treated as a free man by the Qing since he had only been defeated by the Portuguese. In exchange, and by direct suggestion of Arriaga, Cheung Po Tsai was rehabilitated and granted the position of admiral under the service of the Emperor to fight other pirates. Thus, no party was prejudiced at the end of the negotiations. Nevertheless, Cheung Po Tsai agreed to hand over 14 of his collaborators for the most heinous atrocities, committed without his consent.

On April 14, governor Bai Ling proceeded to the agreed spot to receive the surrender of the last pirates. Cheung Po Tsai formally surrendered all of his fleet and weapons, which numbered about 280 ships, 2,000 guns and over 16,000 men, 5,000 women, 7000 swords and spears and 1200 cannon of various sizes, on 15 April 1810. Although the agreement entitled Portugal to half the confiscated goods, the Portuguese claimed naught, which once again greatly impressed the Chinese. The signing of the instrument of surrender was done five days later on the 20th and the process complete.

== After the surrender ==
In spite of the general amnesty, 14 of the worst pirates pointed out by Cheung Po Tsai were still beheaded and their heads displayed on pikes on the road between Macau and Qianshan, while 126 more were executed, 151 banished for life and 60 were exiled for two years.

In fulfilling their part of the deal with Portugal for their assistance, Chinese authorities ultimately kept none of their promises. The Portuguese were neither fully compensated for the expenses incurred in the outfitting of their fleet, nor were any old rights and privileges of Macau restored. Regarding the efforts of the Portuguese against the pirates, the East India Company wrote to the Admiralty that "From these patriotic exertions Macao derives many advantages, the Portuguese government glory, and all commercial Nations the freedom of the China seas. The Chinese do sincerelly congratulate themselves on the extenction of an enemy, who has for more than twenty years continued to oppress his fellow subjects, the Imperial Naval Forces being inadequate to check or destroy him".

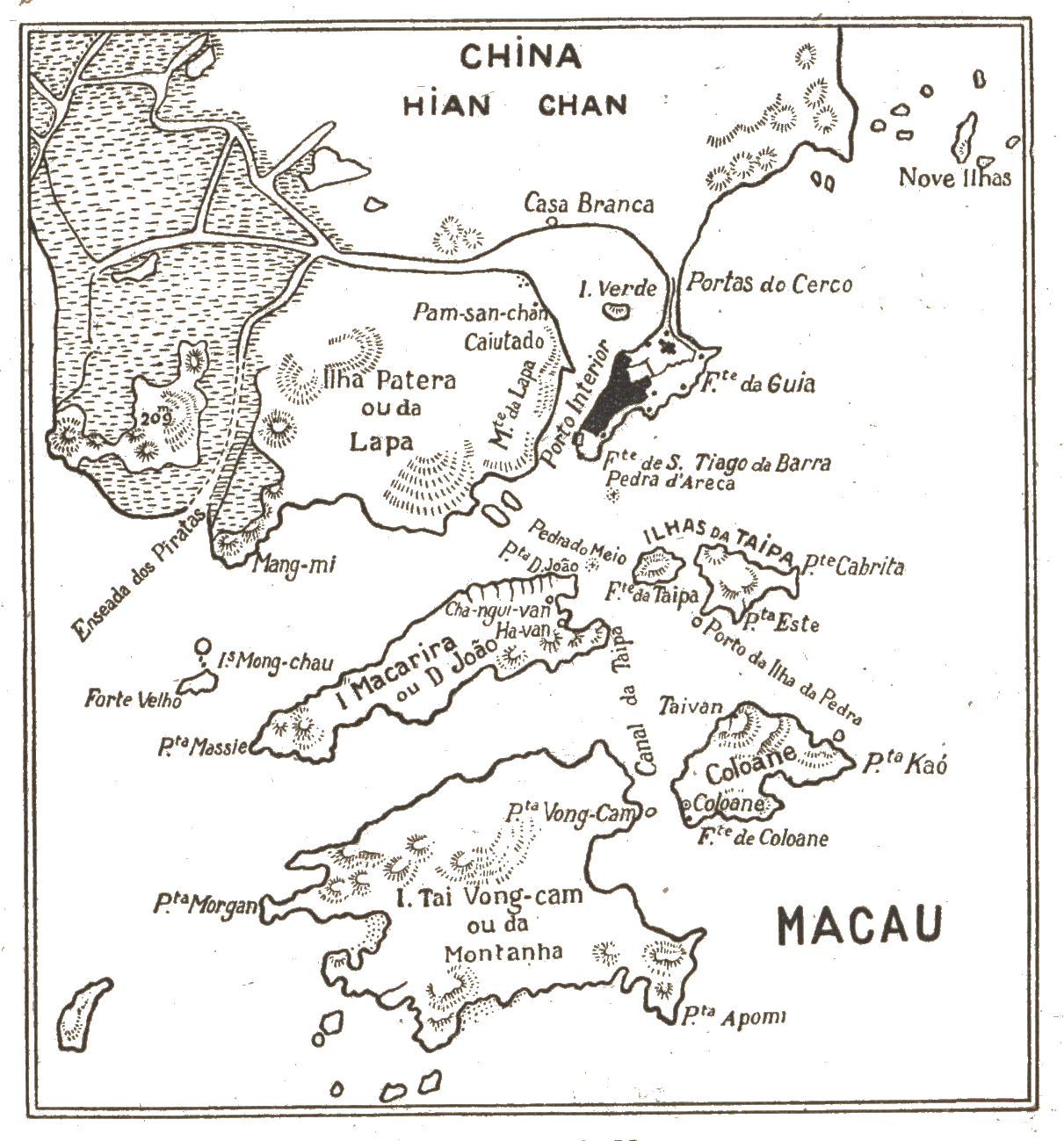
1936 map of Macau, with an inlet west of Lapa Island marked as "Pirates Cove"

Arriaga on his part was received triumphantly by the population of Macau. Alcoforado was in turn promoted to the post of governor of Timor as a reward for his outstanding conduct. Arriagas efforts were celebrated at Macau on the 3rd of June, 1810. Cheung Po Tsai would in the future make formal visits to Macau to meet several of the Portuguese officers present at the fighting.

Faced with more than 40,000 ex-pirates, their family members and released prisoners, governor Bai Ling was instructed to devise methods to resettle them, so they would not relapse into crime. They were first fed, then interrogated and finally dispersed across the province. Those with skills but no family were handed to local constables or village headmen to be returned to work. Fishermen and Tanka people were registered if they wished to return to their old trade. People with no skills or families were retained for state service as servants or cooks. Scattering and watching over the tens of thousands of pirates who had surrendered proved successful in preventing them from reforming, yet many fell to unemployment and homelessness and returned to crime as state policies failed to provide them with any adequate livelihoods. One Western observer remarked in 1834 that: "The ten thousands of poor wretches who were thus disbanded, were neither annihilated nor subdued, nor provided thereby with future support beyond their present ill gotten means: and though there has been no such confederacy of pirates subsequent to that event, yet their names and deeds and their wants continue; and frequent distresses have occasioned frequent piracies."

With the surrender of Guo Podai and Cheung Po Tsai, the most powerful pirates in the Pearl River Delta had been eliminated. Piracy along the southern coast of China reverted to petty activities of gangs of bandits or opportunistic fishermen or sailors. Cheung Po Tsai died of natural causes in 1822, while serving as colonel of the Penghu garrison. Zheng Yi Sao moved to Macau in 1824 but later relocated to Guangzhou, where she opened a gambling house. She died in 1844 aged 69.

== Modus operandi ==
The Confederation established numerous stronghold on offshore islands, within the Pearl River estuary, and on a string of islands by its mouth which Europeans dubbed Ilhas dos Ladrões (Portuguese for "Islands of Thieves") or Ladrones. The pirates established on base on Longxue or Dragon Cave island, less than thirty kilometers from Guangzhou. From their island stronholds, the pirates st up trade posts, ran extensive protection rackets and set up their families.

Though the Confederation had a great number of ships, the pirates preferred to attack in small groups or as single vessels. They attacked small, coastal and stationary targets at night, using nimble small craft powered by oars. They would conceal their ships behind islands and attack by ambush. Though harder to take, large trading junks were the most desirable prey as they carried rice, silver, dried fish, wine, betel nuts, oil, porcelain, tea, sugar, birds nests and other trade items. The confederation sold safe-conducts, controlled the salt and opium trades through the use of passports and charged tribute on villages and markets.

After ships, cargoes or prisoners were secured, the prize had to be reported to the confederation authorities and could be held for ransom. The ransom would be set according to the value of the cargo or the captives ability to pay but if payment was not forthcoming the victim would be executed. Even after ransom was delivered the pirates might keep their prize.

Pirate vessels ranged in size from 15 to 200 tons, with the majority averaging at between 70 and 150 tons. The largest pirate junks carried twelve six or eight-pounder guns, some of which manufactured in the West, manned by crews of 200 men.

Crews were drawn from empoverished and marginalized classes in Confucian society. They could be recruited by offers of money, boats, women or positions of leadership, though they could also be abducted and forced to participate. During times of famine parents might sell their children to pirates in desperation. Pirate ships contained large numbers of captives who might outnumber the actual pirate crews. They fulfilled a number of roles involuntarily, such as cleaning, cooking, and loading cargo. They might be tortured and abused into joining the crew. Captive men, women and children were also kept by the pirates for the purpose of sexual exploitation. Though forced, this made them punishable by Chinese law. Captives forced to serve as lookouts or to handle spoils might be punished with banishment and slavery to Manchuria, changed in 1802 to Xinjiang, while those forced to perform menial tasks would be punished with three years of penal servitude or being flogged with one hundred strokes of heavy bamboo, which also applied to victims of sexual abuse.

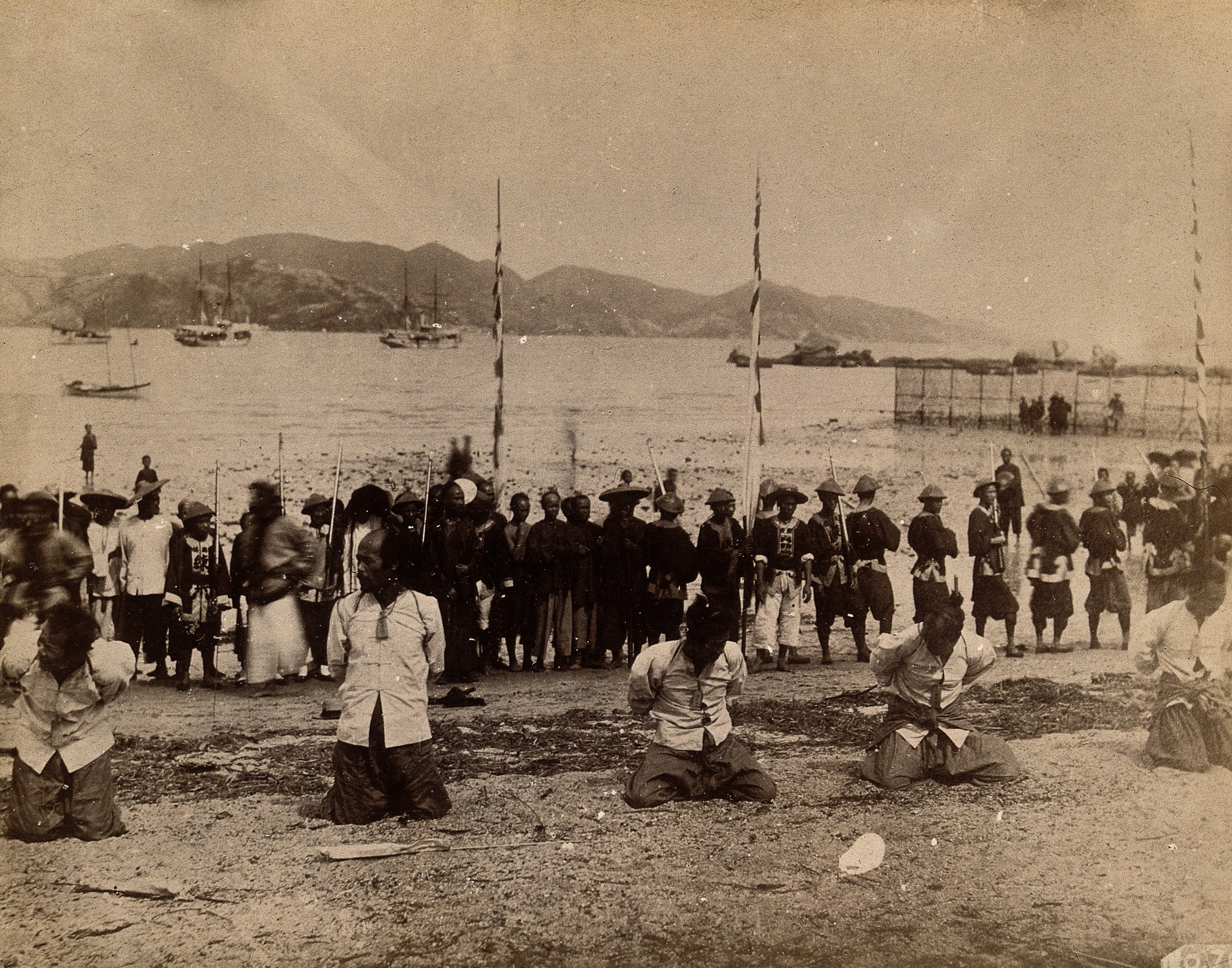
Pirates about to be executed by Qing officials in the late 19th century

The pirates gained a firm hold over coastal villages, towns, markets, fishing and shipping "through the systematic use of extortion, bribery and terror". Dramatic and deliberate displays of violence was often employed as a means to intimidate and enforce their power and authority. Thought their pirate code forbade it, rape against men and women was recurrent, while violence was employed to intimidate crews and coerce men to join them. Torture was recurrent, the most common form being to string their victims by their hands naked and beatem with canes. Resisting ship crews would suffer the worst treatment, which included dismemberment, disembowlment, and having their feet nailed ot the deck and beaten to death. Cannibalism such as drinking victims blood or eating their livers and hearts is also reported. In engaging in acts of extreme violence, the pirates imitated the same violence the state employed against them. Most pirates and especially repeat offenders could expect the death penalty, one of the most popular methods of execution employed by the Chinese state being death by slicing. Death by slicing was reserved for those involved in the killing of soldiers or officials, plundering of foreign merchant ships and the murder of three or more persons in one family. The normal execution method however, was decapitation. They were usually executed after trial in accordance to a special procedure known as "summary execution by royal mandate", which allowed certain high-ranking provincial officials to bypass normal judicial procedures, requiring the approval of the emperor, to speed up the execution of criminals.

== Laws ==
Zheng Yi Sao and Cheung Po Tsai imposed a pirate code that regulated the division of spoils, provided for the provisioning of ships that were unsuccessful in their raids and banned rape, though this was seldom enforced.

The leaders of the most important fleets agreed to a code of laws or "compacts" which defined gangs as cohesive, self-governing bodies, detailed the division of spoils and the enforcement of discipline. One written compact signed by seven leaders in 1805 consisted of eight regulations designed to keep harmony among the various gangs and was mutually binding on all. Another compact promulgated in 1807 stipulated procedures for settling disputes, for the equitable division of spoils through a "common chest" and sought to protect women from sexual abuse.

== See also ==
- Pirates of the South China Coast

== Bibliography ==
- Andrade, José Ignácio de (1835). Memórias dos Feitos Macaenses Contra os Piratas da China e da Entrada Violenta dos Inglezes na Cidade de Macao. Lisbon: Typografia Lisbonense.
