= Blake Pier =

Blake Pier may refer to the following.

- Blake Pier, Central: a demolished ferry pier in Central, Hong Kong.
- Blake Pier at Stanley: an existing ferry pier in Stanley, Hong Kong.
