= Morse Park =

Urban park in Kowloon, Hong Kong

Coordinates: 22.3384°N 114.1910°E

- 摩士公園
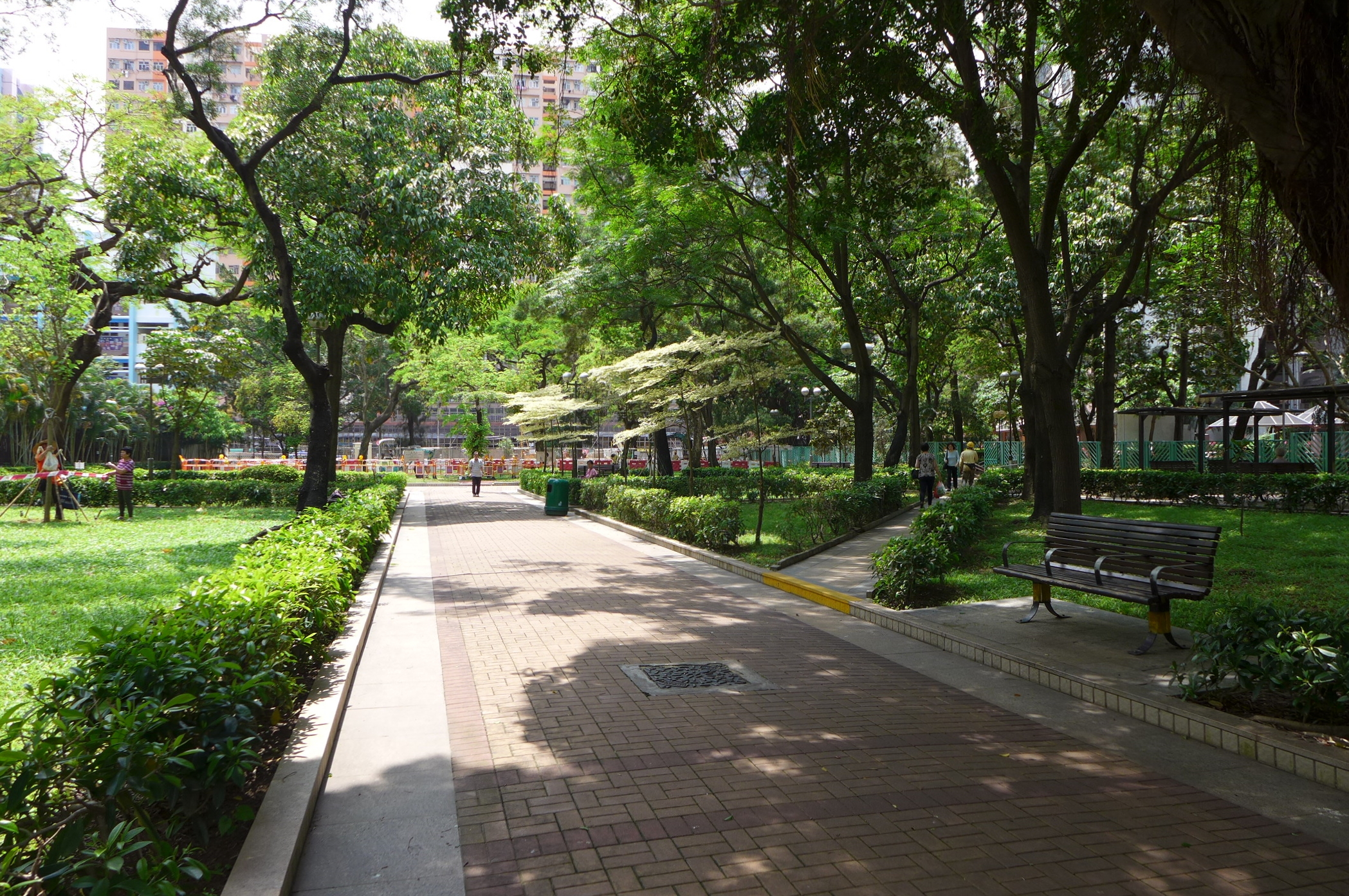
- Morse Park No. 1
- Interactive map of Morse Park
- Location: Wong Tai Sin, Kowloon
- Area: 15.8 hectares (39 acres)
- Opened: 6 October 1967; 58 years ago
- Operator: Leisure and Cultural Services Department
- Open: Year round
- Public transit: Lok Fu station Wong Tai Sin station

Morse Park (Chinese: 摩士公園), occupying 15.8 hectares (39 acres), is an urban park located in Wong Tai Sin in Kowloon. It was completed in 1967. The park was named after Sir Arthur Morse (25 April 1892 – 13 May 1967), the head of The Hong Kong and Shanghai Banking Corporation during and after World War II.

City streets divide the park into four sections formally called Morse Park No. 1, Morse Park No. 2, and so on.

== History ==
The Hong Kong Golden Jubilee Jamborette (香港金禧大露營), was held between 27 December 1961 and 2 January 1962, celebrating the Golden jubilee (50 year anniversary) of Hong Kong Scouting with theme One World (天下一家). At Kowloon Tsai, now named Morse Park, the Jamboree hosted 2,732 Scouts in the challenging winter with heavy rain.

The park site was a former rifle range. The park was previously known as Takwuling Park before it opened. The first phase of Morse Park was opened on 6 October 1967 by G.M. Tingle, the Director of Urban Services.

The Morse Park Swimming Pool opened in 1970. It was the largest swimming complex in the territory when it first opened, although the similarly sized pools in Kwun Tong and Lei Cheng Uk opened soon after. Governor Murray MacLehose brought Queen Elizabeth II here in May 1975, using the complex as an exemplar of his government's "commitment to recreation and sport".

In 1996, the landscaping of the park was awarded the Award of Merit of the Green Project.

== Blake Pier Pavilion ==
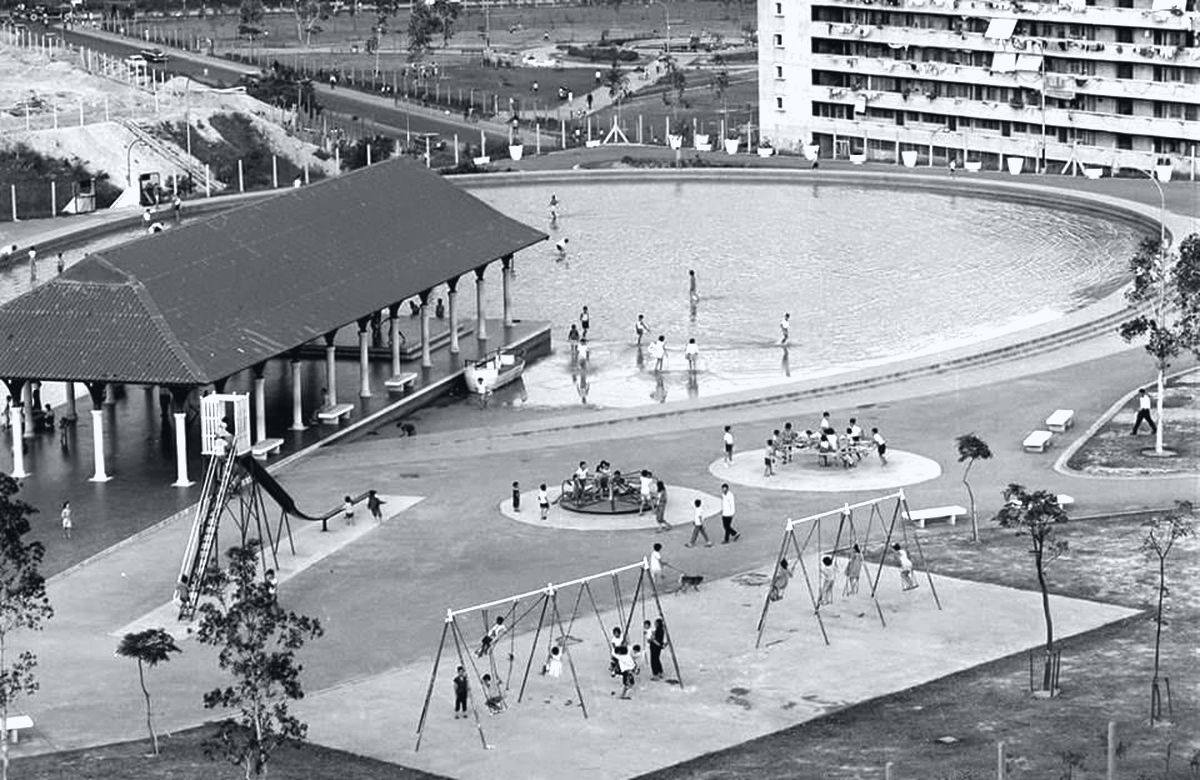
Top structure of the First generation Blake Pier at Morse Park in the 1960s.

The pavilion of the Blake Pier was later transferred to the open-air oval theatre in Morse Park. In 2006, the pavilion was once again transferred to the new Stanley Pier next to Murray House.

== Facilities ==
=== Tropical Palm Garden ===
More than 80 trees of 23 palm species are grown on the 2,000 square metres (22,000 sq ft) lawn of the Park's tropical palm garden, the only one in the city.

=== Arboretum ===
More than 100 trees of 30 rare species are grown on a 2,700 square metres (29,000 sq ft) lawn in the Arboretum of the Park.

== Gallery ==
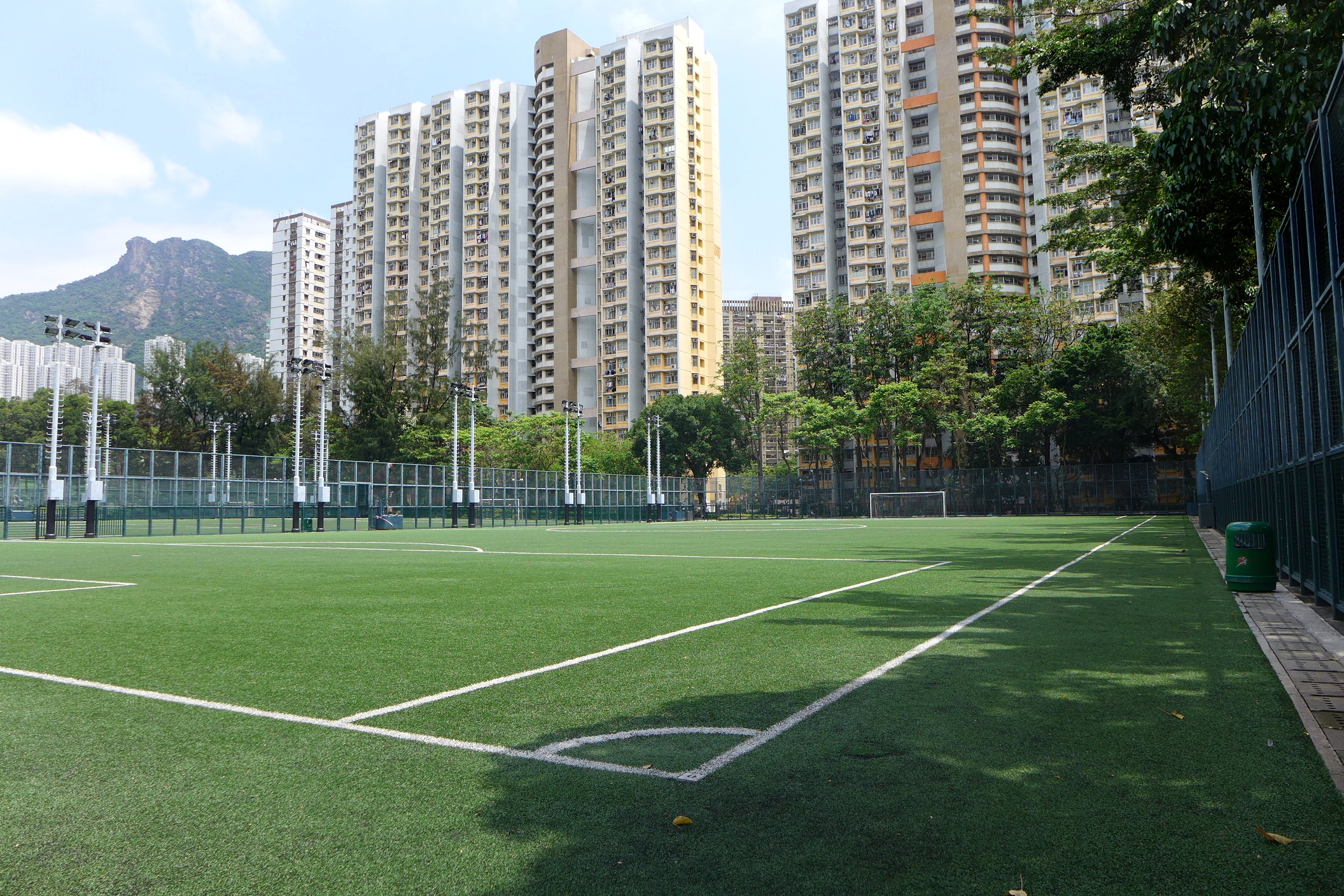
Football field

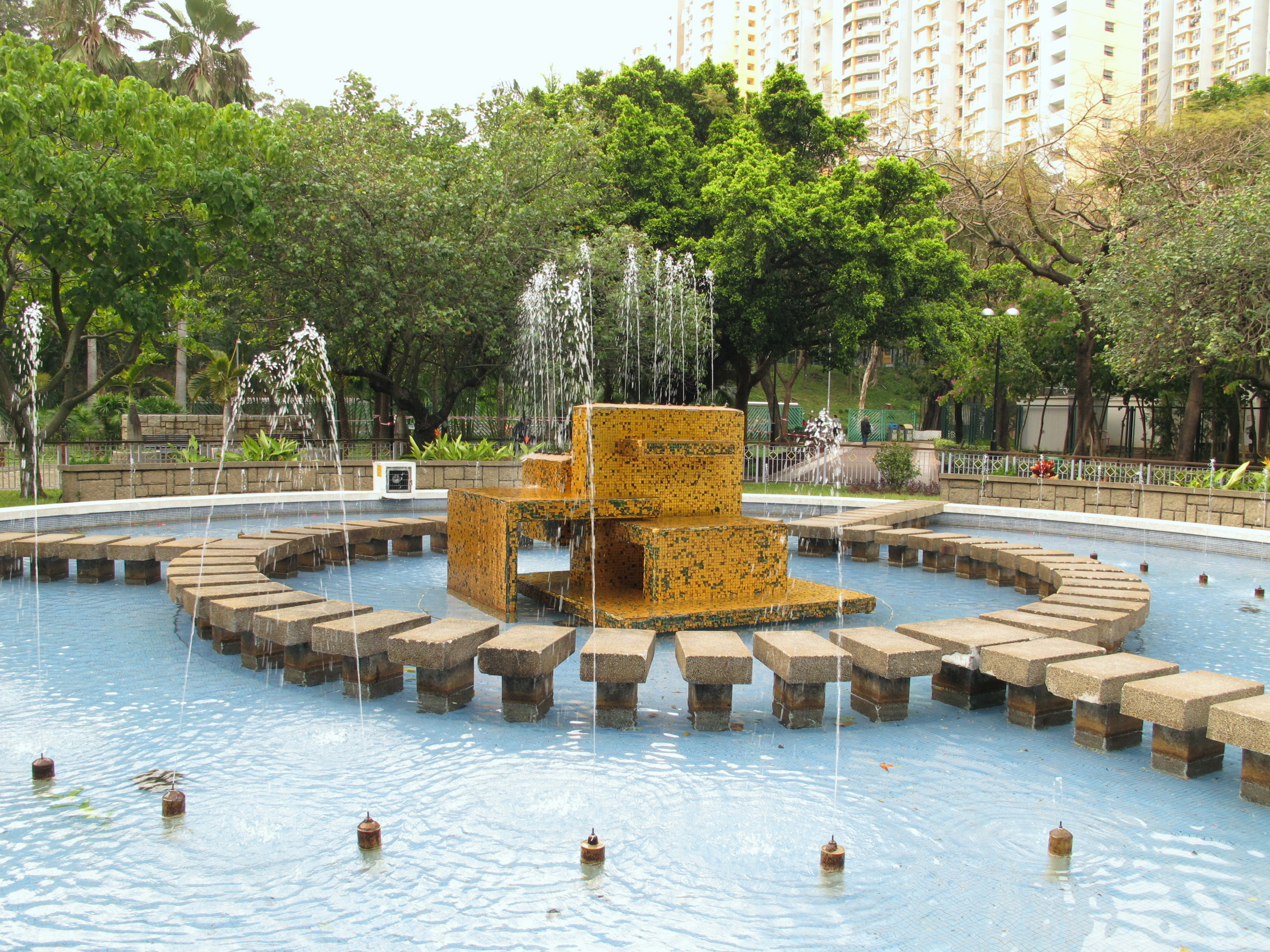
Old style fountain inside Morse Park, however it doesn't work in recent years

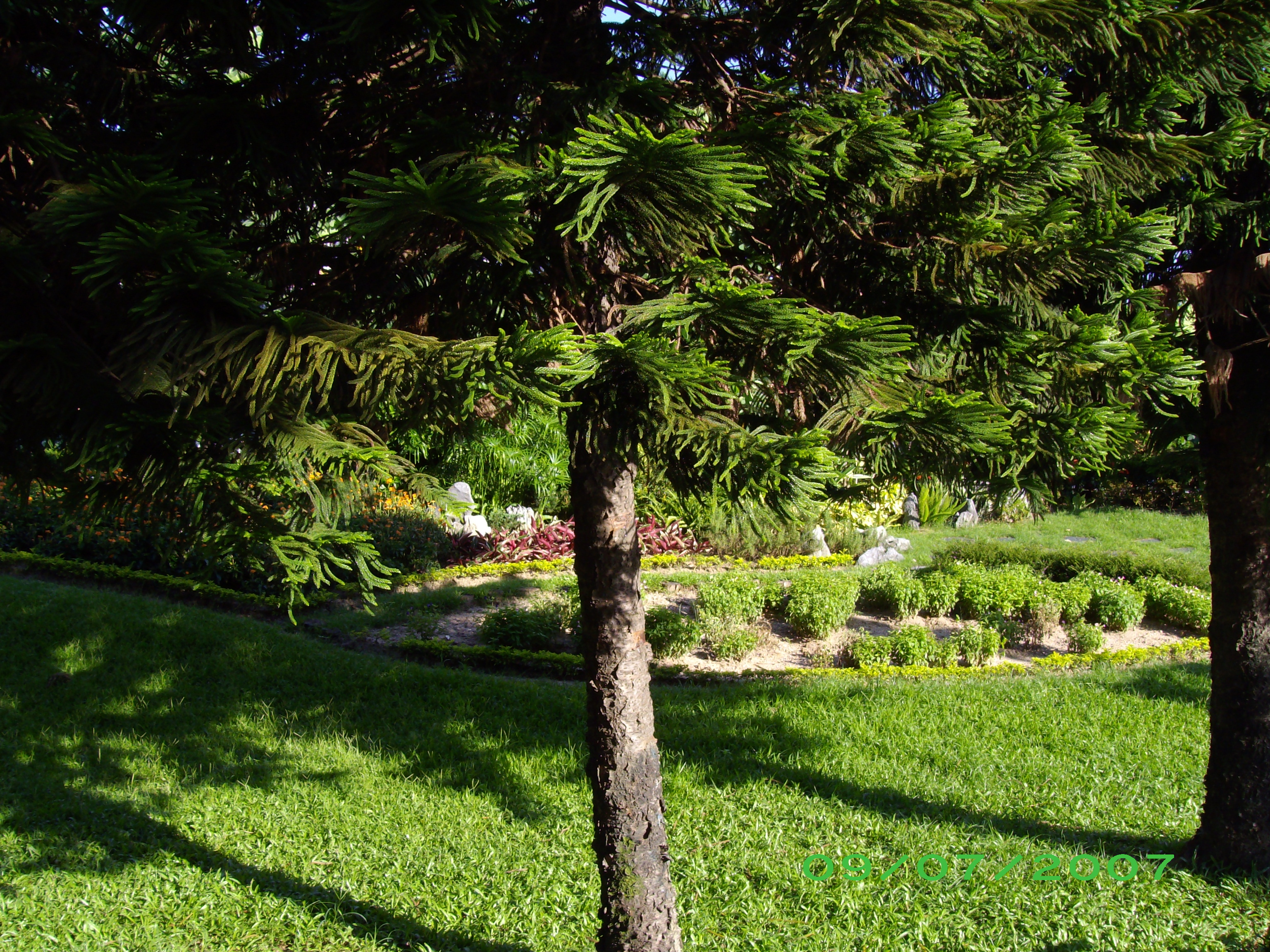
Butterfly corner

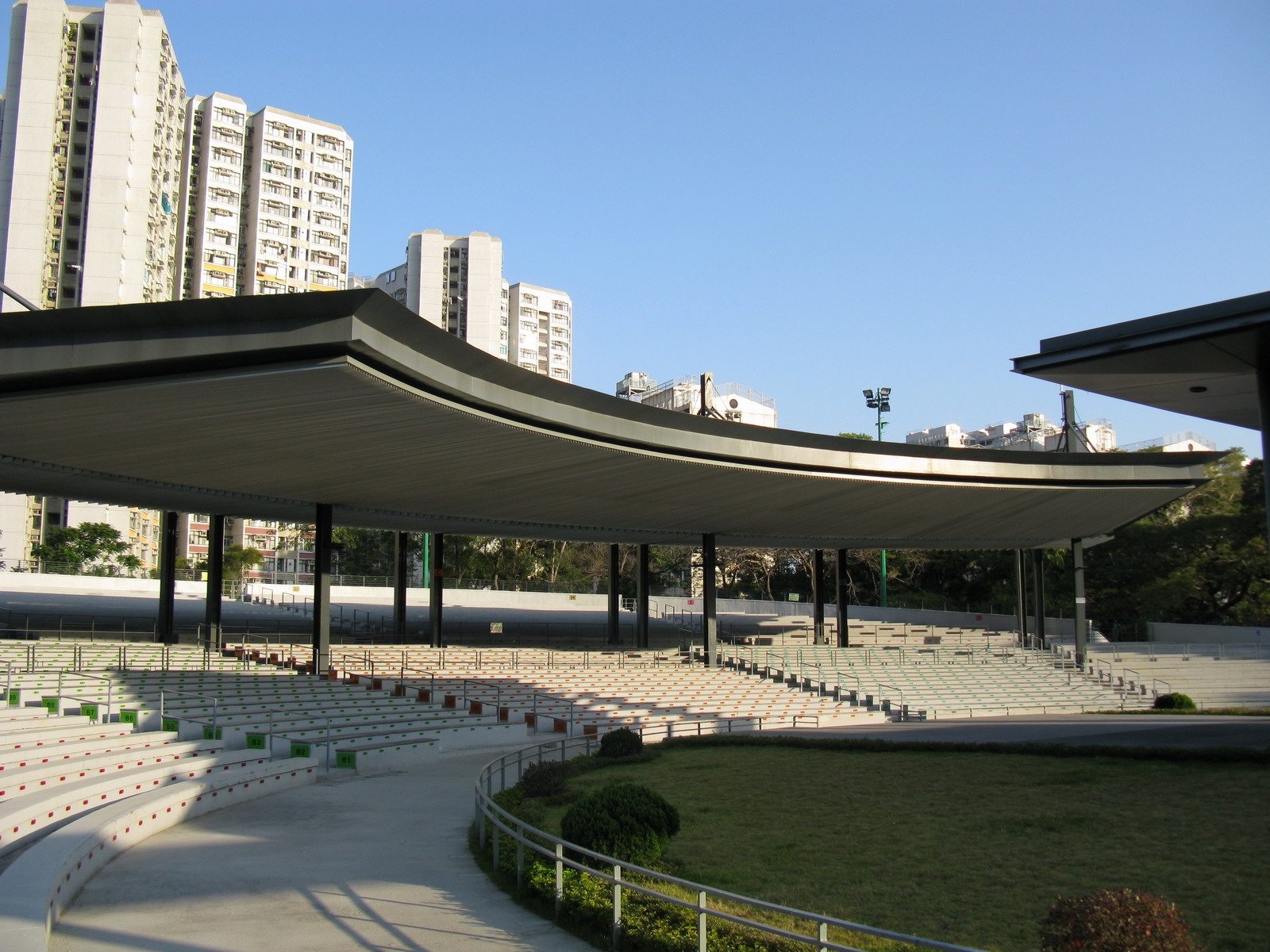
Amphitheatre

== See also ==
- List of urban public parks and gardens in Hong Kong
