= Blake Pier, Central =

Ferry pier in Central, Hong Kong

Coordinates: 22.2826°N 114.1583°E

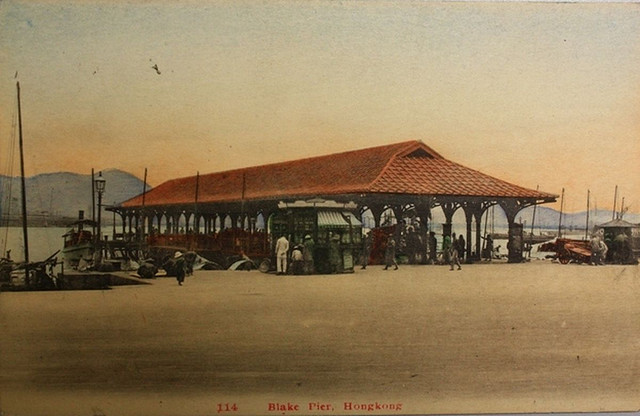
- Picture post card of Blake Pier in the 1920s
- Chinese: 卜公碼頭
Transcriptions

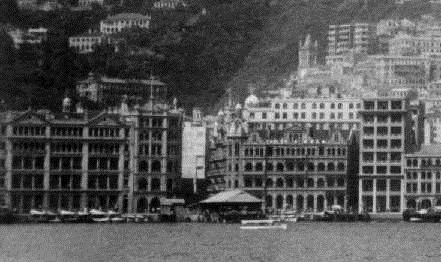
View from Victoria Harbour in the 1920s. Blake Pier is visible in the centre, at the end of Pedder Street.

The Blake Pier was a ferry pier in Central, Hong Kong. It was named after Sir Henry Arthur Blake, the twelfth governor of Hong Kong.

== History ==
=== First generation ===
The first generation of the pier was built in 1900 the end of Pedder Street for serving dignitaries and colonial governors. It had no cover originally. But, in 1909, an Edwardian-style, structural steel pavilion was built on top, providing travellers with shelter. It was demolished in 1965, but the pavilion was preserved, dismantled and rebuilt in Morse Park in Wong Tai Sin, Kowloon as a park shelter. In 2006, the pavilion was again dismantled, restored to its original condition. The renovated structure was relocated to Stanley, where it stands next to Murray House, which was similarly relocated brick by brick.

=== Second generation ===
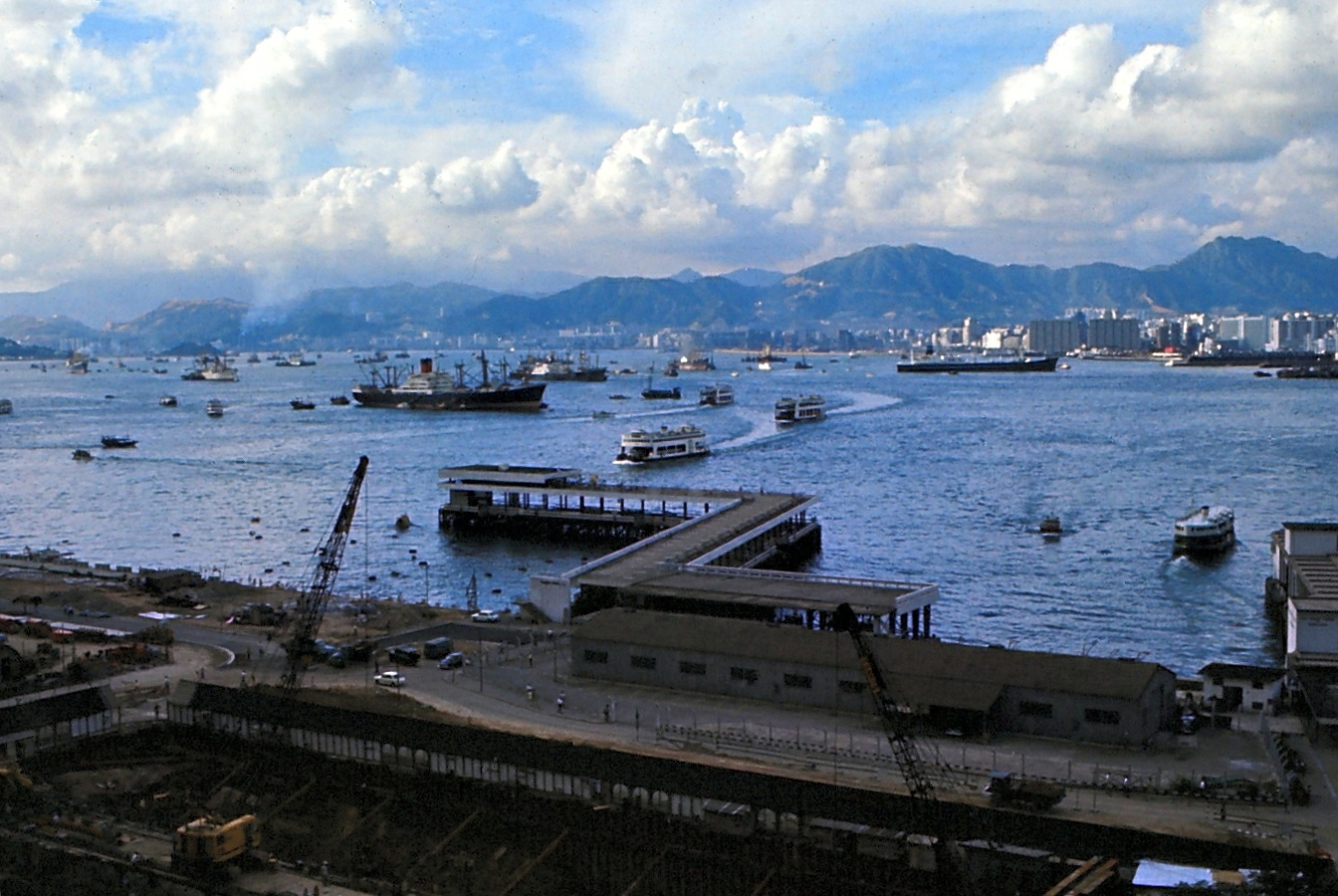
2nd generation Blake Pier in Central in 1971

The second generation of the pier was built in 1960s. It was demolished in 1993 to cope with the Central Reclamation Phase 1 project.

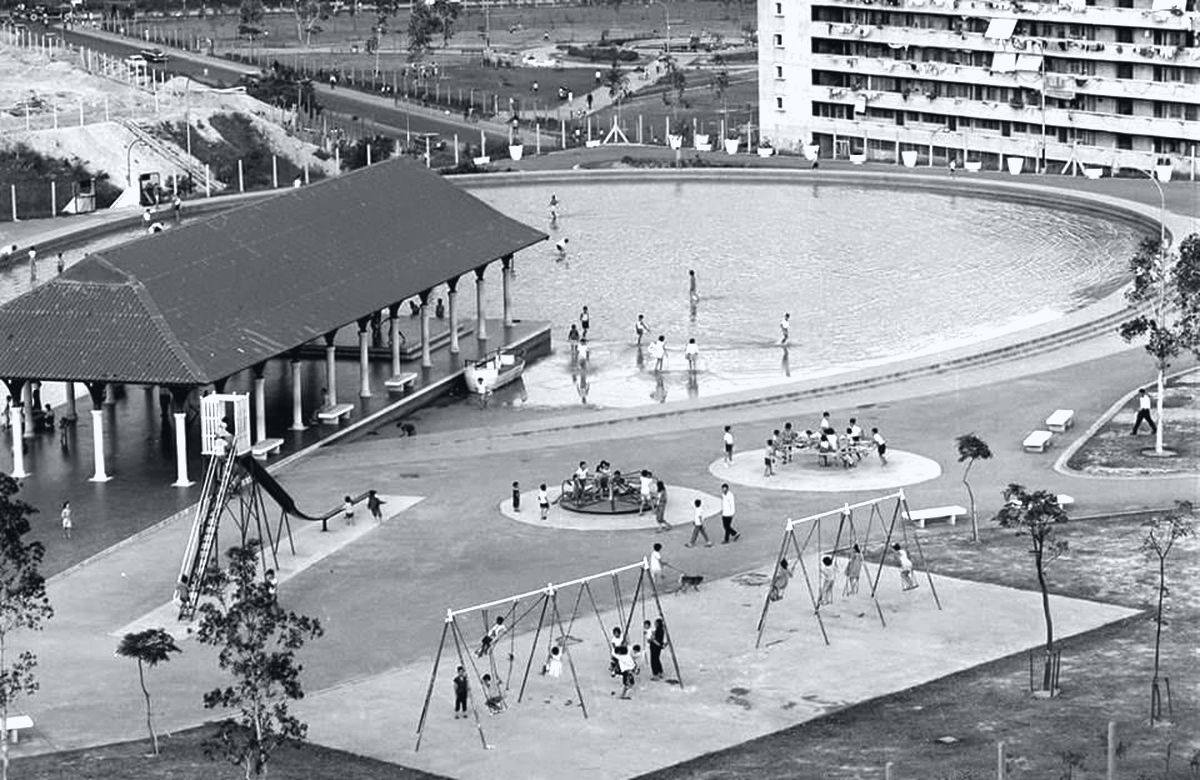
The top structure of the First generation pier at Morse Park in the 1960s.

=== Blake Pier at Stanley ===
The top structure of the First generation pier was transferred to the open-air oval theatre in Morse Park, in between Wong Tai Sin and Lok Fu, Kowloon. In 2006, the structure was once again transferred to Blake Pier at Stanley, next to the Murray House in Stanley, itself dismantled brick by brick and relocated from Central. The pier was recommissioned in Stanley on 31 July 2007.

== See also ==
- List of demolished piers in Hong Kong
