= Hong Kong Maritime Museum =

Museum in Hong Kong

- 香港海事博物館
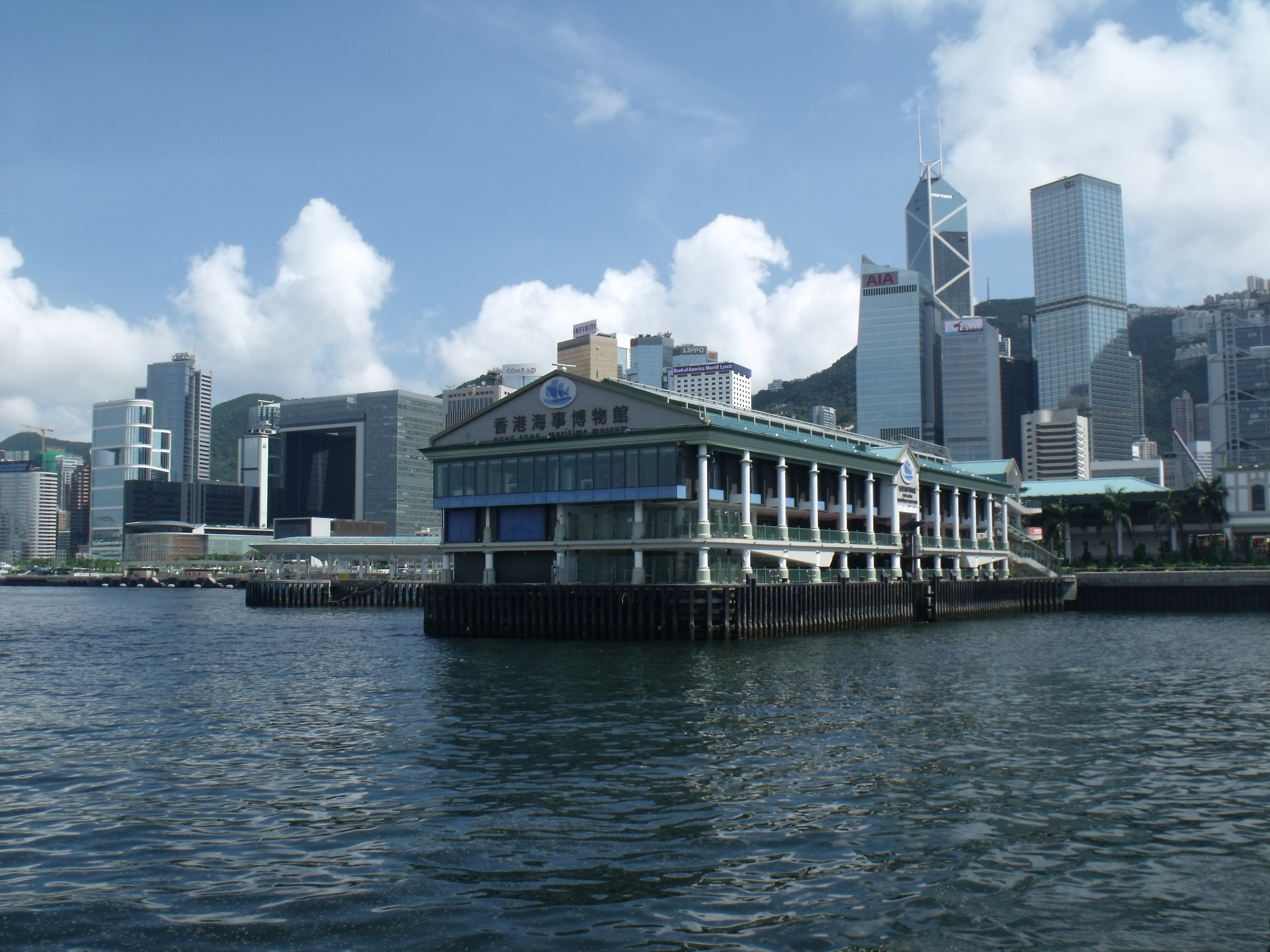
- Hong Kong Maritime Museum at Central Ferry Pier 8
- Established: 8 September 2005; 21 years ago
- Location: Central Pier 8, Hong Kong
- Coordinates: 22°17′11″N 114°09′43″E
- Type: Not-for-profit
- Website: hkmaritimemuseum.org

Chinese name
- Traditional Chinese: 香港海事博物館
Transcriptions
Yue: Cantonese
- Yale Romanization: Hēung góng hói sih bok maht gún
- Jyutping: Hoeng1 gong2 hoi2 si6 bok3 mat6 gun2

Hong Kong Maritime Museum is a non-profit educational institution funded by the international shipping community and the government in Hong Kong. It is located at Central Pier 8, Hong Kong. The museum was established on 8 September 2005 and reopened to the public in February 2013.

The museum focuses on the development of boats, ships, maritime exploration and trade, and naval warfare. While concentrating on the South China coast and its adjacent seas, its exhibits also cover global trends and provide an account of Hong Kong's maritime growth.

The museum includes semi-permanent and special exhibitions, interactive displays, educational events, a café, and a museum shop.

== Initial Murray House location ==
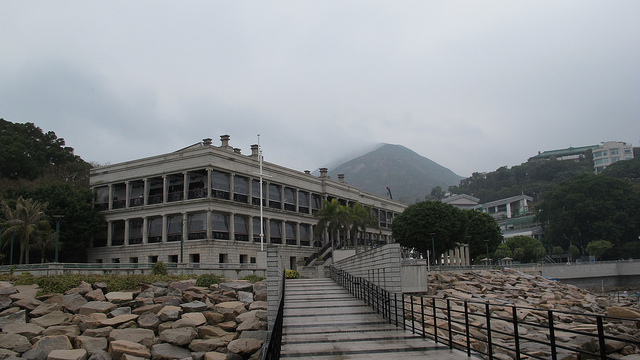
Murray House at Stanley Beach, Hong Kong

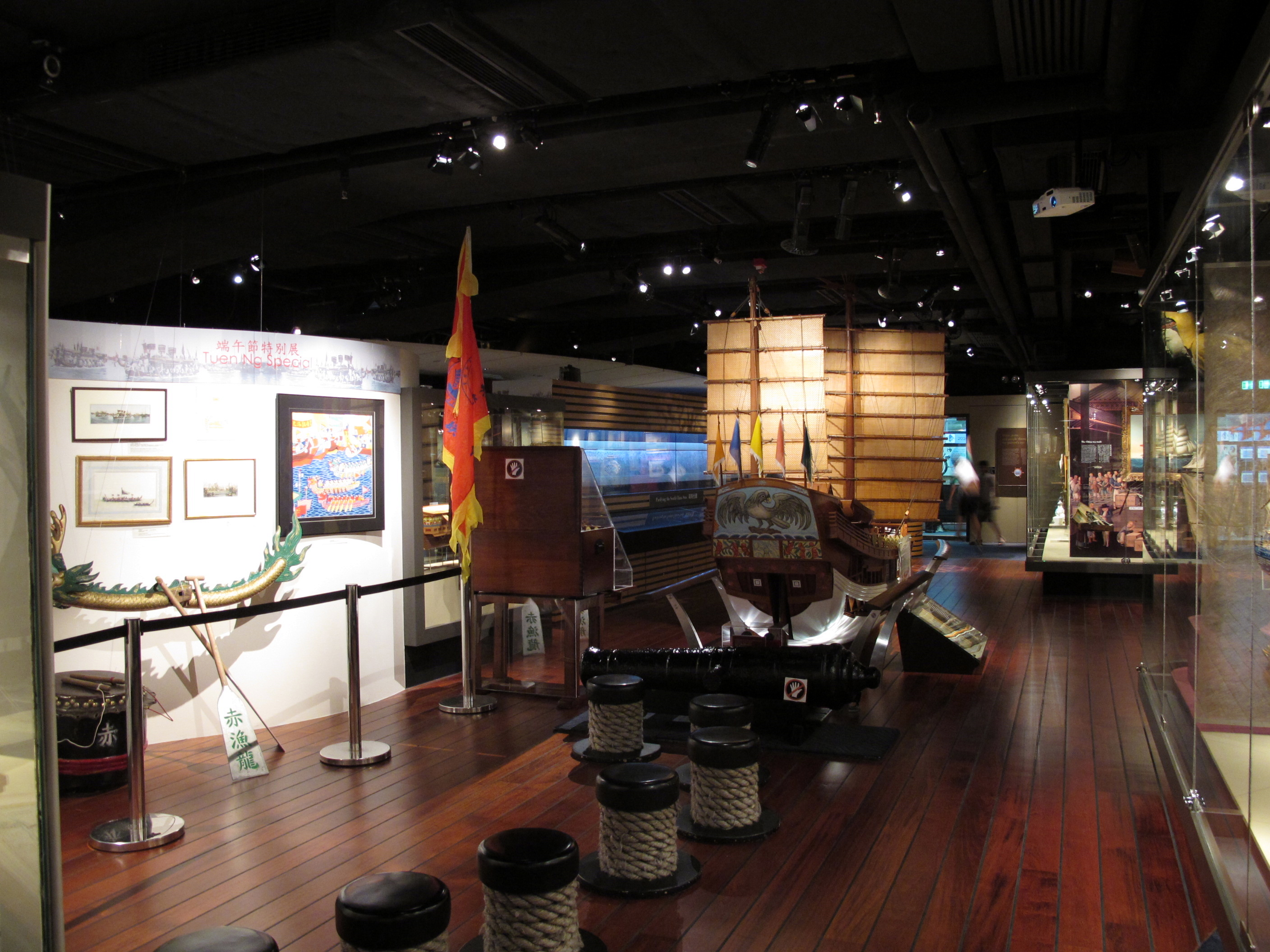
Museum interior at Murray House

The museum first opened to the public on 8 September 2005, under the leadership of its first museum director, Stephen Davies, as well as its board of directors and the trustees of the Hong Kong Maritime Museum Trust. It was located on the ground floor of Murray House, a reconstruction of one of the first 19th-century buildings of the British colonial period. The building had been dismantled stone by stone and stored in a rural site for over a decade; it was reassembled around a modern reinforced concrete building overlooking Stanley Bay.

The Murray House Museum was divided into an ancient gallery and a modern gallery. Its exhibits included more than 500 items, including models of ancient and modern ships, paintings, ceramics, trade goods, and shipping documents. One of the museum's highlights was a 2,000-year-old ceramic model ship dating back to the Han dynasty. Another well-received exhibit was the 19th-century ink-painted scroll, Pacifying the South China Sea, which chronicled the naval activities of Bailing, Viceroy of the Two Guangs. These naval activities were a series of anti-piracy measures along the coast of Guangdong in 1809–1810, including the Battle of Lantau, in which the Chinese imperial navy battled Hong Kong's most famous pirate, Cheung Po Tsai.

The ancient gallery portrayed the flourishing of Chinese shipping in antiquity and during dynastic times. Many of the exhibits illustrated how China's overseas neighbours and Western trading nations together shaped the maritime history of Asia and the regions beyond. By contrast, the modern gallery explored the historical factors and the Chinese entrepreneurship that contributed to the flourishing maritime industry in Hong Kong. These exhibits covered developments in ship design as well as the various specialisations that have changed the face of the world's shipping industry and to which Hong Kong's port has had to adapt.

Between 2005 and 2011, the museum attracted an average of 35,000 visitors per year.However, because of the eventual expiration of its lease, as well as the Murray House's limited space and relatively remote location, administrators decided to either close the museum or find an alternate location. A long period of negotiations between the museum and the Government of the Hong Kong SAR began in September 2007, and, in his Policy Address in October 2009, the Chief Executive of Hong Kong endorsed the museum's relocation to Central Pier 8. This new location would serve a greater number of attendees as well as house a larger collection, which had almost tripled in size during the museum's first five years.

== Central Pier 8 ==
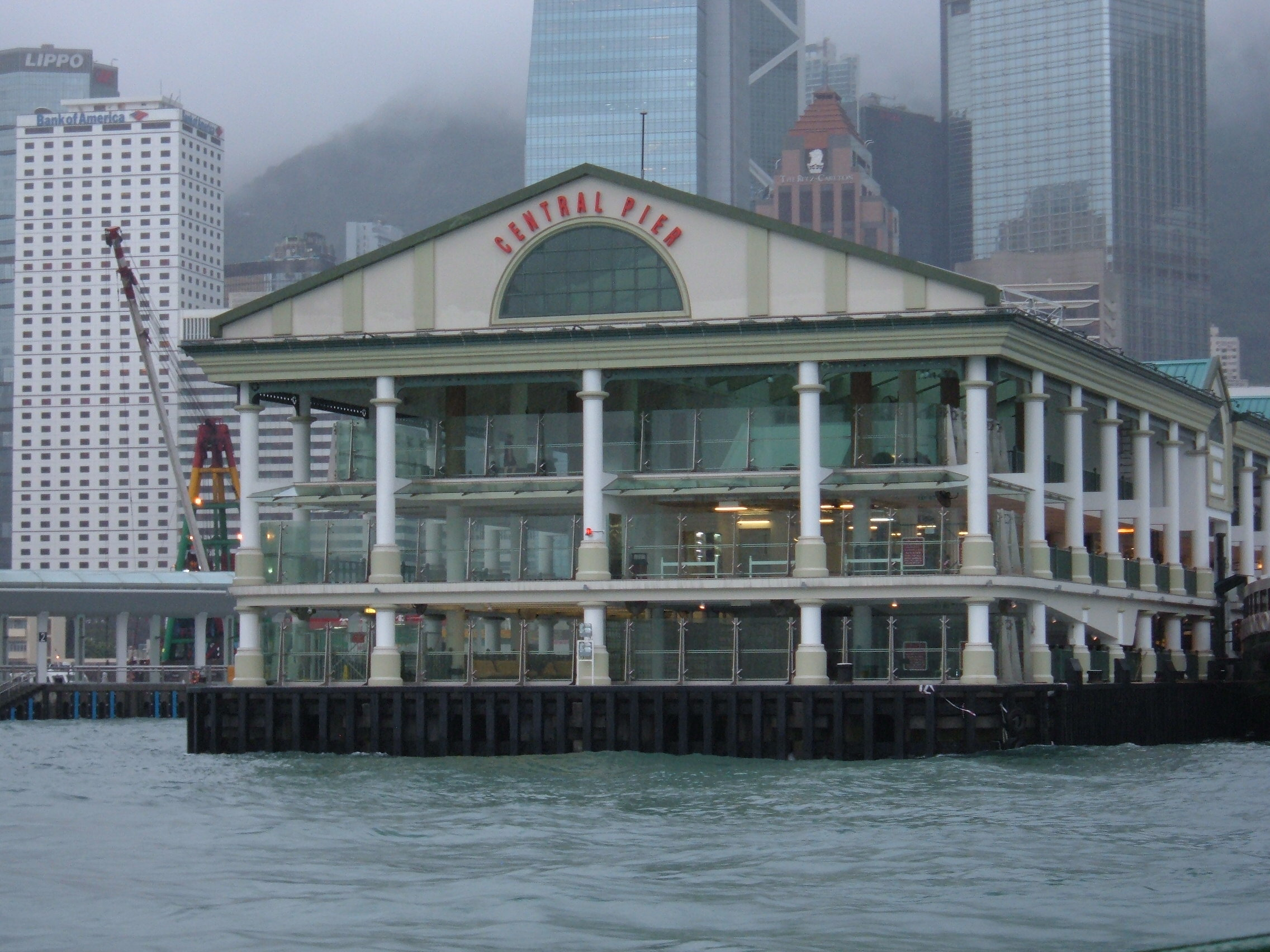
Pier 8 in 2007, as one of the terminals of the Star Ferry

In 2012, the Hong Kong Maritime Museum moved to a renovated location at Central Pier 8. This location had previously been used as terminal by the company Star Ferry for its service to Hung Hom; the eastern side of the pier had also been used for non-scheduled ferry services. However, this usage of the location had been discontinued, and as of August 2007, the pier had been designated for use by restaurants and kiosks.

In October 2007, the proposal was submitted to convert the unused pier into a museum, and this was accepted by the government. During the following three years, there were significant back-and-forth discussions between the museum and the government of Hong Kong in which the design proposals of museum director Stephen Davies and the original Murray House architects Richards Basmajian were refined. The final design of the museum premises was created by P&T Architects and Engineers, who were appointed as the main consultants for the project. Haley Sharpe Designs and Kingsmen undertook the gallery and interior fit-out.

The renovation project represented a partnership with the government of Hong Kong and members of Hong Kong's maritime community. The move allowed the museum to expand to fifteen gallery spaces with an additional two galleries for special exhibitions and for hosting special events. The new location was also included a café.

The South China Morning Post reported that the Hong Kong government partly financed the HK$115 million renovation project. Richard Wesley, the Hong Kong Maritime Museum's second director, said at the opening ceremony that the project:

"...marks the culmination of an enormous amount of work by board members and trustees of the HK Maritime Museum to create a truly high-class maritime museum in the Central waterfront. We are very grateful to the many shipping companies who have backed the museum financially since its birth in 2005, and of course the government."

Since the museum's opening in 2005, the exhibit collection has increased from around 700 items to over 2,000, and the library collection has increased from 15 books to over 1,500.

The display space at Pier 8 is more than five times larger than that of the Hong Kong Maritime Museum's first location. The new location was predicted to receive around 140,000 visitors a year. However, the site's location on the outskirts of the Hong Kong Central business district, where establishments are largely closed at the weekend, has proved to have a negative effect on visitor numbers. Nonetheless, the museum has attracted many visitors, and the new café, Café 8, has become the home of Hong Kong's Café Scientifique.

== Galleries of Pier 8 ==
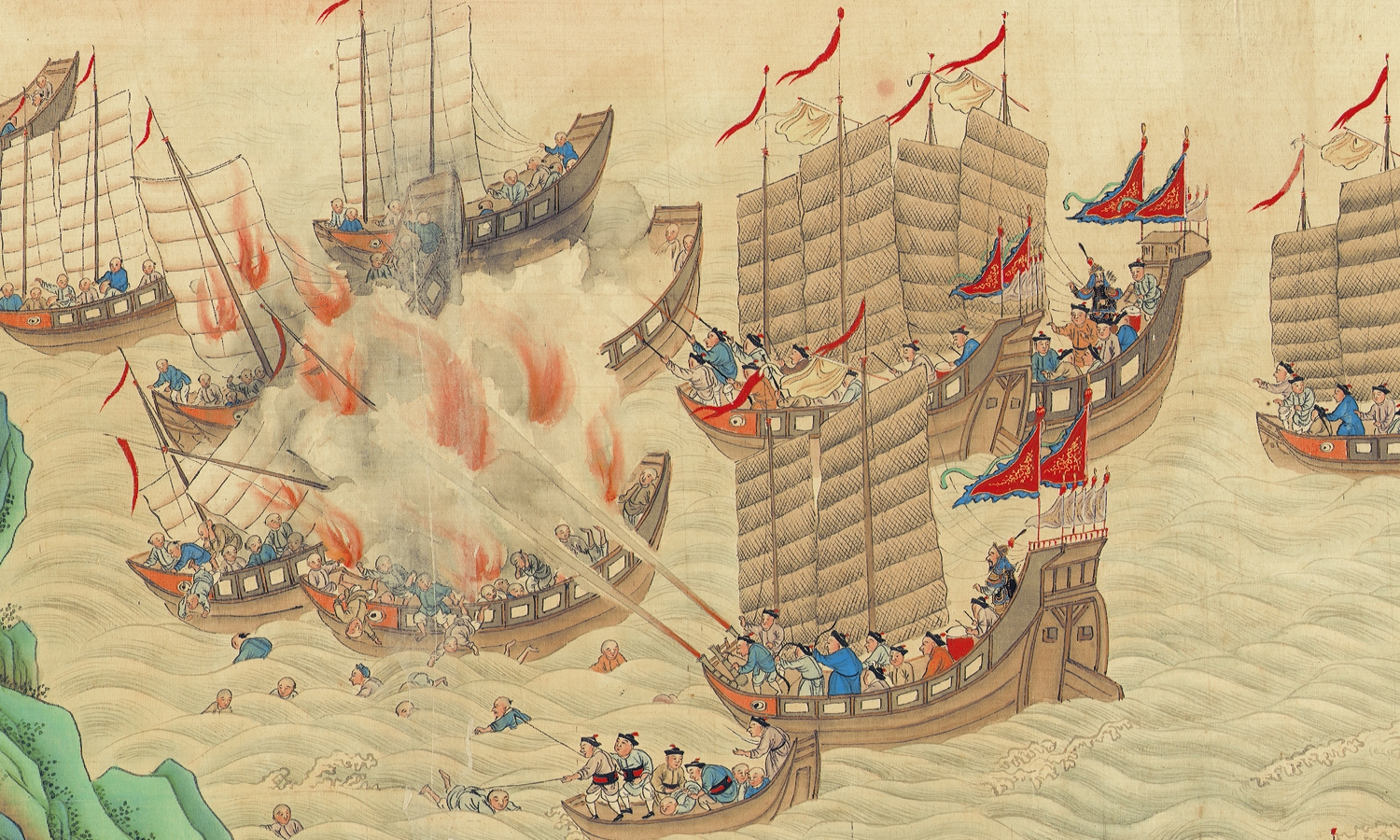
Portion of the Qing scroll that depicts piracy in China

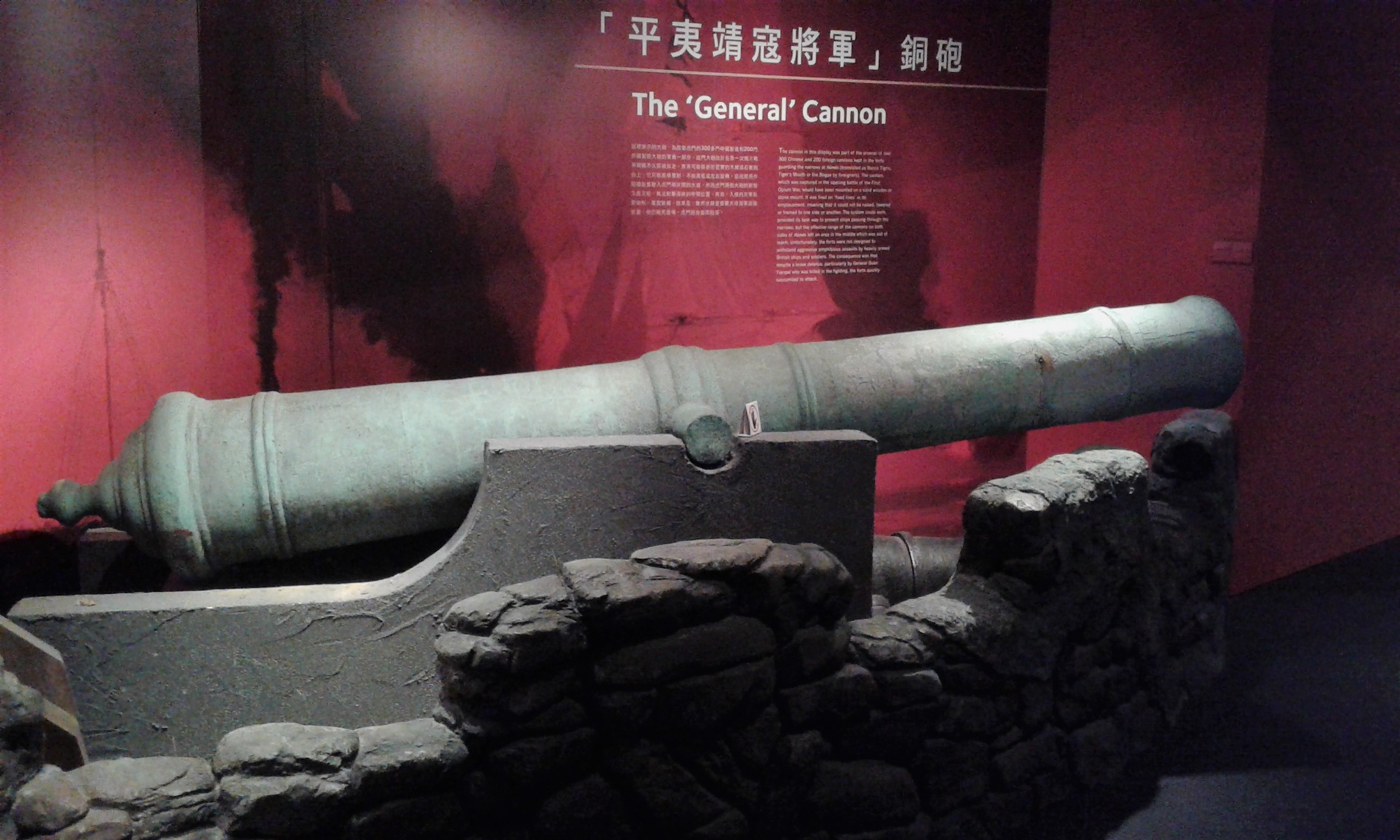
The 'General' Cannon in Hong Kong Maritime Museum at Central Ferry Pier 8

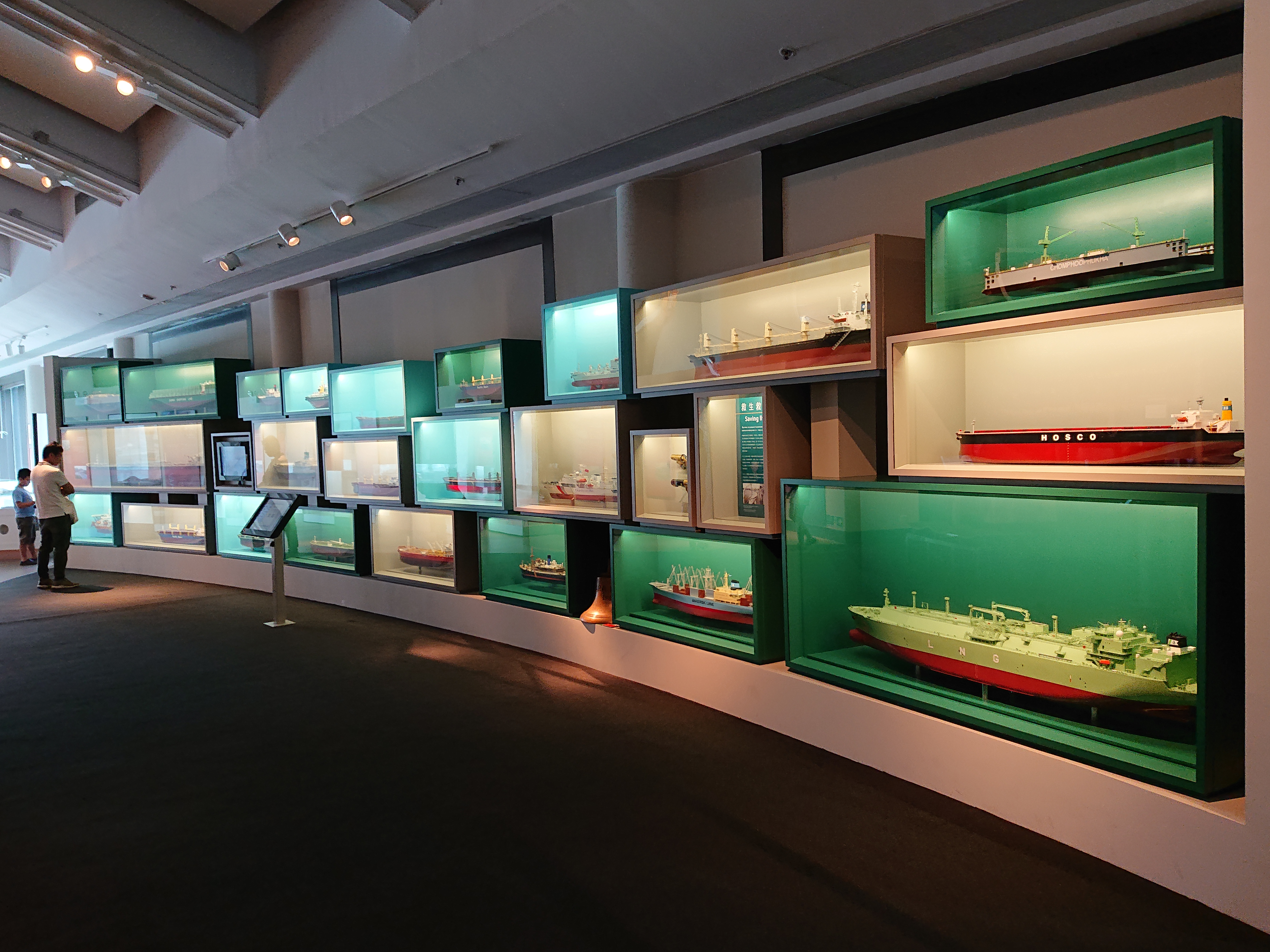
Cargo ship models in Hong Kong Maritime Museum at Central Ferry Pier 8

The galleries have exhibits on subjects such as China's maritime heritage, the Canton Trade, the Pirate Coast, Hong Kong's harbour, the evolution of China's modern maritime industry, relations with foreign seafaring powers, recreational uses of the water, the underwater world, the sounds of the sea, the modern shipping industry, the development of the port of Hong Kong, maritime safety, and Chinese marine art, as well as maritime communications, charting, navigation, and pilotage. Many of the exhibits were created with the help of individuals and corporations in the local Hong Kong maritime industry who supported and prioritized the preservation of Hong Kong's maritime history.

The exhibits contain many portraits and models of ships, both historic and modern. Many of these model ships are high-detail and are displayed in illuminated cases.

The Pier 8 location continues to display the painted scroll which was well received at the former Murray House location, and this exhibit is considered one of the museum's highlights. The scroll, which commemorates the defeat of a group of pirates who operated in the area around Guangdong in the mid-Jiaqing period (1796–1820), is prominently displayed in the new Sea Bandits Gallery. The museum also contains a digitalized version of the scroll which visitors can examine in minute detail.

Other highlights at the museum include four artworks that were painted in Macau in the late 18th century, called the 'Gentiloni Paintings'. The paintings depict Macau, Whampoa (Huangpu), Guangzhou, and Zhaoqing. These paintings had been transported to Rio de Janeiro in 1810 after they had been bought by or given to the lay secretary of the Papal Legate to the Portuguese Imperial court. They had remained in that family in Brazil until 2010, when they were purchased and returned to Hong Kong with a donation from Fairmont Shipping.

The museum's Sea Bandits Gallery contains an exhibit of a large naval artillery piece, the 'General' Cannon. This weapon was captured in 1841 at Humen during the earliest engagement of the First Opium War. The cannon had originally been taken back to Britain where it was kept in the Tower of London and later as a garden ornament; however, it was purchased by the museum in 2010 using a donation from Kenneth K.W. Lo.

The museum also contains an exhibit known as the 'Rifleman's Bolt." This exhibit contains a copper spike accompanied by a commemoratory granite plaque, with an inscription describing the surveying activities of the surveying vessel HM Rifleman in 1866 in Hong Kong harbour; according to the inscription, the copper bolt was used to mark a point 17 feet and 10 inches above the level of the surroundings during the surveying. This exhibit was donated by the Surveying and Mapping Office Training School of the Hong Kong Lands Department.

The museum notably contains the first modern map of the island of Hong Kong, which was not identified as being such until museum staff helped do so in 2007. It also includes one of the earliest modern marine chronometers. In addition to its many historic exhibits, the museum also has on display the windsurfing sailboard used by Hong Kong's Hayley Chan Hei Man (陳晞文) at the 2012 Olympic Games.

The galleries contain over 25 modern interactive screens to assist visitors; these interfaces contain a variety of media related to maritime history in Hong Kong and around the world.

== See also ==
- List of museums in Hong Kong
- Port of Hong Kong
- Intermodal container
- Ship model
- Tung Chao-yung
- Yue-Kong Pao
