= Blake Pier at Stanley =

Pier in Hong Kong

Coordinates: 22°13′2.4″N 114°12′36.33″E

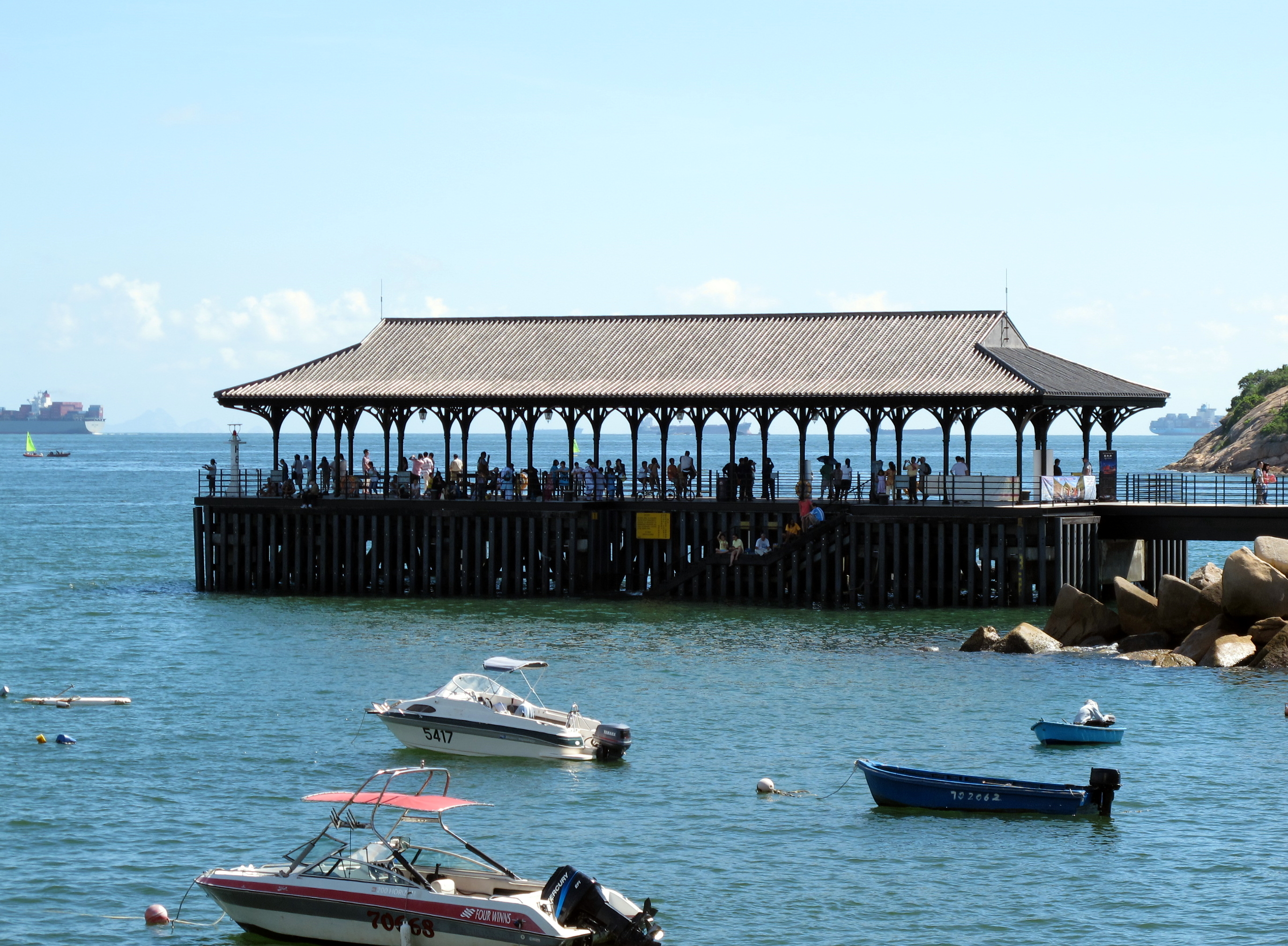
- Type: Pleasure Pier
- Location: Stanley, Hong Kong.

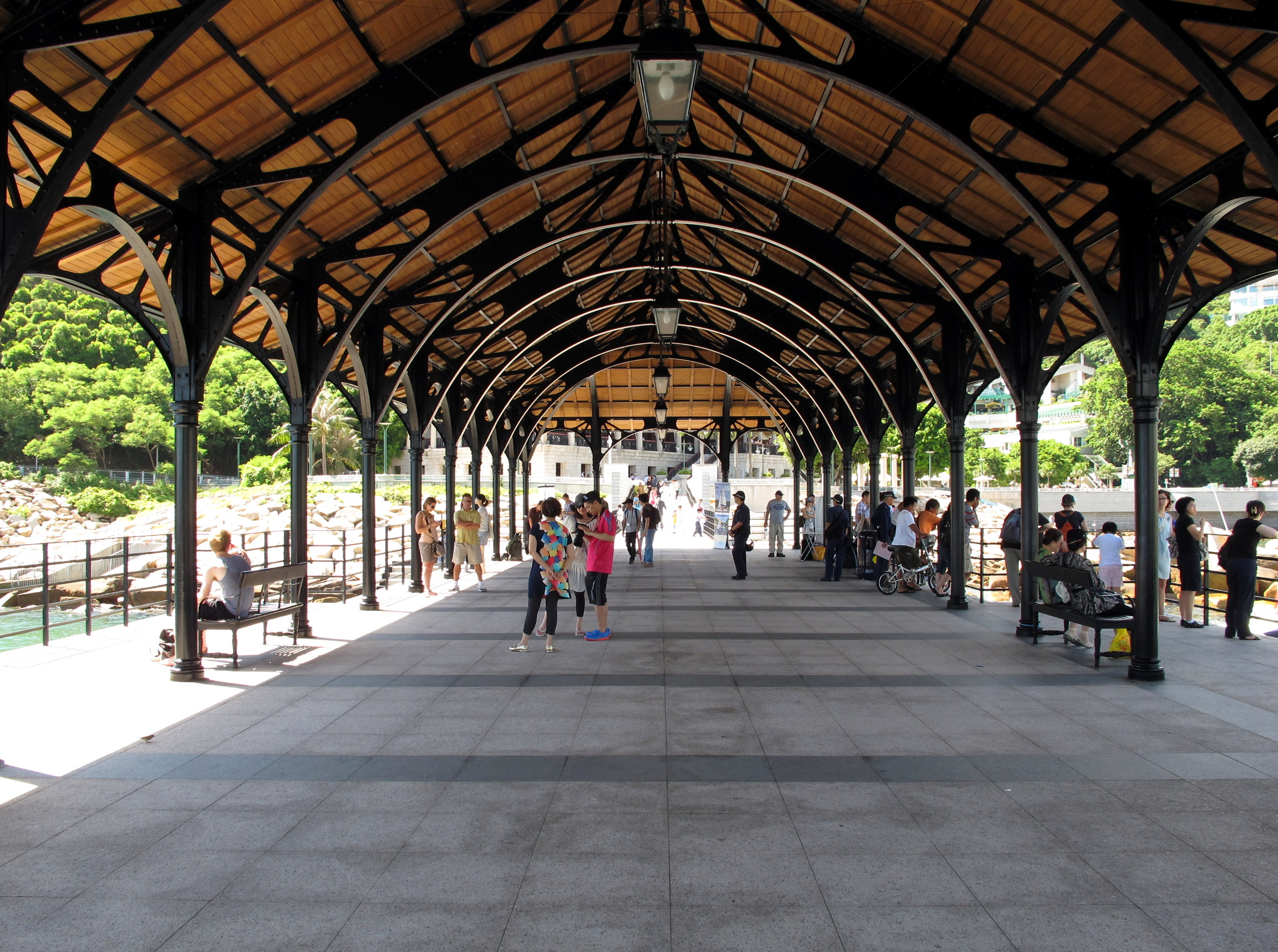
Blake Pier at Stanley

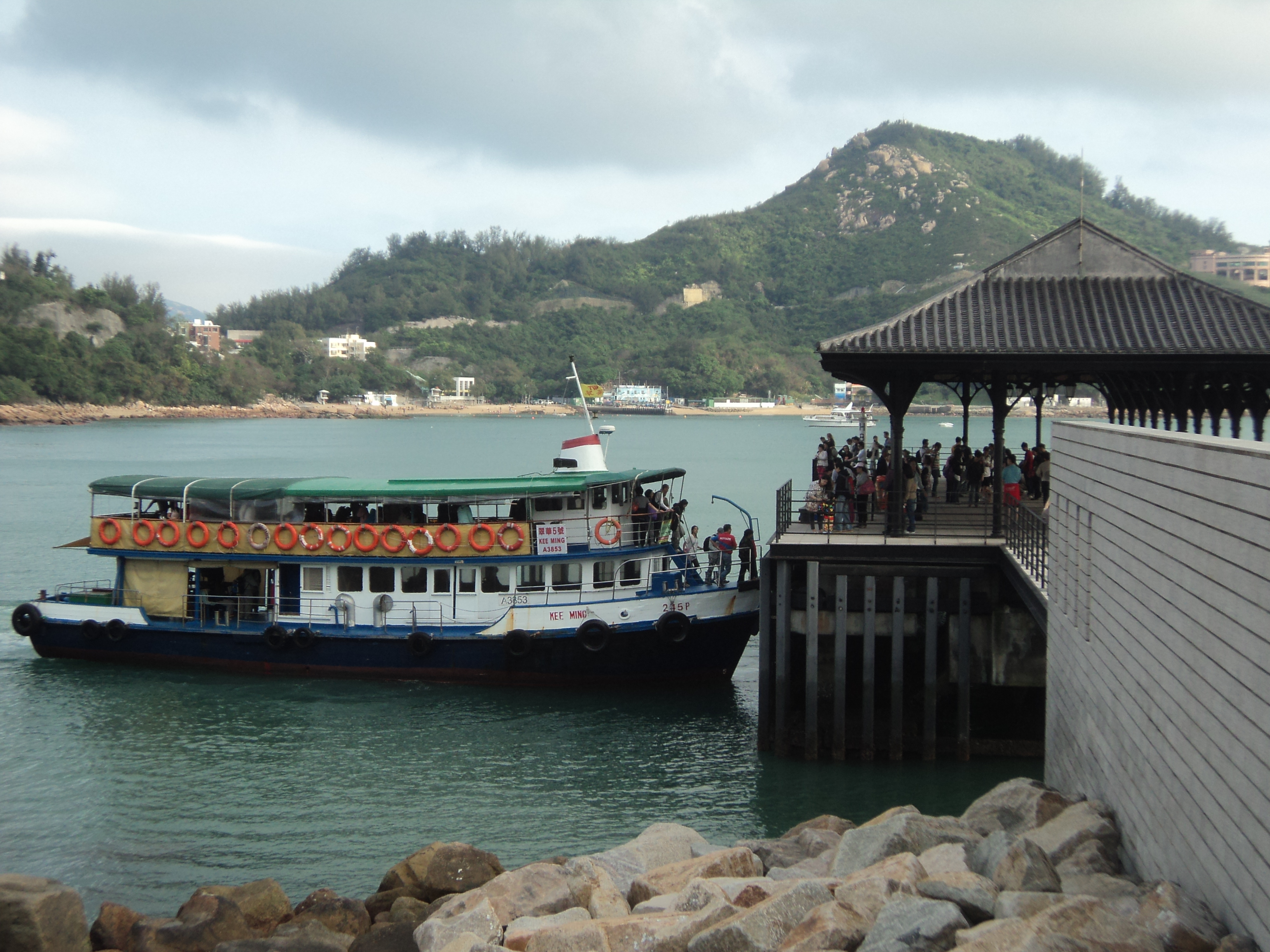
Tsui Wah Ferry docked at Blake Pier.

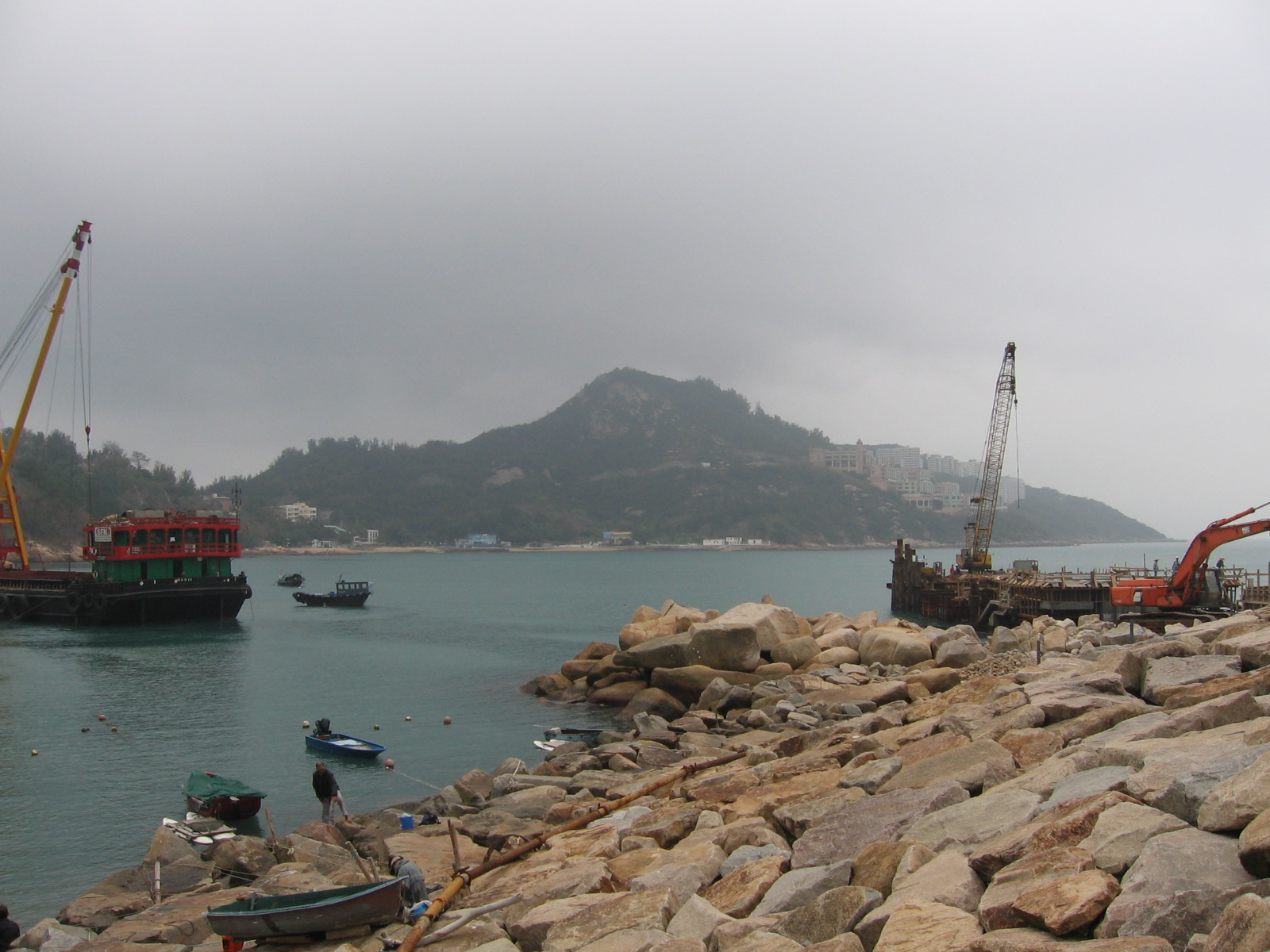
Blake Pier at Stanley under construction in 2006

Blake Pier at Stanley (Chinese: 赤柱卜公碼頭) is a public pier in Stanley, Hong Kong. The name originally referred to Blake Pier, Central, a ferry pier in Central, Hong Kong. The pier was named after Sir Henry Arthur Blake, the twelfth governor of Hong Kong. It was originally located at the site of the Central Reclamation Phase 1 project.

The top structure of the pier was later transferred to the open-air oval theatre in Morse Park, in between Wong Tai Sin and Lok Fu, Kowloon. In 2006, the structure was once again transferred next to the Murray House in Stanley, itself dismantled brick by brick and relocated from Central. The pier was recommissioned in Stanley on 31 July 2007.

3D Laser Scanning Technology in digital recording of structures was applied to capture the 3D images of the roof structure. The pier has one kai-to route travelling between Aberdeen and Po Toi Island, via the pier operated by Tsui Wah Ferry.

== See also ==
- Heritage conservation in Hong Kong
- Queen's Pier
