= Murray House =

Building in Stanley, Hong Kong

Coordinates: 22.2182°N 114.2097°E

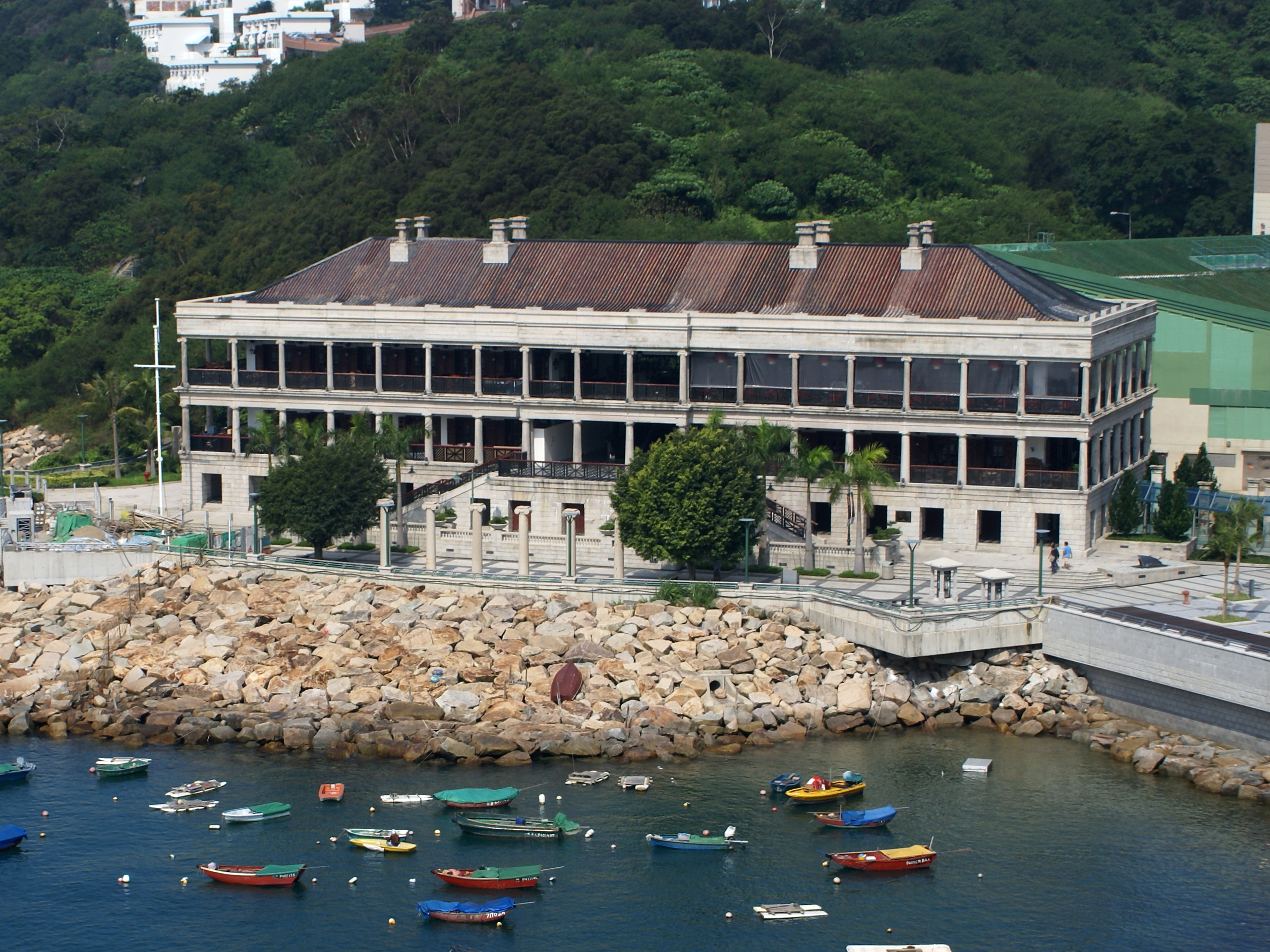
- Murray House is now situated in Stanley
- Traditional Chinese: 美利樓
- Simplified Chinese: 美利楼
Transcriptions
Standard Mandarin
- Hanyu Pinyin: Měilì Lóu
Yue: Cantonese
- IPA: [mēilèi lɐ̏u]

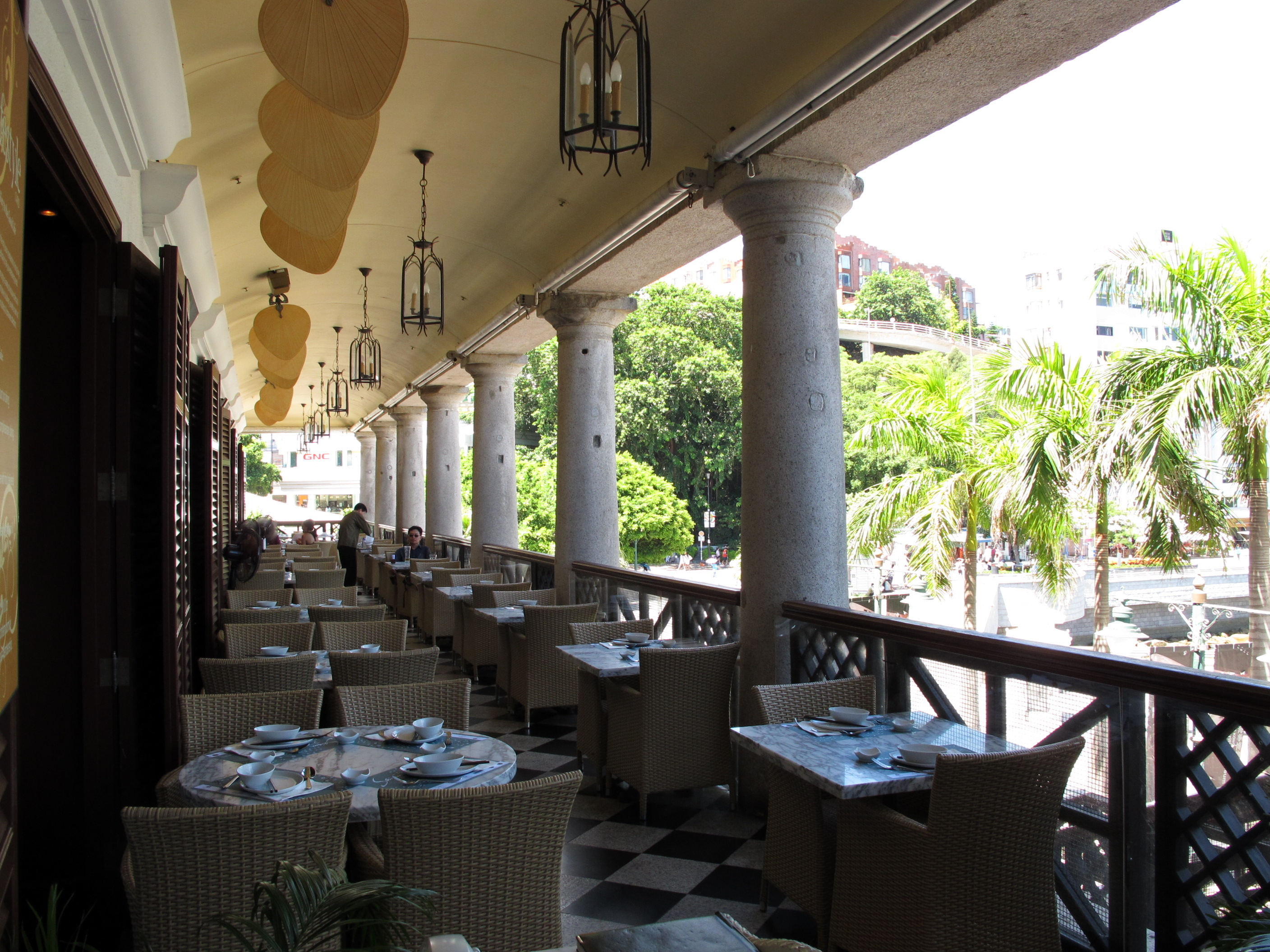
The architecture of Murray House

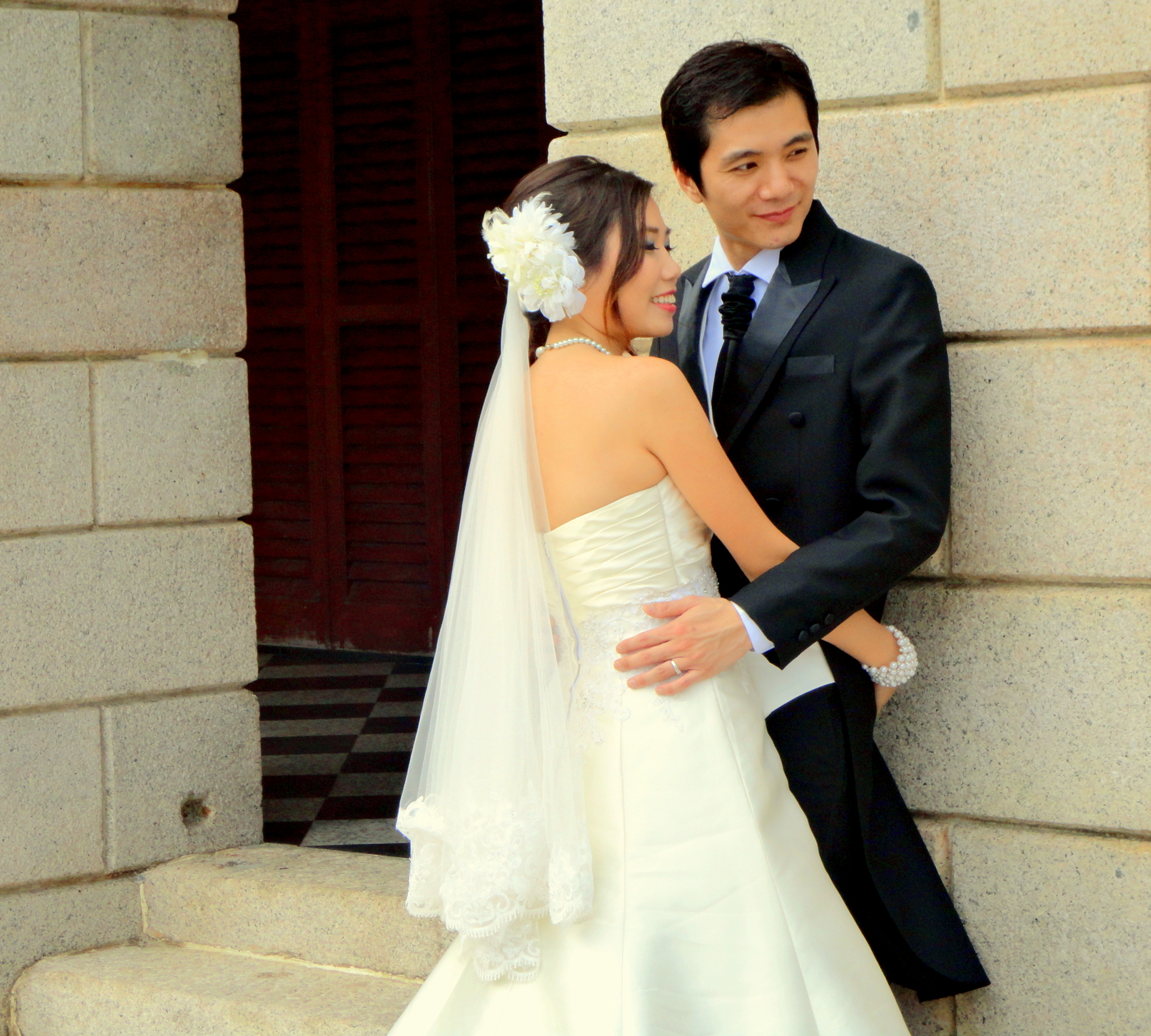
Murray House is a popular location for wedding photography

Murray House is a Victorian-era building in Stanley, Hong Kong. Built in the present-day business district of Central in 1846 as officers' quarters of the Murray Barracks, the building was moved to the south of Hong Kong Island during the 2000s. This building has become an iconic landmark in Hong Kong. After housing the Hong Kong Maritime Museum, now in Stanley, it is now home to restaurants and shops.

== Architecture ==
Murray House was one of the oldest surviving public buildings in Hong Kong. Similar to many of its contemporaries from the early colonial era, it was designed in Neoclassical style. The heavy stone walls (with flat arched opening) are on the ground floor to give a sense of stability, while the lighter Doric and Ionic columns are on the floors above to allow better ventilation. All floors have verandas on all sides in response to the local subtropical/monsoons climate.

== History ==
=== Early history ===
Murray House was built in 1846 as officers' quarters of the Murray Barracks during the early years of British rule. It was named after Sir George Murray, the British Master-General of the Ordnance at the time. The designer and constructor were Major Edward Aldrich and Lieutenant Thomas Bernard Collinson of the Royal Engineers.

=== Japanese occupation ===
During the 44-month Japanese occupation of Hong Kong, the building was used as the command centre by the Japanese military police. It was also the execution place for some Chinese citizens.

=== Post-war period ===
After World War II, several government departments used the building as offices, including the Rating and Valuation Department, starting in 1965. The building was believed to be haunted and was exorcised twice. One of the exorcism ceremonies was held in 1963, the other one was held in 1974 and was televised. Since it was a government building, the Government granted permission for the exorcism to be performed.

== Move to Stanley ==
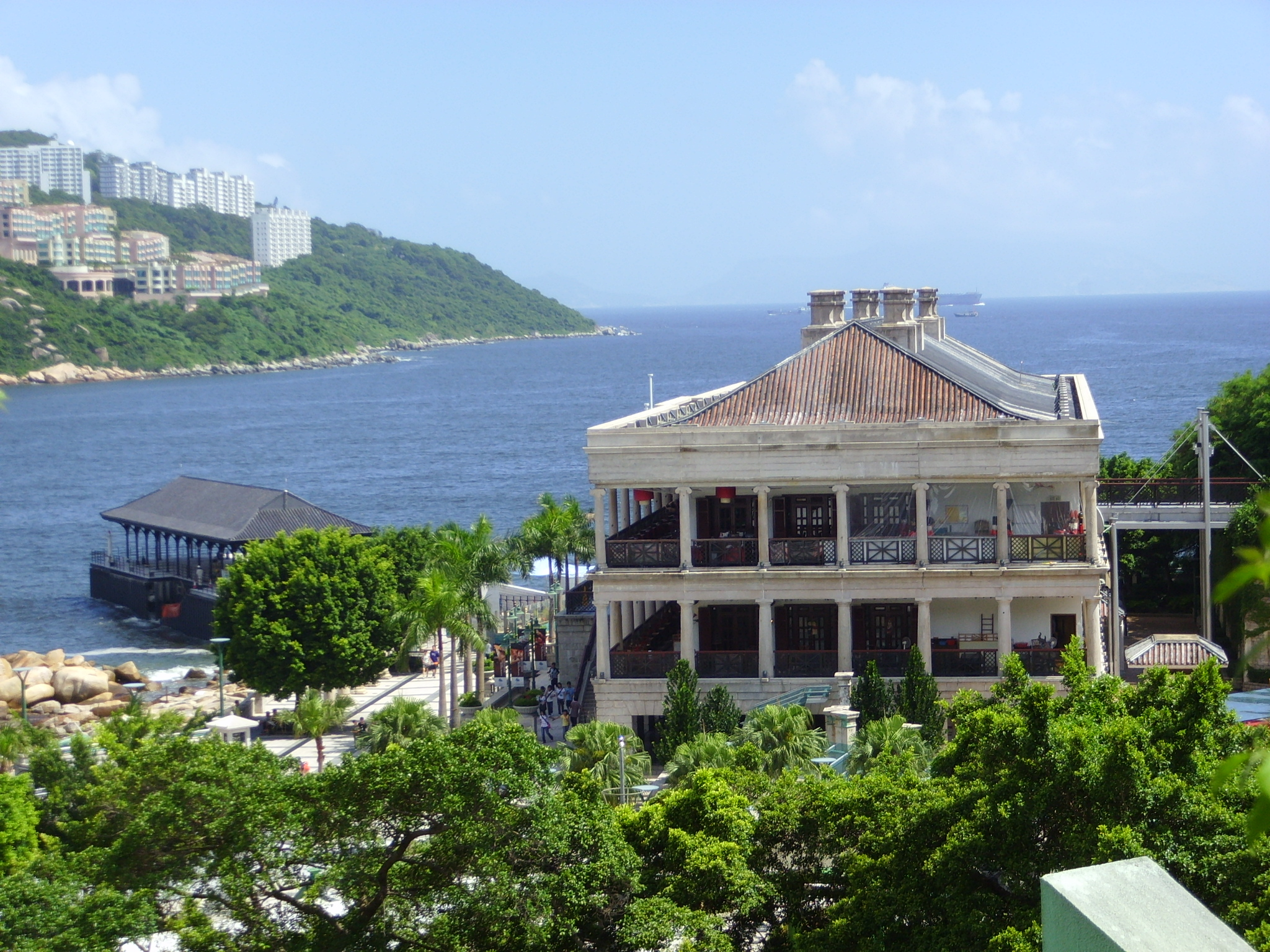
Murray House and Blake Pier in Stanley.

In 1982, the historical landmark was dismantled to yield to the new Bank of China Tower. Over 3,000 building blocks were labelled and catalogued for future restoration. In 1990, the Housing Department proposed the resurrection of the building in Stanley. The building was restored in 2001 and reopened in 2002.

Originally classified as a Grade I building, the rebuilt House was not graded, as it was considered that the relocation project had failed to meet the international standard for heritage preservation.

== Hong Kong Maritime Museum ==
The Hong Kong Maritime Museum was established on the ground floor of Murray House in 2005, then moved to Pier 8 in Central in February 2013.

== See also ==
- Blake Pier at Stanley
- Heritage conservation in Hong Kong
- List of buildings and structures in Hong Kong
